= Hits from Yesterday & the Day Before =

Greatest hits album by Barenaked Ladies
- Released: 27 September 2011
- Recorded: 1991–2009
- Genre: Alternative rock
- Length: 57:22
- Label: Rhino Records

Barenaked Ladies chronology
All in Good Time (2010)	Hits from Yesterday & the Day Before (2011)	Stop Us If You've Heard This One Before (2012)

Hits from Yesterday & the Day Before is a greatest hits compilation album by Barenaked Ladies that includes several US singles released 1997–2010. The album was released by Rhino Records on 27 September 2011.

== Album contents ==
Hits from Yesterday & the Day Before compiles singles released in the US in 1997–2010. One non-album single is included; "Big Bang Theory Theme". The album contains nine songs previously included on Disc One: All Their Greatest Hits (1991–2001), four songs from three of the band's albums released in the ten years since that release (Everything to Everyone, Barenaked Ladies Are Me, and All in Good Time), and the non-album "Big Bang Theory Theme". No tracks from holiday-themed Barenaked for the Holidays or the children's album Snacktime! are included.

== Reception ==
Professional ratings
Review scores
Source	Rating
Allmusic	3.5/5 stars
Popmatters	6/10 stars
Record Collector	2/5 stars

== Track listing ==
All tracks are written by Steven Page and Ed Robertson, except where noted.

No.	Title	Writer(s)	Lead Vocal(s)	Length
1.	"If I Had $1000000"		Steven Page; Ed Robertson	4:25
2.	"The Old Apartment"		Steven Page	3:22
3.	"Brian Wilson" (live)	Steven Page	Steven Page	4:45
4.	"One Week"	Ed Robertson	Steven Page; Ed Robertson	2:49
5.	"It's All Been Done"	Steven Page	Steven Page	3:26
6.	"Call and Answer"	Steven Page; Stephen Duffy	Steven Page	5:48
7.	"Pinch Me"		Ed Robertson	4:37
8.	"Too Little Too Late"		Steven Page	3:24
9.	"Falling for the First Time"		Ed Robertson	3:39
10.	"Another Postcard"		Steven Page; Ed Robertson	3:25
11.	"Testing 1,2,3"		Ed Robertson	3:32
12.	"Easy"		Ed Robertson	4:31
13.	"Big Bang Theory Theme"	Ed Robertson	Ed Robertson	1:45
14.	"You Run Away"	Ed Robertson	Ed Robertson	4:22
Total length:				54:24

iTunes Pre-Order
No.	Title	Lead Vocal(s)	Length
15.	"Great Provider" (1988 home demo)	Ed Robertson	3:38

== Deluxe editions ==
A limited fan edition of the album has been made available through the Canadian Rhino Records website. This version includes the CD, a signed lithograph signed, a digital version of the album, and a demo version of "Great Provider" recorded in 1988. 250 copies of this edition were made.

== Musicians ==
- Ed Robertson
- Jim Creeggan
- Tyler Stewart
- Steven Page (all but 14)
- Kevin Hearn (all except tracks 1 and 2)
- Andy Creeggan on "If I Had $1000000"

== Production ==
- Art Direction: Chris Billheimer
- Band Management: Jordan Feldstein, Rich Egan (CAM8)
- Mastering/Mixing: Charles Benson
- Project Assistance: Mike Engstrom, Linzi Schall, Erin Solis, Manson Williams, Steve Woolard
