= Juno Awards of 2001 =

Canadian music awards ceremony

- Date: 3–4 March 2001
- Venue: Copps Coliseum, Hamilton, Ontario
- Hosted by: Rick Mercer

Television/radio coverage
- Network: CBC

The Juno Awards of 2001 were held in Hamilton, Ontario Canada during the weekend of 3–4 March 2001.

The primary ceremonies were hosted by Rick Mercer at Copps Coliseum on 4 March 2001 and broadcast on CBC Television. Performers during the telecast included: Deborah Cox, Nelly Furtado, The Guess Who, Jacksoul, Michie Mee, The Moffatts and Treble Charger.

Nominations were announced 24 January 2001. Nelly Furtado received five nominations and won four of these.

The 2001 awards were the last Junos broadcast on CBC Television until 2018. From 2002 to 2017, the awards would move to CTV. Up to 2001, every primary Juno ceremony had been aired on the CBC since the first Juno telecast in 1975.

== Nominees and winners ==
=== Best Female Artist ===
Winner: Jann Arden

Other Nominees:

- Isabelle Boulay
- Terri Clark
- Lara Fabian
- Lynda Lemay

=== Best Male Artist ===
Winner: Neil Young

Other Nominees:

- Nicola Ciccone
- Jesse Cook
- Sylvain Cossette
- Snow

=== Best New Solo Artist ===
Winner: Nelly Furtado

Other Nominees:

- J. Englishman
- Adam Gregory
- Sarah Harmer
- Amanda Stott

=== Best Group ===
Winner: Barenaked Ladies

Other Nominees:

- Blue Rodeo
- The Moffatts
- soulDecision
- The Tragically Hip

=== Best New Group ===
Winner: Nickelback

Other Nominees:

- b4-4
- Kittie
- Sum 41
- Templar

=== Best Songwriter ===
Winner: Nelly Furtado, "Turn Off The Light", "I'm Like A Bird", "...On the Radio (Remember the Days)"

Other Nominees:

- Bryan Adams with Robert "Mutt" Lange, "The Best of Me"
- Darrin O'Brien and Robbie Patterson, "Everybody Wants To Be Like You" (co-writers Glenn Marais and Shawn Moltke), "Joke Thing" (co-writers Mark Jackson), "Nothin' On Me" (co-writers Michael Tucker and Dave Greenberg).
- Steven Page and Ed Robertson (Barenaked Ladies), "Pinch Me", "Too Little Too Late", "Falling For The First Time"
- Blaise Pascal, "Angel Baby" (co-writer Roy Salmond), "10 Feet High" (co-writer Rob Laidlaw), "Rush" (co-writer Stan Meissner)

=== Best Country Female Artist ===
Winner: Terri Clark

Other Nominees:

- Tara Lyn Hart
- Carolyn Dawn Johnson
- Shania Twain
- Michelle Wright

=== Best Country Male Artist ===
Winner: Paul Brandt

Other Nominees:

- Julian Austin
- Chris Cummings
- Adam Gregory
- Jason McCoy

=== Best Country Group or Duo ===
Winner: The Wilkinsons

Other Nominees:

- Farmer's Daughter
- The Johner Brothers
- Lace
- Prairie Oyster

=== Best Producer ===
Winner: Gerald Eaton, Brian West and Nelly Furtado, "I'm like a Bird" and "Turn off the Light" both by Nelly Furtado

Other Nominees:

- Chad Irschick, "One Turn Deserves Another" and "Turn of the Century" both by Susan Aglukark
- Arnold Lanni, "Drag You Down" and "First Time" both by Finger Eleven
- Jason Levine and James Bryan McCollum, "Get Down" by b4-4 and "www.nevergetoveryou" by Prozzäk
- Bob Rock, "Spy" and "Just Another Phase" by The Moffatts

=== Best Recording Engineer ===
Winner: Jeff Wolpert, "Make It Go Away" and "Romantically Helpless" both by Holly Cole

Other Nominees:

- Chad Irschick, "One Turn Deserves Another" and "Stand Up" both by Susan Aglukark
- Adam Messinger, "I Wish" and "Drive My Car", both by Cadence
- Randy Staub, "Just Another Phase" and "Antifreeze & Aeroplanes" both by The Moffatts
- Brian West and Brad Haehnel, "I'm like a Bird" and "Turn off the Light" both by Nelly Furtado

=== Canadian Music Hall of Fame ===
Winner: Bruce Cockburn

=== Walt Grealis Special Achievement Award ===
Winner: Daniel Caudeiron

== Nominated and winning albums ==
=== Best Album ===
Winner: Maroon, Barenaked Ladies

Other Nominees:

- Beautiful Midnight, Matthew Good Band
- Music @ Work, The Tragically Hip
- No One Does It Better, soulDecision
- Happiness...Is Not A Fish That You Can Catch, Our Lady Peace

=== Best Blues Album ===
Winner: Love Comin' Down, Sue Foley

Other Nominees:

- Conversation with the Blues, Michael Pickett
- Neck Bones & Caviar, Mel Brown (guitarist)
- Rough Luck, Ray Bonneville
- Topless, Big Daddy G

=== Best Children's Album ===
Winner: Sing & Dance, Jack Grunsky

Other Nominees:

- Annie, Annie Brocoli
- Charlotte Diamond's World, Charlotte Diamond
- Cradle on the Waves, Teresa Doyle
- Step To It, Norman Foote

=== Best Classical Album (Solo or Chamber Ensemble) ===
Winner: Bach: The Six Sonatas & Partitas for Solo Violin, James Ehnes

Other Nominees:

- Bach: Goldberg Variations, Angela Hewitt
- Beethoven: 32 Piano Sonatas, Robert Silverman
- R. Murray Schafer: String Quartets 1-7, Quatuor Molinari
- Infernal Violins, Angèle Dubeau and La Pieta

=== Best Classical Album (Large Ensemble or Soloist(s) with Large Ensemble Accompaniment) ===
Winner: Sibelius: Lemminkainen Suite, Night Ride and Sunrise, Toronto Symphony Orchestra, conductor Jukka-Pekka Saraste

Other Nominees:

- Chausson: Poeme, Chantal Juillet, Montreal Symphony Orchestra, conductor Charles Dutoit
- Henry Dutilleux: Orchestral Works, Toronto Symphony Orchestra, conductor Jukka-Pekka Saraste
- Liszt: Piano Concerti, Janina Fialkowska, Calgary Philharmonic Orchestra
- Mendelssohn, Glazunov: Violin Concertos, Leila Josefowicz, Montreal Symphony Orchestra, conductor Charles Dutoit
- Telemann: Orchestral Suites, Tafelmusik Baroque Orchestra

=== Best Classical Album (Vocal or Choral Performance) ===
Winner: G.F. Handel: Apollo e Dafne Silete Venti, Karina Gauvin, Russell Braun, Les Violons du Roy

Other Nominees:

- Bach: Motets, Tafelmusik Chamber Choir
- Berlioz: l'Enfance du Christ, Choeur et Orchestre Symphonique de Montreal, conductor Charles Dutoit
- Coffee Cantata & Peasant Cantato, Tafelmusik, Suzie LeBlanc, Brett Polegato, Nils Brown
- Millennium Opera Gala, Richard Margison, Michael Schade, Catherine Robbin, Tracy Dahl, Frances Ginzer, Jean Stilwell, Toronto Symphony Orchestra

=== Best Album Design ===
Winner: Stuart Chatwood, James St. Laurent, Margaret Malandruccolo, Antoine Moonen, Nik Sarros, Tangents: The Tea Party Collection by The Tea Party Other Nominees:

- Bendit Aquin, Yann Gamblin, Sebastien Toupin, Du Coq à l'âme by Lynda Lemay
- Tchi, Sebastien Toupin, Anne Vivien, Projet Orange by Projet Orange
- Michael Wrycraft, Six Strings North of the Border, Volume 1 by various artists
- Martin Tielli, Michael Wrycraft, The Story of Harmelodia by Rheostatics

=== Best Gospel Album ===
Winner: Simple Songs, Steve Bell

Other Nominees:

- Jake, Jake
- Mark Masri, Mark Masri
- Mon Seul Espoir, La Chorale du Conservatoire de Musique Moderne
- Naked Soul, Kelita Haverland

=== Best Instrumental Album ===
Winner: Free Fall, Jesse Cook

Other Nominees:

- Celtic Devotion, Oliver Schroer
- Fantasia, Pavlo
- Natural Massage Therapy, Dan Gibson, Ron Allen, Dr. Lee Bartel
- Natural Relaxation, Dan Gibson, Ron Allen, Dr. Lee Bartel

=== Best Selling Album (Foreign or Domestic) ===
Winner: The Marshall Mathers LP, Eminem

Other Nominees:

- Enrique, Enrique Iglesias
- Human Clay, Creed
- No Strings Attached, 'N Sync
- Oops!… I Did It Again, Britney Spears

=== Best Traditional Jazz Album - Instrumental ===
Winner: Rob McConnell Tentet, Rob McConnell Tentet

Other Nominees:

- Brad Turner Quartet, Brad Turner
- Higher Grounds, Ingrid Jensen
- New Beginnings, Kirk MacDonald
- Way Out East, Alive and Well

=== Best Contemporary Jazz Album - Instrumental ===
Winner: Compassion, François Carrier Trio + 1

Other Nominees:

- Creaton Dream, Michael Occhipinti
- Metalwood 3, Metalwood
- No Strings Attached, Michael Kaeshammer
- Step and a Half, Knut Haaugsoen

=== Best Vocal Jazz Album ===
Winner: Both Sides Now, Joni Mitchell

Other Nominees:

- Dark Divas, Ranee Lee
- I Found Love, Denzal Sinclaire
- Molly Johnson, Molly Johnson
- This Is How Men Cry, Marc Jordan

=== Best Roots or Traditional Album - Group ===
Winner: Tri-Continental, Tri-Continental (Bill Bourne, Lester Quitzau, Madagascar Slim)

Other Nominees:

- Postcards, Tom Landa and the Paperboys
- Racket in the Attic, Barra MacNeils
- Tractor Parts: Further Adventures in Strang, Zubot and Dawson
- VDC, La Volée d'Castors

=== Best Roots or Traditional Album - Solo ===
Winner: Jenny Whiteley, Jenny Whiteley

Other Nominees:

- Don Messer's Violin, Frank Leahy and Friends
- Hush, Jane Siberry
- Love Is A Truck, Connie Kaldor
- Silver & Gold, Neil Young

=== Best Alternative Album ===
Winner: Mass Romantic, The New Pornographers

Other Nominees:

- Carpal Tunnel Syndrome, Kid Koala
- The East Infection, Ramasutra
- Left and Leaving, The Weakerthans
- Mayday, King Cobb Steelie

=== Best Selling Francophone Album ===
Winner: Un Grand Noël d'amour, Ginette Reno

Other Nominees:

- Mieux qu'ici bas, Isabelle Boulay
- L'opéra du Mendiant, Nicola Ciccone
- Scènes d'Amour, Isabelle Boulay
- Seul, Garou

=== Best Pop Album ===
Winner: Maroon, Barenaked Ladies

Other Nominees:

- Mind on the Moon, Snow
- Submodalities, The Moffatts
- Whoa, Nelly!, Nelly Furtado
- You Were Here, Sarah Harmer

=== Best Rock Album ===
Winner: Music @ Work, The Tragically Hip

Other Nominees:

- Casual Viewin', 54-40
- The Greyest of Blue Skies, Finger Eleven
- Stew, Wide Mouth Mason
- Wide Awake Bored, Treble Charger

== Nominated and winning releases ==
=== Best Single ===
Winner: "I'm like a Bird", Nelly Furtado

Other Nominees:

- "American Psycho", Treble Charger
- "Can't Stop", Jacksoul
- "Faded", soulDecision
- "Pinch Me", Barenaked Ladies

=== Best Classical Composition ===
Winner: From the Diary of Anne Frank, Oskar Morawetz

Other Nominees:

- Affairs of the Heart, Marjan Mozetich
- La Cévenole, Paul M. Douglas
- Once on a Windy Night, R. Murray Schafer
- The Third Piano Concerto, Harry Somers

=== Best Rap Recording ===
Winner: Balance, Swollen Members

Other Nominees:

- Dim Sum, DJ Serious
- Husslin', Kardinal Offishall
- "Live Ordeal", BrassMunk
- "Money Jane", Baby Blue Soundcrew (featuring Kardinal Offishall, Sean Paul, Jully Black)

=== Best R&B/Soul Recording ===
Winner: Sleepless, jacksoul

Other Nominees:

- A Nu Day, Tamia
- "I Will Be Waiting", D-Cru
- "If I Ever Lose This Heaven", The Philosopher Kings
- "Only Be In Love", Baby Blue Soundcrew featuring Glenn Lewis

=== Best Music of Aboriginal Canada Recording ===
Winner: Nipaiamianan, Florent Vollant

Other Nominees:

- Figure Love Out, John Gracie
- Journey Home, Mishi Donovan
- Run As One, C-Weed
- Unsung Heroes, Susan Aglukark

=== Best Reggae Recording ===
Winner: Lenn Hammond, Lenn Hammond

Other Nominees:

- Dem Need More Love, Tasha T
- Jonah, Jason Wilson and Tabarruk
- Love Is On Your Side, Lazo
- Secret Emotion, Jimmy Reid

=== Best Global Album ===
Winner: Ritmo + Soul, Jane Bunnett and the Spirits of Havana

Other Nominees:

- Dancing on Water, Finjan
- Esprit, Quartango
- Free Fall, Jesse Cook
- Morumba Cubana, Puentes Brothers

=== Best Dance Recording ===
Winner: Into the Night, Love Inc.

Other Nominees:

- Airtight, Max Graham
- If You Don't Know, Temperance
- Look at Us, Sarina Paris
- What You Do, Big Bass featuring Michelle Narine

=== Best Video ===
Winner: Rob Heydon, "Alive" by Edwin

Other Nominees:

- Micha Dahan, "Drag You Down" by Finger Eleven
- William Morrison, "The Future is X-Rated" by Matthew Good Band
- William Morrison, "Load Me Up" by Matthew Good Band
- Micha Dahan, "Thief" by Our Lady Peace
