= All in Good Time (Barenaked Ladies album) =

Studio album by Barenaked Ladies
- Released: 23 March 2010
- Recorded: 19 May–24 July 2009
- Genre: Alternative rock
- Length: 50:09
- Label: Raisin' Records
- Producer: Michael Phillip Wojewoda

Barenaked Ladies chronology
Snacktime! (2008)	All in Good Time (2010)	Hits from Yesterday & the Day Before (2011)

Singles from All in Good Time
- 1. "You Run Away" Released: 11 January 2010; 2. "Every Subway Car (with Erin McCarley)" Released: 23 February 2010

All In Good Time is the ninth studio album by Barenaked Ladies, released by Raisin' Records 23 March 2010 in Canada, and 30 March 2010 in the United States. It is the first album recorded following the departure of founding member Steven Page in February 2009, and the band's second album recorded as a four-piece (their 1996 album Born on a Pirate Ship was recorded between the departure of original keyboardist Andy Creeggan and the arrival of his replacement Kevin Hearn).

"You Run Away" was released as a single on 10 January 2010. "Every Subway Car" was released on US and Canadian iTunes on 23 February. It was later released as the second single from the album, recut as a duet with Erin McCarley.

The band had composed 27 songs, with 18 ultimately being recorded. With Page's departure, Hearn and bassist Jim Creeggan filled the void by contributing a comparatively greater share of lead vocals than on previous albums. Ed Robertson, who contributed lead vocals equally with Page, sings lead on 10 of the 18 recorded songs, while Hearn and Creeggan sing on five and three, respectively. Drummer Tyler Stewart also lent significant vocals to "Four Seconds".

== Production history ==
After founding member Steven Page announced his departure in February 2009, the band indicated that the remaining members would continue recording and touring together as Barenaked Ladies.

The band began recording the new album with producer Michael Phillip Wojewoda on 19 May 2009, and documented their rehearsal and recording process through their Twitter account. Primary recording was done at Canterbury Studios in Toronto, with additional recording done at Jim Creeggan's home. Recording ended on 24 July, and Bob Clearmountain finished mixing the 18 recorded tracks on 30 July. The final album consisting of 13 songs (later changed to 14) was sequenced and mastered on 13 August. In August, Robertson indicated the possibility of releasing an EP composed of the songs that did not make the cut for the final album.

The band announced on 6 January 2010 that it had signed an exclusive worldwide distribution agreement with EMI Label Services through its new label Raisin' Records, which replaces its previous label, Desperation Records, used from its break with Reprise Records in 2004 until the departure of Page in 2009.

== Reception ==
Professional ratings
Review scores
Source	Rating
Allmusic	3/5 stars
Billboard	3/5 stars
Consequence of Sound	2.5/5 stars
Entertainment Weekly	B
The Globe and Mail	favorable
Toronto Star	favorable

The album has received mostly positive reviews.

== Release ==
The standard album contains fourteen tracks. This version is available in physical CD format, digital download, as well as a vinyl version made available through the band's webstore on 14 April 2010. The vinyl version, however, does not include the songs "I Have Learned" and "How Long". This was done to fit the album on one vinyl record rather than releasing as a double-LP.

Four songs were recorded but not included on the standard album: "All In Good Time", "Moonstone", "She Turned Away", and "Let There Be Light". Three of these tracks are retailer-exclusive bonus tracks, while the latter was an exclusive bonus for purchasers of concert tickets on the tours following the album's release. The band's management indicated that these tracks would ultimately be available for separate purchase after a period of time. However, as of 2017, they have not been released.

A limited edition physical version of the album is available in Canada, and is exclusively available in the United States through f.y.e. music stores (though Amazon.com offers it as an import from Canada) This edition includes a T-shirt of the cover photo and a bonus disc containing live acoustic versions of two of the album's songs from a radio performance.

== Track listing ==
All tracks are written by Ed Robertson, except where noted.

No.	Title	Writer(s)	Lead Vocal(s)	Length
1.	"You Run Away"		Ed Robertson	4:22
2.	"Summertime"	Robertson; Ian LeFeuvre	Ed Robertson	3:51
3.	"Another Heartbreak"	Kevin Hearn	Kevin Hearn	3:23
4.	"Four Seconds"	Robertson; LeFeuvre	Ed Robertson; Tyler Stewart	2:44
5.	"On the Lookout"	Jim Creeggan	Jim Creeggan	3:31
6.	"Ordinary"		Ed Robertson	4:09
7.	"I Have Learned"		Ed Robertson	3:06
8.	"Every Subway Car"		Ed Robertson	3:49
9.	"Jerome"	Hearn	Kevin Hearn	3:22
10.	"How Long"		Ed Robertson	3:39
11.	"Golden Boy"		Ed Robertson	3:13
12.	"I Saw It"	Creeggan	Jim Creeggan	3:50
13.	"The Love We're In"		Ed Robertson	2:42
14.	"Watching the Northern Lights"	Hearn	Kevin Hearn	4:27
Total length:				50:08

f.y.e. Edition
No.	Title	Writer(s)	Lead Vocal(s)	Length
15.	"Another Heartbreak" (Acoustic)	Hearn	Kevin Hearn	3:18
16.	"Four Seconds" (Acoustic)		Ed Robertson	2:58

Bonus Tracks
No.	Title	Writer(s)	Lead Vocal(s)	Length
15.	"Moonstone"	Robertson	Ed Robertson	3:04
16.	"All in Good Time"	Hearn	Kevin Hearn	3:09
17.	"Let There Be Light"	Hearn	Kevin Hearn	3:03
18.	"She Turned Away"	Creeggan	Jim Creeggan	4:03

== Personnel ==
- Ed Robertson – lead vocals, acoustic and electric guitars, electric bass, drums, percussion, synthesizer, background vocals
- Kevin Hearn – lead vocal on 3, 9, and 14, piano, synthesizers, keyboards, celeste, acoustic and electric guitars, mandolin, banjo, accordion, harmonica, background vocals
- Jim Creeggan – lead vocal on 5 and 12, double bass, electric bass, electric guitar, cello, piano, string arrangements, background vocals
- Tyler Stewart – drums, percussion, background vocals

=== Additional musicians ===
- Michael Phillip Wojewoda – additional vocals and percussion
- Ian LeFeuvre – guitar on 4
- Jeff Nelsen – horn on 9
- Erin McCarley – vocals
- String quartet on 5, 12
  - Aya Miyagawa – 1st violin
  - Gregory Campbell – 2nd violin
  - Capella Sherwood – viola
  - Amy Laing – cello

=== Production ===
- Production/Engineering: Michael Phillip Wojewoda
- Engineering/Digital editing: Kenny Luong
- Additional Engineering: Jeremy Darby
- Mixing: Bob Clearmountain
- Mix Assistance: Brandon Duncan
- Mastering: Ted Jensen
- Art Direction/Design: Chris Bellheimer
- Photography: James Minchin III
- Clock Photograph: Kevin Hearn

== Singles ==
Two singles were released from All in Good Time. "You Run Away", the lead single, achieved moderate success, becoming the band's highest-charting song in Canada since 2000's "Pinch Me". "Every Subway Car" was released as a single, but did not chart.

Single information
"You Run Away"
- Released: 2010
- Formats: CD, Digital Download
- Canadian Hot 100: No. 25
- U.S. Billboard Adult Pop Songs: No. 21
"Every Subway Car"
- Released: 2010
- Formats: CD, Digital Download

== Charts ==
All In Good Time has been relatively successful on the charts, being the band's highest charting since their 2003 album Everything to Everyone

Chart (2010)	Peak position
Canadian Albums (Billboard)	3
US Billboard 200	23
US Digital Albums (Billboard)	4
US Independent Albums (Billboard)	1
US Top Rock Albums (Billboard)	2
