= Stop Us If You've Heard This One Before =

Compilation album by Barenaked Ladies
- Released: 8 May 2012
- Recorded: 1992–2003
- Genre: Alternative rock
- Length: 43:06
- Label: Rhino Records

Barenaked Ladies chronology
| Hits from Yesterday & the Day Before (2011) | Stop Us If You've Heard This One Before (2012) | Grinning Streak (2013) |

Professional ratings
Review scores
| Source | Rating |
|---|---|
| AllMusic | 3/5 stars |

Stop Us If You've Heard This One Before is a compilation album by Barenaked Ladies which includes rare recordings dating between 1992 and 2003. The album was originally planned as a companion to Hits from Yesterday & the Day Before; however, the release was pushed back to 8 May 2012, making it a standalone release. The 12-track album, released by Rhino Records, contains ten never-before-released tracks, as well as two previously released rarities.

== Album contents ==
Stop Us If You've Heard This One Before contains 12 songs spanning 1992 to 2003. It contains four final studio recordings (B-sides not included on albums), three live recordings, three demos, an "outtake" and a remix.

Two tracks ("One Week" (Pull's Break Remix) and "Yes! Yes!! Yes!!!") were previously released as B-sides on singles. "I Don't Get It Anymore" is the only final studio recording included for which the song was not later re-recorded and released on an album. "Second Best" appears on Everything to Everyone, and "Adrift", "Half A Heart" and "I Can, I Will, I Do" were subsequently re-recorded for Barenaked Ladies Are Me/Men.

Much of the material on Stop Us If You've Heard This One Before dates to the band's Reprise period. Four tracks come from 2003's Everything to Everyone, two more come from the sessions for 2001's Disc One: All Their Greatest Hits (1991-2001).

== Track listing ==
All tracks are written by Steven Page and Ed Robertson, except where noted.

| No. | Title | Writer(s) | Lead Vocal(s) | Length |
|---|---|---|---|---|
| 1. | "I Don't Get It Anymore" | | Ed Robertson | 5:05 |
| 2. | "Yes! Yes!! Yes!!!" (Stereo Mix) | Steven Page; Ed Robertson; Kevin Hearn | Steven Page | 2:45 |
| 3. | "Half a Heart" | | Ed Robertson | 4:51 |
| 4. | "The Old Apartment" (Demo; recorded 1995) | | Steven Page | 1:48 |
| 5. | "Shake Your Rump" (live, Santa Maria Hilton, 13 October 1994) | Adam Horowitz; Adam Yauch; Michael Diamond; Matt Dike; Mike Simpson | Steven Page; Ed Robertson; Andy Creeggan; Tyler Stewart | 2:54 |
| 6. | "Same Thing" (live, Canada 1992) | Ed Robertson | Ed Robertson | 4:11 |
| 7. | "One Week" (Pull's Break Remix) | Ed Robertson | Steven Page; Ed Robertson | 3:24 |
| 8. | "Teenage Wasteland" (live at Massey Hall, 3 April 1993) | | Ed Robertson | 4:08 |
| 9. | "Long While" (demo) | Steven Page; Ed Robertson; Jim Creeggan | Steven Page | 3:50 |
| 10. | "Second Best" (demo) | Steven Page; Ed Robertson; Kevin Hearn | Steven Page | 3:41 |
| 11. | "I Can, I Will, I Do" | | Steven Page | 3:09 |
| 12. | "Adrift" | Steven Page; Ed Robertson; Kevin Hearn | Ed Robertson; Kevin Hearn | 3:30 |
| Total length: | | | | 43:06 |

- Track 7 – originally released on 12" vinyl, along with three other mixes of the song, alternate versions of Tracks 2, 3, 10, 11, and 12 are previously released
- Track 2 – originally released as a B-side on the UK single of "Celebrity".
- Tracks 1, 11 – recorded during Disc One: All Their Greatest Hits (1991–2001) sessions in 2001.
- Tracks 2, 9, 10, 12 – recorded during the Everything to Everyone sessions from 2002 to 2003.
- Track 3 – recorded during Maroon sessions in 2000.

== Personnel ==
=== Barenaked Ladies ===
- Steven Page – vocals, guitar
- Ed Robertson – vocals, guitar
- Jim Creeggan – bass, vocals
- Tyler Stewart – drums, percussion, vocals
- Kevin Hearn – keyboards, piano, vocals
- Andy Creeggan – keyboards, piano, vocals (Tracks 5, 6 and 8)

== Production ==
- Art Direction: Chris Billheimer
- Band Management: Jordan Feldstein, Rich Egan (CAM8)
- Mastering/Mixing: Brad Blackwood
- Project Assistance: Mike Engstrom, Linzi Schall, Erin Solis, Manson Williams, Steve Woolard
