= Barenaked on a Stick =

Compilation album by Barenaked Ladies
- Released: 2005
- Recorded: May 2004
- Genre: Alternative rock
- Label: Desperation
- Producer: Barenaked Ladies

Professional ratings
Review scores
Source	Rating
Allmusic	link
Rolling Stone	(favourable) link

Barenaked on a Stick is Canadian alternative rock band Barenaked Ladies' first release in USB flash drive format. They were one of the first bands to attempt this, and were noted by several critics as innovative in this area. Due to the content on the stick, it is conjectured that this release was more of a test to see if the format would succeed. This paved the way for the band's second USB release of their 2006 album, Barenaked Ladies Are Me.

The 128 MB USB was sold initially at the band's 2005 holiday concert tour, and then through Nettwerk's online store, and though Amazon.com. The stick is packaged in a carded bubble package (similar to how an action figure is packaged), and is silver with the text "Barenaked on a stick" written along the side.

== Contents ==
The USB stick contained a variety of contents, all the audio of which had previously been released by the band. The 128 MB size forced low quality bitrates. Both factors strengthened the belief that the release was mainly of a test of the medium.

- The entire Barenaked for the Holidays in 128 kbit/s CBR MP3 (with PDF format liner notes)
- Seven "live favourites" in 112 kbit/s CBR MP3, directly taken from the live concerts as sold online (retaining the original track numbers, and long pauses at the end of encore tracks)
  - "For You" and "When I Fall" from the July 26, 2004 Au Naturale concert in Ridgefield, WA
  - "Brian Wilson", "If I Had $1000000", "The Old Apartment", "One Week/I Had a Little Dreidel" and "Pinch Me" from the December 20, 2004 Barenaked for the Holidays concert in Toronto, ON
- Four live ad libs in VBR MP3 averaging appx. 128 kbit/s, from the Everywhere For Everyone tour (titled, and without ID3 tags).
  - "Canadian Hosers" from Boston, MA: March 2, 2004
  - "Diarrhea Of A Madman" from Rochester, NY: March 3, 2004 (misspelled "Diahria")
  - "I'd Walk A Mile For A Camel" from Tempe, AZ: March 17, 2004
  - "Cheryl Tiegs" from Las Vegas, NV: March 19, 2004
- The original demo version of "Aluminum" in VBR MP3 averaging appx. 112 kbit/s
- Four QuickTime video files from the recording of the Holidays album
  - A take of the song "Hanukkah, Oh Hanukkah" 0:57
  - A compilation of some discussion, and several takes of the unreleased "We wish You A Merry Christmas" 1:18
  - A take of Tyler singing the unreleased "Holly Jolly Christmas" 0:41
  - Ed discussing the catering while Kevin plays a take of "O Holy Night" 0:27
- Nine promotional photos in medium resolution JPEG format, ranging from Stunt to the Holidays record.
- Six animated GIF AIM buddy icons (one for each member and one group one)

The album was originally released in 2004, the live songs and ad libs were released for sale on the band's website, and the "Aluminum" demo was released as a bonus download for those who bought the Holidays album from Amazon.com.
