= Everything Acoustic =

EP by Barenaked Ladies
- Released: September 30, 2003
- Recorded: 2003
- Genre: Alternative rock
- Length: 19:55
- Label: Reprise
- Producer: Ron Aniello

Barenaked Ladies chronology
Disc One: All Their Greatest Hits (1991–2001) (2001)	Everything Acoustic (2003)	Everything to Everyone (2003)

Everything Acoustic is an EP released by Barenaked Ladies on September 30, 2003. Released a month before Everything to Everyone, the EP contains live versions of six songs from that album. The tracks were recorded live in front of a small audience during the recording sessions for the album. Three of the songs from this EP were included as bonus tracks on the limited edition release of Everything to Everyone. The deluxe edition of the album includes a DVD with video and audio versions of 11 songs from the performance, including the songs on this EP.

== Track listing ==
All tracks are written by Steven Page and Ed Robertson, except where noted.

No.	Title	Writer(s)	Lead vocal(s)	Length
1.	"Maybe Katie"	Steven Page; Ed Robertson; Jim Creeggan	Page, Robertson	2:46
2.	"Another Postcard"		Page, Robertson	3:21
3.	"Next Time"	Steven Page; Ed Robertson; Jim Creeggan; Kevin Hearn	Page	3:59
4.	"Second Best"	Steven Page; Ed Robertson; Kevin Hearn	Page	3:19
5.	"Testing 1,2,3"		Robertson	3:00
6.	"Aluminum"		Robertson	4:10
Total length:				19:55
