= Cloud Maintenance =

Studio album by Kevin Hearn
- Released: December 20, 2011
- Length: 34:17
- Label: Celery Music
- Producers: Kevin Hearn, Michael Phillip Wojewoda

Kevin Hearn chronology
Havana Winter (2009)	Cloud Maintenance (2011)	Days in Frames (2014)

Cloud Maintenance is an album by Kevin Hearn. It is his second solo album, after 1997's Mothball Mint, and his sixth solo release including his Thin Buckle releases. The album was released December 20, 2011.

== Track listing ==
No.	Title	Writer(s)	Length
1.	"Northland Train"	Kevin Hearn	3:29
2.	"She Waved"	Hearn	4:08
3.	"Don't Shuffle Me Back"	Hearn	2:54
4.	"Grey Garden"	Hearn	3:07
5.	"Tell Me Tell Me"	Hearn	3:29
6.	"The House of Invention"	Hearn	3:16
7.	"Always Changing"	Hearn	4:04
8.	"See You Again"	Hearn	2:33
9.	"The City of Love"	Hearn	4:12
10.	"Monsters Anonymous"	Hearn, Boothby Graffoe	3:08
Total length:			34:17

== Personnel ==
- Kevin Hearn - Vocals, piano, guitar, accordion, keyboards
- Michael Phillip Wojewoda - Verse drums on 6, theremin on 6 and 10
- Tony Thunder Smith - Drums on 3, 5, 8, and 9
- Rob Kloet - Drums/percussion on 6, 7, and 8
- Bob Scott - Drums on 4
- Chris Gartner - Bass, vocals on 4
- Arnold Robinson - Vocals on 2, 3, 5, 7, 9, and 10
- Brian Macmillan - Vocals on 2, 5, and 7
- Sahara MacDonald - Vocals on 3 and 10
- Jenn Grant - Vocals on 9 and 10
- David Christensen - Bass clarinet on 10
- Maude Hudson - Vocal on 6
- Garth Hudson - Electric piano on 6
- Hawksley Workman - Vocal on 10
- Derek Orford - Vocal on 10
- Boothby Graffoe - Vocal on 10

== Production ==
- Producers: Kevin Hearn, Michael Phillip Wojewoda
- Digital Editing: Kenny Luong
- Mastering: Ted Jenson
- Additional Engineering: Sam Ibbett, David Christensen, Paul Telman
- Artwork: Don Porcella, Ivan Otis, Antoine Moonen
- Drum Programming: Michael Phillip Wojewoda
