= Don Porcella =

American artist (born 1963)

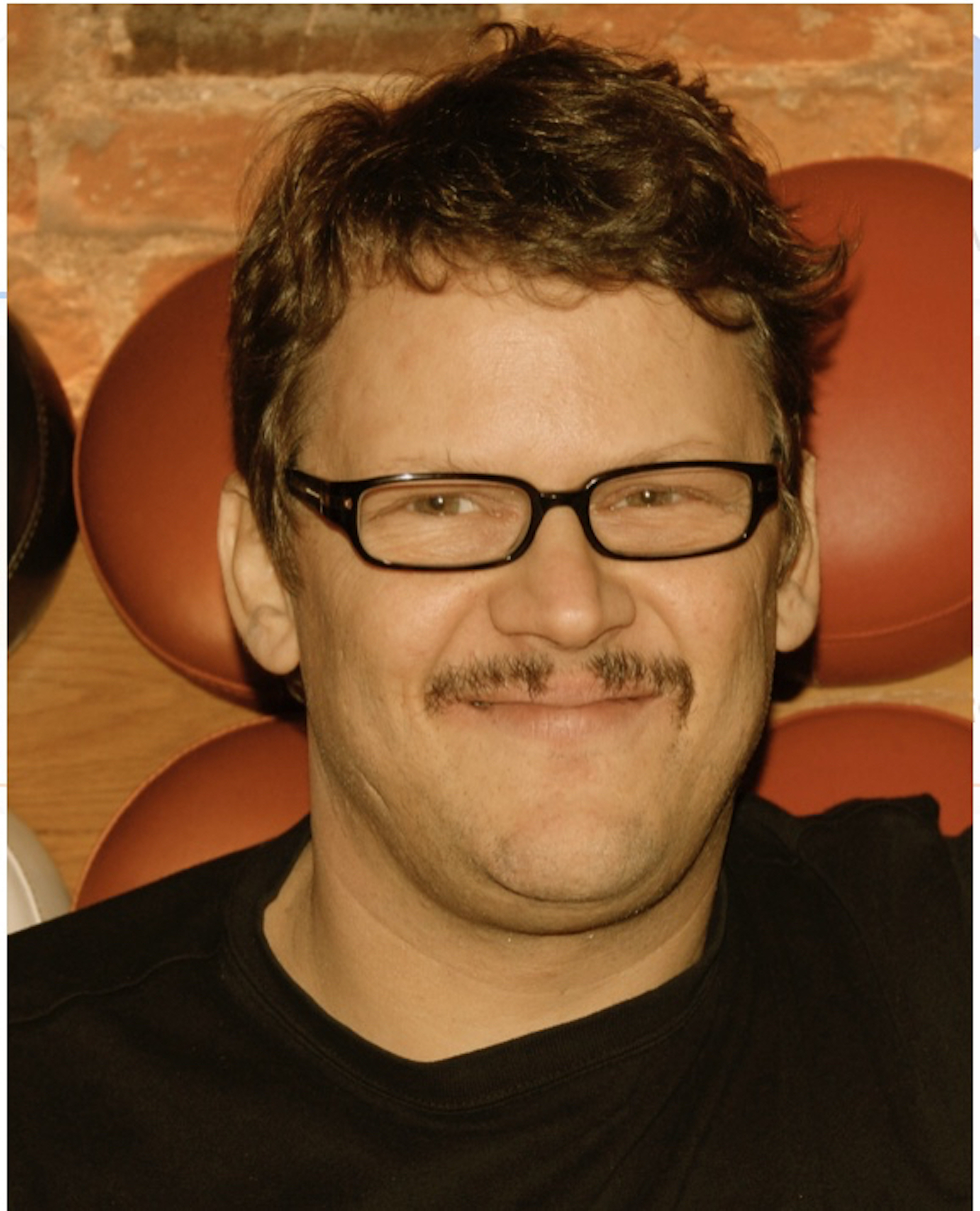
- Don Porcella in Brooklyn, photo by Rich Henricks, 2012.
- Known for: pipe cleaner sculptures, encaustic paintings
- Style: folk art, uses mass-market craft materials
- Website: donporcella.com

Don Porcella (born December 30, 1963) is contemporary American multimedia artist, most known for his pipe cleaner sculptures and encaustic paintings Don Porcella is best known for elevating low-brow, mass-market craft materials into high art. Porcella's subjects are usually inspired by consumerism, nature, the human condition, science fiction and folk art with humor.

== Early life ==
Don Porcella was raised in Modesto, California, the United States of America, youngest son of Robert.S.Porcella, doctor and Yvonne Porcella, a celebrated fiber and textile artist. He got a bachelor's degree in Psychology at the University of California, San Diego, and bachelor's degree in Fine Art from California College of Arts (and Crafts) and earned a Master of Fine Arts degree from Hunter College (CUNY) in New York. He moved to New York in 2001, to pursue his art career, working with prominent artists such as Miriam Schipiro, and David Salle.

== Work ==
Inspired by nature, human evolution, and science fiction, Porcella's work is influenced by his upbringing; his artist mother and physician father made many things by hand, while also celebrating folk art and outsider art. His handmade quality and non-traditional modes of art making are displayed in his drawings, paintings, sculptures and installations.

Porcella often references art historical movements, makes fun of absurd consumer culture, the human condition and alien conspiracy theories that allow the subjective and strange to penetrate humorous representations of a wildly imaginative reality.

His most notable contemporaries are Misaki Kawai, Folkert De Jong and Supercraft artist, Nick Cave.

=== Encaustic paintings ===
Early in his career (2002), Porcella's encaustic paintings were evoked by his childhood memories, suburban pop culture, and comic books. His inventive use of tools and materials of direct application in his encaustic paintings "[...]comical paintings, images like Sasquatch lounging in a pink recliner by a wilderness lake and a mobile home trailer on a fire are embodied in a thick, sensuously waxy medium." First important exhibition was Nick Payne and Don Porcella (2005), reviewed by the New York Times.

=== Sculpture ===
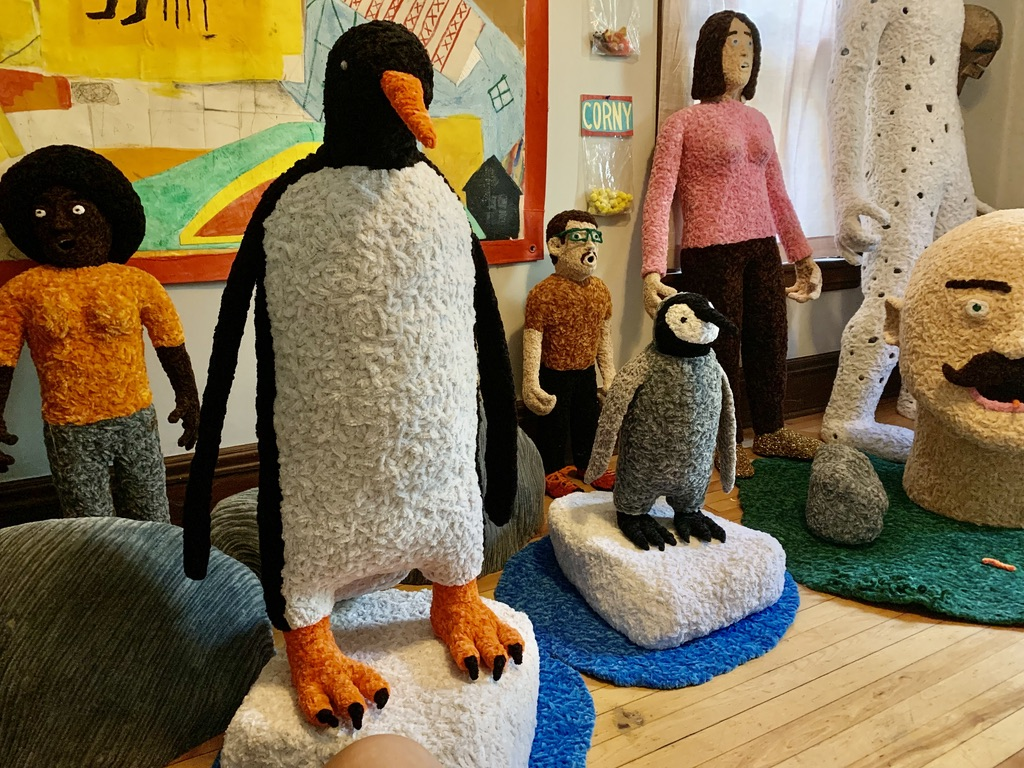
Pipe cleaner sculptures, Don Porcella's studio.

Porcella is best known for his pipe cleaner sculptures and installations using popular craft materials. The hands-on approach, inspired by his mother's fiber art techniques, created an opportunity to invent a weaving technique using pipe cleaners from miniature to large scale textured surfaces of colorful and playful characters. Prominent exhibitions include: his first solo show was Art We There Yet? (2008), Stux Gallery, New York; Don Porcella: Top Flight Projects (2014) Swatch Exhibition Shanghai; The Games We Play, (2018) Hermès, New York, New York; Creatures in Wonderland (2016) Hermès Maison Shanghai, China.

=== Collaborations ===
Collaborations with other artists play a key role in his creative process, including Artists in Motion (1989 -1992), he invented paper bag hats, famous collectors of these hats are Ben & Jerry's and Wavy Gravy; The Drawing Club (2000-2002) East Hampton, NY is a mail art collective making posters, and art for social change; Bonac Tonic Art Collective (2002 - 2009) East Hampton, New York, Make a Wish Foundation art exhibition (2013) New York.

== Collections ==
Porcella's work is part of various private and public collections such as the Swatch Art Collection, The West Collection, Jean Pigozzi, Beth Rudin DeWoody, Eli Broad, Mary Boone, Jeffrey Deitch, and Morgan Spurlock, Kevin Hearn, Minnesota Museum of American Arts, Tucson Museum of Art, Nishiji Collection of Japan, Copelouzos Family Art Museum, Athens, Greece and the NYC Industries for the Blind, New York.

== Music ==
Don Porcella co-wrote the song "Vacuum", a collaboration with Iranian artist Salome MC during the Swatch Art Peace Residency in Shanghai. The music video was later featured in the 2015 Venice Biennale.

His artworks are featured on the album covers of Canadian musician Kevin Hearn (member of Barenaked Ladies): Cloud Maintenance (2011) that is also named after Porcella's painting "Cloud Maintenance Workers" and Dreaming of the 80's (2023), and his art installations also formed the sets in Coming in for the cold (2023) music video, directed by Philip Harder. Porcella is in a long running band of 25 plus years called Face Urchins and recently formed EDF Syndicate, an art band with long time collaborators Russell Ives and Patrick Dintino.

== Exhibitions ==
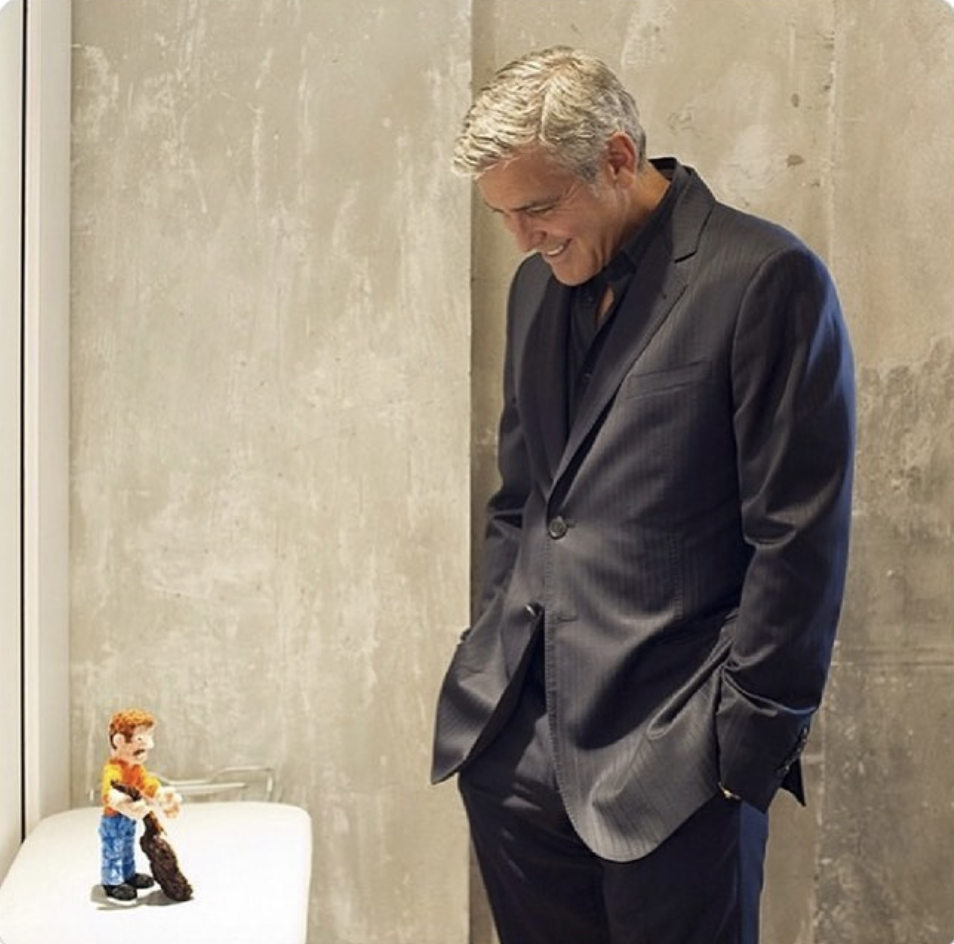
Don Porcella's self portrait and George Clooney at the Swatch Art Exhibition, Shanghai, China, 2014.

He has participated in numerous solo exhibitions, his shows include: Don Porcella: Cave Dwellers (2011) Newhouse Center for Contemporary Art, Staten Island; Fiber in the 21st Century (2011) at the Lehman Art Gallery, Bronx, New York; Don Porcella: Top Flight Projects (2014) Swatch Exhibition Shanghai; Creatures in Wonderland (2016), Hermès Maison Shanghai, China; The Games We Play (2018) Hermès, New York.

He has participated in numerous group exhibitions, including one at the London Art Fair (2007), Art Miami at Art Basel Fair (2008), Robert Miller Gallery (2009), Museum of Art and Design (2010). His work has appeared in Brooklyn Museum (2012); Hudson Valley Center for Contemporary Art (2012); Torrance Art Museum in California (2014), Rockbund Art Museum in China (2014), and Arizona Biennial (2018).

His works have been exhibited internationally at galleries and museums around the world including the United States, China, Greece, Germany, France, Denmark, Colombia and Mexico.

== Grants, awards, and residencies ==
Porcella has received grants from the Council on the Arts and Humanities:

- 2018 MOCA Tucson Summer Intensive Artist-in-Residence, Tucson, AZ
- 2016 High Tech High Chula Vista, Artist-in-Residence, Chula Vista, CA
- 2015 Studio System Artist Residency, Torrance Art Museum, Torrance, CA
- 2015 Featured Artist at San Diego Museum of Art Collector's Group, San Diego, CA
- 2014 Swatch Art Residency, Shanghai, China
- 2014 Grier School, Artist-in-Residence, Pennsylvania
- 2013 Owl's Head Contemporary Art Award Mural, Brooklyn, NY
- 2013 Ensworth School, Artist-in-Residence, Nashville, TN
- 2012 West Collects Prize, Oaks, PA
- 2012 Museum of Arts and Design, Artist-in-Residence, NY, NY
- 2011 Emerging Artists Fellowship from Socrates Sculpture Park, NY, NY
- 2011 DCA Grant from the Brooklyn Arts Council, Brooklyn, NY
- 2010 DCA Premier Grant from COAHSI, Staten Island, NY
- 2010 NYSCA Original Work Grant from COAHSI, Staten Island, NY
- 2008 ISE Award, Japan

== Media coverage and publication ==
Poreclla's work has been featured in the Arts Magazine, CRAFT, Elle, Museum of Art and Design, New York Press, The New York Times, NY Arts, Fiber Arts Magazine, Chelsea Now, San Francisco magazine, The Village Voice, and the Los Angeles Times.
