= Barenaked for Hanukkah E.P. =

Barenaked for Hanukkah EP

EP by Barenaked Ladies
- Released: November 15, 2005
- Recorded: 2004
- Genre: Alternative rock
- Length: 6:08
- Label: Desperation Records
- Producer: Barenaked Ladies

Barenaked Ladies chronology
As You Like It (2005)	Barenaked for Hanukkah (2005)	Barenaked Ladies Are Me (2006)

Barenaked For Hanukkah in an EP released by Barenaked Ladies on November 15, 2005. It contains two tracks from the holiday-themed Barenaked for the Holidays, and one live version of a track from that album.

== Track listing ==
No.	Title	Writer(s)	Lead vocal(s)	Length
1.	"Hanukkah, Oh Hanukkah" (Live)	Traditional	Steven Page	2:31
2.	"Hanukkah Blessings" (Album version)	Page	Page	3:26
3.	"I Have a Little Dreidel" (Album Version)	Mikhl Gelbart, Samuel Goldfarb	Page	0:51
Total length:				6:08

== Certifications ==
The EP was certified gold in Canada.
