= Days in Frames =

Studio album by Kevin Hearn
- Released: November 25, 2014
- Recorded: 2013–2014
- Genre: Alternative
- Length: 34:41
- Label: Roaring Girl Records
- Producers: Kevin Hearn, Gavin Brown

Kevin Hearn chronology
| Cloud Maintenance (2011) | Days in Frames (2014) |

Days in Frames is a solo album by Kevin Hearn. It is his third solo album, and his seventh solo release including his Thin Buckle releases. The album was made available for pre-order on iTunes November 17, 2014, and was made available for streaming on CBC Music Canada on November 18. The album was released November 25, 2014. The song "Midnight Sun" was dedicated to Shuvinai Ashoona an Inuk artist who had painted a guitar for Hearn.

== Track listing ==
| No. | Title | Writer(s) | Length |
|---|---|---|---|
| 1. | "Gallerina" | Kevin Hearn | 4:13 |
| 2. | "Cathedral" | Kevin Hearn | 4:35 |
| 3. | "Floating" | Kevin Hearn & Lou Reed | 3:57 |
| 4. | "Melody/Memory" | Kevin Hearn | 4:13 |
| 5. | "Up Above" | Kevin Hearn | 3:10 |
| 6. | "You Wrecked Me" | Kevin Hearn | 3:42 |
| 7. | "Best Day Yet" | Kevin Hearn | 4:17 |
| 8. | "Midnight Sun" | Kevin Hearn | 3:01 |
| 9. | "Sugar Water" | Kevin Hearn | 2:48 |
| 10. | "Crossing Over" | Kevin Hearn | 2:05 |
| Total length: | | | 34:41 |

== Singles ==
The first single from the album, Gallerina, was released November 8, 2014. Those who pre-ordered the album on iTunes received an automatic download of the single.
