= Another Postcard =

2003 single by Barenaked Ladies

Single by Barenaked Ladies

from the album Everything to Everyone
- B-side: "Next Time" (acoustic)
- Released: September 8, 2003
- Length: 3:25
- Label: Reprise
- Songwriters: Steven Page; Ed Robertson
- Producer: Ron Aniello

Barenaked Ladies singles chronology
"Thanks That Was Fun" (2001)	"Another Postcard" (2003)	"Testing 1,2,3" (2004)

Music video
- "Another Postcard" on YouTube

"Another Postcard" (sometimes subtitled "Chimps") is a song by the Canadian rock band Barenaked Ladies. It was released as the lead single from their sixth studio album, Everything to Everyone, which was released after the band took a nearly two-year hiatus from performing. The song is notable for its reggae-rap verses. The verses are rapped by Ed Robertson while the chorus and bridge are led by Steven Page. The two co-wrote the track. The song was used and featured in the end credits and on the soundtrack of the 2008 American film Space Chimps.

== Content ==
The song is a story told by a protagonist who explains his situation. He has been receiving anonymous postcards with images of chimpanzees on the front. The verses explain the situation while the pre-choruses list various types of chimpanzees on some of the postcards.

The song was inspired when a neighbour of Page's sent a postcard depicting a chimpanzee to one of Page's children. This inspired the plot of the song. It was originally written as a joke song but became the first single off the album.

A sizable portion of the band's fanbase saw the song for little more than its trivial subject matter. The selection of the song as a single was attributed to the band's record company Reprise Records and was seen as an attempt to recapture the success of similarly rap-inspired singles "One Week" and "Pinch Me". The song was not particularly successful and did not attain the success of the two aforementioned songs, each being the first single from one of the band's two preceding albums (Stunt and Maroon respectively).

== Music video ==
The music video for the song was directed by Phil Harder who directed many of the band's later videos. The video is a parody of the B-movie monster/disaster genre and is split between two sets of scenes. The first is a disaster movie style film in which the band (under pseudonyms and in costume) avoided fake rubble in an attack by a giant chimpanzee, shot intentionally campy and interspersed with actual footage from the disaster film Earthquake. The second set of scenes are performance, filmed in a round room with windows, intended to be inside Toronto's CN Tower (although the set the band plays in is not based on the actual interior). At the end, the CN Tower becomes a rocket and launches into outer space carrying the chimpanzee with it, a la Gamera. In the music video, the band's keyboardist Kevin Hearn is playing a Nord synthesizer.

== Personnel ==
- Ed Robertson – lead vocals, acoustic guitar
- Steven Page – lead vocals, electric guitar
- Jim Creeggan – double bass, background vocals
- Kevin Hearn – keyboards, background vocals
- Tyler Stewart – drums, background vocals
- "Chimp Chorus":
  - Anna Hill
  - Chris Wonzer
  - Eric Sarafin
  - Keith Rudyk
  - Kevin "Chad" Robinson
  - Pierre Tremblay
  - Steven McDonald

== Charts ==
=== Weekly charts ===
Chart (2003)	Peak position
Canada (Nielsen SoundScan)	28
US Billboard Hot 100	82
US Adult Alternative Airplay (Billboard)	14
US Adult Pop Airplay (Billboard)	9

=== Year-end charts ===
Chart (2003)	Position
US Adult Top 40 (Billboard)	48

Chart (2004)	Position
US Adult Top 40 (Billboard)	45
