= Barenaked for the Holidays =

Studio album by Barenaked Ladies
- Released: October 5, 2004
- Recorded: May 17–29, 2004
- Genre: Alternative rock; holiday; comedy
- Length: 46:28
- Label: Desperation
- Producer: Barenaked Ladies

Barenaked Ladies chronology
Everything to Everyone (2003)	Barenaked for the Holidays (2004)	As You Like It (2005)

Professional ratings
Review scores
Source	Rating
Allmusic	3/5 stars
Encyclopedia of Popular Music	2/5 stars
Popmatters	mixed to favorable
Rolling Stone	favorable
Sputnikmusic	4/5 stars

Barenaked for the Holidays is a holiday-themed studio album released by Canadian band Barenaked Ladies on October 5, 2004. The album includes Christmas and Hanukkah songs as well as "Auld Lang Syne", which is traditionally sung on New Year's Eve. There are also several songs that are simply about the winter season. The album was the first album recorded at Steven Page's studio, Fresh Baked Woods and was the first released independently by Barenaked Ladies' Desperation Records label (and distributed by the Warner Music Group). It was the band's first studio album for which a "naked track" (recorded in the nude) was not recorded. This album achieved Gold status in Canada.

Barenaked Ladies also collaborated with fellow Canadian artists Sarah McLachlan ("God Rest Ye Merry Gentlemen", originally recorded in August 1996) and a then relatively unknown Michael Bublé ("Elf's Lament").

== Production ==
While the album contains some faithful interpretations of traditional songs, much of the album plays true to Ladies' off-kilter spirit. "Jingle Bells" begins as a slow, faithful rendition before breaking into an up-tempo version, including the "Batman smells..." lyric variation, and Page breaking down laughing. Several existing songs are included in the form of keyboard interludes; "Happy Birthday to You" is included as a hidden track in the form "Happy Birthday Jesus". The song "Deck the Stills" is an adaptation or parody of the song "Deck the Halls" with the lyrics "Crosby, Stills, Nash & Young" repeated in place of the real lyrics (it was an in-joke with the band at the time to use these lyrics in other songs). The album also includes the Band Aid charity song, "Do They Know It's Christmas?", all the royalties from which the band donates to the Stephen Lewis Foundation. The collaboration with Sarah McLachlan for "God Rest Ye Merry Gentlemen" was released on a prior compilation, Christmas Songs, in 2000. Finally, the album includes seven songs written by the band.

The album was a popular release during the Christmas season of 2004, and reached No. 64 in the regular Billboard album charts. Barenaked Ladies promoted the album with the Barenaked for the Holidays Tour in 2004 and 2005.

Former member Steven Page later admitted that the album was not his idea, and that a holiday themed album was not what he wanted to do following Everything to Everyone.

== Releases ==
=== E.P. Version ===
An E.P. of Hanukkah-themed songs named the Barenaked for Hanukkah E.P. was released as a digital download on November 15, 2005. It contains a live version of "Hanukkah, O Hanukkah" from the band's Toronto concert on November 20, 2004, as well as the album versions of "Hanukkah Blessings" and "I Have a Little Dreidel". It was certified gold in Canada.

=== Barenaked on a Stick ===
Barenaked on a Stick is a 128MB USB flash drive that contains the Holidays CD, live songs and ad libs, a demo recording, videos of the album recording, promo photos and buddy icons for instant messaging programs. It was sold initially at the 2005 holiday concert tour, and then through Nettwerk's online store, and though Amazon.com. The USB stick was part of a product test by the band to see if there was a market for releasing albums on reusable media. Their next album Barenaked Ladies Are Me was also released on USB flash drive, as were subsequent live recordings.

== Rock Band ==
The song "Hanukkah Blessings" was released on the Rock Band music store on December 23, 2008.

== Spinoff recordings ==
In 2023 American jazz composer Jeff Novotny released a bossa nova version of "Elf's Lament" entitled "The Billion-Dollar Washing Machine".

== Track listing ==
No.	Title	Writer(s)	Lead vocals	Length
1.	"Jingle Bells"	James Lord Pierpont	Steven Page	3:57
2.	"Green Christmas" (re-recorded; originally from the 2000 soundtrack for How the Grinch Stole Christmas)	Steven Page, Ed Robertson	Ed Robertson	2:34
3.	"I Saw Three Ships"	William Sandys/traditional	Kevin Hearn, Page, Robertson	1:07
4.	"Hanukkah Blessings"	Steven Page	Steven Page	3:27
5.	"O Holy Night"	Adolphe Adam		1:09
6.	"Elf's Lament"	Ed Robertson	Michael Bublé, Page, Robertson	3:34
7.	"Snowman"	Ed Robertson	Ed Robertson	2:59
8.	"Do They Know It's Christmas?" (Previously released in a live version)	Bob Geldof, Midge Ure	Page, Robertson, Tyler Stewart	3:32
9.	"Hanukkah, Oh Hanukkah"	Mordkhe (Mark) Rivesman	Page	2:11
10.	"God Rest Ye Merry Gentlemen"/"We Three Kings" (originally recorded backstage at WPLT Planetfest, August 1996)	Samuel Wesley/traditional / John Henry Hopkins Jr.	Sarah McLachlan, Robertson	3:26
11.	"Rudolph the Red-Nosed Reindeer"	Johnny Marks		0:59
12.	"Carol of the Bells"	Mykola Leontovych, Peter Wilhousky		3:00
13.	"Footprints"	Ed Robertson	Ed Robertson	3:14
14.	"Deck the Stills"	Thomas Oliphant, arranged by Barenaked Ladies	Jim Creeggan, Hearn, Page, Robertson, Stewart	0:32
15.	"Christmastime (Oh Yeah)" (Re-recorded; originally with Page on vocals for a compilation album)	Kevin Hearn	Kevin Hearn	2:16
16.	"Sleigh Ride"	Leroy Anderson, Mitchell Parish	Creeggan, Hearn, Page, Robertson	0:46
17.	"Christmas Pics"	Jim Creeggan	Jim Creeggan	2:13
18.	"I Have a Little Dreidel"	Samuel E. Goldfarb, Samuel S. Grossman	Page, Robertson	0:52
19.	"Wonderful Christmastime"/"Happy Birthday" (hidden track)	Paul McCartney (Wonderful Christmastime); Patty Hill, Mildred J. Hill (Happy Birthday)	Creeggan, Hearn, Page, Robertson, Stewart (Happy Birthday)	1:18
20.	"Auld Lang Syne"	Robert Burns/traditional	Page, Robertson	3:04

== Personnel ==
Barenaked Ladies

- Steven Page – vocals, guitar
- Ed Robertson – vocals, guitar
- Jim Creeggan – bass, vocals
- Tyler Stewart – drums, percussion, vocals
- Kevin Hearn – keyboards, piano, accordion, vocals

Additional personnel

- Michael Bublé – vocals
- Kelly Maureen McKenna – mandolin, guitar, vocals
- Sarah McLachlan – vocals

Production

- Jeremy Darby – engineer
- Michael Phillip Wojewoda – mixing
- Ted Jensen – mastering
- Don Garbutt – digital editing
- Paul Forgues – assistant
- Rob Menegoni – technical assistance
- Keith Rudyk – technical assistance
- Barenaked Ladies – arranger
- Andrew MacNaughton – photography
- John Rummen – artwork
