= H-Wing =

Studio album by Kevin Hearn and Thin Buckle
- Released: November 29, 2001
- Producer: Jeremy Darby; Michael Phillip Wojewoda; Kevin Hearn

Kevin Hearn and Thin Buckle chronology
Mothball Mint (Hearn solo) (1997)	H-Wing (2001)	Night Light (2004)

H-Wing is the first album by Kevin Hearn and Thin Buckle. It was released in 2001 and features the band's original lineup. It was produced by Jeremy Darby, Michael Phillip Wojewoda, and Kevin Hearn. The title of the album comes from a hospital wing Kevin was in while he was being treated for leukemia, where he wrote much of the album. The band's only single to date, "Driftwood", is from this album, and a music video was made for that song.

The album was packaged in a digipack with a standard jewel case booklet included within.

== Track listing ==
1. "The Good One"
2. "The Diving Board"
3. "Driftwood"
4. "Death Bed Love Letter"
5. "Bonefight"
6. "The Blue Museum"
7. "Spider Arm"
8. "In the Minnow Trap"
9. "Mouth of a Shadow"
10. "Anna, Anastasia"
11. "A Beginning"
