= Havana Winter =

Studio album by Kevin Hearn and Thin Buckle
- Released: July 30, 2009
- Recorded: October 2007 – October 2008
- Length: 31:25
- Label: Warner Music Canada
- Producer: Kevin Hearn and Michael Phillip Wojewoda

Kevin Hearn and Thin Buckle chronology
The Miracle Mile (2003)	Havana Winter (2009)	Cloud Maintenance (2011)

Havana Winter is the fourth album by Kevin Hearn and Thin Buckle. It was released on July 30, 2009. Kevin Hearn wrote all of the tracks on the album, which was produced by Hearn and Michael Phillip Wojewoda. It was packaged in a double-fold digipak, with no booklet or liner notes.

Guests on the album include Lou Reed, Mary Margaret O'Hara, Chantal Kreviazuk, John McDermott and Laurie Anderson.

== Reception ==
PopMatters wrote, "[H]is songs have almost surprising depth at times. They're light, and they don't force; they don't come to you. You go to them with a nugget of curiosity, and then you realize they're not as light as you think."

== Track listing ==
No.	Title	Writer(s)	Length
1.	"Coma"	Kevin Hearn	5:09
2.	"On The Runway"	Hearn	3:47
3.	"Reeling"	Hearn	5:04
4.	"Luna"	Hearn	3:57
5.	"Huntsville.ca"	Hearn	3:55
6.	"In The Shade"	Hearn	3:32
7.	"Helicopter in the Sand"	Hearn	6:04
Total length:			31:36

== Personnel ==
Kevin Hearn and Thinbuckle

- Kevin Hearn - Vocals, piano, keyboards, guitar, lead guitar on 7
- Chris Gartner - Bass, backing vocals
- Brian Macmillan - Slide guitar, backing vocals, synthesizer on 2
- Bob Scott - Drums
- Mike Rathke - Electric guitar, lead guitar on 2

Additional personnel

- Mike Olsen - Cello on 2
- Chantal Kreviazuk - Vocals on 1, 2, and 4
- John MacDermott - Vocals on 6
- Lou Reed - Lead guitar on 1, moog guitar on 6 and 7
- Laurie Anderson - Violin on 3
- Mary Margaret O'Hara - Vocals on 3
- Richard Underhill - Saxophones on 5
- Tony Thunder Smith - Vocal on 6

== Production ==
- Producers: Kevin Hearn, Michael Phillip Wojewoda
- Mixing: Michael Phillip Wojewoda, Eric Kramer
- Digital Editing: Kenny Luong
- Mastering: Ted Jensen
