= The Miracle Mile =

Studio album by Kevin Hearn and Thin Buckle
- Released: July 11, 2006
- Length: 41:41
- Label: Warner Music Canada
- Producer: Kevin Hearn w/ Michael Phillip Wojewoda; Jim Scott; Jeremy Darby

Kevin Hearn and Thin Buckle chronology
Night Light (2004)	The Miracle Mile (2006)	Havana Winter (2009)

The Miracle Mile is the third album by Kevin Hearn and Thin Buckle. It was released in Canada and online July 11, 2006. The first single from the album will be "In The Country". This is the band's first album on the Warner Music Canada label. The album is billed as a collection of songs that explore dreams and disappointments, love and loss.

At least part of the album was written during a stay in downtown Los Angeles, California on a particularly famous stretch of the Wilshire Boulevard between Fairfax and Western Avenues known as the Miracle Mile. The album contains songwriting collaborations with Ron Sexsmith and Barenaked Ladies bandmate Steven Page. It also features a string arrangement from Van Dyke Parks on the title track.

The album is the first for band member Brian MacMillan. Former member Derek Orford, while not credited as a full band member, performs on four tracks as a musical guest. Other musical guests include Kurt Swinghammer, Kevin Fox, Jim Creeggan, Selina Martin, Jennifer Foster, and co-producer Michael Phillip Wojewoda.

The album was released in Canada in various online digital stores and as a physical CD. Like the band's first two releases, the physical release was packaged in a Digipak. Unlike those releases, however, it was a three-panel (double-fold) Digipak, and no liner notes booklet was included.

== Track listing ==
1. "Rescue Us" (Hearn, Sexsmith) – 3:37
2. "Lancaster Bomber" (Hearn) – 4:24
3. "Map of the Human Genome" (Hearn) – 4:29
4. "In the Country" (Hearn) – 2:54
5. "Southbound" (Hearn, Orford) – 3:16
6. "Here for You" (Hearn, Sexsmith) – 4:16
7. "The Good Times Virus" (Hearn, Page) – 3:21
8. "High and Low" (Hearn, Sexsmith) – 3:58
9. "Statue of Los Angeles" (Hearn) – 3:05
10. "Hollow" (Hearn) – 3:13
11. "The Miracle Mile" (Hearn) – 5:08
