= Celebrity (Barenaked Ladies song) =

Single by Barenaked Ladies

from the album Everything to Everyone
- Released: May 15, 2004
- Genre: Alternative rock
- Length: 3:27
- Label: Reprise
- Songwriters: Kevin Hearn; Steven Page; Ed Robertson
- Producer: Ron Aniello

Barenaked Ladies singles chronology
"Testing 1,2,3" (2004)	"Celebrity" (2004)	"For You" (2004)

"Celebrity" is a song by Canadian band Barenaked Ladies released from their album Everything to Everyone. The song was released as a single in the United Kingdom, peaking at No. 81.

The song was written by Kevin Hearn, Steven Page, and Ed Robertson.

== Track list ==
1. "Celebrity"
2. "Yes! Yes!! Yes!!!"
3. "War On Drugs" (Demo Version)

== Personnel ==
- Steven Page – lead vocals, acoustic guitar
- Ed Robertson – electric guitar, background vocals
- Jim Creeggan – electric bass, background vocals
- Kevin Hearn – piano, background vocals
- Tyler Stewart – drums

== Charts ==
Chart (2004)	Peak position
Scottish Singles Sales (Official Charts)	79
UK Singles (Official Charts)	81
