= You Run Away =

Single by Barenaked Ladies

from the album All in Good Time
- Released: January 11, 2010
- Recorded: April 2009
- Genre: Alternative rock
- Length: 4:22 (Album Version); 3:54 (Radio Edit)
- Label: Raisin' Records
- Songwriter: Ed Robertson
- Producer: Michael Phillip Wojewoda

Barenaked Ladies singles chronology
"Drawing" (2008)	"You Run Away" (2010)	"Every Subway Car (Feat. Erin McCarley)" (2010)

"You Run Away" is a song by Canadian rock band Barenaked Ladies. It is the first single from their album All in Good Time. It was released January 8 for online streaming. The commercial download single was released February 2, 2010.

== History ==
"You Run Away" was written by Ed Robertson, and was partially inspired by Steven Page's departure from the band in February 2009.

The music video for "You Run Away" was released on February 22, 2010, making it their first music video they have actually appeared in since 2003's "Testing 1,2,3". The song's video uses the radio edit of the song, which cuts half of the instrumental intro, and half of the second chorus which is a double-chorus on the album version. The two halves of the chorus are cross-mixed between "you could turn and stay" and "but you run away from me".

== Steven Page's response ==
When the single was first released, Page tweeted that it was a "low blow" and that it "sucks being a target". In a 2010 interview, he elaborated, "They’ve denied it until they’re blue in the face, I know what it’s like to write songs with Ed - not everything is a specific address to somebody else, but I also know that we’ve written songs about other people. Usually it’s been fairly veiled and we are trying to make a point. But it was pretty obvious what he was talking about. I felt like some of [the lyrics weren’t] true, first of all, but it made for a good song, and for me, for a guy who’s worked with him for so long, I felt like they could’ve done better, frankly. I know they have the potential to be really great and I know they believe in what they’re doing, but none of it made me want to go back in the band, which was good for me. I didn’t listen to that and go: 'God, I wish I was up on stage playing that with them.'"

During a 2018 live show after playing the song "War on Drugs", Page joked "You get a sense of what the show is now? Subtitle: 'Steve sings songs from all the biggest albums, but the biggest bummer on each one'. This [next] one's called You Run Away...well it was a bummer for me."

== Charts ==
Chart (2010)	Peak position
Canada Hot 100 (Billboard)	25
Canada AC (Billboard)	5
US Adult Alternative Airplay (Billboard)	19
US Adult Pop Airplay (Billboard)	21
