= As You Like It (Barenaked Ladies album) =

2005 album

Studio album by Barenaked Ladies
- Released: June 3, 2005
- Recorded: 2005
- Genre: Alternative rock
- Length: 26:18
- Label: Desperation Records
- Producers: Paul Forgues, Steven Page

Barenaked Ladies chronology
Barenaked for the Holidays (2004)	As You Like It (2005)	Barenaked for Hanukkah (EP) (2005)

As You Like It is a William Shakespeare-themed studio album released by Canadian band Barenaked Ladies on June 3, 2005. The album was recorded for the Stratford Shakespeare Festival of 2005. This CD was only made available at the festival.

== Track listing ==
All lyrics by William Shakespeare. All songs arranged by Steven Page, except where noted.

No.	Title	Length
1.	"In the Orchard"	0:33
2.	"It Was a Lover and His Lass"	1:33
3.	"The Party" (Barenaked Ladies)	0:46
4.	"If Music Be the Food of Love"	2:26
5.	"Fight Setup" (Barenaked Ladies)	0:13
6.	"Wrestling" (Barenaked Ladies)	1:04
7.	"Rosalind and Orlando" (Barenaked Ladies)	3:01
8.	"Into Arden"	0:57
9.	"Under the Greenwood Tree"	2:05
10.	"The Party II" (Barenaked Ladies)	0:28
11.	"Banished" (Jim Creeggan, Steven Page)	0:33
12.	"Blow, Blow Thou Winter Wind"	3:20
13.	"Orlando's Poems"	0:40
14.	"Come Sweet Audrey"	0:48
15.	"They Shall Be Married Tomorrow" (Jim Creeggan, Steven Page)	0:34
16.	"Deer Song"	1:07
17.	"Hymen's Wedding"	3:29
18.	"It Was a Lover and His Lass (reprise)"	1:13
19.	"Curtain Call"	1:34

== Personnel ==
Barenaked Ladies

- Jim Creeggan – bass guitar, vocals, double bass
- Kevin Hearn – mandolin, piano, accordion, keyboards, vocals, vibraphone
- Steven Page – acoustic guitar, electric guitar, vocals
- Ed Robertson – acoustic guitar, electric guitar, vocals
- Tyler Stewart – percussion, drums, vocals

Production

- Engineer: Antonio Cimolino
- Mixing: Paul Forgues, Steven Page
- Designer: Santo Loquasto
- Choreographer: Donna Feore
- Assistant: Paul Forgues
- Lighting designer: Steven Hawkins
- Fight Director: John Stead
- Sound designer: Jim Neil
- Artwork: Little C at Artwerks
