= Mothball Mint =

Studio album by Kevin Hearn
- Released: 1997
- Recorded: Winter 1996
- Genre: Alternative rock
- Length: 40:22
- Label: Page Publications
- Producer: Michael Phillip Wojewoda

Kevin Hearn chronology
Mothball Mint (1997)	H-Wing (2001)

Mothball Mint is a solo CD by Kevin Hearn, keyboardist of Barenaked Ladies. This album was produced by Michael Phillip Wojewoda and released in 1997.

Kevin is accompanied on the album by many Toronto-area musicians who were friends of his, including all of the original members of his then-future band, Thin Buckle. One solo track originates from the Chicago Barenaked Ladies show from which the Rock Spectacle album was recorded. The rest of the album was recorded in a studio. All of the studio tracks feature Bob Scott on drums. Bass duties on the album are split between Barenaked Ladies colleague Jim Creeggan, and Chris Gartner. Martin Tielli and Derek Orford each play guitar on several tracks. Various other musicians contribute to the album.

Kevin still plays several songs off the album regularly (and some occasionally) when he plays with Thin Buckle.

== Track listing ==
No.	Title	Writer(s)	Length
1.	"Potbelly"	Kevin Hearn	2:41
2.	"Nine"	Hearn	2:54
3.	"Horizon"	Hearn	2:58
4.	"Rise And Fall Down Again"	Hearn	3:24
5.	"Knots"	Hearn	3:45
6.	"Run Down Shack"	Hearn	3:17
7.	"Bus Depot (Hometown)"	Hearn	3:30
8.	"This Is It" (Live)	Hearn	1:29
9.	"Insomnia"	Hearn	4:02
10.	"Oh Glowworm"	Hearn, Chris Gartner, Bob Scott	5:15
11.	"Boatride To Bubbly Bay"	Hearn	2:24
12.	"Saving Up For Trouble"	Hearn	4:48
Total length:			40:22

== Personnel ==
- Kevin Hearn – Vocals, guitar, piano, banjo, melodica, accordion, organ, samples
- Bob Scott – Drums, milk jug, train
- Jim Creeggan – Bass, vocals
- Andy Creeggan – Percussion, vocals
- Michael Johnson – Trumpet
- James M. Stager – Trombone
- Michael Phillip Wojewoda – Vocals, tambourine
- Martin Tielli – Guitar
- Derek Orford – Guitar
- Sean Cullen – Vocals, evil hag of the shack
- Don Garbutt – Arp whistle, vocal processing, programming, accordion, technos acxel
- Chris Gartner – Bass
- Anthony Brown – Vocals
- Julie Stewart – Vocals

== Production ==
- Producers: Michael Phillip Wojewoda
- Assistance: James Paul, Jessica Grant, Tom Heron
- Engineer: Jono Grant, Don Garbutt
- Mastering: Joao Carvalho
- Photography: Harland Williams, Wayne Parent, John Williams, Kevin Hearn
- Designer: Graphicjam Digital Arts
