= Everything to Everyone (album) =

2003 album by Barenaked Ladies

Studio album by Barenaked Ladies
- Released: October 21, 2003
- Length: 50:40
- Label: Reprise
- Producer: Ron Aniello

Barenaked Ladies chronology
| Everything Acoustic (2003) | Everything to Everyone (2003) | Barenaked for the Holidays (2004) |

Singles from Everything to Everyone
- 1. "Another Postcard" Released: September 8, 2003; 2. "Testing 1,2,3" Released: February 9, 2004; 3. "Celebrity" Released: May 15, 2004; 4. "For You" Released: June 8, 2004; 5. "Maybe Katie"

Professional ratings
Aggregate scores
| Source | Rating |
|---|---|
| Metacritic | 56/100 |
Review scores
| Source | Rating |
| Allmusic | 3/5 stars |
| Blender | 2/5 stars |
| Consequence of Sound | 5/5 stars |
| Encyclopedia of Popular Music | 3/5 stars |
| Entertainment Weekly | B |
| NOW | 3/5 stars |
| Popmatters | 6/10 stars |
| Q | 2/5 stars |
| Rolling Stone | 2/5 stars |
| The Rolling Stone Album Guide | 2/5 stars |

Everything to Everyone (commonly abbreviated E2E) is the sixth full-length studio album by Barenaked Ladies. It was released in 2003 and was produced by Ron Aniello. Singles from the album include "Another Postcard", "Testing 1, 2, 3", "Celebrity", "For You" and "Maybe Katie". The content of the album is noted for its increased political commentary over previous albums. This was their last album with Reprise Records (or any major label for that matter) before switching to a more independent label, Desperation Records and subsequently Raisin' Records.

== Creative process ==
After an intensive period of recording and touring from 1995 to 2001, Barenaked Ladies (BNL) entered their first extended hiatus in 2002, lasting until most of 2003. Upon returning to the studio to record Everything to Everyone, the band instituted a new policy of keeping songwriting exclusively within the group. This decision led to increased contributions from Jim Creeggan and Kevin Hearn, resulting in a larger number of tracks, ultimately culminating in a 14-song album with an additional bonus track. The album, recorded in Los Angeles, marked the band's first project after launching an online blog, which provided fans with continuous updates and insights into their creative process.

During the latter stages of recording, the band utilized the facility's B-studio to produce acoustic versions of the album's tracks. Drummer Tyler Stewart improvised a drum kit from unconventional objects, and the band performed acoustic renditions of eleven songs, omitting "Shopping," "Unfinished," "War on Drugs," and the bonus track "Yes! Yes!! Yes!!!" This acoustic session was deemed successful, leading to a similar approach for their subsequent album, Barenaked Ladies Are Me (aka BLAM).

The album cover, painted by Canadian artist Chris Woods, features a profile of the band members holding a white flag of surrender. The album title was initially displayed as a sticker on the transparent wrapping to maintain the flag's symbolism. The special edition featured the title on a clear plastic sleeve, aligned with the flag's waves. The original 60" x 60" oil painting reportedly hangs in Steven Page’s farmhouse studio, Fresh Baked Woods.

Several tracks recorded during these sessions were not included on the final album, including:

- "Statue of Los Angeles" (unreleased) – a Hearn composition later released on his album The Miracle Mile.
- "Sign Me Up" (unreleased) – described as a profanity-laden track.
- "Adrift" – re-recorded for BLAM and released on Stop Us If You've Heard This One Before
- "What a Let Down" – re-recorded for BLAM
- "I Can, I Will, I Do" – re-recorded for BLAM; featured on iTunes Originals - Barenaked Ladies; later released on Stop Us If You've Heard This One Before.
- "Yes! Yes!! Yes!!!" – bonus track on the special edition DVD and the UK single for "Celebrity"; later released on Stop Us If You've Heard This One Before

Continuing a tradition from their early albums, the band recorded the song "Sign Me Up" entirely in the nude. Everything to Everyone was the final BNL album to include a track recorded in this fashion.

== Release ==
Everything to Everyone was issued in three distinct editions:

1. standard 14-track version.
2. limited edition featuring three bonus tracks from an acoustic session, identified by a special sticker.
3. special edition presented in a threefold digipack with a plastic sleeve, containing the standard CD and a bonus DVD titled "Everything Else." The DVD included DVD-Audio of the album with the additional track "Yes! Yes!! Yes!!!", as well as both video and stereo-audio formats of the acoustic session and various studio video clips.

The lead single, "Another Postcard," was perceived by many fans as an effort by the record label to replicate the success of previous hits "One Week" from Stunt and "Pinch Me" from Maroon, due to its similar style and rap-based vocals. Despite promotional appearances on major U.S. talk shows, the single did not achieve notable success. The band supported the album with the U.S. Peepshow Tour, which deviated from typical promotional efforts, appearing to cater more to dedicated fans than to a broader audience. Everything to Everyone debuted in the Top 10 in both Canada and the U.S. but experienced a swift decline on the charts. It became only the band's second album, following 1994's Maybe You Should Drive, to not achieve at least Gold certification in the U.S.

The album's second single, "Testing 1,2,3," was released in early 2004, accompanied by a music video and coinciding with a more conventional arena tour. In Canada, "Maybe Katie" was released as a radio single. However, the album did not experience a significant sales revival.

A third single, "For You," was released as a CD single featuring both the album version and a live recording from Glasgow, Scotland, but it did not receive a music video and garnered minimal airplay. In the UK, "Celebrity" was issued as a radio and commercial single, but it similarly failed to gain traction.

=== DualDisc version ===
Everything to Everyone was included among a group of 15 DualDisc releases that were test marketed in Boston and Seattle. It contains the standard CD album on one side, and bonus DVD material on the second side. The DualDisc version has not been reissued.

== Track listing ==
All tracks are written by Steven Page and Ed Robertson, except where noted.

| No. | Title | Writer(s) | Lead vocals | Length |
|---|---|---|---|---|
| 1. | "Celebrity" | Kevin Hearn; Page; Robertson | Steven Page | 3:27 |
| 2. | "Maybe Katie" | Jim Creeggan; Page; Robertson | Steven Page, Ed Robertson | 2:58 |
| 3. | "Another Postcard" | | Steven Page, Ed Robertson | 3:25 |
| 4. | "Next Time" | Creeggan; Hearn; Page; Robertson | Steven Page | 3:51 |
| 5. | "For You" | | Ed Robertson | 3:27 |
| 6. | "Shopping" | Hearn; Page; Robertson | Steven Page | 3:34 |
| 7. | "Testing 1,2,3" | | Ed Robertson | 3:32 |
| 8. | "Upside Down" | | Steven Page | 3:15 |
| 9. | "War on Drugs" | | Steven Page | 5:32 |
| 10. | "Aluminum" | | Ed Robertson | 4:34 |
| 11. | "Unfinished" | Hearn; Page; Robertson | Steven Page, Ed Robertson | 3:00 |
| 12. | "Second Best" | Hearn; Page; Robertson | Steven Page | 3:21 |
| 13. | "Take It Outside" | | Ed Robertson | 3:49 |
| 14. | "Have You Seen My Love?" | | Steven Page | 2:55 |

Limited Edition bonus tracks
| No. | Title | Writer(s) | Lead vocals | Length |
|---|---|---|---|---|
| 15. | "Another Postcard (acoustic)" | | Steven Page, Ed Robertson | 3:35 |
| 16. | "Maybe Katie (acoustic)" | Creeggan; Page; Robertson | Steven Page, Ed Robertson | 3:09 |
| 17. | "Second Best (acoustic)" | Hearn; Page; Robertson | Steven Page | 3:21 |

== Personnel ==
Barenaked Ladies

- Jim Creeggan – double bass and electric bass, string arrangements, vocals
- Kevin Hearn – piano, organ, keyboards, accordion, acoustic and electric guitars, mandolin, vibraphone, saw, vocals
- Steven Page – acoustic and electric guitars, vocals
- Ed Robertson – acoustic and electric guitar, vocals
- Tyler Stewart – drums and percussion, vocals

Additional personnel

- Blue Man Group (Chris Bowen, Matt Goldman, Brian Scott, Phil Stanton, Chris Wink) – PVC Tube percussion ("Shopping"
- Yvonne Gallegos – vocals
- Roberto "Tiny" Menegoni – tambourine ("Upside Down")
- Charlie Bisharat – violin
- Larry Corbett – cello
- Joel Derouin – violin
- Annabelle Hill – vocals
- Chris Wonzer – vocals

Technical personnel

- Ron Aniello – production; percussion, additional electric guitar, banjo
- Tim Oberthier – recording
- Clint Roth – recording
- Eric Sarafin – recording
- Ed Thacker – recording
- Mike Shipley – mixing; 5.1 mix
- Bob Ludwig – mastering
- Daniel Kresco – assistant engineer
- Brian Wohlgemuth – assistant engineer
- Chris Wonzer – assistant engineer
- Clint Roth – digital editing and "coolness"
- Chris Woods – cover painting
- Phil Mucci – photography and collage
- Stephen Walker – design
- Suzie Katayama – string contractor
