= Too Little Too Late (Barenaked Ladies song) =

2001 single by Barenaked Ladies

Single by Barenaked Ladies

from the album Maroon
- Released: January 16, 2001
- Length: 3:24
- Label: Reprise
- Songwriters: Steven Page; Ed Robertson
- Producer: Don Was

Barenaked Ladies singles chronology
"Pinch Me" (2000)	"Too Little Too Late" (2001)	"Falling for the First Time" (2001)

Music video
- "Too Little Too Late" on YouTube

"Too Little Too Late" is a song by Canadian rock band Barenaked Ladies from their fifth studio album, Maroon (2000). The song was written by Ed Robertson and Steven Page, and Page performed the lead vocals. The single includes a remix of another single from Maroon, "Pinch Me". Another version was also released as a "Special Enhanced CD Single" with album art work based on the song's music video. The song is also included on the band's 2001 compilation album, Disc One: All Their Greatest Hits.

== Music video ==
The music video, directed by Phil Harder, is about the stresses of making a music video, in which the director forces them to record and re-record the video several times. At the end of the video, the director calls for a cut, and asks to record it again, prompting Page to scream. The screaming is not actually Steven's voice. The actual video shoot was the band's longest, lasting three days. It was filmed in the middle of a string of radio station promotional appearances.

== Personnel ==
- Steven Page – lead vocals, handclaps
- Ed Robertson – acoustic and electric guitars, handclaps, backing vocals
- Jim Creeggan – electric bass, handclaps, backing vocals
- Kevin Hearn – clavinet, organ, sampler, handclaps, backing vocals
- Tyler Stewart – drums, tambourine, handclaps

== Charts ==
=== Weekly charts ===
Chart (2001)	Peak position
Canada Radio (BDS)	9
US Billboard Hot 100	86
US Adult Alternative Airplay (Billboard)	11
US Adult Pop Airplay (Billboard)	13
US Pop Airplay (Billboard)	40

=== Year-end charts ===
Chart (2001)	Position
Canada Radio (Nielsen BDS)	34
US Adult Top 40 (Billboard)	47

== Release history ==
Region	Date	Format(s)	Label(s)	Ref.
United States	January 16, 2001	Contemporary hit; hot adult contemporary; alternative radio	Reprise	
United Kingdom	April 2, 2001	CD; cassette	Reprise	
