= Kevin Hearn and Thin Buckle =

Canadian band

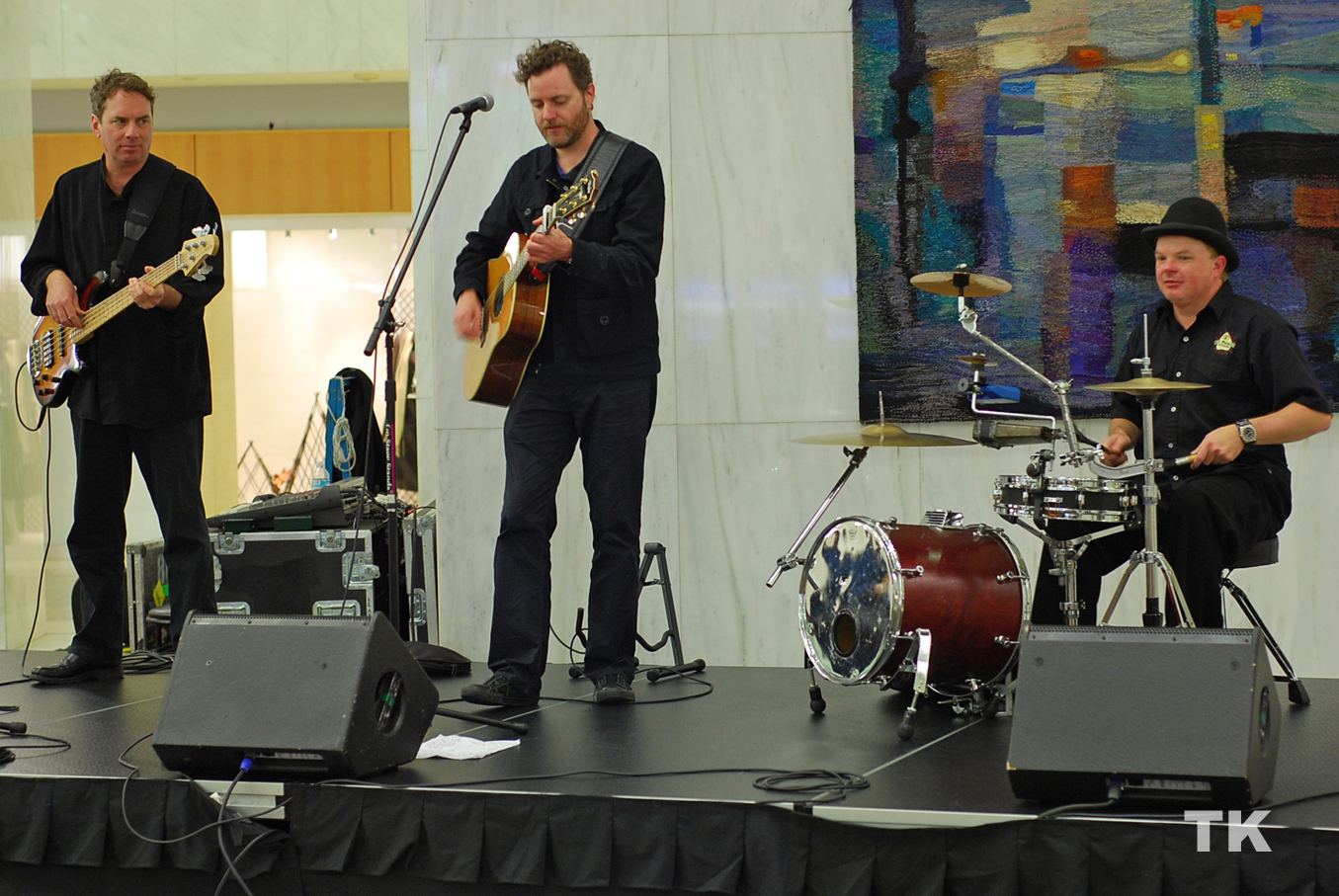
- Gartner, Hearn and Scott (l-r)

Background information
- Origin: Toronto, Ontario, Canada
- Years active: 2000–present
- Labels: Nettwerk, MapleMusic, Six Shooter
- Members: Kevin Hearn; Chris Gartner; Great Bob Scott; Brian MacMillan
- Past members: Derek Orford; Martin Tielli
- Website: kevinhearn.com

Kevin Hearn and Thin Buckle (originally Kevin Hearn and the Thin Buckle Band) are a Canadian band consisting of Barenaked Ladies multi-instrumentalist Kevin Hearn as the front man (typically on guitar or keyboards), bassist Chris Gartner, and drummer Great Bob Scott. The three had previously collaborated as members of the Canadian alternative rock band Look People.

Guitarists Martin Tielli and Derek Orford were originally members; the former left the band to pursue other musical interests in the early 2000s, while the latter left due to injury shortly after the release of Night Light in 2004 and never returned to the band other than as a guest performer on four tracks of The Miracle Mile. Brian MacMillan joined the group on guitar and keyboards after Night Light was released, effectively replacing Orford. MacMillan left the group to pursue his own career after the recording of Havana Winter. Mike Rathke is credited as a member of the band on guitar on that album, although he has never performed live with the group. Sheena Ko began performing with the band in 2010 on keyboards and vocals.

== History ==
Hearn's first solo album was 1997's Mothball Mint, which he was able to release with funds earned from touring with Barenaked Ladies since 1995. The album was a solo record, but featured Scott drumming on all tracks save for one live track culled from a Barenaked Ladies concert recorded for their live album Rock Spectacle. Gartner, Tielli and Orford all appear on the album, though not on a majority of the tracks.

The first album to be credited to "Kevin Hearn and Thin Buckle" was 2001's H-Wing, the songs for which were written by Hearn during his battle with chronic myelogenous leukemia, through 1998 and 1999. H-Wing, named for the wing in which he spent most of his initial month-long hospital admission, was recorded while he was still involved in fairly intensive medical follow-up, and was in and out of hospital with complications of his treatments.

Night Light was released in 2004, although copies were made available for purchase at Barenaked Ladies concerts in late 2003. This was followed by The Miracle Mile which was released in Canada in 2006. Hearn wrote the eleven songs on the album while spending time in Los Angeles. For the 2009 album, Havana Winter, high-profile collaborators included Lou Reed and Laurie Anderson.

The band has always had a sporadic live schedule, due in part to Hearn's touring commitments with Barenaked Ladies. Similarly, albums have often had wide gaps between recording and release (for example, Night Light was recorded in the summer of 2002, but not officially released until 2004). Their live performances are most commonly in the Toronto area, as the band members all reside in the city. Tours are infrequent, but have occurred; an example is a late-2004 tour through Canada, and the American northeast for which Hearn opened his own shows with his cousin Harland Williams playing material as the duo's album, "The Cousins". His shows are often informal, with any members of the band who are available joining Hearn, and others absent. Hearn plays solo sets within many shows. Musicians who are in the audience are often invited to perform as guests. Hearn's concerts typically include material from both his solo and Thin Buckle albums, songs he's written for Barenaked Ladies, and Hearn's songs from The Story of Harmelodia, as well as frequent covers of other artists.

== Discography ==
- H-Wing – 2001
- Night Light – 2004
- The Miracle Mile – 2006
- Havana Winter – 2009

=== Related albums ===
The following albums contain songs by Hearn that the band currently plays.

- Mothball Mint – 1997 (Hearn's debut solo album)
- The Story of Harmelodia – 1999 (Rheostatics release featuring Kevin Hearn)
- Cloud Maintenance – 2011 (Hearn's second solo album)
