= Misaki Kawai =

Japanese artist

Misaki Kawai (河井美咲) (born 1978 in Ōkawa, Kagawa, Japan) is a Japanese artist. Her work has been shown extensively in the United States. "Her father was an architect and amateur painter and her mother made clothing and puppets" Kawai creates installations out of paper-mâché, wood, fabric, and other low-tech, "crafty" materials like felt, stickers, and yarn. She shuns expertise and uses an anime method called heta-uma that "risks amateur aesthetics by embracing basic expression" Kawai artist books include Blueberry Express (Nieves Press, 2009), Pencil Exercise (Edition Nord, 2011), Steamy Buns (nos:books, 2020).

From December 2020 through April 2021, Kawai held her first installation in Australia, Moja Moja Land.
