= Falling for the First Time =

2001 single by Barenaked Ladies

Single by Barenaked Ladies

from the album Maroon
- Released: June 18, 2001
- Length: 3:40
- Label: Reprise
- Songwriters: Steven Page; Ed Robertson
- Producer: Don Was

Barenaked Ladies singles chronology
"Too Little Too Late" (2001)	"Falling for the First Time" (2001)	"Thanks That Was Fun" (2001)

Audio sample
- file; help

Music video
- "Falling for the First Time" on YouTube

"Falling for the First Time" is a song by Canadian rock band Barenaked Ladies from their fifth full-length studio album, Maroon (2000). The song was composed by Steven Page and Ed Robertson. The song also appears on the band's 2001 compilation album, Disc One: All Their Greatest Hits, and the soundtrack of the TV show Malcolm in the Middle. Following the terrorist attacks on September 11, 2001, the song was placed on the list of post-9/11 inappropriate titles distributed by Clear Channel.

== Critical reception ==
Rolling Stone magazine said that the single "strives to translate the emotional rush of falling in love into a swirling, shimmering wall of sound, with a nice detour for the earthbound observation, 'anyone perfect must be lying.'" Billboard said the song was "shimmering."

== Music video ==
The music video begins with a security guard at a museum (played by BNL's keyboardist Kevin Hearn's cousin Harland Williams) who is bored watching the camera monitors decides to change the channel to a TV station. The only channel to pop up shows the band playing the song, despite efforts by the guard to return the monitors to normal. Enraged the guard takes the camera monitor and tosses it into the garbage bin. As the guard returns to his desk the song has just ended, in the background the band can be seen leaving with several pieces of stolen artwork from the museum along with taking the monitor he just tossed, revealing that the video was used to distract the guard.

A shortened version exists that was made in conjunction with Kids' WB as part of their interstitial "Top Toons Tune". It uses the clip of the band playing from the original video, but mixes it with clips from the then current programming block's line up which included Static Shock, ¡Mucha Lucha!, Scooby-Doo, Where Are You!, Pokémon, Yu-Gi-Oh!, Jackie Chan Adventures, X-Men: Evolution and The Mummy.

== Personnel ==
- Ed Robertson – lead vocals, acoustic and electric guitars
- Steven Page – acoustic and electric guitars, backing vocals
- Jim Creeggan – electric bass, backing vocals
- Kevin Hearn – piano, synthesizer, backing vocals
- Tyler Stewart – drums, backing vocals
- Rob Menegoni – tambourine

== Charts ==
=== Weekly charts ===
Chart (2001)	Peak position
US Adult Pop Airplay (Billboard)	11

=== Year-end charts ===
Chart (2001)	Position
Canada Radio (Nielsen BDS)	75
US Adult Top 40 (Billboard)	39
