= Oh Chanukah =

Hanukkah song

"Oh Chanukah" played on xylophone and marimba

Oh Chanukah (also Chanukah, Oh Chanukah) is an English version of the Yiddish Oy Chanukah (Yiddish: חנוכּה אױ חנוכּה Khanike Oy Khanike). The English words, while not a translation, are roughly based on the Yiddish. "Oy Chanukah" is a traditional Yiddish Chanukah song. "Oh Chanukah" is a very popular modern English Chanukah song. This upbeat playful children's song has lines about dancing the Horah, playing with dreidels, eating latkes, lighting the candles, and singing happy songs. The song was written by Mordkhe (Mark) Rivesman, and first published in Susman Kiselgof's 1912 Lider-Zamlbukh [Song anthology].

== Naming ==
According to the Freedman Jewish Music Archive at the University of Pennsylvania Library, alternate names the Yiddish version of song has been recorded under include "Khanike Days", "Khanike Khag Yafe", "Khanike Li Yesh", "Latke Song (Khanike Oy Khanike)", "Yemi Khanike", and "Chanike Oy Chanike". 'Chanukah' is and was sometimes written as 'Khanike' as that was the standard transliteration from Yiddish according to the YIVO system.

== Versions ==
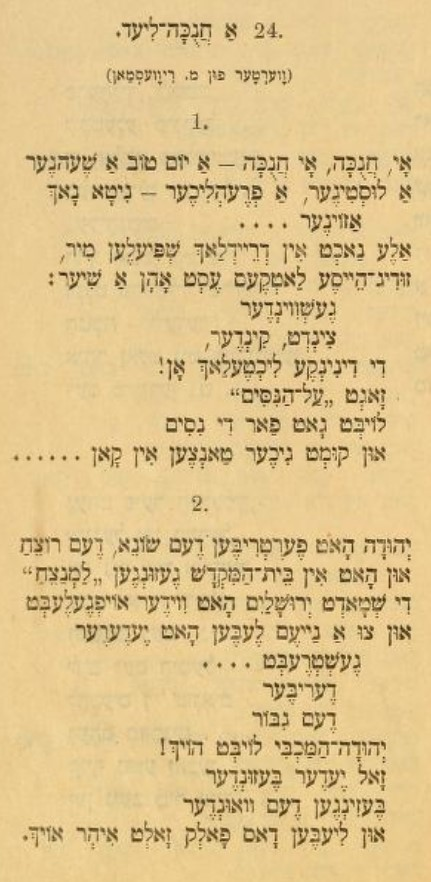
The original Yiddish lyrics, in Hebrew lettering, as published in 1912

English version
Yiddish version
Yiddish transliteration
Yiddish literal translation

(Oh), Hanukkah, Oh Hanukkah
Come light the menorah
Let's have a party
We'll all dance the horah
Gather 'round the table, we'll give you a treat
Dreidels (Note: or "sevivon") to play with, and latkes (Note: or "levivot") to eat

חנוכה אוי חנוכה
אַ יום-טוב אַ שיינער
אַ לוסטיקער אַ פריילעכער
נישט דאָ נאָך אַזוינער
אַלע נאַכט מיט דריידלעך שפילן מיר,
פרישע הייסע לאַטקעס, עסן אָן אַ שיעור.

(Oy), Khanike oy Khanike
A yontef a sheyner,
A lustiker a freylekher
Nisht do nokh azoyner
Ale nakht mit dreydlekh shpiln mir,
Frishe heyse latkes, esn on a shir.

(Oh), Chanukah, Oh Chanukah
A beautiful celebration.
Such a cheerful and happy one,
There is none like it.
Every night with the dreidels we will play,
Fresh, hot latkes we will eat endlessly.

And while we are playing
The candles are burning bright (Note: or low)
One for each night, they shed a sweet light
To remind us of years (Note: or days) long ago
One for each night, they shed a sweet light
To remind us of years (Note: or days) long ago.

געשווינדער, צינדט קינדער
די חנוכה ליכטלעך אָן,
זאָגט על-הניסים, לויבט גאָט פאַר די נסים,
און לאָמיר אַלע טאַנצען אין קאָן.
זאָגט על-הניסים, לויבט גאָט פאַר די נסים,
און לאָמיר אַלע טאַנצען אין קאָן.

Geshvinder, tsindt kinder
Di Khanike likhtlekh on,
Zogt "Al Hanisim", loybt Got far di nisim,
Un lomir ale tantsn in kon.
Zogt "Al Hanisim", loybt Got far di nisim,
Un lomir ale tantsn in kon.

Come quickly children
Light the Chanukah candles
Say "Al HaNissim", praise God for the miracles,
And we will all dance together in a circle!
Say "Al HaNissim", praise God for the miracles,
And we will all dance together in a circle!

== Alternate Yiddish versions and pronunciations ==
A very common Yiddish version of the song is below with alternate words, lines, verses, or pronunciations on the right. This version follows the original published version rather than the more popular variant given above. The bolded words are what is changed. The "(x2)" in the bottom left indicated that part is repeated.

A common version			Alternate words	Alternate pronunciations (see Yiddish regional dialects)
	**Oy** Chanukah, Oy Chanukah a yontif a sheyner,			Sometimes the first "Oy" is omitted, which it also is sometimes done in English versions.
	A lustiker; a freylekher; **nisht do** nokh **azeyner**.		A lustiker; a freylikher; **nito** nokh **azoyner**.	"Azeyner" is sometimes pronounced "azoyner," esp. in standard Yiddish. "Nisht do" and "nito" are dialectal variants.
	Ale nakht **in** dreydlekh,		Ale nakht **mit** dreydlekh,	Dialectical variant.
	Shpiln mir, **frishe** heyse latkes, **esn** on a shir.		Shpiln mir, **zudik** heyse latkes, esn on a shir.	"Zudik" means "boiling hot".
	Shpiln mir, **frishe** heyse latkes, **esn** on a shir.		Shpiln mir, frishe heyse latkes, **est** on a shir.	"Est" is the imperative form.
	Geshvinder, **tsindt kinder** Di **Chanukah** likhtlekh **on**,		Geshvinder, tsindt kinder, Di **dininke** likhtlekh on,	
	Geshvinder, **tsindt kinder** Di **Chanukah** likhtlekh **on**,		**Kumt kinder**, geshvinder, Di Chanukah likhtlekh **veln mir ontsindn**,	Syntactic rearrangement.
Alternate verses				
(x2)	**Zingt** "Al Hanisim",	Zol yeder bazunder Bazingen dem vunder Un tantsen freylekh in kon.	**Mir zingen** "Al Hanisim"	
(x2)	**Un danken** far di nisim,	Zol yeder bazunder Bazingen dem vunder Un tantsen freylekh in kon.	**Mir danken far di nisim**,	
(x2)	**Un danken** far di nisim,	Zol yeder bazunder Bazingen dem vunder Un tantsen freylekh in kon.	**Tantsen** far di nisim	
(x2)	**Un kumt gikher** tantsen **in kohn**.	Zol yeder bazunder Bazingen dem vunder Un tantsen freylekh in kon.	**Lomir ale** tantsen **tsuzamen**.	

== Hebrew version ==
There is also a Hebrew version (ימי החנוכה), which has the same melody, its words penned by Avraham Avronin. The words correspond roughly to the original (more so than the English version), with slight variations for rhyme and rhythm's sake, to match the Sephardic pronunciation which serves as the basis for Modern Standard Hebrew. Thus the first line names the holiday; the second calls for joy and happiness (using two synonyms); in the third the speakers say they will spin dreidels all night; in the fourth they will eat latkes (note that sufganiyot (סופגניות) could also mean latkes in early Modern-Hebrew); in the fifth the speaker calls everyone to light the Chanukah candles; the sixth mentions the prayer Al Hanissim, "On the miracles". The only big change is in the last line – whereas the original calls to praise God for the miracles he performed, the Hebrew one praises the miracles and wonders performed by the Maccabees. This reflects the anti-religious polemic of early Zionism, evident in many other Israeli Chanukah songs. Dati Leumi Jews sing an altered version of the line which includes a call to praise God.

In Israel, it is still a very popular song, but since the country has a rich inventory of Chanukah songs it is not as exclusively popular as the English version in English speaking countries, or the Yiddish version in the past.

Hebrew text	Hebrew transliteration	Hebrew literal translation	English version
יְמֵי הַחֲנֻכָּה	Y'mey haChanukah	The days of Chanukah	(Oh), Chanukah, Oh Chanukah
חֲנֻכַּת מִקְדָּשֵׁנוּ	Chanukat mikdasheinu,	The Rededication of our Sanctuary	Come light the menorah
בְּגִיל וּבְשִׂמְחָה	B'gil uv'simcha	With joy and happiness	Let's have a party
מְמַלְּאִים אֶת לִבֵּנוּ	M'mal'im et libeinu.	We fill our hearts.	We'll all dance the horah
לַיְלָה וָיוֹם סְבִיבוֹנֵנוּ יִסֹּב	Layla vayom, S'vivoneinu yisov,	Night and day, our top (dreidel / s'vivon) turns	Gather round the table, we'll give you a treat
סֻפְגָּנִיּוֹת נֹאכַל בָּם לָרֹב	Sufganiot, Nochal bam larov!	Jelly doughnuts (sufganiot), we'll also eat many.	Dreidels (or Sevivon) to play with, and latkes to eat
הָאִירוּ, הַדְלִיקוּ	Ha'iru, hadliku,	Light 'em, ignite 'em	And while we are playing
נֵרוֹת חֲנֻכָּה רַבִּים	Nerot Chanukah rabbim.	The many candles of Chanukah.	The candles are burning bright (or low)
עַל הַנִּסִּים וְעַל הַנִּפְלָאוֹת	Al hanissim, v'al haniflaot	For the miracles, And for the wonders	One for each night, they shed a sweet light
אֲשֶׁר חוֹלְלוּ הַמַּכַּבִּים	asher chollelu haMakabim.	Which the Maccabees accomplished.	To remind us of days long ago
עַל הַנִּסִּים וְעַל הַנִּפְלָאוֹת	Al hanissim, v'al haniflaot	For the miracles, And for the wonders	One for each night, they shed a sweet light
אֲשֶׁר חוֹלְלוּ הַמַּכַּבִּים	asher chollelu haMakabim.	Which the Maccabees accomplished.	To remind us of days long ago

== See also ==
- Hanukkah music
- Passover songs
- Christmas music
- Ma'oz Tzur, liturgical poem recited at Hanukkah
