= Maroon (Barenaked Ladies album) =

Studio album by Barenaked Ladies
- Released: September 12, 2000
- Recorded: April–June 2000
- Genre: Alternative rock
- Length: 52:09
- Label: Reprise
- Producer: Don Was

Barenaked Ladies chronology
Stunt (1998)	Maroon (2000)	Disc One: All Their Greatest Hits (1991–2001) (2001)

Singles from Maroon
- 1. "Pinch Me" Released: August 7, 2000; 2. "Too Little Too Late" Released: March 20, 2001; 3. "Falling for the First Time" Released: May 21, 2001

Professional ratings
Aggregate scores
Source	Rating
Metacritic	59/100
Review scores
Source	Rating
AllMusic	3/5 stars
Encyclopedia of Popular Music	2/5 stars
Entertainment.ie	3/5 stars
Entertainment Weekly	A−
The Guardian	2/5 stars
Now	3/5 stars
Q	3/5 stars
Rolling Stone	3.5/5 stars
The Rolling Stone Album Guide	2.5/5 stars
Spin	3/10

Maroon is the fifth full-length studio album by Barenaked Ladies. The album was the follow-up to 1998's Stunt, the band's most successful album in the United States. Maroon debuted at No. 1 in Canada (their second to reach No. 1 after their 1992 debut Gordon) and No. 5 on the U.S. Billboard 200. In its first week, the album sold 17,800 copies in Canada and just under 128,000 in the US. It has sold at least 1 million copies in the US alone. The album spawned three hit singles: "Pinch Me", "Too Little Too Late" and "Falling for the First Time".

Unlike past albums, the songs came almost entirely from the pairing of Page/Robertson. One track, "Baby Seat", was written by Page with longtime songwriting partner, Stephen Duffy. This was the last Page/Duffy track that Barenaked Ladies would release, starting a policy of keeping the writing within the band on their next album. "Hidden Sun", written while Hearn was in the hospital, appears as a hidden track on most copies of the album. As with each of their early albums, the band recorded one song, "Humour of the Situation", completely naked.

The band recorded 17 tracks for the album; Tracks recorded for this album but omitted from the finished record include: "Powder Blue" (appears on the US "Pinch Me" single), "Inline Bowline" (appears as an extra track on some international versions, and is on the Australian "Pinch Me" single), "Born Human" (appears on the Australian "Pinch Me" single, re-recorded for Hearn's album Night Light) and "Half a Heart" (re-recorded for the Barenaked Ladies Are Me sessions before the Maroon sessions version was later released on Stop Us If You've Heard This One Before!). "That's All, That's All" was also written for the album, and was later recorded for Page's The Vanity Project.

The album was the first Barenaked Ladies album released on DVD-Audio in a 5.1 surround sound mix. In 2020, a 20th Anniversary Edition was released digitally, and was announced for a vinyl release in early 2021. The 20th Anniversary Edition includes contains the three contemporary B-sides recorded for the album (not including "Half a Heart") as well as a demo version of "Falling for the First Time", and a previously unreleased "alternate" version of "Green Christmas". Also, "Hidden Sun" is separated into its own track.

== Track listing ==
All tracks are written by Steven Page and Ed Robertson, except where noted.

No.	Title	Writer(s)	Lead vocals	Length
1.	"Too Little Too Late"		Steven Page	3:24
2.	"Never Do Anything"		Steven Page	3:51
3.	"Pinch Me"		Ed Robertson	4:45
4.	"Go Home"		Steven Page; Ed Robertson	2:43
5.	"Falling for the First Time"		Ed Robertson	3:40
6.	"Conventioneers"		Steven Page	3:43
7.	"Sell, Sell, Sell"		Steven Page	4:01
8.	"The Humour of the Situation"		Steven Page	3:45
9.	"Baby Seat"	Page; Stephen Duffy	Steven Page	4:13
10.	"Off the Hook"		Steven Page	4:34
11.	"Helicopters"		Steven Page	4:33
12.	"Tonight Is the Night I Fell Asleep at the Wheel"		Steven Page	3:48
13.	"Hidden Sun" (hidden track)	Kevin Hearn	Kevin Hearn	5:01

== Personnel ==
=== Barenaked Ladies ===
- Jim Creeggan – electric bass (1, 2, 3, 5, 8, 9, 10, 11), background vocals (1, 4, 5, 6, 9, 11, 12), handclaps (1, 4), violin (3, 11), viola (3, 7, 11, 12), baritone guitar (4), glockenspiel (4), electric double bass (6, 12), double bass (4, 6, 7, 11), arco double bass (12)
- Kevin Hearn – organ (1, 2, 3, 8, 9), synthesizer (5, 6, 10, 12), piano (2, 5, 6, 8, 9, 10), accordion (2), glockenspiel (7), electric piano (3, 4), background vocals (1, 5, 6, 7, 9, 12), clavinet (1, 2), handclaps (1), sampling (1, 2, 7, 9, 12), baritone guitar (7), vocoder (8), electric guitar (11), keyboards (7, 11), melodica (11), lead vocals (13)
- Steven Page – lead vocals (1, 2, 4, 6, 7, 8, 9, 10, 11, 12), background vocals (1, 3, 5, 6), electric guitars (all), acoustic guitar (11), flute (12), recorder (11)
- Ed Robertson – lead vocals (3, 5), background vocals (1, 2, 4, 6, 7, 8, 9, 10, 11, 12), acoustic guitar (1, 3, 4, 5, 6, 7, 8), electric guitar (all), tambourine (10), 12-string guitar (11), handclaps (1, 4), wah-wah guitar (6), cabasa (10), mandolin (11), banjo (12)
- Tyler Stewart – castanets (7), drums (1, 2, 3, 4, 5, 6, 7, 8, 9, 11), tambourine (1, 4, 6, 7, 8, 9, 11), bells (11), handclaps (1), timpani (7, 12), cowbell (6), wah wah shaker (6), background vocals (4, 5), 808 drums (10), drum kit (10), shaker (11), snare drum (12), cymbal (12)

=== Additional personnel ===
- Jim Scott – vocals
- Roberto "Tiny" Menegoni – percussion
- Party in Studio 3 – Sweet Pea Atkinson, Jane Oppenheimer, Jen Hilliard, and Jim Scott (track 2)
- Sean Cullen and the male cast of "Shave It" (track 7)
- Major Scale courtesy of Chris Brown (track 9)
- Jono Abrams – Faxed thumbs-up (track 12)

=== Production ===
- Don Was – producer
- Jim Scott – engineer
- Jen Hiller – assistant engineer
- Katy Teasdale – assistant engineer
- Michael Scotella – additional engineer
- Brian Gardner – mastering

== Charts ==
=== Weekly charts ===
Chart (2000)	Peak position
Canadian Albums (Billboard)	2
Scottish Albums (OCC)	37
UK Albums (OCC)	64
US Billboard 200	5

=== Year-end charts ===
Chart (2000)	Position
Canadian Albums (Nielsen SoundScan)	67
US Billboard 200	180
Chart (2001)	Position
US Billboard 200	194

=== Singles ===
Year	Single	Chart	Position
2000	"Pinch Me"	Adult Top 40	2
2000	"Pinch Me"	Modern Rock Tracks	30
2000	"Pinch Me"	Billboard Hot 100	15
2000	"Pinch Me"	Top 40 Mainstream	17
2000	"Pinch Me"	Top 40 Tracks	11
2001	"Falling for the First Time"	Adult Top 40	11
2001	"Pinch Me"	Top 40 Adult Recurrents	1
2001	"Too Little Too Late"	Adult Top 40	13
2001	"Too Little Too Late"	Billboard Hot 100	86
2001	"Too Little Too Late"	Top 40 Mainstream	40

== Certifications ==
Region	Certification	Certified units/sales
Canada (Music Canada)	Platinum	100,000^{^}
United States (RIAA)	Platinum	1,000,000^{^}
^{^} Shipments figures based on certification alone.
