= Barenaked Ladies Are Me =

Studio album by Barenaked Ladies
- Released: September 12, 2006
- Recorded: October 17–November 20, 2005 (Beds); February 5–April 28, 2006 (Overdubs); May 2006 (Mixing) at Metalworks Studios in Mississauga, Ontario
- Genre: Alternative rock
- Length: 48:47
- Label: Desperation
- Producer: Barenaked Ladies

Barenaked Ladies chronology
| As You Like It (2005) | Barenaked Ladies Are Me (2006) | Extended Versions (2006) |

Barenaked Ladies Are Me is the seventh full-length original-material studio album by Barenaked Ladies. It was their first original-material album since Everything to Everyone in 2003. It was released in September 2006 internationally. The album was also the first full-length original-material album from the band following their decision to become independent rather than re-sign with Reprise. The cover art was created by a group of artists called Team Macho. The name has been cited by the band as a double entendre for "Barenaked Ladies Army".

Due to the diversity and wealth of content recorded for the album, the release of the material from the Are Me sessions became more complicated than for earlier albums. The band recorded 29 songs during the sessions but the primary physical release of Barenaked Ladies Are Me is a 13-track CD. Five months after the release of Are Me, a second primary physical album, Barenaked Ladies Are Men, was released, and included the remaining 16 songs from the same sessions. However, the line between these two releases was blurred by a series of additional releases which included songs from both releases in a variety of groupings. Thus, the entire 29-song collection could be considered the band's seventh full-length original-material studio album in its own right, or as both its seventh and eighth, taking Are Me and Are Men separately.

== Writing ==
Reflecting their new independence, the album saw changes in the creative process of the Barenaked Ladies. The band began 2005 with several songs already written, many of which were performed, recorded, and released on the 2004 summer Au Naturale tour (see below for details). In spring 2005, Ed Robertson and Steven Page got together at Page's home and began writing the first songs specifically intended for this album. They met again at Robertson's cottage after the summer and wrote 13–15 more songs. Kevin Hearn was also busy writing songs at his own cabin, where he completed several songs for this album, as well as a large portion of his own album The Miracle Mile. Additionally, Jim Creeggan managed to complete a two-year-old idea into the song "Peterborough and the Kawarthas". The content provided by the latter two members continued the practice started on Everything to Everyone of including writing from band members other than Page and Robertson, and not taking in writing from outside the band.

The band gathered the more than 30 songs (far more than any past album) at a rehearsal hall in Toronto, to learn and arrange the songs. They intended to record as many beds (initial recordings, used to record the final track over) as possible, and ultimately recorded 29 beds in fall 2005 (they decided to leave several songs which were previously recorded off in order to potentially use the prior recordings on an upcoming boxed set). The band also noted that there was no "naked track" (a song recorded with all the band members naked, started on Gordon with "King of Bedside Manor") for this album, saying that it had gotten old.

The band set out after the bed-recording session at Steven Page's farmhouse studio, Fresh Baked Woods, for their perennial Barenaked for the Holidays tour. They returned to the studio in February 2006 and recorded their overdubs during April. In May, they began mixing the album at Mississauga's Metalworks Studios with mixer Bob Clearmountain while still finishing the last overdubs.

== Touring and recording ==
In summer 2004, the band continued to build upon the setlist variations they began on the Peepshow tour. The band decided to play one song at every show that they had never played before, or had not played in many years. Among these songs were unreleased B-sides, and newly written songs, including seven that became part of the 29-song BLAM sessions ("Adrift", "Bull in a China Shop", "Beautiful", "I Can, I Will, I Do", "What a Letdown", "Take it Back", and "Half a Heart").

The band took a break from the unheard songs on their 2004 Holidays tour, but on the 22-show 2005 Holidays tour, after emerging from the first studio session, they played a song from the BLAM session at every show. The first five songs listed above from the Au Naturale tour were repeated, while 17 other new songs were played. The only songs unheard (in entirety) after that tour were "One and Only", "Vanishing" (originally titled "Magician"), "Running Out of Ink", "Maybe Not" and "Serendipity". "Running out of Ink" was subsequently performed solo by Steve at a fundraising show in Toronto on May 8, 2006, and later at the All New Revue (see below). "Vanishing" was also played at the All New Revue. The other songs were not publicly played until the release of the album. In 2010, departed member Steven Page recorded a new arrangement of "Running Out Of Ink" with the Art of Time Ensemble for their collaborative album A Singer Must Die.

The band also took the opportunity in the studio to record three of their songs ("Easy", "Wind It Up" and "What A Letdown") in 'Simlish' (a gibberish language used in the Sim series of video games by Maxis) and were released in the Sims 2 "Family Fun Stuff" expansion pack. These were the first fully released (several clips have/had been played on podcasts) studio tracks from the album; though the mixing was not the final album mixing and the vocals were replaced.

On May 26, 2006, the album release dates were announced, along with the revelation of "Easy" as the leadoff single for late June (the announcement came from the band's German management and was subsequently confirmed by the band's North American official websites). On June 6, the band announced the album title, along with a remix contest.

On June 19, iTunes released a three-track single for the song "Easy", which also included "Wind It Up" and the version of "Home" from the All New Revue. This was the first release of any complete final tracks from Barenaked Ladies Are Me. The single was also available on eMusic, marking the band's first release on the service.

On August 17, iTunes accidentally released the standard edition of the album plus the four associated bonus tracks on some of their music stores. For just over twelve hours, the album was available to buy in single track form (for all 17 tracks) or as an album before the mistake was corrected. On September 2, the same occurred for the 29-track presale deluxe edition, which was available for two and a half days.

== All New Revue ==
On May 19, 2006, the band performed an intimate acoustic performance at Toronto's 341-seat Glenn Gould Studio in the Canadian Broadcasting Centre. The band initially announced plans to play all 29 new songs at the show (they were still mixing at the time). However, the plan was revised shortly before the show when the band decided that 29 songs would not be feasible and ultimately decided on a final list of songs for the physical CD album. They played only 15 songs, explaining that approximately 12–14 of those songs would be the songs making up the initial physical release. The show was audio and video recorded and an audio CD of the 13 songs which ultimately became the primary album was a pre-order bonus and later available on iTunes. The video has not currently been used. The CBC apparently has their own access to the audio recording of the show, as they played a differently ordered, differently mixed version of the show during a radio interview on Definitely Not the Opera with Page in early September.

== Remix contest ==
On June 6, the band announced a contest for their fans. They plan to release five songs from the album in the form of separate instrument tracks for the purpose of remixing. The first song released was "Easy"; the second, released on July 13, was "Wind It Up"; the third, released on August 16, was "Bank Job"; the fourth, released on September 2, was "Rule the World with Love"; "I Can I Will I Do" rounded off the five songs. On September 27, the band released a sixth song for remixing, "Maybe You're Right".

The main releases, available through the band's download site and werkshop.com, contained each track from the song's mix. Shortly after their respective releases, the songs were available to download split into four mp3 tracks on the band's Myspace.com page. Each file grouped similar tracks, such as all the vocals, or all the guitars, in order to divide the songs tracks four ways. "Wind It Up"'s Myspace split lacked some of the song's elements including guitar solo and keyboard tracks.

Fans were able to submit remixes of each song, which the band ultimately selected for inclusion on a special EP, whose proceeds will go to charity. Though discussed in March 2007 on an interview with University Radio York, no plans for this release were ever announced; with the band's 2009 departure from Nettwerk Management, it is unlikely that it ever will be.

== Reception ==
Professional ratings
Review scores
| Source | Rating |
|---|---|
| Allmusic | 3.5/5 stars |
| BlogCritics | 3/5 stars |
| Encyclopedia of Popular Music | 3/5 stars |
| IGN | 8.1/10 |
| Popmatters | 6/10 stars |
| Rolling Stone | 2.5/5 stars |
| Slant | 2.5/5 stars |

Barenaked Ladies Are Me reached No. 17 on the US Billboard 200 chart and No. 7 in Canada.

== Release versions ==
The band was not sure how to release so much material, initially opposing suggestions of a double album citing both cost and a potential overload of too much music. They indicated a likely plan to release a normal-length album and to save other songs for future shorter EP releases. The band, however, ultimately settled on a 13-track physical album, with a second physical album entitled Barenaked Ladies Are Men. The latter album was originally pre-released exclusively in Canadian Starbucks locations on October 3, 2006. This version of Are Men contained 12 of the remaining tracks, plus Are Me's two singles. The four songs not included on either of those releases were deemed as digital-download "bonus tracks" and it was implied that they were not going to be made available physically. This was consistent with the "Deluxe Edition" of the Are Me album, which compiled the 25 tracks into a two-disc package that excluded the "bonus tracks". However, when Are Men officially received widespread release on February 6, 2007, it contained all 16 tracks not on Are Me, including the "bonus tracks"; this track list was not announced until shortly before Are Men's release.

A bonus All New Revue CD was offered to fans if they preordered the Are Me album. The CD contained the same 13 songs as the basic Are Me album performed live and acoustic at the Glenn Gould Theatre in Toronto. A 5.1 surround sound deluxe edition of all 29 songs was released in the US on December 12, 2006, and alongside Are Men in Canada on February 6, 2007. Fans were offered several additional format and content options for purchasing the Are Me session material.

The following is a list of all release versions of the Are Me sessions material:

=== Physical discs ===
- 13-track Barenaked Ladies Are Me (primary album, in CD format, or as a 2-LP vinyl set)
- 16-track Barenaked Ladies Are Men (primary album, containing the 16 remaining tracks)
- 14-track Barenaked Ladies Are Men Starbucks exclusive pre-release
- 25-track Barenaked Ladies Are Me deluxe edition (2-CD version containing both albums without the four "bonus tracks")
- 29-track Barenaked Ladies Are Me deluxe edition 5.1 (DVD-Audio)

=== Digital versions ===
Two versions of the album were available for digital download at Are Me's initial release. The releases are equivalent to the Are Me 13-track primary album and the 25-track deluxe edition, both with the addition of two of the "bonus tracks" for a 15- and 27- track digital download release respectively. Each of these releases initially added the two remaining "bonus tracks" if the buyer pre-ordered. The download editions are available at various online digital music retailers. The bonus tracks were announced as only available through a whole-album purchase, but different retailers are inconsistent on this issue. The deluxe edition was also not to be buyable as individual tracks, but that decision was apparently reversed. Coinciding with physical release, the 16-track Are Men became available online, allowing purchase of all remaining songs.

- 13-track Barenaked Ladies Are Me download +2 bonus tracks if buying the whole album (see above).
- 25-track Barenaked Ladies Are Me deluxe edition +2 bonus tracks if buying the whole album (see above).
- 16-track Barenaked Ladies Are Men
- Barenaked Ladies Are USB – A USB stick sold at shows and at werkshop.com containing (in variable bit rate mp3 format):
  - 29 studio tracks
  - 4 live tracks from the All New Revue
  - "Easy" (studio acoustic version)
  - 5 Adlibs
  - 2 video tracks (studio home video)
  - 2 promo photos ("dog shot" and "diner shot")
  - 5 IM Icons

== Track listing ==
Tracks 1–13 are the physical Barenaked Ladies Are Me album; tracks 1–25 make up the physical deluxe edition. Tracks 26–27 were added to both versions for online download purchases. Tracks 28–29 were added to downloads on iTunes for those who pre-ordered. Tracks 14–29 were released as Barenaked Ladies are Men.

| Track # | Song | Composer(s) | Length | Lead singer | Notes |
|---|---|---|---|---|---|
| 1 | "Adrift" | Hearn, Page, Robertson | 3:35 | Ed Robertson | Originally recorded for Everything to Everyone, rearranged for a slower/mellower rhythm. |
| 2 | "Bank Job" | Page, Robertson | 4:27 | Ed Robertson | |
| 3 | "Sound of Your Voice" | Hearn | 3:16 | Steven Page | Originally sung by composer Hearn, but passed to Page |
| 4 | "Easy" | Page, Robertson | 4:31 | Ed Robertson | |
| 5 | "Home" | Page, Robertson | 3:34 | Steven Page | Completed at the spring 2005 writing session |
| 6 | "Bull in a China Shop" | Page, Robertson | 3:24 | Steven Page | Supposedly written after Everything to Everyone, but frequently played by Steven solo and by the band. |
| 7 | "Everything Had Changed" | Creeggan, Page, Robertson | 3:22 | Steven Page | |
| 8 | "Peterborough and the Kawarthas" | Creeggan | 2:40 | Jim Creeggan | |
| 9 | "Maybe You're Right" | Page, Robertson | 4:26 | Steven Page (with Ed Robertson) | |
| 10 | "Take It Back" | Page, Robertson | 4:00 | Ed Robertson | |
| 11 | "Vanishing" | Hearn | 3:14 | Kevin Hearn | Originally called "Magician" |
| 12 | "Rule the World with Love" | Page, Robertson | 3:52 | Steven Page | Completed at the spring 2005 writing session. |
| 13 | "Wind It Up" | Page, Robertson | 4:26 | Ed Robertson | Completed at the spring 2005 writing session; guitar solo by Kim Mitchell. |
| 14 | "Serendipity" | Hearn | 4:11 | Kevin Hearn | |
| 15 | "Something You'll Never Find" | Page, Robertson | 4:57 | Steven Page | |
| 16 | "One and Only" | Robertson | 3:47 | Ed Robertson | |
| 17 | "Angry People" | Page, Robertson | 4:02 | Steven Page | |
| 18 | "Down to Earth" | Page, Robertson | 3:46 | Ed Robertson | |
| 19 | "Beautiful" | Page, Robertson | 2:35 | Ed Robertson (with Steven Page) | |
| 20 | "Running Out of Ink" | Page, Robertson | 3:58 | Steven Page | |
| 21 | "Half a Heart" | Page, Robertson | 4:27 | Ed Robertson | Originally recorded for Maroon |
| 22 | "Maybe Not" | Page, Robertson | 3:00 | Ed Robertson | |
| 23 | "I Can I Will I Do" | Page, Robertson | 3:08 | Steven Page | Originally recorded for both Disc One: All Their Greatest Hits (1991–2001) and Everything To Everyone |
| 24 | "Fun and Games" | Page, Robertson | 3:45 | Ed Robertson | |
| 25 | "The New Sad" | Page, Robertson | 2:34 | Steven Page | Completed at the post-summer 2005 writing session. |
| 26 | "Quality"^{+} | Page, Robertson | 4:21 | Ed Robertson | Ends with six seconds of faint drumming, rewinded singing and light tenutos, accompanied by a three-noted bass guitar tune, followed by a high scream. On the BLAM deluxe edition, these seconds are replaced by silence. |
| 27 | "Another Spin" | Hearn | 4:05 | Kevin Hearn | Bonus for buying entire album (on standard and deluxe editions). |
| 28 | "What a Letdown" | Robertson | 3:49 | Ed Robertson | Pre-order only bonus (on both standard and deluxe editions – currently iTunes and USB only). Downloads from iTunes and at least some other stores, include an interactive QuickTime movie file which contains the album art, lyrics and credits called the "interactive booklet". |
| 29 | "Why Say Anything Nice?"^{‡} | Page, Robertson, Stewart | 3:42 | Steven Page | Pre-order only bonus (on both standard and deluxe editions – currently iTunes and USB only). Downloads from iTunes and at least some other stores, include an interactive QuickTime movie file which contains the album art, lyrics and credits called the "interactive booklet". |

== Personnel ==
Barenaked Ladies

- Steven Page – lead (3, 5, 6, 7, 12; co-lead on "Maybe You're Right") and background (2, 4, 8, 10, 13) vocals, baritone (9), electric (1–4, 8–12) and acoustic (on "Bull in a China Shop") guitars, finger snaps (7)
- Ed Robertson – lead (1, 2, 4, 10, 13; co-lead on "Maybe You're Right") and background (3, 5, 6, 7, 8, 11, 12, 13) vocals, acoustic (2, 4, 5, 6, 8, 9, 10, 12, 13) and electric (3, 6, 11, 13) guitars, banjo (1, 2, 7), electric bass (on "Easy", bridge part)
- Jim Creeggan – lead vocal (on "Peterborough and the Kawarthas"), arco bass (5, 9), cello (1, 7, 9), double bass (2, 3, 11), electric bass (4, 5, 6, 8, 9, 10, 13), electric guitar (12), viola (1, 12), violin (12), background vocals (1–7, 9, 10, 12)
- Tyler Stewart – drums (all but 7), finger snaps (7), percussion (all but 3), background vocals (on "Sound of Your Voice")
- Kevin Hearn – lead vocal (on "Vanishing"), keyboards (5, 10), piano (1, 2, 3, 8, 10, 12), acoustic guitar (1, 11), clavinet (4, 13), electric guitar (3), E-Bow (9), Fender Rhodes (on "Wind It Up"), mandolin (5), mellotron (1), organ (2, 6), slide guitar (5), synthesizer (2, 3, 4, 6, 8, 9, 12), toy piano (8), background vocals (1–9, 12, 13)

Additional musicians

- Rob Carli – tenor saxophone (on "Bull in a China Shop")
- Terry Promane – trombone (on "Bull in a China Shop" and "Maybe You're Right)
- Kevin Turcotte – trumpet (on "Bull in a China Shop" and "Maybe You're Right")
- Roberto Menegoni – cymbal roll (on "Everything Had Changed")
- Capella Sherwood – viola, violin (on "Maybe You're Right")
- Kim Mitchell – electric guitar, soloist (on "Wind It Up")

Production

- Barenaked Ladies – production
- Paul Forgues – recording (at Fresh Baked Woods; additional recording at Metalworks)
- Susan Rogers – recording (at Fresh Baked Woods)
- Jim Creeggan – recording (additional strings at his house)
- Kevin Hearn – additional recording (at Fresh Baked Woods)
- Keith Rudyk – additional recording (at Fresh Baked Woods), assistant (at Fresh Baked Woods)
- Bob Ludwig – mastering
- Bob Clearmountain – mixing

== Singles ==
Single information
"Easy"
- Released: 2006
- Formats: Digital download
"Wind It Up"
- Released: 2006
- Formats: CD
"Sound of Your Voice"
- Released: 2006
- Formats: CD

- "Easy" was the last successful single with Steven Page, reaching No. 1 on the Canadian adult contemporary chart.
