= Night Light (Kevin Hearn and Thin Buckle album) =

Studio album by Kevin Hearn and Thin Buckle
- Released: September 3, 2004
- Producer: Walter Zweifel

Kevin Hearn and Thin Buckle chronology
H-Wing (2001)	Night Light (2004)	The Miracle Mile (2006)

Night Light is the second album by Kevin Hearn and Thin Buckle. The band recorded it as a quartet, Tielli having left the band prior. It was produced by Walter Zweifel. It was sold at Barenaked Ladies concerts in late 2003, but wasn't officially released until 2004. The album features Garth Hudson of The Band on organ and accordion.

Night Light is a more upbeat album than the band's previous release, H-Wing, which was written largely while Hearn was in the hospital receiving treatment for leukemia. By the time he began to write and record Night Light, the disease was in remission. References to the disease are still present (from "Jocelyn": I decided in my head/That I would come back from the dead), but songs like the title track, "Ball of Twine" and "Born Human" are more upbeat than Hearn's previous album, both in tempo and in message.

In addition to providing lead vocals and playing guitar, accordion, piano and keyboards, Kevin Hearn drew the album cover. The album was packaged in a digipack with a standard jewel case booklet included within.

In a review for In Music We Trust, Kelly Guimont said: "Wonderful lyrics of unrequited longing and solid musicianship compel me to recommend this to anyone looking for a change in their personal musical landscape."

== Track listing ==
1. "Night Light"
2. "Jocelyn"
3. "Ball of Twine"
4. "Keep Fading"
5. "Where Did You Go?"
6. "Lost and Stolen"
7. "Here Come the Chimebell Trains"
8. "Invite Me In"
9. "Time Machine"
10. "Empty House"
11. "Born Human"
12. "War Pigs"
