= Rhinoceros Party of Canada candidates in the 1984 Canadian federal election =

The Rhinoceros Party of Canada ran several candidates in the 1984 federal election, none of whom was elected. Information about these candidates may be found on this page.

Many candidates chose to appear on the ballot with humorous nicknames.

== Quebec ==
=== Richelieu: Yves Pi-Oui Banville ===
Yves Banville listed himself as a writer. He received 945 votes (1.95%), finishing fifth against Progressive Conservative candidate Louis Plamondon.

=== Saint-Léonard—Anjou: Denis La Miuf Ouellet ===
Denis Ouellet listed himself as a manager. He had previously been a member of the Parti Québécois. In the 1984 election, he said he was on a secret mission "to survey Lake Winnipeg to find out how we can flush out the next of crows" that were affecting Canada's freight rates (this was a comical reference to the Crow Rate). Ouellet received 2,152 votes (3.63%), finishing fourth against Liberal candidate Alfonso Gagliano.

== Ontario ==
=== Nickel Belt: Derek Aardvark Orford ===
Derek Orford is a musician. He has released at least sixteen albums in an "alphabet" series, and has played with acts such as The Look People and Kevin Hearn and Thin Buckle. He received 288 votes (0.65%) in 1984, finishing fourth against New Democratic Party candidate John Rodriguez.

== Manitoba ==
=== Winnipeg—Birds Hill: Honest Don Bergen ===
Don Bergen described himself as a roofer. He ran for the Rhinoceros Party in two federal elections. He received 569 votes (1.09%) in 1984, finishing in fifth place against New Democratic Party incumbent Bill Blaikie.

== Alberta ==
=== Bow River: Gordon D. Taylor ===
Gordon D. Taylor was a tavern owner who ran against the similarly named Progressive Conservative incumbent Gordon E. Taylor. Gordon D. Taylor received 2,349 votes (4.16%) in 1984, finishing in fourth place while Gordon E. Taylor was reelected.
