= Pinch Me =

2000 single by Barenaked Ladies

Single by Barenaked Ladies

from the album Maroon
- B-side: "Powder Blue"; "Falling for the First Time"
- Released: August 7, 2000
- Length: 4:45 (album version); 4:37 (radio edit w/o fade); 3:49 (radio edit w/ fade)
- Label: Reprise
- Songwriters: Steven Page; Ed Robertson
- Producer: Don Was

Barenaked Ladies singles chronology
"Alcohol" (1999)	"Pinch Me" (2000)	"Too Little Too Late" (2001)

Music video
- "Pinch Me" on YouTube

"Pinch Me" is a song by Canadian rock band Barenaked Ladies. It was released as the first single from their fifth studio album, Maroon (2000), on August 7, 2000. The song became the band's last top-10 hit in Canada, peaking at number four on the RPM 100 Hit Tracks chart. In the United States, the single reached number 15 on the Billboard Hot 100 in November 2000, becoming the band's final top-40 hit there. It also peaked at number two on Billboard's Triple-A and Adult Top 40 charts.

== Background ==
The fundamental guitar riff of the song (through the verses) was based on the song "Leaving Las Vegas" by Sheryl Crow. The recording (and most live performances) is based on a drum loop (along with which drummer Tyler Stewart plays). The loop was created by taking the best two bars of Stewart himself playing drums, and then looping them. The song was originally written with the chorus rap as the less prominent "underpinning" half of the vocal, with the melody being more prominent, but as the writing process went along, the rap became the foreground. Noting that the melody line was now the background, they took the lyric and also used it for the bridge of the song.

According to Ed Robertson, during the Austin, TX concert on July 21, 2012, "Pinch Me" has one of his favorite "fake lyrics". He explained, "Often when we're writing a song, we just put in fake lyrics for a while, just to fill the space, 'cause we know what we want the melody to be, but we haven't finished the lyrics." The original chorus of the song was this: "Doesn't anyone, make a Chelsea bun, like they used to back, in the day? Sticky-sweet, it's a special treat. If Chelsea Buns were men, I'd be gay."

== Critical reception ==
Chuck Taylor, of Billboard magazine, reviewed the song favorably, saying that "the production is tight, and the melody alternates between minimalist verses and Ed Robertson's trademark hyperkinetic delivery." He goes on to say that the "quirky lyric doesn't go for the wit as past hits have, but it still captures the band's friendly side, which had earned it a strong cult following long before it tore up the charts."

== Track listings ==
US CD single

1. "Pinch Me" (radio edit)
2. "Powder Blue"

US 7-inch single

1. "Pinch Me" (radio edit) – 3:48
2. "Falling for the First Time" (album version) – 3:40

European and Australian CD single

1. "Pinch Me"
2. "Pinch Me" (radio edit)
3. "Inline Bowline"
4. "Born Human"

== Personnel ==
- Ed Robertson – lead vocals, acoustic and electric guitars
- Jim Creeggan – electric bass, viola, violin
- Kevin Hearn – electric piano, organ
- Tyler Stewart – drums
- Steven Page – backing vocals
- Rob Menegoni – shaker

== Charts ==
=== Weekly charts ===
Weekly chart performance for "Pinch Me"
Chart (2000)	Peak position
Australia (ARIA)	126
Canada Top Singles (RPM)	4
Canada Adult Contemporary (RPM)	10
Canada Rock/Alternative (RPM)	14
New Zealand (Recorded Music NZ)	41
US Billboard Hot 100	15
US Adult Alternative Airplay (Billboard)	2
US Adult Pop Airplay (Billboard)	2
US Alternative Airplay (Billboard)	30
US Pop Airplay (Billboard)	17

=== Year-end charts ===
Year-end chart performance for "Pinch Me"
Chart (2000)	Position
US Adult Top 40 (Billboard)	35
US Mainstream Top 40 (Billboard)	77
US Modern Rock Tracks (Billboard)	98
US Triple-A (Billboard)	24

Chart (2001)	Position
Canada Radio (Nielsen BDS)	63
US Adult Top 40 (Billboard)	13
US Mainstream Top 40 (Billboard)	88

== Release history ==
Release dates and formats for "Pinch Me"
Region	Date	Format(s)	Label(s)	Ref(s).
United States	August 7, 2000	Hot adult contemporary; modern adult contemporary radio	Reprise	
United States	August 8, 2000	Contemporary hit; alternative radio	Reprise	
United States	September 25, 2000	Adult contemporary radio	Reprise	
