= Kevin Hearn =

Canadian musician (born 1969)

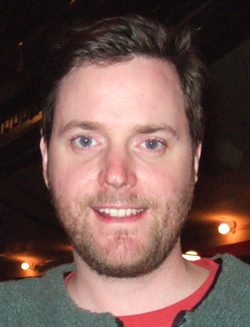
- Kevin Hearn in 2005

Background information
- Born: Kevin Neil Hearn; July 3, 1969 (age 57); Grimsby, Ontario, Canada
- Origin: Toronto, Ontario, Canada
- Genre: Alternative rock
- Occupation: Musician
- Instruments: Keyboards, vocals, guitar, accordion, mandolin
- Years active: 1988–present
- Website: kevinhearn.com

Kevin Neil Hearn (born July 3, 1969) is a Canadian musician who is a member of Barenaked Ladies, and his own group, Kevin Hearn and Thin Buckle. He primarily plays keyboards and guitars. He is also a member of Rheostatics.

== Early life ==
Hearn was born to a relatively large family, and they lived in a small home in Grimsby, Ontario, Canada. He recalls buying the Beatles' Magical Mystery Tour and a Beach Boys greatest hits record, and having them become his first two favourite albums, which led him to an interest in performing music. He has also cited electronic band Orchestral Manoeuvres in the Dark (OMD), and folk punk group Violent Femmes, as formative influences. Hearn has a classical piano background. He attended Inglenook Community High School. He also attended St. Michael's Choir School.

== Career ==
Hearn joined Look People in 1988 and played with the band until their break-up in 1993.

In 1995, he replaced departed keyboardist Andy Creeggan in the Barenaked Ladies. Hearn did not own any of the band's albums and had to learn all of the band's songs in a matter of weeks. His early contribution to the band can be heard on the live release Rock Spectacle, which was recorded on his first tour with the group. He played mostly keyboards on the songs included on the album, and some accordion. His first music video with the band was "Shoe Box", followed by the video for "The Old Apartment", although he had not played on the recording of either song. Thanks to the opportunities afforded him by his BNL gig, Hearn subsequently released his first solo album, Mothball Mint.

After extensive touring in the United States, building upon the increasing success of Rock Spectacle, the band recorded their fourth studio album, Stunt. This was Hearn's first album with the band. While Andy Creeggan was mostly focused on acoustic keyboards (mainly piano), Hearn was experienced with electronic keyboards, synthesizers and samplers. This contribution to the band's sound is evident on Stunt. Hearn also contributed some lead electric guitar to the album, having a noticeably different style than Ed Robertson or Steven Page. On August 27, 2011, Hearn played piano and sang backing vocals for Steven Page's performance of Leonard Cohen's "Hallelujah" at Jack Layton's state funeral.

=== Illness ===
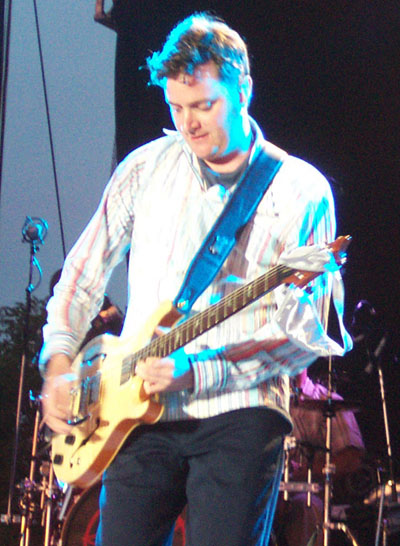
Hearn performing in 2003

Shortly after the recording of Stunt, Hearn was diagnosed with chronic myelogenous leukemia. He began treatment at the same time the band was shooting the video for "One Week", and as such, does not appear in many of the shots. He was hospitalized in Toronto while the band continued to tour in support of the new album. Several of the band's friends filled in at different points (including Chris Brown, and Greg Kurstin). Hearn ultimately required bone marrow transplants from his brother Sean Hearn, and eventually his cancer went into remission. He rejoined the band in 1999, though still dealing with the effects of the disease. He also released another solo album, called H-Wing (named for the hospital wing he was in when he wrote most of the songs) which centered on his illness. This time his album was performed with his band, Kevin Hearn & Thin Buckle.

=== Return to work ===
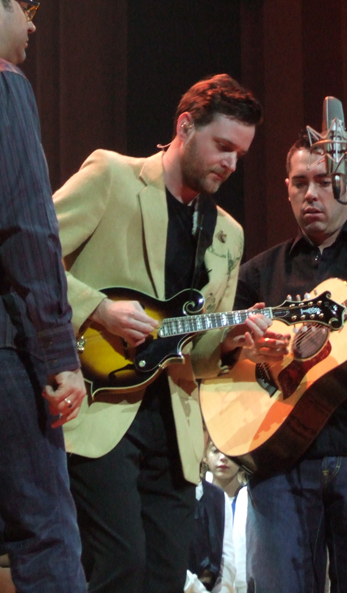
Kevin Hearn playing the mandolin, 2005

BNL's next album, Maroon, featured one of Hearn's songs, "Hidden Sun" as a hidden track at the end of the disc; his song "Born Human", later re-recorded for Thin Buckle, was recorded and left off the album. Starting with the release of the band's sixth studio album, Everything to Everyone, the band entered into a new writing process in which Hearn and Jim Creeggan brought not only songs, but also song ideas that the band would complete together. Everything to Everyone saw Hearn's first writing credits on the regular body of a BNL album. He learned to play the mandolin for the album and it has become a common instrument for him on tour. Hearn also released a third solo album, Night Light in 2003 with Thin Buckle.

A fourth album, The Miracle Mile, was released on July 11, 2006 in Canada and online. The BNL writing process from the previous album continued for their seventh studio album, Barenaked Ladies Are Me, released in September 2006.

=== Rheostatics ===
Of note are Hearn's collaborations with the Rheostatics. For their tribute album to Canadian painters the Group of Seven, entitled Music Inspired by the Group of Seven, he co-composed the music, played keyboards, and sang the song "Yellow Days Under a Lemon Sun". For the Rheostatics' 1999 release, The Story of Harmelodia, a thematic, and somewhat psychedelic, children's album, Hearn is listed as a member of the group in the liner-notes. He contributed significantly to the album and composed the songs "Wingophone" and "Monkey Bird".

In addition to Hearn's contributions to the recordings above, he performed live with the Rheostatics on many occasions throughout the latter part of the group's career. He is pictured in the group's official portrait at Zunior Records' Independent Music Hall of Fame.

=== Touring with Lou Reed ===
Hearn was part of Lou Reed's live band from 2007, including a European tour in 2011. He performed on piano and keyboards. His friendship with Reed dated back to 2001, when Hearn received a "get well soon" phone call from Reed during his fight with leukemia.

== Personal life ==
Hearn currently lives in downtown Toronto, Ontario. He also spends time at a cottage which he acquired in the early 2000s. The isolated cottage is on a lake where his family spent time when he was a child. Hearn has a daughter, Havana Winter Hearn, born in December 2003 with girlfriend Yvonne.

Hearn's cousin is actor and comedian Harland Williams, with whom he spent a lot of time as a child. They released two albums together in 2004 and 2017, as a duo known as The Cousins.

Despite the departure of Steven Page from Barenaked Ladies, Hearn has maintained a friendship with him.

His ongoing lawsuit against a Toronto art gallery, after learning that a Norval Morrisseau painting he had purchased was an apparent forgery, was profiled in Jamie Kastner's 2019 documentary film There Are No Fakes. Hearn was eventually awarded $60,000 in compensation in September 2019.

== Discography ==
=== Look People ===
- More Songs About Hats and Chickens (1989)
- Small Fish, Big Pond (1990)
- Boogazm (1991)
- Crazy Eggs (1993)

=== Corky and the Juice Pigs ===
- Pants (1994)

=== Rheostatics ===
- Music Inspired by the Group of Seven (1995)
- The Story of Harmelodia (1999)
- The Whale Music Concert, 1992 (2005)
- Calling Out the Chords, Vol. 1 (2005)
- Green Sprouts Music Week 1993 (2012)

=== Barenaked Ladies ===
See Barenaked Ladies' discography; Hearn's contributions include releases from 1996 until present.

=== Solo ===
- Mothball Mint (1997)
- Cloud Maintenance (2011)
- Days in Frames (2014)
- Calm and Cents (2019)

=== Kevin Hearn & Thin Buckle ===
- H-Wing (2001)
- Night Light (2004)
- The Miracle Mile (2006)
- Havana Winter (2009)

=== The Cousins ===
- The Love Song Years (2004)
- Rattlesnake Love (2017)
