= Barenaked Ladies discography =

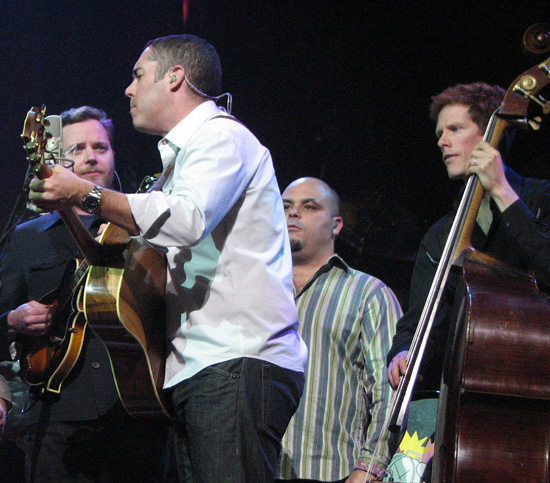
- Kevin Hearn, Ed Robertson, Tyler Stewart, and Jim Creeggan (l-r)
- Studio albums: 14
- Extended plays: 4
- Live albums: 5
- Compilation albums: 4
- Singles: 41
- Video albums: 6
- Music videos: 39
- Pre-label Releases: 5
- Themed albums: 3
- Collaboration albums: 1

The discography of Canadian alternative rock band Barenaked Ladies consists of 14 primary studio albums, three themed studio albums, 41 singles, three live albums, two greatest hits compilations, and three video releases. This list does not include material recorded by band members individually or with other side projects.

Barenaked Ladies was formed in 1988 by Steven Page and Ed Robertson, both singer-songwriter guitarists. Andy and Jim Creeggan joined the group on percussion and bass respectively approximately a year later. In mid-1990, Tyler Stewart joined the band as drummer with Andy Creeggan shifting to keyboards after returning from an exchange trip. Andy Creeggan left the band before the mid-1995 sessions for its third album (recorded as a four-piece). He was replaced by Kevin Hearn later on in 1995. The band's lineup remained unchanged until Page left the band in early 2009. They have sold at least 15 million records including albums and singles.

== Albums ==
=== Pre-label releases ===
The following albums were recorded and released prior to the band's first major record deal, consisting of demo/promo tapes. The Yellow Tape was commercially successful.

| Year | Album | Chart positions | Certifications (sales thresholds) | Notes |
| Year | Album | CAN | Certifications (sales thresholds) | Notes |
|---|---|---|---|---|
| 1988 | Buck Naked | — | | Demo tape — Several versions released. Steven Page and Ed Robertson only. |
| 1990 | Barenaked Lunch | — | | Demo tape — Limited distributed, band now quartet with addition of brothers Andy and Jim Creeggan. |
| 1990 | Barenaked Recess | — | | Demo tape — Unreleased. |
| 1991 | Barenaked Ladies (The Yellow Tape) | 9 | MC: Gold | Demo tape — Became commercial following demand; band now quintet with addition of drummer Tyler Stewart. |
| 1991 | Variety Recordings | — | | Recorded as a radio promo disc. |
| 1992 | Barenaked Ladies | — | | UK re-release of the Yellow Tape released in a CD and vinyl format. |

=== Studio albums ===
The following are LP length studio albums which contain original material with no specified theme or topic:

| Year | Album | Chart positions | | | | | Certifications (sales thresholds) |
| Year | Album | CAN | NZ | UK | US | US Rock | Certifications (sales thresholds) |
|---|---|---|---|---|---|---|---|
| 1992 | Gordon: Released: July 28, 1992; Label: Reprise; Format: CD, cassette, vinyl | 1 | — | — | — | — | MC: Diamond; RIAA: Gold |
| 1994 | Maybe You Should Drive: Released: August 16, 1994; Label: Sire/Reprise; Format: CD, cassette | 2 | — | 57 | 175 | — | MC: 2× Platinum |
| 1996 | Born on a Pirate Ship: Released: March 19, 1996; Label: Reprise; Format: CD, cassette | 12 | — | — | 111 | — | MC: Gold; RIAA: Gold |
| 1998 | Stunt: Released: July 7, 1998; Label: Reprise; Format: CD, cassette, vinyl | 9 | 20 | 20 | 3 | — | MC: 4× Platinum; RIAA: 4× Platinum; BPI: Gold |
| 2000 | Maroon: Released: September 12, 2000; Label: Reprise; Format: CD, cassette, DVD-Audio | 2 | — | 64 | 5 | — | MC: Platinum; RIAA: Platinum |
| 2003 | Everything to Everyone: Released: October 21, 2003; Label: Reprise; Format: CD, DVD-Audio | 6 | — | 176 | 10 | — | |
| 2006 | Barenaked Ladies Are Me: Released: September 12, 2006; Label: Desperation; Format: CD, vinyl, USB stick, DVD-Audio | 7 | — | — | 17 | — | |
| 2007 | Barenaked Ladies Are Men: Released: February 6, 2007; Label: Desperation; Format: CD, USB stick, DVD-Audio (as part of "Barenaked Ladies Are Men Deluxe Edition 5.1") | 39 | — | — | 102 | — | |
| 2010 | All in Good Time: Released: March 30, 2010; Label: Raisin'; Format: CD, vinyl | 3 | — | 169 | 23 | 2 | |
| 2013 | Grinning Streak: Released: June 4, 2013; Label: Vanguard; Format: CD, vinyl | 12 | — | 101 | 10 | 5 | |
| 2015 | Silverball: Released: June 2, 2015; Label: Vanguard; Format: CD, vinyl | 3 | — | — | 46 | 5 | |
| 2017 | Fake Nudes: Released: November 17, 2017; Label: Vanguard; Format: CD, vinyl | 24 | — | — | 72 | 48 | |
| 2021 | Detour de Force: Released July 16, 2021; Label: Raisin'; Format: CD, vinyl | — | — | — | — | — | |
| 2023 | In Flight: Released September 15, 2023; Label: Raisin'; Format: CD, vinyl, cassette | — | — | — | — | — | |

=== Themed/topical studio albums ===
The following are studio albums whose content has a specified unifying topic or purpose. This includes a holiday album, a soundtrack to a Stratford Shakespeare production, and an album of songs geared towards children.

| Year | Album | Chart positions | | Certifications (sales thresholds) |
| Year | Album | CAN | US | Certifications (sales thresholds) |
|---|---|---|---|---|
| 2004 | Barenaked for the Holidays: Released: October 5, 2004; Label: Desperation; Format: CD, USB stick | 26 | 64 | MC: Gold |
| 2005 | As You Like It: Released: June 3, 2005; Label: Desperation; Format: CD | — | — | |
| 2008 | Snacktime!: Released: May 6, 2008; Label: Desperation; Format: CD, CD & Book Combo | 10 | 61 | |

=== Compilation albums ===
Barenaked Ladies have released three greatest hits compilations (the first was released November 13, 2001, the second on September 27, 2011, and the third on October 4, 2019) as well as an iTunes Music Store-exclusive iTunes Originals which compiles old tracks along with newly recorded live performances and interviews. A compilation of 12 unreleased demos, b-sides, remixes and live recordings from 1992 to 2003 was released May 8, 2012.

| Year | Album | Chart positions | | Certifications (sales thresholds) |
| Year | Album | CAN | US | Certifications (sales thresholds) |
|---|---|---|---|---|
| 2001 | Disc One: All Their Greatest Hits (1991–2001): Released: November 13, 2001; Label: Reprise; Format: CD, cassette | 3 | 38 | MC: 2× Platinum; RIAA: Gold |
| 2006 | iTunes Originals – Barenaked Ladies: Released: January 10, 2006; Label: Desperation; Format: Digital download | — | — | |
| 2011 | Hits from Yesterday & the Day Before: Released: September 27, 2011; Label: Rhino; Format: CD | — | — | |
| 2012 | Stop Us If You've Heard This One Before: Released: May 8, 2012; Label: Rhino; Format: CD | — | — | |
| 2019 | Original Hits, Original Stars: Released: October 4, 2019; Label: Rhino; Format: Vinyl | — | — | |

=== Live albums ===
Barenaked Ladies has three true commercial live album releases as released by the band's label at that time. The band has also recorded and released many of their regular concerts for their fans both digitally and in directly retailed physical media (CDs and flash drives), though these are typically mixed live during the show and are released as-is. Some of these concert recordings have become available in through some commercial retailers in both digital and CD form, though these are not considered a part of the band's primary discography. Similarly, a compilation of these live tracks, released in 2006 as part of the Extended Versions album series, is not considered a part of the band's primary discography.

| Year | Album | Chart positions | Certifications (sales thresholds) |
| Year | Album | US | Certifications (sales thresholds) |
|---|---|---|---|
| 1996 | Rock Spectacle: Released: November 19, 1996; Label: Reprise; Format: CD, cassette | 86 | RIAA: Platinum |
| 2004 | Everything to Everyone Tour Recordings: Released: February–May 2004; Label: Nettwerk; Format: CD, digital | — | |
| 2006 | Extended Versions: Released: November 29, 2006; Label: Sony BMG Music Entertainment; Format: CD | — | |
| 2007 | Talk to the Hand: Live in Michigan: Released: November 6, 2007; Label: Desperation; Format: CD, DVD | — | |
| 2016 | BNL Rocks Red Rocks: Released: May 20, 2016; Label: Vanguard; Format: CD | 101 | |

=== Collaboration albums ===
Barenaked Ladies collaborated with New York a cappella group The Persuasions in October 2016. During the 2 day session, they recorded 15 songs that would later become a collaboration album, titled Ladies and Gentlemen: Barenaked Ladies and The Persuasions. The album was released April 14, 2017.

| Year | Album | Chart positions |
| Year | Album | CAN |
|---|---|---|
| 2017 | Ladies and Gentlemen: Barenaked Ladies and The Persuasions: Released: April 14, 2017; Label: Vanguard; Format: CD, vinyl | 87 |

== Extended plays ==
Barenaked Ladies have released one extended play disc consisting of commercially unreleased tracks (new songs or new versions), which also included enhanced multimedia content. Other EP releases were download-only compilations of previously released tracks.

| Year | Album | Certifications (sales thresholds) |
|---|---|---|
| 1995 | Shoe Box E.P.: Released: February 6, 1996; Label: Reprise; Format: CD | |
| 2003 | Everything Acoustic E.P.: Released: September 30, 2003; Label: Reprise; Format: Digital download | |
| 2005 | Barenaked for Hanukkah E.P.: Released: November 15, 2005; Label: Desperation Records; Format: Digital download | MC: Gold |
| 2014 | The Long Weekend E.P.: Released: July 1, 2014; Label: Raisin Records; Format: Digital download | |
| 2019 | Fake Nudes: Naked: Released: May 30, 2019; Label: Raisin Records; Format: Digital download | |

== Singles ==
List of singles, with selected chart positions and certifications, showing year released and album name
| Year | Title | Peak chart positions | | | | | | | | | | Certifications | Album |
| Year | Title | CAN | CAN AC | AUS | NZ | UK | US | US Alt | US Adult | US AAA | US Pop | Certifications | Album |
|---|---|---|---|---|---|---|---|---|---|---|---|---|---|
| 1992 | "Lovers in a Dangerous Time" | 16 | 24 | — | — | — | — | — | — | — | — | | Kick at the Darkness |
| 1992 | "Be My Yoko Ono" | 77 | — | — | — | — | — | — | — | — | — | | Gordon |
| 1992 | "Enid" | 2 | — | — | — | — | — | — | — | — | — | | Gordon |
| 1992 | "Grade 9" | 53 | — | — | — | — | — | — | — | — | — | | Gordon |
| 1992 | "If I Had $1000000" | 13 | — | — | — | — | — | — | 37 | — | — | | Gordon |
| 1993 | "Brian Wilson" | 18 | — | — | — | — | — | — | — | — | — | | Gordon |
| 1993 | "What a Good Boy" | 34 | — | — | — | — | — | — | — | — | — | | Gordon |
| 1994 | "Jane" | 3 | 1 | — | — | — | — | — | — | — | — | | Maybe You Should Drive |
| 1994 | "Alternative Girlfriend" | 22 | 4 | — | — | — | — | — | — | — | — | | Maybe You Should Drive |
| 1995 | "Life, in a Nutshell" | 29 | 21 | — | — | — | — | — | — | — | — | | Maybe You Should Drive |
| 1996 | "Shoe Box" | 10 | 15 | — | — | — | — | — | — | — | — | | Born on a Pirate Ship |
| 1996 | "The Old Apartment" | 14 | 32 | — | — | — | 88 | — | — | — | 40 | | Born on a Pirate Ship |
| 1996 | "Break Your Heart" | — | 47 | — | — | — | — | — | — | — | — | | Born on a Pirate Ship |
| 1997 | "Brian Wilson" (2000/live versions) | — | — | — | — | 73 | 68 | 23 | 37 | 15 | — | | Rock Spectacle |
| 1998 | "One Week" | 3 | 5 | 16 | — | 5 | 1 | 1 | 2 | 2 | 1 | ARIA: Gold; BPI: Platinum; RMNZ: Platinum | Stunt |
| 1998 | "It's All Been Done" | 1 | 1 | 57 | — | 28 | 44 | 15 | 9 | 6 | 18 | | Stunt |
| 1999 | "Alcohol" | 73 | — | — | — | — | — | 33 | — | — | — | | Stunt |
| 1999 | "Call and Answer" | 10 | 6 | 81 | — | 52 | — (Note: "Call and Answer" did not enter the Billboard Hot 100, but peaked at number 21 on the Bubbling Under Hot 100 chart.) | — | 17 | — | — | | Stunt |
| 1999 | "Get in Line" | 18 | 26 | — | — | — | — | — | 28 | — | — | | King of the Hill soundtrack |
| 2000 | "Pinch Me" | 4 | 10 | — | 41 | — | 15 | 30 | 2 | 2 | 17 | | Maroon |
| 2001 | "Too Little Too Late" | 9 | — | — | — | 122 | 86 | — | 13 | 11 | 40 | | Maroon |
| 2001 | "Falling for the First Time" | 15 | — | — | — | — | — | — | 11 | — | — | | Maroon |
| 2003 | "Another Postcard" | 28 | — | — | — | — | 82 | — | 9 | 14 | — | | Everything to Everyone |
| 2004 | "Testing 1,2,3" | — | — | — | — | — | — | — | 19 | 10 | — | | Everything to Everyone |
| 2004 | "Celebrity" | — | — | — | — | 81 | — | — | — | — | — | | Everything to Everyone |
| 2004 | "For You" | — | — | — | — | — | — | — | — | — | — | | Everything to Everyone |
| 2004 | "Maybe Katie" | — | — | — | — | — | — | — | — | — | — | | Everything to Everyone |
| 2006 | "Easy" | — | 6 | — | — | — | — (Note: "Easy" did not enter the Billboard Hot 100, but peaked at number 22 on the Bubbling Under Hot 100 chart.) | — | — | 11 | — | | Barenaked Ladies Are Men |
| 2006 | "Wind It Up" | — | — | — | — | — | — | — | — | 26 | — | | Barenaked Ladies Are Men |
| 2007 | "Sound of Your Voice" | — | — | — | — | — | — | — | — | — | — | | Barenaked Ladies Are Men |
| 2008 | "7 8 9" | — | — | — | — | — | — | — | — | — | — | | Snacktime! |
| 2008 | "Pollywog in a Bog" | — | — | — | — | — | — | — | — | — | — | | Snacktime! |
| 2008 | "Drawing" | — | — | — | — | — | — | — | — | — | — | | Snacktime! |
| 2010 | "You Run Away" | 25 | 5 | — | — | — | — | — | 21 | 19 | — | | All in Good Time |
| 2010 | "Every Subway Car" (featuring Erin McCarley) | — | — | — | — | — | — | — | — | — | — | | All in Good Time |
| 2010 | "The Big Bang Theory Theme" (History of Everything) | — | — | — | — | — | — | — | — | — | — | | Non-album single |
| 2013 | "Boomerang" | — | 11 | — | — | — | — | — | — | — | — | | Grinning Streak |
| 2013 | "Odds Are" | 89 | 16 | — | — | — | — | — | — | — | — | | Grinning Streak |
| 2014 | "Did I Say That Out Loud?" | — | — | — | — | — | — | — | — | — | — | | Grinning Streak |
| 2014 | "Our Blue Dot" | — | — | — | — | — | — | — | — | — | — | | Non-album single |
| 2015 | "Say What You Want" | — | — | — | — | — | — | — | — | — | — | | Silverball |
| 2015 | "Duct Tape Heart" | — | — | — | — | — | — | — | — | — | — | | Silverball |
| 2017 | "Lookin' Up" | — | — | — | — | — | — | — | — | — | — | | Fake Nudes |
| 2020 | "Gotta Be Patient" (with Michael Buble and Sofia Reyes) | — (Note: "Gotta Be Patient" did not enter the Canadian Hot 100, but peaked at number 10 on the Canadian Digital Song Sales chart.) | — | — | — | — | — | — | — | — | — | | Non-album single |
| 2021 | "Flip" | — | — | — | — | — | — | — | — | — | — | | Detour de Force |
| 2021 | "New Disaster" | — | — | — | — | — | — | — | — | — | — | | Detour de Force |
| 2021 | "Landed on My Head" | — | — | — | — | — | — | — | — | — | — | | The Super Bob Einstein Movie |
| 2023 | "Lovin' Life" | — | — | — | — | — | — | — | — | — | — | | In Flight |
| 2023 | "Too Old" | — | — | — | — | — | — | — | — | — | — | | In Flight |
| 2026 | "Almost Ready" | — | — | — | — | — | — | — | — | — | — | | Non-Album single |
| 2026 | "Careful (For Dee)" | — | | | | | | | | | | | Non-Album single |

== Music videos ==
| Title | Year | Director(s) |
|---|---|---|
| "Lovers in a Dangerous Time" | 1992 | Tim Hamilton |
| "Enid" | 1992 | Tim Hamilton |
| "Brian Wilson" | 1993 | Stephen Scott |
| "What a Good Boy" | 1993 | Larry Jordan |
| "Be My Yoko Ono" | 1993 | Larry Jordan |
| "Jane" | 1994 | Peter Henderson |
| "Alternative Girlfriend" | 1994 | Adam Bernstein |
| "Shoe Box" | 1996 | Scott Kalvert |
| "The Old Apartment" | 1996 | Jason Priestley |
| "Brian Wilson" (live) | 1997 | |
| "One Week" | 1998 | McG |
| "It's All Been Done" | 1998 | Doug Aitken |
| "Call and Answer" | 1999 | David Hogan |
| "Get In Line" | 1999 | Phil Harder |
| "Pinch Me" | 2000 | Phil Harder |
| "Too Little Too Late" | 2001 | Phil Harder |
| "Falling for the First Time" | 2001 | Tim Godsall |
| "Thanks That Was Fun" | 2001 | Pierre Tremblay |
| "Another Postcard" | 2003 | |
| "Testing 1,2,3" | 2004 | |
| "Easy" | 2006 | |
| "Wind It Up" | 2006 | |
| "Sound of Your Voice" | 2007 | |
| "7 8 9" | 2008 | |
| "Pollywog in a Bog" | 2008 | J. P. Riley |
| "Drawing" | 2008 | |
| "You Run Away" | 2010 | |
| "Every Subway Car" | 2010 | |
| "The Big Bang Theory Theme" | 2011 | |
| "Boomerang" (lyric video) | 2013 | |
| "Boomerang" | 2013 | |
| "Odds Are" (lyric video) | 2013 | |
| "Odds Are" | 2013 | Matt Hullum |
| "Did I Say That Out Loud?" | 2014 | Matt Hullum |
| "Silverball" | 2015 | Barenaked Ladies |
| "Say What You Want" | 2015 | Matt Hullum |
| "Duct Tape Heart" (lyric video) | 2015 | |
| "Duct Tape Heart" | 2015 | |
| "One Week" (live lyric video) | 2016 | |
| "Lookin' Up" | 2017 | Matt Hullum |
| "Bringing It Home" | 2017 | Barenaked Ladies |
| "Navigate" | 2019 | Barenaked Ladies |
| "Flip" | 2021 | Stefano Bertelli |
| "New Disaster" | 2021 | Enis Cisic and Toni Huml |
| "Good Life" | 2021 | Edward Pond |
| "Lovin' Life" | 2023 | Edward Pond |

== DVD/Video releases ==
| Year | Album | Certifications (sales thresholds) |
|---|---|---|
| 1999 | Barenaked in America: Released: 1999; Label: Shooting Gallery | |
| 2000 | Too Little Too Late (DVD single): Released: 2000; Label: Reprise | |
| 2002 | Barelaked Nadies: Released: November 5, 2002; Label: Reprise | MC: Gold |
| 2004 | The Barenaked Truth: Released: 2004; Label: Take 3 Productions | MC: Platinum |
| 2007 | Talk to the Hand: Live in Michigan: Released: November 6, 2007; Label: Desperation Records | |
| 2008 | Ships & Dip III: You Never Know What's Gonna Happen on the Cruz-Ah!: Released: 2008; Label: Desperation Records | |

== Alternate format releases ==
=== Flash drive ===
| Year | Release | Content |
|---|---|---|
| 2005 | Barenaked on a Stick | Primarily contains Barenaked for the Holidays, plus bonus content. |
| 2006 | Barenaked on a Stick: Barenaked Ladies Are Men | Primarily contains Barenaked Ladies Are Men Deluxe Edition, plus bonus content |

== Other songs ==
=== Songs recorded for non-album use ===
- "Lovers in a Dangerous Time" on Kick at the Darkness (1991) (later included on Disc One) - a cover of Bruce Cockburn for a tribute album
- "The Ballad of Gordon" as a PSA for FOX around the release of Gordon
- "Fight the Power" on Coneheads soundtrack (1993) - a cover of Public Enemy
- "Grim Grinning Ghosts" on Disney's Music From The Park (1996)
- "Gangster Girl" for The Wrong Guy film (1997)
- "Get in Line" on King of the Hill soundtrack (1999) (later included on Disc One)
- "When Doves Cry" on Andrew Denton's Musical Challenge Vol. 2, a Prince cover recorded for the Andrew Denton Breakfast Show on Australia's Triple M Radio (1999)
- "Green Christmas" on The Grinch soundtrack (2000) - later re-recorded for Maybe This Christmas Too? (2003), and again for Barenaked for the Holidays; included on various other holiday compilations
- "La La La La Lemon" on For the Kids (2002)
- "One Little Slip" on Chicken Little soundtrack (2005)
- "Legal Age Life at Variety Store" on The Secret Sessions (2007) - recorded live at their February 12, 2007 concert in Regina, SK with Jason Plumb and Tim Mech
- "The Other Day I Met a Bear" on The Simple Life: Camp Songs (2007)
- "I.S.S. (Is Somebody Singing)" (2013) - featuring Chris Hadfield and the Wexford Gleeks, commissioned by the Canadian Broadcasting Corporation and the Canadian Space Agency for the International Space Station

=== Theme songs ===
- Royal Canadian Air Farce (1993)
- Seven Little Monsters (2000)
- The Big Bang Theory - Big Bang Theory Theme (2007)
- "TFC" - Official team theme for Toronto FC of Major League Soccer (2007)
