= Disc One: All Their Greatest Hits (1991–2001) =

Greatest hits album by Barenaked Ladies
- Released: November 13, 2001
- Recorded: 1991–2001
- Genre: Alternative rock
- Length: 73:23
- Label: Reprise
- Producer: Barenaked Ladies, Dan Durbin, David Kahne, David Leonard, Ben Mink, Susan Rogers, Jim Scott, Don Was, Aubrey Winfield, Michael Phillip Wojewoda

Barenaked Ladies chronology
| Maroon (2000) | Disc One: All Their Greatest Hits (1991–2001) (2001) | Everything Acoustic (2003) |

Professional ratings
Review scores
| Source | Rating |
|---|---|
| Allmusic | 4/5 stars |
| Encyclopedia of Popular Music | 3/5 stars |
| Popmatters | Mostly Positive |
| The Rolling Stone Album Guide | 3.5/5 stars |

Disc One: All Their Greatest Hits (1991–2001) is a greatest hits compilation album by Canadian rock band Barenaked Ladies which spans their first decade as a band. It contains released singles, plus new songs "It's Only Me (The Wizard of Magicland)" and "Thanks That Was Fun", the latter which was released as a single. Disc One was released in November 2001 to a warm commercial reaction and was certified gold in the United States. The title itself is a tongue-in-cheek reference to a line from the "Box Set" off the album Gordon, which is about a box set release from a has-been band: "Disc One – it's where we've begun/It's all my greatest hits/And if you are a fan then you know that you've already got 'em." The album was released two months after the September 11 attacks, and is dedicated to the victims. The album was among the top 50 best-selling albums of 2001 in Canada and the fourth best-selling album of the year in Canada by a Canadian artist.

== Content ==
The album compiles singles from the band's catalogue to that point, including two that had not been previously released on an album: "Lovers in a Dangerous Time" (a cover of the Bruce Cockburn song from a 1991 Cockburn tribute album) and "Get in Line" (from the 1999 King of the Hill soundtrack). Several other singles have edits and alternate versions. Some had been previously released (such as the "Shoe Box" radio remix), while others had new mixes created. Initially, the band was uncertain if they should include minor hits "Be My Yoko Ono" and "Alternative Girlfriend". They held a poll on their website and the result was a nearly 50/50 split. As a result, the band decided to include both songs, resulting in the album running over 73 minutes long. Though the radio mix of "The Old Apartment" was used, the instrumental introduction was eliminated. Similarly, a new edit of "Pinch Me" was created using the radio edit's cropped intro, but leaving in the album version's guitar solo outro.

The album was touted as completely remastered, but as is the modern practice due to the loudness war (not employed to the same extent in the early 1990s), all the tracks were mastered at a very high volume level, noticeably higher than any of the original recordings, resulting in increased compression and some clipping.

Two other tracks were recorded for this album, but omitted from the finished record: "I Don't Get It Anymore" and "I Can, I Will, I Do" (held for the Shallow Hal soundtrack, but cut from it; re-recorded for Everything to Everyone, but cut from that album; re-recorded again for Barenaked Ladies Are Men). These recordings of "I Don't Get It Anymore" and "I Can, I Will, I Do" were later released on the rarity album, Stop Us If You've Heard This One Before in 2012.

== Song releases ==
In line with the album's retrospective contents, the video for the single "Thanks That Was Fun" was a montage of all of the band's prior music videos (with singer's mouths altered to appear to be singing the new song). Because of this, former keyboardist Andy Creeggan can be glimpsed in the video. The band wanted to name the single "One Weaker", as a followup to the hit single "One Week", but management refused to allow it.

The album's other original song, "It's Only Me (The Wizard of Magicland)" was included on the soundtrack for the EA Sports video game NHL 2002, along with tracks from several other Canadian artists. In addition, the band members' names and faces were included in the game, and can be accessed by creating custom players with their names.

During the band's Fall/Winter 2001 Greatest Hits Tour, both "Thanks That Was Fun" and "It's Only Me (The Wizard of Magicland)" were performed under the guise of a "new greatest hit", poking fun at the industry practice oxymoron of including several new songs as part of a greatest hits package.

== Track listing ==
All tracks are written by Steven Page and Ed Robertson, except where noted.

| No. | Title | Writer(s) | Album | Length |
|---|---|---|---|---|
| 1. | "The Old Apartment" (new edit of radio mix) | | Born on a Pirate Ship | 3:30 |
| 2. | "Falling for the First Time" | | Maroon | 3:40 |
| 3. | "Brian Wilson" (live) | Page | Rock Spectacle | 4:46 |
| 4. | "One Week" | Robertson | Stunt | 2:52 |
| 5. | "Be My Yoko Ono" | | Gordon | 2:45 |
| 6. | "Alternative Girlfriend" | Page; Stephen Duffy | Maybe You Should Drive | 4:23 |
| 7. | "It's Only Me (The Wizard of Magicland)" | | — | 2:34 |
| 8. | "If I Had $1,000,000" | | Gordon | 4:27 |
| 9. | "Call and Answer" | Page; Duffy | Stunt | 5:49 |
| 10. | "Get in Line" | Page; Robertson; Jim Creeggan | King of the Hill | 3:39 |
| 11. | "It's All Been Done" | Page | Stunt | 3:26 |
| 12. | "Jane" | Page; Duffy | Maybe You Should Drive | 4:04 |
| 13. | "Lovers in a Dangerous Time" | Bruce Cockburn | Kick at the Darkness | 4:00 |
| 14. | "Pinch Me" (radio edit) | | Maroon | 4:37 |
| 15. | "Shoe Box" (radio remix) | | Born on a Pirate Ship | 3:08 |
| 16. | "What a Good Boy" (live) | | Rock Spectacle | 4:47 |
| 17. | "Too Little Too Late" | | Maroon | 3:24 |
| 18. | "Enid" | | Gordon | 4:07 |
| 19. | "Thanks That Was Fun" | | — | 3:41 |
| Total length: | | | | 73:39 |

== Personnel ==
Barenaked Ladies

- Steven Page – lead (1, 3, 5, 6, 7, 9–12, 15, 16, 17, 18; co-lead on "One Week," "If I Had $1,000,000," and "Lovers in a Dangerous Time") and background vocals, acoustic (3, 6, 11, 12, 16) and electric (1, 11, 15) guitars, liner notes annotations
- Ed Robertson – background (1, 3, 5, 6, 7, 10, 11, 12, 15, 16, 17, 18) and lead (2, 14, 19; co-lead on "One Week," "If I Had $1,000,000," and "Lovers in a Dangerous Time") vocals, electric (1, 2, 4, 6, 7, 9–12, 14, 15, 17, 18, 19) and acoustic (all except 1, 6, 7, 10, 13, 15 and 17) guitars, handclaps (17)
- Jim Creeggan – double bass (1, 3, 5, 8–11, 13, 15, 16, 18, 19), double electric bass (4), electric bass (2, 6, 7), handclaps (17), viola and violin (on "Pinch Me"), background vocals (2, 3, 5, 6, 8, 11, 12, 15, 17, 18)
- Tyler Stewart – drums, handclaps (on "Too Little Too Late"), tambourine (on "Shoe Box" and "Too Little Too Late"), background vocals (on "It's All Been Done")
- Kevin Hearn – clavinet (17), electric guitar (4), electric piano (14), handclaps (17), keyboards (11, 14), organ (14, 17), piano (2, 3, 9, 16), sampler (17), background vocals (2, 7, 11, 17)
- Andy Creeggan – acoustic piano (8), congas (5), electric piano (6), hammered dulcimer (12), organ (6), tambourine (5, 6, 12), background vocals (5, 6, 8, 12, 18)

Production

- Barenaked Ladies – producers (1, 4, 5, 9, 11, 13, 15)
- Ben Mink – producer ("Alternative Girlfriend", "Jane")
- David Leonard and Susan Rogers – producers (4, 9, 11)
- Don Was – producer (2, 14, 17)
- Michael Phillip Wojewoda – producer (1, 3, 8, 15, 16, 18)
- David Kahne – producer and drum programming on "Get in Line"
- Jim Scott – producer and engineer on "It's Only Me" and "Thanks That Was Fun"
- Aubrey Windfield, Dan Durbin – producers on "Lovers in a Dangerous Time"
- Ben Grosse – remix ("The Old Apartment")
- Tom Lord-Alge – remix ("It's All Been Done")
- Richard Sebree – photography
- John Rummen – design
- Kevin Hearn – illustrations
- Howie Klein, Larry LeBlanc – liner notes

== Charts ==
=== Weekly charts ===
Weekly chart performance for Disc One: All Their Greatest Hits (1991–2001)
| Chart (2001) | Peak position |
|---|---|
| Canadian Albums (Billboard) | 3 |
| US Billboard 200 | 38 |

=== Year-end charts ===
2001 year-end chart performance for Disc One: All Their Greatest Hits (1991–2001)
| Chart (2001) | Position |
|---|---|
| Canadian Albums (Nielsen SoundScan) | 49 |

2002 year-end chart performance for Disc One: All Their Greatest Hits (1991–2001)
| Chart (2002) | Position |
|---|---|
| Canadian Albums (Nielsen SoundScan) | 77 |
| Canadian Alternative Albums (Nielsen SoundScan) | 22 |
