= Brian Wilson (song) =

Barenaked Ladies song

Single by Barenaked Ladies

from the album Gordon
- Released: 1992
- Recorded: 1992
- Genre: Alternative rock
- Length: 4:48
- Label: Reprise
- Songwriter: Steven Page
- Producers: Barenaked Ladies, Michael Phillip Wojewoda

Barenaked Ladies singles chronology
"If I Had $1000000" (1992)	"Brian Wilson" (1992)	"What a Good Boy" (1993)

Music video
- "Brian Wilson" on YouTube

"Brian Wilson" is a song by Canadian rock band Barenaked Ladies from their 1992 album Gordon. The song was written by Steven Page as a tribute to the Beach Boys' co-founder Brian Wilson. It was released as a single and peaked at number 18 on the Canadian Singles Chart. In 1998, the song peaked at number 68 on the US Billboard Hot 100. Wilson himself covered the song on his live album Live at the Roxy Theatre (2000). In 2000, the song was voted as the 24th best New Rock song released between 1990 and 2000 by CFNY-FM listeners.

== Background and lyricism ==
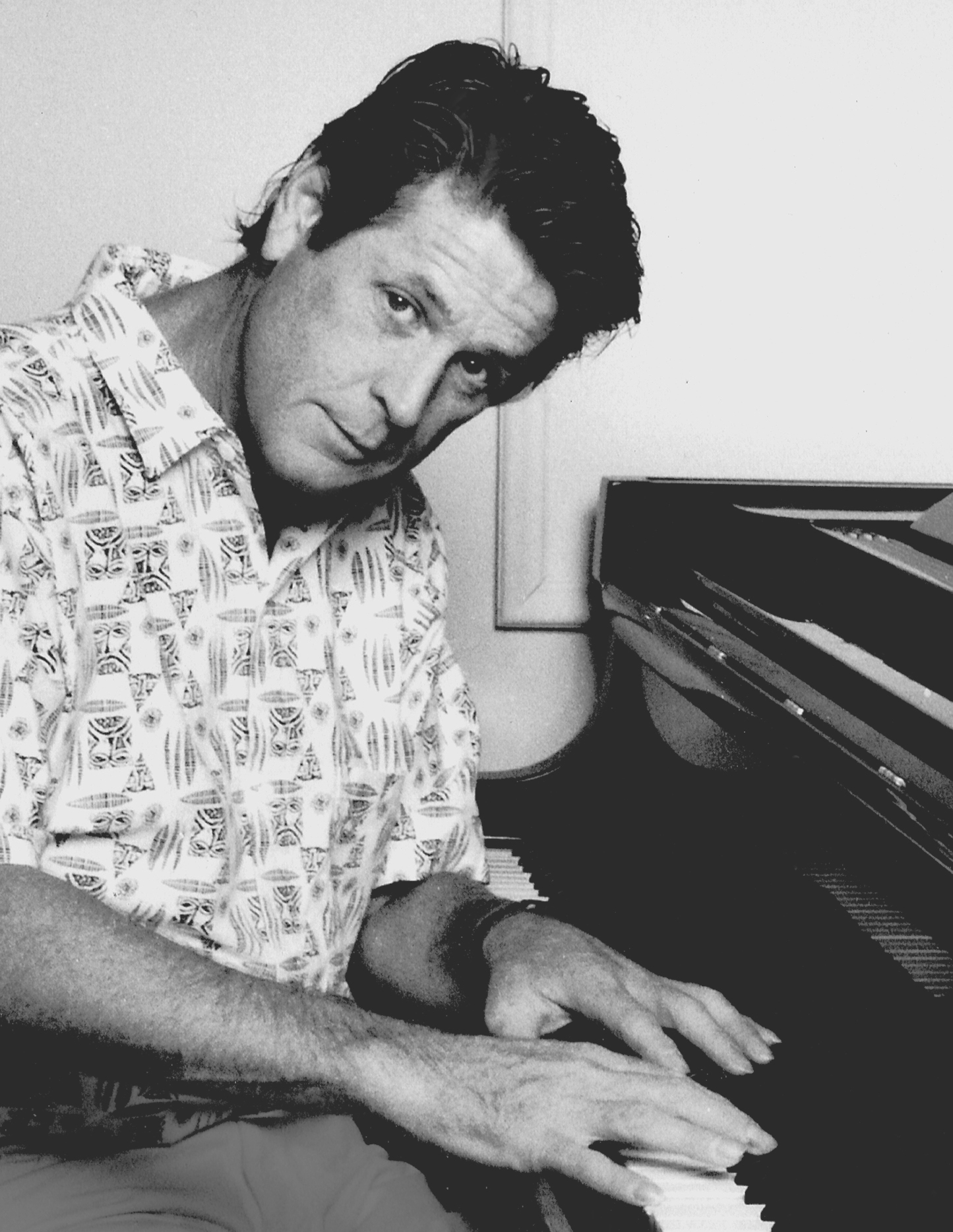
The song's subject, Brian Wilson, in 1990

The song was written by singer/guitarist Steven Page in his parents' basement around his twentieth birthday, in 1990. The first lines of the song chronicle one of Page's many late-night journeys to Sam the Record Man on Yonge Street. The song generally tells the story of a man whose life parallels that of the Beach Boys' Brian Wilson, particularly during his time spent with psychologist Eugene Landy after Wilson was diagnosed with mental illness, and, more broadly, with lyrics about suffering from comorbid mental illness and obesity.

== Variations ==
Steven Page stated in the liner notes for Disc One: All Their Greatest Hits that the song has more "official" recordings than any other song in their repertoire, saying that there are at least five. The song was first recorded for the never-released 1990 BNL cassette, Barenaked Recess. After Tyler Stewart joined the band in 1991 as a drummer, it was re-recorded for the band's platinum-selling Yellow Tape, in 1992 for Gordon, in 1996 for the live album Rock Spectacle, and again in 1997 for a version which was called "Brian Wilson 2000" and was released as a single.

=== Brian Wilson 2000 ===
"Brian Wilson 2000"

Single by Barenaked Ladies

from the album Rock Spectacle
- B-side: "Back" (US)
- Released: October 28, 1997
- Recorded: 1997
- Length: 3:57
- Label: Reprise
- Songwriter: Steven Page
- Producers: Barenaked Ladies, Michael Phillip Wojewoda

Barenaked Ladies singles chronology
"The Old Apartment" (1997)	"Brian Wilson 2000" (1997)	"One Week" (1998)

"Brian Wilson 2000" is a shortened form of the song for radio play, recorded to sound more like their live performance than the original Gordon version did. The band's management worried that radio stations would not play the live version that had recently gained popularity. The most noticeable differences are that "2000" replaces the first verse with an 8-bar instrumental introduction, and the outro is considerably shortened as well. However, most radio stations decided to play the live version instead, which explains why the live version was included on Disc One: All Their Greatest Hits.

The U.S. release included the non-album song "Back."

A music video for "Brian Wilson 2000" was filmed at The Opera House in Toronto on February 22, 1998 and released later that year.

== Brian Wilson version ==
Wilson rearranged and sang this song a cappella with his new band at live concerts, one of which was recorded for a live album in 2000. Wilson visited Barenaked Ladies while they were recording Maroon (album producer Don Was was an associate of Brian Wilson's) whereupon they played him some of their works-in-progress, and then he played them his version of "Brian Wilson". At the end, he turned to them and asked, "Is it cool?" Upon his departure, his advice to the band was "don't eat too much." The band described the entire experience as surreal.

== Personnel ==
- Steven Page – acoustic guitar, lead vocals
- Ed Robertson – acoustic guitar, backing vocals
- Jim Creeggan – double bass, backing vocals
- Andy Creeggan – congas, backing vocals
- Tyler Stewart – drums

== Chart positions ==
Barenaked Ladies single

Chart (1993–1999)	Peak position
Canada Top Singles (RPM)	18
US Billboard Hot 100	68
US Adult Pop Airplay (Billboard)	37
US Alternative Airplay (Billboard)	23
UK Singles (Official Charts)	73
