= Jane (Barenaked Ladies song) =

1994 single by Barenaked Ladies

Single by Barenaked Ladies

from the album Maybe You Should Drive
- Released: October 11, 1994 (US)
- Length: 4:04
- Label: Sire; Reprise
- Songwriters: Stephen Duffy; Steven Page
- Producer: Ben Mink

Barenaked Ladies singles chronology
"If I Had $1000000" (1992)	"Jane" (1994)	"Alternative Girlfriend" (1995)

"Jane" is a song by Barenaked Ladies from their 1994 album Maybe You Should Drive. The song was written by Stephen Duffy and Steven Page. The single release included the album version of "Jane", a live version of "What a Good Boy", and the Buck Naked version of "Great Provider". "Jane" reached number three on Canada's RPM 100 Hit Tracks chart, topped the RPM Adult Contemporary Tracks chart for four weeks, and ended 1994 as the country's 17th-best-selling single. The song later appeared on their 2001 compilation Disc One: All Their Greatest Hits.

== Background ==
The title character is "Jane St. Clair", named after the intersection of Jane Street and St. Clair Avenue in Toronto. Steven Page recalls that co-writer Stephen Duffy saw the intersection on a map and remarked that it sounded like the most beautiful intersection in the world; Page "didn't wanna break his heart to tell him it wasn't." Page was also noted to have said, "the next song I'm gonna write is gonna be called Markham Ellesmere", the major suburban intersection of Markham Road and Ellesmere Road, which is close to where Page grew up in the Scarborough section of Toronto.

Page admits that the line "No Juliana next to my Evan" "dates [the song] a bit, [but] it still sounds pretty to me today."

== Personnel ==
- Steven Page – lead and backing vocals, acoustic guitar
- Ed Robertson – acoustic and electric guitars, backing vocals
- Jim Creeggan – electric bass, backing vocals
- Andy Creeggan – hammered dulcimer, backing vocals
- Tyler Stewart – drums

== Charts ==
=== Weekly charts ===
Chart (1994)	Peak position
Canada Top Singles (RPM)	3
Canada Adult Contemporary (RPM)	1

=== Year-end charts ===
Chart (1994)	Position
Canada Top Singles (RPM)	17
Canada Adult Contemporary (RPM)	15

== Release history ==
Region	Date	Format(s)	Label(s)	Ref.
United States	October 11, 1994	—N/a	Sire; Reprise	
Australia	October 31, 1994	Cassette	Sire; Reprise	
