= Be My Yoko Ono =

Single by Barenaked Ladies

from the album The Yellow Tape and Gordon
- Released: February 1992
- Recorded: 1991
- Genre: Alternative rock
- Length: 2:45
- Label: Page Publications, Reprise Records (US), Cheree Records (UK)
- Songwriters: Ed Robertson, Steven Page
- Producers: Barenaked Ladies, Scott Dibble, Everett Ravestein

Barenaked Ladies singles chronology
"Be My Yoko Ono" (1992)	"Lovers in a Dangerous Time" (1992)

Music video
- "Be My Yoko Ono" on YouTube

"Be My Yoko Ono" is the debut single by Canadian band Barenaked Ladies.

The song was written by Steven Page and Ed Robertson and first appeared on their 1989 demo tape, Buck Naked. It was also included on their second and third tapes, Barenaked Lunch and The Yellow Tape, as well as their major-label debut Gordon, and 2001 compilation, Disc One: All Their Greatest Hits.

== Background and content ==
In the song the narrator explains that he would be willing to give up everything to be with the person he loves by comparing their relationship to the one between Yoko Ono and John Lennon.

In 1991, the band entered the song in CFNY-FM's annual "Discovery to Disc" contest. When the station asked Steven Page for the master tape, he "didn't have the heart" to tell them that they already had it: a cassette that they had recorded in his basement. He told them that they would have it by next week, and submitted a studio re-recording within the week. This version of the song would later end up on The Yellow Tape, which achieved platinum status in Canada. The song became the band's first single and won the band the grand prize of $100,000 to record a full-length album, which became Gordon.

== Music video ==
The song was also the band's first "video"; in 1990, the band squeezed into Citytv's Speaker's Corner booth (which allows anyone to film a two-minute movie of themselves for one dollar) and performed a shortened version of "Be My Yoko Ono," with the introduction (as done by Steven Page) "Hi! We're Barenaked Ladies, and we're a little too cheap to make our own video so here you go." The clip, which was re-aired extensively, greatly popularized the band across Canada. Later, in 1993, a professional video, directed by Larry Jordan, was made. It features the band playing in a dark room and imitating many of Yoko Ono's avant-garde performance art pieces, including "Cut Piece" in which audience members used scissors to cut off her clothing until she was completely naked. The video is also interspersed with various film clips of Yoko and John, which she sent to the band herself after her son, Sean Lennon, who had seen the band perform, brought her a tape of the song.

The song was featured during a montage sequence in "The Cooper-Nowitzki Theorem", a second-season episode of The Big Bang Theory.

== Yoko Ono's reaction ==
In 1992, MuchMusic produced a television special about Barenaked Ladies to celebrate the release of Gordon. In the special, MuchMusic was able to interview Yoko Ono to gauge her reaction to the song. Ono said she enjoyed it, but that she liked "If I Had $1000000" more.

== Personnel ==
- Steven Page – lead vocals
- Ed Robertson – acoustic guitar, background vocals
- Andy Creeggan – congas, tambourine, background vocals
- Jim Creeggan – double bass, background vocals
- Tyler Stewart – drums
- Everett Ravenstein – engineering

== Charts ==
Chart (1992)	Peak position
Canadian Singles Chart	77
