= Enid (song) =

1992 single by Barenaked Ladies

Single by Barenaked Ladies

from the album Gordon
- Released: 1992
- Length: 4:07
- Label: Reprise
- Songwriters: Ed Robertson; Steven Page
- Producers: Barenaked Ladies; Michael Phillip Wojewoda

Barenaked Ladies singles chronology
"Lovers in a Dangerous Time" (1992)	"Enid" (1992)	"Grade 9" (1992)

Music video
- "Enid" on YouTube

"Enid" is a song by the Canadian alternative rock group Barenaked Ladies. It was written by Steven Page and Ed Robertson and released as the lead single from their 1992 debut album, Gordon. The song was successful in their home country, reaching number two on the RPM 100 Hit Tracks chart to become their highest-charting single until "It's All Been Done" reached number one in 1999. "Enid" was Canada's 28th-most-successful song of 1992.

== Background and content ==
The song's title was inspired by Enid Egers, a waitress at Spanky's Pub in Moncton, New Brunswick. The band found it interesting that "Enid" spelled backwards is "dine." Although she was the source of the title itself, the main thrust of the song is about Steven Page's first girlfriend.

The original studio version has been described as one of the most complex recordings of the band's earlier career by Steven Page in the liner notes for Disc One: All Their Greatest Hits. It includes a horn section, pedal steel guitar, a cuica and a pastiche of Depeche Mode as an intro (the voice in which is that of producer Michael Phillip Wojewoda).

== Music video ==
The music video was made in 1992 and was the band's second official video. It features the band playing in a room with a red-white-and-blue ball theme, similar to the Gordon cover. The band stated in Barelaked Nadies (probably jokingly) that the video was originally supposed to be a parody of the film Delicatessen. One of the video's gimmicks is that the film keeps cutting without the camera being moved, resulting in the band members disappearing and reappearing and moving around in shots. Also in the room are TV screens, showing the band playing in other locations, such as Kensington Market and St. James Park in Toronto. The song was nominated for Single of the Year at the 1993 Juno Awards, although it lost to "Beauty and the Beast" by Celine Dion and Peabo Bryson.

== Personnel ==
- Steven Page – lead vocals, moronic intro synth
- Ed Robertson – acoustic & electric guitars, bionic intro synth, backing vocals
- Jim Creeggan – double bass, backing vocals
- Andy Creeggan – cuíca, piano, backing vocals
- Tyler Stewart – drums
- Lewis Melville – pedal steel guitar
- Nic Gotham – baritone saxophone
- Gene Hardy – tenor saxophone
- Chris Howells – trumpet
- Tom Walsh – trombone
- Michael Phillip Wojewoda – tambourine, teutonic intro vocal

== Charts ==
=== Weekly charts ===
Chart (1992)	Peak position
Canada Top Singles (RPM)	2

=== Year-end charts ===
Chart (1992)	Position
Canada Top Singles (RPM)	28
