= Creeggan =

Creeggan is a surname. Notable people with the surname include:

- Andy Creeggan (born 1971), Canadian musician
- Jim Creeggan (born 1970), Canadian musician
