= What a Good Boy =

Single by Barenaked Ladies

from the album Gordon
- Released: 1993
- Recorded: 1992
- Genre: Alternative rock
- Length: 3:52
- Label: Reprise
- Songwriters: Steven Page and Ed Robertson

Barenaked Ladies singles chronology
| "Brian Wilson" (1993) | "What a Good Boy" (1993) | "Jane" (1994) |

Music video
- "What a Good Boy" on YouTube

"What a Good Boy" is a song from the Barenaked Ladies' 1992 debut album, Gordon. A live version of the song appeared on the 1994 single for "Jane". Another live version was later released on the live album Rock Spectacle. This version later appears on the compilation Disc One: All Their Greatest Hits. It was also included in the album Upfront! Canadians Live from Mountain Stage. The song was co-written by Steven Page and Ed Robertson.

The song is played during the end credits of the 1995 film Stonewall, and during the "Hate Crimes" episode of Homicide: Life on the Street.

== Personnel ==
- Steven Page – lead vocals, acoustic guitar
- Ed Robertson – acoustic guitar, background vocals
- Jim Creeggan – double bass
- Andy Creeggan – organ, piano
- Tyler Stewart – drums

== Charts ==
| Chart (1993) | Peak position |
|---|---|
| Canadian Singles Chart | 34 |
