= Rock Spectacle =

Live album by Barenaked Ladies
- Released: November 19, 1996
- Recorded: April 17, 1996; May 23, 1996
- Venue: Riviera Theatre, Chicago; Olympia, Montreal
- Genre: Alternative rock
- Length: 47:45
- Label: Reprise
- Producer: Michael Phillip Wojewoda

Barenaked Ladies chronology
Born on a Pirate Ship (1996)	Rock Spectacle (1996)	Stunt (1998)

Professional ratings
Review scores
Source	Rating
Allmusic	4/5 stars
Encyclopedia of Popular Music	3/5 stars
Entertainment Weekly	A
The Rolling Stone Album Guide	3.5/5 stars

Rock Spectacle is the first live album by Barenaked Ladies. It was also the first major success for the band in the United States, selling over one million copies and producing a hit single in the country in its version of "Brian Wilson." The album was recorded at two concerts: at the Riviera Theatre in Chicago and at The Olympia in Montreal during the Born on a Pirate Ship tour.

A live version of "Shoe Box" was on promotional and advance copies of this record, but was ultimately deleted. The recording would eventually be released on the "One Week" CD single. The album contains two bonus tracks. The first is a banter about an elderly woman Ed Robertson ran into in Chicago. The story is later referenced in "If I Had $1000000". The second is improvised banter about Robertson's Uncle Elwyn.

This disc is an enhanced CD, which means it will display special multimedia features when played on a computer. It includes a program called "BNLTV", a faux collection of various-themed TV programming.

== Commercial performance ==
By July 1998, Rock Spectacle had sold 775,000 copies in the United States and 80,000 copies in Canada. In September 1998, the album was certified Platinum in the United States.

== Track listing ==
All tracks are written by Steven Page and Ed Robertson, except where noted

No.	Title	Writer(s)	Lead vocals	Length
1.	"Brian Wilson"	Page	Steven Page	4:46
2.	"Straw Hat and Old Dirty Hank"		Steven Page	3:38
3.	"Break Your Heart"	Page	Steven Page	5:06
4.	"Jane"	Page; Stephen Duffy	Steven Page	3:58
5.	"When I Fall"		Ed Robertson	4:23
6.	"Hello City"		Steven Page	3:13
7.	"What a Good Boy"		Steven Page	4:47
8.	"The Old Apartment"		Steven Page	3:21
9.	"Life, in a Nutshell"		Steven Page	2:40
10.	"These Apples"	Robertson	Ed Robertson	3:59
11.	"Grade 9"/"If I Had $1000000"	Page; Robertson; Andy Creeggan; Jim Creeggan; Tyler Stewart	Steven Page; Ed Robertson	6:08
12.	"The Sweetest Woman (banter)" (hidden track)		Steven Page; Ed Robertson	1:09
13.	"Uncle Elwyn (banter)" (hidden track)		Steven Page; Ed Robertson	2:37

== Personnel ==
Barenaked Ladies

- Steven Page – vocals, acoustic guitar (1, 4, 7), electric guitar (8, 10)
- Ed Robertson – vocals, acoustic guitar (all except 3 and 8), electric guitar (3, 8)
- Jim Creeggan – double bass (all but 4), electric bass (4), backing vocals (1, 2, 4, 6, 9, 10, 11)
- Tyler Stewart – drums, backing vocals (8, 9, 11)
- Kevin Hearn – keyboards (all but 6), accordion (2, 6), electric guitar (on "Uncle Elwyn" adlib), backing vocals (4, 5, 6, 9, 11)

Production

- Engineers: Marcel Gounin, Michael Phillip Wojewoda
- Assistant engineers: Bernoit Baruvin, Dan Glomski, Mycle Konopka, Timothy R. Powell
- Mixing assistants: Jeff Elliot, Tom Heron
- Mastering: Don C. Tyler
- Digital editing: Jeff Elliot
- Design: Neil Prime
- Photography: Neil Prime

== Charts ==
=== Weekly charts ===
Chart (1996–1998)	Peak position
US Billboard 200	86
US Heatseekers Albums (Billboard)	1

=== Year-end charts ===
Chart (1998)	Position
US Billboard 200	132

=== Singles ===
Year	Single	Chart	Position
1997	"Brian Wilson"	Billboard Hot 100	68
1998	"Brian Wilson"	Adult Top 40	37
1998	"Brian Wilson"	Modern Rock	23
2000	"If I Had $1000000"	Adult Top 40	37

== Certifications ==
Region	Certification	Certified units/sales
United States (RIAA)	Platinum	1,000,000^{^}
^{^} Shipments figures based on certification alone.
