= Barenaked Ladies demo tapes =

The Canadian alternative rock band Barenaked Ladies released five demo tapes before being signed to Reprise Records.

== Buck Naked ==
Buck Naked

Demo album by Barenaked Ladies
- Released: 1988–1989
- Recorded: 1988–1989
- Genres: Indie rock; folk rock; lo-fi
- Length: various
- Label: John King Artist Consultants

Buck Naked is the Barenaked Ladies' first indie demo tape release, and featured only the original duo of Steven Page and Ed Robertson. The first known tape was released in 1988 (though most were released in 1989).

There are four known editions of this tape, each with different track listings. The earliest version, dating from "Fall 1988", features five songs. Its cover is different from later versions: It is green with the faces of Page and Robertson pasted onto photos of Terence Trent D'Arby. This edition of the tape is very rare.

The second, third and fourth editions feature a white cover with a black-and-white photo of Page and Robertson. The second edition has thirteen songs including a five-second outro track called "How's The Level?" The third and fourth editions added one and two additional songs respectively, with a reprise of "Road Runner" removed from the fourth edition. In all, somewhere between 150–600 copies of Buck Naked were made. It was recorded on a four-track recorder. The tapes were given to friends, and sold by the band off the stage.

The different editions feature songs which the band would eventually re-record for later releases. "Be My Yoko Ono" and "If I Had $1000000" would appear on The Yellow Tape and their first album Gordon (both eventually becoming hits). Also recorded for Gordon (as the so-called "naked track") was "The King Of Bedside Manor". "The Great Provider" would be recorded again for the band's second label album, Maybe You Should Drive, and the Bucknaked recording would appear on the "Jane" CD single in 1994. "Night Photographs" would be recorded for The Pink Tape and that recording, with the pitch corrected, would appear on The Ladies Room, Vol. 1 fan club CD single in 1997. "Trouble With Tracy" was performed live, with a live recording appearing as the B-side to the "Brian Wilson" single in 1993. "Road Runner" would be performed live as well, with a live version appearing on The Ladies Room, Vol. 7 fan club CD single in 2003.

The tape is credited for first getting the Barenaked Ladies noticed by college radio stations. Comedian-author Seán Cullen said the band gave him a tape at a Corky and the Juice Pigs show. Cullen recalled that he "listened to the tape and [...] quite liked it," with his favorite track being the band's cover version of Terence Trent D'Arby's "Wishing Well". Cullen subsequently invited the Barenaked Ladies to be the Juice Pigs' opening act for some local and regional college shows.

=== Track listing, green edition ===
All tracks are written by Steven Page and Ed Robertson, except where noted.

No.	Title	Lead vocals	Length
1.	"Road Runner" (Barbara Cameron)	Steven Page, Ed Robertson	1:35
2.	"Only You" (early version of what would later become "Lilac Girl")	Steven Page	3:07
3.	"Night Photographs"	Steven Page, Ed Robertson	2:59
4.	"Wishing Well" (Terence Trent D'Arby/Sean Oliver)	Steven Page	4:25
5.	"'Really Don't Know" (Steven Page)	Steven Page, Ed Robertson	3:56

The second side of the tape includes most of the songs from The Police 1980 album Zenyatta Mondatta.

=== Track listing, final black & white edition ===
All tracks are written by Steven Page and Ed Robertson, except where noted.

No.	Title	Lead vocals	Length
1.	"Road Runner" (Barbara Cameron)	Steven Page, Ed Robertson	1:35
2.	"Lilac Girl"	Steven Page	3:07
3.	"King of Bedside Manor"	Steven Page, Ed Robertson	3:03
4.	"The Trouble with Tracy"	Steven Page	2:55
5.	"Great Provider"	Ed Robertson	3:39
6.	"Night Photographs"	Steven Page, Ed Robertson	2:59
7.	"Make My Heart Fly" (Charlie Reid, Craig Reid)	Steven Page, Ed Robertson	1:38
8.	"'Really Don't Know" (Steven Page, Geoff Pounsett)	Steven Page, Ed Robertson	3:56
9.	"Be My Yoko Ono"	Steven Page	3:49
10.	"Psycho Killer" (David Byrne, Chris Frantz, Tina Weymouth)	Ed Robertson	4:01
11.	"Rudi, A Message To You" (Dandy Livingstone)	Steven Page	2:48
12.	"If I Had $1,000,000"	Steven Page, Ed Robertson	3:36
13.	"Wishing Well" (Terence Trent D'Arby, Sean Oliver)	Steven Page	4:25
14.	"Careless"	Steven Page, Ed Robertson	4:13
15.	"How's the Level?"	Steven Page	0:06

== Barenaked Lunch (The Pink Tape) ==
Barenaked Lunch (The Pink Tape)

EP by Barenaked Ladies
- Released: 1990
- Recorded: 1990
- Genres: Indie rock; folk rock; lo-fi
- Length: 14:17
- Label: Page Publications
- Producer: Barenaked Ladies

Barenaked Lunch (often referred to as The Pink Tape) is the Barenaked Ladies second indie tape release. The title is a pun on the novel Naked Lunch by William S. Burroughs.

This was the first tape recorded with bassist Jim Creeggan and percussionist Andy Creeggan, whose additions expanded the Barenaked Ladies to a quartet. The tape was recorded as a demo tape in 1990 and is also known as the Pink Tape. About 2,000 tapes were produced but were mastered incorrectly, with the songs playing too fast.

Mitch Potter of Toronto Star wrote that Barenaked Lunch, along with the band's first tape Buck Naked, "overflow with boyish charm, brisk wit and clean, melodic harmonies worthy in and of themselves." Potter added that, "'(You Can) Be My Yoko Ono' and 'If I Had $1000000', riddled with barbed one-liners, leave you in quiet reflection after the laughing stops, while 'Blame It On Me' indicates the songwriting duo is capable of losing the smirk without losing focus." Potter called "Be My Yoko Ono" a "weepy love ballad" whose satire contains "nary a trace of the malice John [Lennon]'s widow draws from virtually every direction," and described "If I Had $1000000" as a "warmly comic comeuppance on the quest for the almighty buck that has the pair trading drop-dead one-liners at the end of each plaintive refrain."

A December 1991 Toronto Star article remarked that twelve months earlier, Barenaked Ladies "were virtual unknowns. Today, they're one of Canada's most popular acts. Think how far they would have gone with songs like 'Be My Yoko Ono' if this indie cassette EP had been a real album, with big-money marketing behind it."

=== Track listing ===
All tracks are written by Steven Page and Ed Robertson.

No.	Title	Lead vocals	Length
1.	"Night Photographs"	Steven Page, Ed Robertson	2:03
2.	"The Trouble with Tracy"	Steven Page	2:32
3.	"Blame It On Me"	Steven Page	3:28
4.	"Be My Yoko Ono"	Steven Page, Ed Robertson	2:54
5.	"If I Had $1,000,000"	Steven Page, Ed Robertson	3:24

== Barenaked Recess ==
Barenaked Recess

EP by Barenaked Ladies
- Released: Unreleased
- Recorded: Early 1990
- Genres: Indie rock; folk rock; lo-fi
- Length: 28:35
- Label: Page Publications
- Producer: Barenaked Ladies

Barenaked Recess is the Barenaked Ladies' third indie tape. Unlike the others, however, this tape was never released for unknown reasons. Allegedly less than six copies were made. A rumour among fans alleges that Ed Robertson kept the tapes under his bed, although it was never proven nor debunked. A copy of the tape was leaked to the internet in March 2010 by an unknown source. The torrent containing the tape contains "Blame it on Me", which is identical to the recording from Barenaked Lunch (a.k.a. The Pink Tape). This, along with owners of the original tape claiming it is not on their copy, reveals that "Blame it on Me" was probably added in on a second generation copy. The tape includes the debut of songs such as "Brian Wilson", "The Flag", and "Crazy" which were later featured on Gordon, along with unreleased songs such as "Skinhead", and covers of "Material Girl" and "When Doves Cry". The artwork of this tape has never been revealed.

All tracks are written by Steven Page and Ed Robertson, except where noted.

No.	Title	Lead vocals	Length
1.	"Brian Wilson" (Steven Page)	Steven Page	5:00
2.	"Hello City"	Steven Page	2:58
3.	"Skinhead"	Steven Page	3:23
4.	"The Flag"	Steven Page	3:27
5.	"Lilac Girl"	Steven Page	3:16
6.	"When Doves Cry" (Prince)	Steven Page, Ed Robertson	2:26
7.	"Material Girl" (Peter Brown, Robert Rans)	Steven Page, Ed Robertson	3:03
8.	"Crazy" (Ed Robertson, Tim Wilson)	Ed Robertson	2:36
9.	"Blame It On Me"	Steven Page	3:31

== Barenaked Ladies (The Yellow Tape) ==
Barenaked Ladies (The Yellow Tape)

EP by Barenaked Ladies
- Released: 1991
- Recorded: 1991
- Genres: College rock; indie rock
- Length: 16:59
- Label: Page Publications
- Producer: Barenaked Ladies

The Yellow Tape is the Barenaked Ladies' fourth indie tape release. It was recorded in 1991 at Wellesley Sound in Toronto (except for "Be My Yoko Ono", which had been recorded earlier at Number 9 Studios). It was the band's first release to feature drummer Tyler Stewart. The tape, as with Barenaked Lunch, was released on Page's father's label Page Publications.

It was originally recorded as a demo for the band's performance at South by Southwest. The Yellow Tape sold more than 85,000 copies and became the first independent release be certified platinum in Canada. Although officially self-titled, it is commonly referred to as The Yellow Tape, due to its yellow cover.

It was re-released by Cheree Records in CD and vinyl record formats as Barenaked Ladies in the United Kingdom. The UK release dropped the track "Fight the Power".

Early copies of the tape include an error in the J-card notes: drummer Tyler Stewart's name is misspelled as "Steward." It also includes a different address for the band's management.

In 1995, the band's Shoe Box E.P. single featured this recording of "If I Had $1000000", listed officially as "Yellow Tape Version," indicating the band themselves refer to this release by its common name.

=== Track listing ===
All tracks are written by Steven Page and Ed Robertson, except where noted.

No.	Title	Lead vocals	Length
1.	"Be My Yoko Ono"	Steven Page	2:59
2.	"Brian Wilson" (Steven Page)	Steven Page	4:49
3.	"Blame It on Me"	Steven Page	3:49
4.	"If I Had $1000000"	Steven Page, Ed Robertson	3:49
5.	"Fight the Power" (Chuck D, Eric Sadler, Keith Shocklee, Hank Shocklee)	Steven Page, Ed Robertson	1:33

== Variety Recordings: Barenaked Ladies ==
Variety Recordings: Barenaked Ladies

EP by Barenaked Ladies
- Released: 1991
- Recorded: August 1991
- Genres: College rock, indie rock
- Length: 25:31
- Label: Canadian Broadcasting Corporation
- Producer: Barenaked Ladies

Barenaked Ladies chronology
The Yellow Tape (1991)	Variety Recordings: Barenaked Ladies (1991)	Gordon (1992)

Variety Recordings: Barenaked Ladies is the Barenaked Ladies fifth indie release, issued only to Canadian radio stations. The cover art utilized tan paper with purple ink and a close-up of Steven Page's legs.

All tracks are written by Steven Page and Ed Robertson, except where noted.

No.	Title	Lead vocals	Length
1.	"New Kid (on the Block)" (Scott Dibble, Steven Page, Ed Robertson)	Steven Page	4:13
2.	"Wrap Your Arms Around Me"	Ed Robertson	3:07
3.	"Blame It on Me"	Steven Page	3:46
4.	"If I Had $1000000"	Steven Page, Ed Robertson	4:25
5.	"Crazy" (Ed Robertson, Tim Wilson)	Ed Robertson	2:34
6.	"The Flag" (Steven Page)	Steven Page	3:25
7.	"Hello City"	Steven Page	3:19
