= Pink Tape =

Pink Tape may refer to:

- Pink Tape (f(x) album), 2013
- Pink Tape (Lil Uzi Vert album), 2023
- Barenaked Lunch (The Pink Tape), a demo tape by Barenaked Ladies, 1990
- The Pink Tape, a demo tape by Engerica, 2000/2001
