= The Brothers Creeggan =

Canadian alternative rock/jazz band

- Origin: Toronto, Ontario, Canada
- Genres: Alternative rock, jazz
- Years active: 1992-2003
- Members: Andy Creeggan; Jim Creeggan; Ian McLauchlan

The Brothers Creeggan was a Canadian alternative rock/jazz band composed of Jim Creeggan (upright bass, guitar, bass guitar, vocals), Andy Creeggan (guitar, piano, accordion, percussion, vocals) and Ian McLauchlan (drums). The group has released four albums: The Brothers Creeggan (1993), The Brothers Creeggan II (1997), Trunks (2000) and Sleepyhead (2002).

== Biography ==
Growing up in Toronto, brothers Jim and Andy Creeggan started in music by recording cover songs of James Brown and George Thorogood on a rented 4-track. As teenagers, the pair performed in several groups, including the Synthetics, an a cappella quartet that won a 1987 Canadian talent contest in which Alanis Morissette was runner-up. The brothers went on to become founding members of Barenaked Ladies. Andy left Barenaked Ladies in 1995 to pursue a musical composition degree at McGill University, while Jim continued as the band's bassist.

The Brothers Creeggan released their self-titled debut album in 1993. The song "Places" features backing vocals by Alanis Morissette. The album "was almost a demo thing," according to Andy. "We finished it up and sent it to some friends." A second album, The Brothers Creeggan II, followed in 1997. Three years later, the duo added a third member, drummer Ian McLauchlan, and released their third album, Trunks. Andy said the album was "definitely a natural evolution from the first two albums," as the songs on Trunks "were more accessible and more continuous to each other." Jane Stevenson of Jam! called the album "a delicate and sweet-sounding effort that combines the best of folk and jazz with gentle lead vocals from both Jim and Andy." Allmusic's Theresa E. LaVeck described it as "an extended evening lullaby: soft, sweet, and sleepy (think Simon & Garfunkel lite)."

The group's fourth album, Sleepyhead, was released on Nettwerk in 2002. Barenaked Ladies member Ed Robertson and singer-songwriter Sarah Harmer guest on album track "Anna on the Moon". Tom Semioli of Allmusic said that with the album, "the Brothers Creeggan have slipped a contemplative masterpiece into our midst."

The band went on hiatus in 2003. Jim stayed with the Barenaked Ladies; Andy went on to a solo career. On 13 July 2009, drummer Ian McLauchlan died of complications following heart surgery.

== Discography ==
Title	Release date
The Brothers Creeggan	1995
The Brothers Creeggan II	October 1997
Trunks	18 January 2000
Sleepyhead	2002
