= The Old Apartment =

1996 single by Barenaked Ladies

Single by Barenaked Ladies

from the album Born on a Pirate Ship
- Released: 1996
- Genre: Alternative rock
- Length: 3:36
- Label: Reprise
- Songwriters: Steven Page; Ed Robertson
- Producers: Barenaked Ladies; Michael Phillip Wojewoda

Barenaked Ladies singles chronology
"If I Had $1000000" (1996)	"The Old Apartment" (1996)	"Brian Wilson (2000)" (1997)

Music video
- "The Old Apartment" on YouTube

"The Old Apartment" is a song by the Canadian alternative rock group Barenaked Ladies. It was the band's first entry on the US Billboard Hot 100, appearing on the albums Born on a Pirate Ship, Rock Spectacle and Disc One: All Their Greatest Hits. The music video for the song, which garnered a Best Director nomination at the 1997 MuchMusic Video Awards, was directed by fellow Canadian and fan Jason Priestley at his own suggestion.

== Composition ==
Steven Page has said the song was partly inspired by "Back to the Old House" by the Smiths. While some have misinterpreted the lyrics to mean that the man in the song is stalking an ex-girlfriend and breaks into her apartment to terrorize her, Ed Robertson has said that this is definitely not the case. The person in the song and his girlfriend are still together and happy, having "bought an old house on the Danforth" (Danforth Avenue in Toronto). However, he goes back to visit "the old apartment" "where we used to live", and winds up breaking in to reminisce. Although recalling "broken glass", the "crooked landing, crooked landlord", and other disadvantages, he nonetheless feels nostalgia for "fading memories / blending into dull tableaux".

The song drew a notable level of attention in the U.S. Priestley also invited the band to play the song at the fictional night club "The Peach Pit After Dark" on his series Beverly Hills, 90210. With some isolated exceptions, this was the band's first break into the American market, which continued with their next release, a live version of "Brian Wilson" from the certified-gold album Rock Spectacle. The live version of "The Old Apartment" from that album was included on later American radio singles as a B-side option for stations.

The studio version of the song has two main versions: the original album version and a radio mix, which was a completely new mix of the song. Notable differences in the radio mix, besides a completely new audio mix, include an 8-bar instrumental intro and in Page's noticeably filtered vocal bridge. A 1995 demo version also appears on the compilation album Stop Us If You've Heard This One Before.

Apple Inc. included the music video on the Mac OS 8 installation CD as a QuickTime example.

New band member Kevin Hearn appeared in the music video despite not being present on the studio recording.

== Personnel ==
- Steven Page – lead vocals, electric guitar
- Ed Robertson – electric and pedal steel guitars, background vocals
- Jim Creeggan – electric upright bass
- Tyler Stewart – drums, shaker, background vocals
- Gene Hardy – musical saw

== Charts ==
Chart (1996–1997)	Peak position
Canada Top Singles (RPM)	14
Canada Adult Contemporary (RPM)	32
US Billboard Hot 100	88
US Pop Airplay (Billboard)	40

== Release history ==
Region	Date	Format(s)	Label(s)	Ref.
Canada	1996	Radio	Reprise	
United States	January 28, 1997	Contemporary hit radio	Reprise	
