= Gordon (album) =

Studio album by Barenaked Ladies
- Released: July 28, 1992
- Recorded: 1992
- Studios: Le Studio, Morin-Heights, Quebec
- Genres: Alternative rock; college rock; folk rock; comedy rock
- Length: 59:15
- Label: Reprise/Sire
- Producer: Michael Phillip Wojewoda

Barenaked Ladies chronology
Variety Recordings (1991)	Gordon (1992)	Maybe You Should Drive (1994)

Original cover
- Cover from original release

Gordon is the debut studio album by Canadian band Barenaked Ladies. It was released through Sire Records on July 28, 1992.

After their self-released The Yellow Tape was certified platinum in Canada, the group won a contest hosted by a local radio station. With the winnings, Barenaked Ladies were able to hire producer Michael Phillip Wojewoda and record the album at Le Studio, north of Montreal, Quebec, Chalet Recording Studios, and Reaction Studios (both in Ontario). Though most of the album was recorded without incident, difficulty with "The King of Bedside Manor" caused the band to record the track naked—a tradition they would continue on other albums. Horn parts, guest vocalists, and nods to other bands including Rush allowed Barenaked Ladies to expand on the sound they had developed while touring. "They had a real clarity about what they wanted [the album] to be ... I just captured what it is they do", said Wojewoda.

== Background and recording ==
In 1991, after the gold certification of The Yellow Tape—an independently recorded and manufactured cassette—Barenaked Ladies won Discovery to Disc, a contest hosted by CFNY-FM, a Toronto-based rock radio station. With the prize winnings of $100,000, the band hired Michael Phillip Wojewoda to produce the album. Wojewoda felt the band had potential, specifically demonstrated with the track "The Flag", "there was definitely some wisdom in their young years." To get better acquainted with the band Wojewoda invited Barenaked Ladies to sing back-up vocals for "California Dreamline" during the recording of Rheostatics's Whale Music. While in the studio the band met Rush drummer Neil Peart, who had influenced some of the Barenaked Ladies. The band selected 14 songs out of 20 candidates that they had written to record in the studio. "[T]hey didn't need a lot of shaping. It was ... a matter of shifting through a lot of great moments and finding the ones which fit best on the record", said Wojewoda. With the tracks selected, Wojewoda and the band drove to Le Studio. The band worked on the album for ten- to twelve-hour sessions each day, with little conflict among members. At night the band would commute to their house by skiing in the moonlight.

After some difficulty recording "The King of Bedside Manor", it was suggested that the band members record the song naked. Wojewoda and engineer Jean Diamont were also required to remove their clothes; said Wojewoda, "I think the recording has this totally over-the-top nervous energy as a result of being naked." Led by Jim and Andy Creeggan, the band developed horn parts for "Enid", "Wrap Your Arms Around Me", and "Box Set". Guest musicians are used throughout the album including Lewis Melville, Chris Brown, and members of the Bourbon Tabernacle Choir. "I don't think there're many musicians from Toronto who aren't on Gordon", said Brown. The album was mixed in March 1992. Before the album's release, Sire Records had to receive clearance from various parties for music that Barenaked Ladies had included on various tracks of Gordon. Having developed the songs during live performances, Barenaked Ladies integrated themes from Styx, Rush, The Housemartins, and Vince Guaraldi into various tracks.

== Artwork ==
Two covers of this album were released. The original 1992 cover features all five band members amongst large grey letters which spell "Gordon." The band's name appears in front of a red and blue ball with a stripe on it. When Reprise Records reissued the album in 1996, a new cover was made, which features a similar ball as seen on the original cover in front of an indigo background with black stripes. The band's name is written above the ball on this cover and the album's title is featured below the ball. The original artwork is featured on the top right of the back cover of the 1996 version. Both versions feature a disc stylized to look like the ball seen on both releases. In a 2012 interview with National Post, the band admitted that they never liked the original cover, with Tyler Stewart calling it "the worst album cover in the history of music".

The original cover is restored on the 2017 vinyl release, but the band members are edited out.

== Reception ==
Professional ratings
Review scores
Source	Rating
AllMusic	4/5 stars
The Encyclopedia of Popular Music	4/5 stars
The Rolling Stone Album Guide	3/5 stars
Select	2/5 medals

Jon Pareles of The New York Times wrote, "It's not easy to be hyperactive, brooding, and whimsical all at once, but the Barenaked Ladies do just that." MacKenzie Wilson of AllMusic wrote that the album approaches, but does not cross the "boundaries of silliness." She went on to call the "shared vocals ... refreshing and upbeat", concluding that "Gordon is a great introduction to the Barenaked Ladies' sweet comic relief". The Miami Herald called the album "funny and punny, more inventive than you might expect", stating that "it switches directions on you just when you're least expecting it".

Gordon sold 80,000 copies in Canada during its first 24 hours of release, topping the Canadian charts for eight consecutive weeks. In the United States, initial album sales were stronger in larger cities, however, a spike in sales was not seen until the releases of Rock Spectacle and "One Week". Gordon was certified Gold by the Recording Industry Association of America in August 1998. According to Steven Page, the number of "fans who know every word of every song" outnumbers the number of units sold by four times. "Gordon must be the most bootlegged album in [United States] history", said Page. In 2000, the album achieved diamond status in Canada, selling over one million copies.

== Track listing ==
All tracks are written by Steven Page and Ed Robertson, except where noted.

No.	Title	Writer(s)	Lead vocals	Length
1.	"Hello City"		Steven Page; Ed Robertson	3:22
2.	"Enid"		Steven Page	4:07
3.	"Grade 9"	Page; Robertson; Andy Creeggan; Jim Creeggan; Tyler Stewart	Steven Page; Ed Robertson	2:53
4.	"Brian Wilson"	Page	Steven Page	4:47
5.	"Be My Yoko Ono"		Steven Page; Ed Robertson	2:45
6.	"Wrap Your Arms Around Me"	Page; Robertson; J. Creeggan	Ed Robertson	4:35
7.	"What a Good Boy"		Steven Page	3:52
8.	"The King of Bedside Manor"		Steven Page; Ed Robertson	2:24
9.	"Box Set"	Page	Steven Page	4:48
10.	"I Love You"	Page; Robertson; A. Creeggan; J. Creeggan	Steven Page; Ed Robertson; Andy Creeggan; Jim Creeggan	4:08
11.	"New Kid (On the Block)"	Page; Robertson; Scott Dibble	Steven Page	4:13
12.	"Blame It on Me"		Steven Page; Ed Robertson	3:54
13.	"The Flag"	Page	Steven Page	3:53
14.	"If I Had $1000000"		Steven Page; Ed Robertson	4:27
15.	"Crazy"	Robertson; Tim Wilson	Ed Robertson	4:08
16.	"Dat Fodder" (hidden track)			0:38

== Note ==
- "Hello City" is from Barenaked Recess.
- "Wrap Your Arms Around Me", & "New Kid (On the Block)" are from Variety Recordings.
- "The King of Bedside Manor" is from Buck Naked (4th edition).
- "Blame It on Me" is from most demo tapes other than all Buck Naked editions.
- "The Flag", & "Crazy" are from Barenaked Recess, & Variety Recordings.

== Personnel ==
Barenaked Ladies

- Steven Page – vocals (all tracks), guitar (tracks 4, 7, 8), shaker (track 8), wat-ups (track 1), moronic intro synth (track 2), cartoon noises (track 8), secret noises (track 15)
- Ed Robertson – guitar (all tracks), vocals (all tracks), shaker (track 8), cowbell (track 9), bionic intro synth (track 2), crowd noise (track 3), funky mouth (track 3)
- Jim Creeggan – double bass (tracks 1–12, 14–15), arco double bass (track 13), vocals (tracks 1–6, 8, 9, 10, 12–15), shaker (track 8), secret noises (track 15)
- Andy Creeggan – organ (tracks 3, 7), piano (tracks 1–3, 7, 9–11, 14–15), conga (tracks 1, 4, 5, 8, 9, 11, 12), tambourine (tracks 5, 6, 8) triangle (track 6), vocals (tracks 1–6, 8–15), Claves (track 9), cuíca (track 2), shaker (tracks 6, 8, 11, 12), mark tree (track 6), güiro (track 9), finger cymbals (track 6), cabasa (track 6), vibraphone (track 9), scat (track 10), wat'ups (track 1), marimba (track 12), mbira (track 12), suitcase (track 13), secret noises (track 15)
- Tyler Stewart – drums (tracks 1–12, 14, 15), vocals (tracks 3, 8), shaker (track 8), wat'ups (track 1), bass drum (track 13), snare drum (track 13)

The Jimmy Crack Horns (track 2)

- Nic Gotham – baritone saxophone
- Gene Hardy – tenor saxophone
- Chris Howells – trumpet
- Tom Walsh – trombone

The Horn Cuskers (track 9)

- Nic Gotham – alto saxophone, baritone saxophone
- Gene Hardy – tenor saxophone

Additional Personnel

- Dave Allen – fiddle (track 14)
- Chris Brown – organ (track 10)
- Chris Howells – flugelhorn (track 6)
- Catherine MacDonnell-Stephens – bassoon (track 6)
- Lewis Melville – pedal steel guitar (tracks 2, 6, 11, 14)
- Martin Tielli – guitar solo (track 15)
- Tom Walsh – trombone (track 1)
- Tim Wilson – bagpipes (track 15)
- Bob Wiseman – accordion (track 14)
- Michael Phillip Wojewoda – tambourine (track 2), Teutonic intro vocal (track 2), shaker (track 8), stupid keyboard bass (track 3), secret noises (track 15)

Production

- Michael-Philip Wojewoda – Producer, Engineer, Remixing
- Greg Calbi – Mastering

The Suburban Tabernacle Choir (track 14)

- Dave Allen
- Mike Barber
- Gregor Beresford
- Arlene Bishop
- Chris Brown
- Erica Buss
- Meryn Cadell
- Naida Creeggan
- Matthew DeMatteo
- Kate Fenner
- Gene Hardy
- Natalie Herbert
- Shelley Hines
- Sally Lee
- Lewis Melville
- Jason Mercer
- Janet Morassutti
- Moxy Früvous
- Keith Nakonechny
- Blair Packham
- Matthew Page
- Steve Pitkin
- Jason Plumb
- Rheostatics
- Wilma Robertson
- Tannis Slimmon
- Earl Stokes
- Wayne Stokes
- Bob Wiseman

== Charts ==
Album

Year	Chart	Position
1992	Canadian Albums Chart	1

Singles

Year	Single	Chart	Position
1992	"Be My Yoko Ono"	Canadian Singles Chart	77
1992	"Enid"	Canadian Singles Chart	2
1992	"Grade 9"	Canadian Singles Chart	53
1992	"If I Had $1,000,000"	Canadian Singles Chart	13
1993	"Brian Wilson"	Canadian Singles Chart	18
1993	"What a Good Boy"	Canadian Singles Chart	34

== Certifications ==
Certifications for "Gordon"
Region	Certification	Certified units/sales
Canada (Music Canada)	Diamond	1,000,000^{^}
United States (RIAA)	Gold	500,000^{^}
^{^} Shipments figures based on certification alone.
