= If I Had $1000000 =

1992 single by Barenaked Ladies

Single by Barenaked Ladies

from the album Gordon
- Released: December 1992
- Length: 4:27
- Label: Reprise
- Songwriters: Steven Page; Ed Robertson
- Producers: Barenaked Ladies; Michael Phillip Wojewoda

Barenaked Ladies singles chronology
"Grade 9" (1992)	"If I Had $1000000" (1992)	"Brian Wilson" (1993)
"Shoe Box" (1995)	"If I Had $1000000" (1996)	"The Old Apartment" (1997)

Alternative cover
- 1996 cover

"If I Had $1000000" is a song by the Canadian musical group Barenaked Ladies from their album Gordon. Composed by founding members Steven Page and Ed Robertson, the sing-along track has become a live show staple for the band. It reached number 13 in Canada and eventually charted in the United Kingdom and the United States, peaking also at number 13 on the UK Rock Chart in 1996, as well as number 37 on the US Billboard Adult Top 40 in 2000.

== History ==
The song first appeared on one of the later versions of the band's first independent release, Buck Naked. The song subsequently appeared on their second and third tapes, Barenaked Lunch, and The Yellow Tape, as well as their 1991 extended play (EP) Variety Recordings. In 1991, the song began getting lots of airplay on Toronto radio station CFNY-FM. The song was then released on the band's debut album, Gordon, which would go on to sell over a million copies in Canada. The song has remained very popular and well known since then. An edited version of the Gordon recording of the song later appeared as a bonus track on the UK edition of Born on a Pirate Ship (this version was later released as a single), and a live version of it was featured on Rock Spectacle. The Gordon version was then included on Disc One: All Their Greatest Hits, bringing the total album count for the song to eight.

"If I Had $1000000" gained popularity over the course of the band's early tours, before the release of their first album (Gordon) and became highly requested on radio stations in Canada following the release of Gordon. This prompted the band's label to release a one-track radio single of the song in December 1992. In 1993, the song would be officially released as a commercial single in the UK; a second commercial single was released there in 1996. Another radio single containing the Gordon and Rock Spectacle versions of the song was released in North America later. Despite these releases, the song is often not considered a true single, since it gained popularity before the release of a radio single, and it never had a music video (although stations such has MuchMoreMusic and MuchMoreRetro have occasionally aired a 1992 performance from Intimate and Interactive as a video).

"If I Had $1000000" is one of the earliest-composed Barenaked Ladies songs. It was first conceived as a simple improvised song while Page and Robertson were counsellors at a summer music camp. On the way home from camp, Robertson played the tune for the campers, randomly listing amusing things he would buy with a million dollars. Upon returning to camp, he brought the idea to Page, and the two fleshed out the song. The song has become an icon of Canadian culture, reflecting sentiments on Canadians who wish to win a large lottery prize. In 2005, the song's popularity to people of all ages caused it to be placed at No. 2 in the list of Top 50 Essential Canadian Tracks, aired on CBC Radio.

=== Métis concert protest ===
In 1993, it was reported that a group of Métis planned to boycott and picket the Barenaked Ladies' concert in Yellowknife due to their objection to the "I would buy you a fur coat, but not a real fur coat that's cruel" line in "If I Had $1000000". The group objected to the line because many northern Métis earned a living from fur trapping and felt that the line painted them in an unfair light. In response, the band released a statement on the issue:

"We believe that everybody should be able to make their own ethical decision on how they feel about fur. Although the line in question was originally intended as a satire of knee-jerk reactions to such broad debates, we are aware of the complexities of the fur issue. We understand that fur has played a major role in our country's heritage and that it is still a vital facet of many people's livelihoods and traditions. All members of our band do eat meat and wear leather, however our personal choice is to draw the line at fur, especially as a statement of wealth."

== Structure ==
While hinting at romantic intentions, the lyrics offer eccentric ideas about purchases one would make with a million dollars. The protagonist suggests all the things he would buy for his sweetheart were he a millionaire. Ed Robertson and Steven Page share the vocals: in the verses, it is a call-and-response vocal with Page responding to the lines Robertson starts; in the choruses, Robertson and the rest of the band repeat the harmonized title line while Page responds to the line with further spending ideas.

A trademark of the song developed early on: After each of the first two choruses of the song, the vocals break down into a free-form banter. On each of the song's first three indie cassette appearances (Buck Naked, the Pink Tape and the Yellow Tape), the banter between Page and Robertson lasts only in the remainder of the bar after the last line of the chorus. On Buck Naked, the second banter is followed by an instrumental interlude.

The dialogues became improvisational for Page and Robertson at live shows. When it came time to record Gordon, recognizing that spontaneity in these banters would be vital to the song, the band chose to record a different take of this song each day, with the best one chosen for the album. In live performances, it became traditional for Page and Robertson to improvise entirely new dialogue at these points. Initially the subject tended to flow from the previous sung lyric (a fridge in a treefort after the first chorus, and Kraft Dinner after the second chorus); with time this grew less common, and evolved into one of the two lead singers telling an unrelated anecdote. Since Page's departure from the band in February 2009, keyboardist Kevin Hearn has filled his singing role in concert and all of the remaining band members have picked up some of the bantering with Robertson.

Some of the purchases are humorous references to the lavish spending of pop star Michael Jackson during the 1980s, specifically exotic animals, (an attempt to purchase) the remains of the "Elephant Man", and a pet monkey. For an awards ceremony, Jackson bought Elizabeth Taylor, his friend, a sparkling emerald green dress ('not real emeralds').

The line "but not a real green dress that's cruel" was originally written as "with a tastefully rounded neck". Page incorrectly sang the "cruel" lyric in the studio as a joke, which Robertson found so funny that the rest of the band decided to leave it in the finished song.

=== Kraft Dinner ===
A line in the song inspired fans to begin throwing packages of Kraft Dinner at the band during concerts. The tradition began with a single box thrown onstage during a 1991 show at the Danforth Music Hall in Toronto. It quickly grew by word-of-mouth, and the number of boxes being thrown rapidly increased. Eventually, hundreds of boxes would be thrown at a typical show, often targeting the band and their instruments. The packets of cheese powder included in the boxes sometimes burst open, resulting in a putrid odor when they were exposed to the heat of the stage lights, and some fans even threw cooked pasta. The band ultimately requested that their audiences end the tradition and instead donate the boxes to their local food banks, using bins set up in the venue lobby for this purpose.

== Legacy ==
The song became an ice cream flavour in May 2009 when the band partnered with American ice cream company Ben & Jerry's to create "If I Had 1,000,000 Flavours". The confection consists of vanilla and chocolate ice cream, peanut butter cups, chocolate-coated toffee chunks, white chocolate chunks and chocolate-coated almonds. The band became the first Canadian band to receive their own ice cream flavour, following in the footsteps of other band-themed Ben & Jerry's flavours such as Cherry Garcia (Jerry Garcia), One Sweet Whirled (Dave Matthews Band) and Phish Food (Phish). All royalties from the sale of "If I Had 1,000,000 Flavours" are donated to the ABC Canada Literacy Foundation, a Toronto-based organization that promotes reading to children at home.

== Track listings ==
Tracks for the two commercial UK singles:

1993

1. "If I Had $1000000" – 4:27
2. "Grade 9" (Live) – 3:07
3. "Crazy" – 4:06

1996

1. "If I Had $1000000" (UK edit) – 4:15
2. "Trust Me" – 2:48
3. "Shoe Box" (Radio Remix) – 3:09

== Personnel ==
- Ed Robertson – co-lead vocal, acoustic guitar
- Steven Page – co-lead vocal
- Jim Creeggan – double bass, backing vocals
- Andy Creeggan – piano, backing vocals
- Tyler Stewart – drums, choir
- Bob Wiseman – accordion, choir
- Dave Allen – fiddle, choir
- Lewis Melville – pedal steel guitar, choir
- The Suburban Tabernacle Choir:
  - Arlene Bishop
  - Blair Packham
  - Chris Brown
  - Dave Clark
  - Earl Stokes
  - Erica Buss
  - Gene Hardy
  - Gregor Beresford
  - Janet Morassutti
  - Jason Mercer
  - Jason Plumb
  - Jo-Anne Page
  - Kate Fenner
  - Keith Nakonechny
  - Martin Tielli
  - Matthew DeMatteo
  - Matthew Page
  - Meryn Cadell
  - Mike Barber
  - Moxy Früvous
    - Dave Matheson
    - Jian Ghomeshi
    - Mike Ford
    - Murray Foster
  - Naida Creeggan
  - Natalie Harbert
  - Sally Lee
  - Shelley Hines
  - Steven Pitkin
  - Tannis Slimmon
  - Tim Vesely
  - Veteran Warhorse

== Charts ==
Chart (1992–2000)	Peak position
Canada Top Singles (RPM)	13
UK Rock & Metal (Official Charts)	13
US Adult Pop Airplay (Billboard)	37
