= Shoe Box =

Single by Barenaked Ladies

from the album Born on a Pirate Ship and Friends Original TV Soundtrack
- Released: 1995
- Recorded: 1995
- Genre: Alternative rock
- Length: 3:10
- Label: Reprise
- Producers: Barenaked Ladies, Michael Phillip Wojewoda

Barenaked Ladies singles chronology
"Alternative Girlfriend" (1994)	"Shoe Box" (1995)	"If I Had $1000000" (1996)

Music video
- "Shoe Box" on YouTube

"Shoe Box" is a song by Canadian band Barenaked Ladies, released as a single from their 1996 album, Born on a Pirate Ship. It is notable for being featured on the first soundtrack to the television series Friends, as well as the last track on the band's 1996 Born on a Pirate Ship album (added at the last minute). The song was also recorded and mixed for the band's live album, Rock Spectacle, but was ultimately left off, and later included on the single release of "One Week" in 1998.

== Music video ==
The video for the song was originally to feature Matt LeBlanc and Lisa Kudrow, from the sitcom Friends, but each pulled out nearly last minute, and had to be replaced with unknown actors. According to the commentary track on the film Barelaked Nadies, the male actor was Chris Hardwick, who later became famous for his work with Nerdist Industries. The video features a young girl who sneaks out of her bedroom to meet with an older man and go out with him for the night, only to be found by her mother and the police. At the end, the girl wakes up screaming, indicating that the scenario was only a dream. The performance portion of the video shows the Barenaked Ladies on a set with oversized props giving the appearance that they are within a shoe box kept under the girl's bed. The video is the first to feature new band member Kevin Hearn, who was not involved in the song's recording, but plays marimbas in the video nonetheless. The band later described the making of the video as a "fiasco".

== EP ==
The Shoe Box EP is a four-track EP released as an Enhanced CD, which also contains a data portion. The disc contains both the original Born on a Pirate Ship album version of "Shoe Box", as well as the radio remix, which includes an 8-bar instrumental introduction. The EP also includes the B-side "Trust Me", which also later appeared on the "If I Had $1000000" single; the version on the EP includes a count-in at the beginning that is edited from the later single version. The final track is a version of "If I Had $1000000" from the 1991 EP The Yellow Tape (which previously appeared on the UK Sandwich CD, which contains the first four tracks from The Yellow Tape in CD form).

The data portion features video clips and other multimedia elements playable on a computer. However, the disc was created using the Mixed Mode CD method (as opposed to the more common Blue Book (CD standard)), with the data track in the pregap. This method of presentation has not been supported by Windows or MacOS for some time, and as a result, the data is not easily accessible on modern personal computers.

== Track listing ==
No.	Title	Writer(s)	Lead Vocal(s)	Length
1.	"Shoe Box" (Radio Remix)	Steven Page, Ed Robertson	Page, Robertson	3:09
2.	"Trust Me" (Previously Unreleased)	Stephen Duffy, Page	Page	2:51
3.	"If I Had $1000000" (Yellow Tape Version)	Page, Robertson	Page, Robertson	3:53
4.	"Shoe Box" (Album Version)	Page, Robertson	Page	2:56
Total length:				18:09

== Personnel ==
- Steven Page – lead vocals, electric guitar
- Ed Robertson – acoustic guitar, background vocals
- Jim Creeggan – double bass, background vocals
- Tyler Stewart – drums, tambourine

== Charts ==
=== Weekly charts ===
Chart (1995)	Peak position
Canadian Singles Chart	10

=== Year-end charts ===
Chart (1996)	Position
Canada Top Singles (RPM)	79

== Production ==
- Producers: Michael Phillip Wojewoda, Barenaked Ladies on 3
- Engineering: Michael Phillip Wojewoda, Walter Sobczak on 3
- Photography/Design: Neil Prime-Coote
- Publishing: Treat Baker Music, Warner Brothers Music Corp.
