= Barenaked Ladies (EP) =

EP by Barenaked Ladies
- Released: 1991
- Recorded: 1991
- Genres: College rock; indie rock
- Length: 16:59
- Label: Page Publications
- Producer: Barenaked Ladies

Barenaked Ladies chronology
Barenaked Recess (1990)	Barenaked Ladies (1991)	Variety Recordings: Barenaked Ladies (1991)

Barenaked Ladies (more commonly known as "The Yellow Tape"), is the Barenaked Ladies' third indie tape release, after Buck Naked in 1989 with just Ed Robertson and Steven Page, then Barenaked Lunch (also known as the Pink Tape) in 1990, with bassist Jim Creeggan and percussionist Andy Creeggan. It was recorded in 1991 at Wellesley Sound by Walter Sobczak in Toronto (except for "Be My Yoko Ono," which had been recorded earlier at Number 9 Audio Group).

It was originally recorded as a demo for the band's performance at South by Southwest. The Yellow Tape did very well, becoming the first indie tape to achieve gold status in Canada. Although officially self-titled, it is commonly referred to as The Yellow Tape due to its yellow cover.

It was re-released by Cheree Records in CD and vinyl record formats as Barenaked Ladies in the United Kingdom. The UK release dropped the track "Fight the Power."

Early copies of the tape include an error in the J-card notes: drummer Tyler Stewart's name is misspelled as "Steward." It also includes a different address for the band's management.

In 1995, the band's Shoe Box E.P. single featured this recording of "If I Had $1000000," listed officially as "Yellow Tape Version," indicating the band themselves refer to this release by its common name.

== Track listing ==
All tracks are written by Steven Page and Ed Robertson, except where noted.

No.	Title	Lead vocals	Length
1.	"Be My Yoko Ono"	Steven Page	2:59
2.	"Brian Wilson"	Steven Page	4:49
3.	"Blame It on Me"	Steven Page	3:49
4.	"If I Had $1000000"	Steven Page, Ed Robertson	3:49
5.	"Fight the Power" (Chuck D, Eric Sadler, Keith Shocklee, Hank Shocklee)	Steven Page, Ed Robertson	1:33

== Personnel ==
- Andy Creeggan - congas, vocals
- Jim Creeggan - double bass, vocals
- Steven Page - vocals, guitar
- Ed Robertson - guitar, vocals
- Tyler Stewart - drums

Production

- Barenaked Ladies - production
- Gary Fishman - engineering (track 1)
- Walter Sobezak - engineering (tracks 2–5)
