= Born on a Pirate Ship =

Studio album by Barenaked Ladies
- Released: March 19, 1996
- Recorded: April–July 1995
- Studios: The Gas Station, Toronto; Reaction Studios, Toronto; Manta Eastern, Toronto; Right Tracks Studio, Saskatoon
- Genres: Alternative rock; pop rock
- Length: 51:39
- Label: Reprise
- Producers: Barenaked Ladies, Michael Phillip Wojewoda

Barenaked Ladies chronology
Maybe You Should Drive (1994)	Born on a Pirate Ship (1996)	Rock Spectacle (1996)

Professional ratings
Review scores
Source	Rating
Allmusic	2/5 stars
Encyclopedia of Popular Music	4/5 stars
The Rolling Stone Album Guide	2/5 stars

Born on a Pirate Ship is the third full-length studio album by Barenaked Ladies (BNL), featuring the songs "Shoe Box", "The Old Apartment", "When I Fall" and "Break Your Heart". "The Old Apartment" would become BNL's first US hit in 1997.

Although a moderate hit in Canada reaching No. 12, the album managed No. 111 in the US. Born on a Pirate Ship was awarded gold status in the U.S. in 2000.

== Album information ==
Born on a Pirate Ship was recorded as a four-piece quartet, following the departure of keyboardist Andy Creeggan. Kevin Hearn is not credited on the album, but joined the group for the 1995 tour preceding the album's release in time to be thanked in the liner notes for "injecting new spirit."

Steven Page and Ed Robertson returned to writing together, as they did upon the band's formation, but had abandoned following the release of Gordon.

Regarding the recording of the album, Robertson stated:

"I think the whole band was in a better place. We were all much more engaged, and I remember having a ton of fun making that record. There was lots of silliness and lots of good musical bonding. I have nothing but good memories of those recordings and there’s ongoing jokes from those recording sessions that still come up all the time because it really was a blast"

The album is also an enhanced CD. The data track contains audio samples from the band's previous two CDs, a short montage of press photos, several of the band's music videos, a short trivia quiz, and a pair of "behind the scenes" videos from the band. Similar content was included and expanded upon on the Shoe Box E.P.; however, the disc was created using the Mixed Mode CD method (as opposed to the more common Blue Book (CD standard)), with the data track in the pregap. This method of presentation has not been supported by Windows or MacOS for some time, and as a result, the data is not easily accessible on modern personal computers.

The title and front cover photo refers to a vulgar joke that was popular around the time the band members were children. One kid would instruct another to pull back the corners of their mouth with their fingers (but not stick their tongue out) and say, "I was born on a pirate ship." The result would sound like them saying, "I was born on a pile o' shit." Sometimes "with a bunch of apples" would be added at the end, which would come out as "with a bunch of assholes."

== Track listing ==
All tracks are written by Steven Page and Ed Robertson, except where noted.

No.	Title	Writer(s)	Lead vocals	Length
1.	"Stomach vs. Heart"		Steven Page	2:29
2.	"Straw Hat and Old Dirty Hank"		Steven Page	3:23
3.	"I Know"		Ed Robertson	3:02
4.	"This Is Where It Ends"		Steven Page	2:53
5.	"When I Fall"		Ed Robertson	4:04
6.	"I Live with It Every Day"	Page; Stephen Duffy	Steven Page	4:30
7.	"The Old Apartment"		Steven Page	3:29
8.	"Call Me Calmly"	Page	Steven Page	2:52
9.	"Break Your Heart" (Originally recorded for Maybe You Should Drive)	Page	Steven Page	4:57
10.	"Spider in My Room"	Jim Creeggan	Jim Creeggan	4:03
11.	"Same Thing" (Originally recorded for Maybe You Should Drive)	Robertson	Ed Robertson	4:01
12.	"Just a Toy"		Steven Page	3:42
13.	"In the Drink"	Creeggan	Jim Creeggan	5:12
14.	"Shoe Box"		Steven Page	2:57

== Personnel ==
Barenaked Ladies

- Jim Creeggan – vocals, acoustic and electric double basses, piano (6, 11), acoustic guitar (13), electric guitar (10), dobro (13), violin (2), percussion, yells, string and horn arrangements
- Steven Page – vocals, sound effects, electric guitar (7, 14), piano (6), percussion, yells
- Ed Robertson – vocals, acoustic and electric guitars, pedal steel guitar (7), bass guitar (10), cowbell, sound effects, yells
- Tyler Stewart – drums, piano (2), vibraphone (3), percussion, shaker, Fisher-Price xylophone (10), tambourine, background vocals, phat drumz guy, yells

Additional personnel

- Bryan Adams – yells
- Chris Brown – organ (9)
- Rob Carli – alto saxophone (9)
- Mark Fewer – violin (8)
- Gene Hardy – tenor saxophone (9), musical saw (10)
- Mary-Katherine Finch – cello (8)
- Max Mandel – viola (8)
- Hugh Marsh – violin (11)
- Murray McLauchlan – harmonica (2)
- Michael Phillip Wojewoda – background vocals, tambourine, sound effects, yells
- Tony Rapoport – viola (8)
- Carolyn Ricketts – flute and piccolo (3), string and horn arrangements
- Tim Walsh – trombone (9)
- Stoney Park Pow-Wow Singers – singing and drumming (10)
- Robert Tilton – sample saying "and you have faith! You just need to use it, saith the Lord" on "I Know"

Production

- Producers: Barenaked Ladies, Michael Phillip Wojewoda
- Engineer: Michael Phillip Wojewoda
- Assistant engineers: Jeff Elliott, Tom Heron, Dale Morningstar
- Mixing: Michael Phillip Wojewoda
- Piano preparation: Robin Billinton, Steven Page

== Singles ==
Single information
"The Old Apartment"
- Released: 1997
- Formats: CD, 7"
- Highest US chart position: 88
"Shoe Box"
- Released: 1995
- Format: CD

== Charts ==
Chart (1996)	Peak position
Canada Top Albums/CDs (RPM)	18
US Billboard 200	111

== Certifications ==
Region	Certification	Certified units/sales
Canada (Music Canada)	Gold	50,000^{^}
^{^} Shipments figures based on certification alone.
