= Snacktime! =

Studio album by Barenaked Ladies
- Released: 6 May 2008
- Recorded: November–December 2007
- Genres: Alternative rock, children's music
- Length: 53:50
- Label: Desperation
- Producer: Michael Phillip Wojewoda

Barenaked Ladies chronology
Talk to the Hand: Live in Michigan (2007)	Snacktime! (2008)	All in Good Time (2010)

Professional ratings
Review scores
Source	Rating
Allmusic	3/5 stars
Entertainment Weekly	B+

Snacktime! is a children's-themed studio album by Canadian band Barenaked Ladies released on 6 May 2008 by Desperation Records. A companion book was written with artwork by multi-instrumentalist Kevin Hearn, who also contributed artwork for the album. It is the final Barenaked Ladies release to include Steven Page, who departed the band on 25 February 2009. He was subsequently quoted, saying of the album, "[i]t was a lot of fun to do, but it wasn't my idea. I was along for the ride."

Snacktime! reached number 10 on the Canadian charts and peaked at No. 61 on the Billboard 200. It also won a 2009 Juno Award for the Children's Album of the Year.

== Track listing ==
No.	Title	Writer(s)	Lead vocals Backup vocals	Length
1.	"7 8 9"	Robertson	Ed Robertson	1:33
2.	"The Ninjas"	Page	Steven Page	1:06
3.	"Pollywog in a Bog"	Creeggan/Robertson	Jim Creeggan (lead vocal in a normal voice); Steven Page (backups); Ed Robertson (frog impressions)	3:05
4.	"Raisins"	Robertson	Ed Robertson (lead); Kevin Hearn, Steven Page (backups)	1:40
5.	"Eraser"	Hearn	Jim Creeggan, Kevin Hearn, Steven Page, Ed Robertson, Tyler Stewart	2:24
6.	"I Can Sing"	Robertson	Ed Robertson (lead); Kevin Hearn, Steven Page (backups)	1:09
7.	"Louis Loon"	lyrics: Creeggan/Robertson; music: Creeggan	Steven Page	2:58
8.	"Food Party / Food Party Backsell and Canadian Snacktime Trilogy Intro in an Indoor Tone of Voice"	Barenaked Ladies	Jim Creeggan, Kevin Hearn, Steven Page, Ed Robertson, Tyler Stewart	1:40
9.	"The Canadian Snacktime Trilogy I: Snacktime"	Hearn	Kevin Hearn	3:30
10.	"The Canadian Snacktime Trilogy II: Popcorn"	Hearn	Kevin Hearn, Ed Robertson	1:17
11.	"The Canadian Snacktime Trilogy III: Vegetable Town"	Hearn	Kevin Hearn	2:31
12.	"Drawing"	Hearn	Steven Page	1:44
13.	"Humungous Tree"	Hearn	Steven Page	3:29
14.	"My Big Sister"	Robertson	Ed Robertson	0:54
15.	"Sneezing Sound Effect / Allergies Intro / Allergies"	lyrics: Stewart/Hearn; music: Barenaked Ladies	Kevin Hearn, Tyler Stewart	1:48
16.	"I Don't Like / Eine kleine Nachtmusik"	lyrics: Page/Robertson; music: Robertson/Mozart	Steven Page, Ed Robertson	3:07
17.	"What a Wild Tune / Sad Piano Tune"	Hearn	Ed Robertson	2:32
18.	"Bad Day"	Page	Steven Page	3:42
19.	"Things"	Robertson	Ed Robertson	0:57
20.	"Curious"	Page/Robertson	Steven Page, Ed Robertson	2:01
21.	"A Word for That"	Robertson	Ed Robertson (lead); Kevin Hearn, Steven Page (backups)	1:40
22.	"Wishing"	Robertson	Ed Robertson	2:12
23.	"Crazy ABC's"	Lyrics: Page/Robertson; music: Robertson	Steven Page, Ed Robertson	3:49
24.	"Here Come the Geese"	Hearn	Kevin Hearn	3:13

== Guest stars ==
The first song in the Canadian Snacktime Trilogy, "Snacktime", features vocal contributions from celebrities and children of the band members, each stating their favourite snack. The following list presents each participant and their snack of choice, appearing in the order they are heard in the song.

- Geddy Lee, barbecue potato chips
- Jonah Page, marshmallows
- Harland Williams, blueberry pie
- Finn Creeggan, crackers
- Lyle Lovett, watermelon
- Hazel Stewart, nori
- Sarah McLachlan, chocolate
- Ben Page, 3 lb lobster
- Martin Tielli, olives
- Hannah Robertson, salt & vinegar chips
- David Suzuki, senbei
- Jason Priestley, macaroni & cheese
- Arden Robertson, popcorn
- Gord Downie, peanut butter & crackers
- Isaac Page, ice cream
- Mike Smith (as Bubbles), pickled eggs
- Mili Stewart, Cheezies
- "Weird Al" Yankovic, honey roasted peanuts
- Lyle Robertson, jellybeans
- Janeane Garofalo, microwaved chocolate doughnuts
- Kevin Hearn (as Zignon Five), microchips
- Gordon Lightfoot, pasta

The trilogy concept is influenced by the song "Canadian Railroad Trilogy" by Gordon Lightfoot.
