= Maybe You Should Drive =

Studio album by Barenaked Ladies
- Released: August 16, 1994
- Recorded: 1994
- Genres: Alternative rock; jangle pop; college rock
- Length: 45:46
- Label: Reprise
- Producer: Ben Mink

Barenaked Ladies chronology
Gordon (1992)	Maybe You Should Drive (1994)	Born on a Pirate Ship (1996)

Singles from Maybe You Should Drive
- 1. "Jane" Released: 1994; 2. "Alternative Girlfriend" Released: 1995

Professional ratings
Review scores
Source	Rating
Allmusic	3/5 stars
Encyclopedia of Popular Music	3/5 stars
The Rolling Stone Album Guide	3/5 stars

Maybe You Should Drive is the second studio album by Canadian rock band Barenaked Ladies, released on 16 August 1994 through Reprise Records. The album reached number two in Canada on The Record's Canadian Albums Chart. The album was certified double platinum in Canada and also became the band's first release to chart in the United States, peaking at number 175 on the Billboard 200. Produced by Ben Mink, the album showcases a more introspective tone and marks a transitional phase in the band's development. Notably, lead vocalists and songwriters Steven Page and Ed Robertson collaborated less extensively than on their debut, contributing to a more compartmentalized and moodier final product.

== Background and recording ==
Following the commercial success of Gordon, Barenaked Ladies pursued a more mature and refined sound on their sophomore effort. Recording sessions took place at Bearsville Studios in Woodstock, New York, with Canadian producer Ben Mink, known for his work with k.d. lang and Murray McLauchlan.

Compared to the band's debut, songwriting for this album was notably less collaborative. Steven Page and Ed Robertson, who had co-written the majority of tracks on Gordon, worked more independently on this follow-up. Critics and fans observed that this shift led to a more fragmented album, with differing lyrical tones and stylistic approaches reflecting the individual sensibilities of each songwriter.

As with their early sessions, the band recorded one track, "Intermittently," entirely in the nude as a form of light-hearted tradition. Several tracks written during this period were excluded from the final album. "Break Your Heart" was later re-recorded for Born on a Pirate Ship (1996), while "Trust Me" appeared as a B-side on the Shoe Box EP (1995).

Reflecting on the challenges of recording with a major-label budget, Page noted:

"We did most of the last record in Burnaby, a cold and industrial wasteland, with a huge budget we really did not need. All a huge budget does is put you further in debt. Imagine if they raised your VISA limit to $5,000 and then gave your card to a professional shopper—let us call him a producer—and he said, 'OK, let us spend the whole thing.'"

== Personnel changes ==
During rehearsals for the album, keyboardist and percussionist Andy Creeggan considered leaving the band. Though convinced to stay through the album's recording and subsequent promotional tour, he formally departed in early 1995 to pursue music studies at McGill University in Montreal. He later formed the duo The Brothers Creeggan with his brother Jim Creeggan (Barenaked Ladies' bassist), releasing four albums between 1997 and 2002. His departure led to the addition of multi-instrumentalist Kevin Hearn in 1995, signalling a shift in the band's instrumental texture and stage dynamics.

== Release and reception ==
Maybe You Should Drive was released on 16 August 1994 in Canada and shortly thereafter in the United States. The album yielded two singles: "Jane" and "Alternative Girlfriend," both of which received moderate radio rotation in Canada.

Critical reaction was mixed. Some reviewers appreciated the album's reflective lyrics and subtle arrangements, while others felt it lacked the spontaneity and comedic energy of the band's earlier work. Nevertheless, it helped to maintain the band's popularity in Canada and laid groundwork for their later international success.

In a 2016 interview with Toronto radio station Boom 97.3, Page remarked that the album remained one of his favourite Barenaked Ladies records. Conversely, Robertson stated that it was his least favourite of the band's records, cited "fractured" dynamics and communication issues within the group; the difficulty of following up the success of their previous album, Gordon; and difficulty dealing with the 1993 death of his brother.

The album was certified 2× Platinum by Music Canada, signifying over 200,000 units sold.

== Track listing ==
No.	Title	Writer(s)	Lead vocals	Length
1.	"Jane"	Steven Page; Stephen Duffy	Steven Page	4:04
2.	"Intermittently"	Page	Steven Page	3:05
3.	"These Apples"	Ed Robertson	Ed Robertson	3:10
4.	"You Will Be Waiting"	Page	Steven Page	3:45
5.	"A"	Page	Steven Page	4:20
6.	"Everything Old Is New Again"	Page; Duffy	Steven Page, Ed Robertson	4:13
7.	"Alternative Girlfriend"	Page; Duffy	Steven Page	4:23
8.	"Am I the Only One?"	Robertson	Ed Robertson	4:49
9.	"Little Tiny Song"	Andy Creeggan	Andy Creeggan	1:02
10.	"Life, in a Nutshell"	Page; Robertson	Steven Page	3:14
11.	"The Wrong Man Was Convicted"	Page; Duffy	Steven Page	5:06
12.	"Great Provider"	Page; Robertson; Jim Creeggan	Ed Robertson	4:35

== Personnel ==
=== Barenaked Ladies ===
- Steven Page – lead vocal (1, 2, 4–7, 10, 11), background vocals (1), acoustic guitar (1), electric guitar (2, 7), lead electric guitar (3), harmony vocal (12)
- Ed Robertson – acoustic guitar (1, 3, 4, 6–8, 10–12), electric guitar (1, 2, 3, 5), background vocals (1, 2, 4, 5, 7, 10, 11), lead vocal (3, 6, 8, 12), pedal steel guitar (3, 6), bass drum (2, 6), banjo (3), mandolin (4), electric mandolin (2), mandola (12)
- Andy Creeggan – piano (2–6, 8–11), percussion (3, 5, 8), background vocals (1, 2, 4, 5, 7, 8, 10, 11), lead vocal (9), electric piano (5, 7, 12), keyboards (5, 12), cymbals (2, 6), organ (7), hammered dulcimer (1), timpani (2), accordion (6), reed organ (6), tambourine (7), cuica (9)
- Jim Creeggan – bass guitar (1, 2, 3, 5, 7), double bass (4–6, 8, 10–12), background vocals (1, 2, 4, 5, 7, 8, 10, 11), cello (2, 5, 11), arco bass (2)
- Tyler Stewart – drums (1–7, 10–12), snare drum (2, 6, 11), cowbell (5), laffs (5), cymbals (8)

=== Additional musicians ===
- Ben Mink – violin
- Sarah McElcheran – trumpet
- Gene Hardy – saxophone

=== Technical ===
- Ben Mink – production
- John Whynot – engineering, mixing
- Stephen Marcussen – mastering

== Charts ==
=== Weekly charts ===
Weekly chart performance for Maybe You Should Drive
Chart (1994)	Peak position
Canada Top Albums/CDs (RPM)	3
US Billboard 200	175

=== Year-end charts ===
Year-end chart performance for Maybe You Should Drive
Chart (1994)	Position
Canada Top Albums/CDs (RPM)	31

== Certifications ==
Certifications for Maybe You Should Drive
Region	Certification	Certified units/sales
Canada (Music Canada)	2× Platinum	200,000^{^}
^{^} Shipments figures based on certification alone.
