= Barenaked Ladies =

Canadian rock band

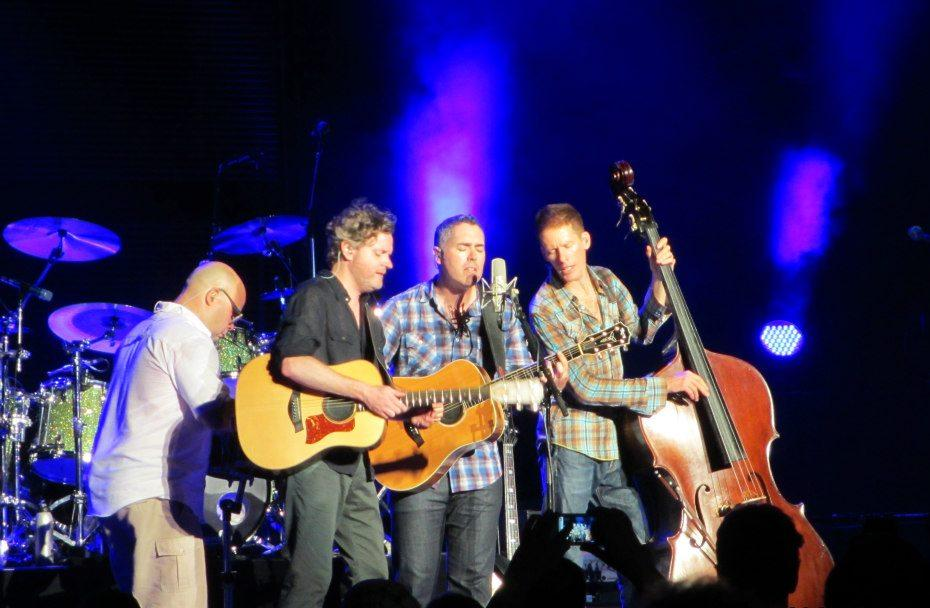
- Barenaked Ladies in 2012

Background information
- Origin: Scarborough, Ontario, Canada
- Genres: Alternative rock; pop rock; folk rock; comedy rock
- Years active: 1988–present
- Labels: Sire; Reprise; Desperation; Raisin'; Vanguard
- Spinoffs: Trans-Canada Highwaymen
- Members: Ed Robertson; Jim Creeggan; Tyler Stewart; Kevin Hearn
- Past members: Steven Page; Andy Creeggan
- Website: barenakedladies.com

Barenaked Ladies are a Canadian rock band formed in Scarborough, Ontario, in 1988. The group began as a duo of singer-guitarists Ed Robertson and Steven Page and expanded to a quintet with bassist Jim Creeggan, percussionist and keyboardist Andy Creeggan, and drummer Tyler Stewart. Multi-instrumentalist Kevin Hearn replaced Andy Creeggan in 1995. Page left the band in 2009; Robertson, Jim Creeggan, Stewart and Hearn have continued as a quartet.

The band first achieved widespread recognition in Canada with the independently released cassette The Yellow Tape (1991), the first independently released recording to receive platinum certification in Canada. Its debut studio album, Gordon (1992), was a major Canadian commercial success. After building an American audience through touring and the live album Rock Spectacle (1996), Barenaked Ladies attained international success with Stunt (1998). The album's lead single, "One Week", reached number one on the US Billboard Hot 100.

Barenaked Ladies' music combines pop and rock songwriting with folk-derived acoustic arrangements, vocal harmonies and lyrics that alternate between humour and more serious subjects. The band's concerts are noted for comic exchanges, improvised songs and freestyle rapping. The group has won eight Juno Awards, received two Grammy Award nominations and was inducted into the Canadian Music Hall of Fame in 2018.

== History ==
=== Formation and independent releases (1988–1991) ===
Robertson and Page attended the same Scarborough public school but became friends as teenagers after discovering a shared interest in music. Both later worked as counsellors at Interprovincial Music Camp in McKellar, Ontario. They devised the name Barenaked Ladies while attending a Bob Dylan concert at Exhibition Stadium.

The duo made its debut on October 1, 1988, at a Second Harvest benefit at Nathan Phillips Square. With little time to rehearse, Robertson and Page filled their set with improvised songs and comic exchanges, an approach that became a continuing feature of the band's performances.

Robertson and Page recorded the cassette Buck Naked in 1989. They subsequently invited brothers Andy and Jim Creeggan, whom they knew from music camp, to join them for performances. A second cassette, Barenaked Lunch, followed in 1990. Stewart joined as drummer that year while Andy Creeggan was studying abroad; Creeggan returned in 1991 on keyboards and percussion.

The five-member lineup recorded The Yellow Tape as a demonstration tape for South by Southwest. After Canadian record companies declined to sign the band, it sold the cassette at concerts and through local retailers. Increasing demand led to commercial distribution through Page Publications, established by Page's father, Victor. The cassette became the first independent release certified platinum by the Canadian Recording Industry Association.

The band received its first Canadian top-40 hit with a version of Bruce Cockburn's "Lovers in a Dangerous Time", recorded for the 1991 tribute album Kick at the Darkness. Its growing popularity also generated controversy when Toronto mayor June Rowlands prevented the group from performing at a 1991 New Year's Eve event at Nathan Phillips Square because she considered its name inappropriate. The decision received national attention and was reversed for subsequent city events.

=== Canadian success and early albums (1992–1997) ===
Barenaked Ladies signed with Sire Records and released Gordon in July 1992. Produced by Michael Phillip Wojewoda, the album included re-recordings of "If I Had $1000000", "Be My Yoko Ono" and "Brian Wilson", together with the singles "Enid" and "What a Good Boy". Gordon reached number one in Canada and was certified diamond for sales of one million copies. The band won Group of the Year at the Juno Awards of 1993.

The follow-up album, Maybe You Should Drive (1994), adopted a comparatively subdued sound and sold less than its predecessor. "Jane", written by Page and Stephen Duffy, became one of the band's best-known songs. The album also spawned the single "Alternative Girlfriend". During the album's touring cycle, tensions developed within the group, and Andy Creeggan left in 1995 to study music at McGill University.

The band recorded Born on a Pirate Ship (1996) as a quartet. The album included "The Old Apartment", whose music video was directed by Jason Priestley, and "Shoe Box", which appeared on the soundtrack to the television series Friends. Hearn joined for the ensuing tour and became a permanent member. The live album Rock Spectacle was released later in 1996. Radio airplay for its versions of "Brian Wilson" and "The Old Apartment" expanded the band's audience in the United States; the album was certified gold there in 1997.

=== International breakthrough (1998–2003) ===
The band worked with producers Susan Rogers and David Leonard on Stunt, released in July 1998. Shortly before its release, Hearn was diagnosed with leukemia and temporarily withdrew from touring while receiving treatment. Musicians including Chris Brown and Greg Kurstin substituted until he returned.

"One Week", written and sung by Robertson and Page, topped the Billboard Hot 100 and helped Stunt reach number three on the Billboard 200. The album also produced the singles "It's All Been Done", "Call and Answer" and "Alcohol" and was certified multi-platinum in Canada and the United States. Barenaked Ladies received three Juno Awards in 1999, including Best Group and Best Pop Album, while "One Week" was nominated for a Grammy Award for best pop performance by a duo or group. The band also released the single "Get in Line" for the King of the Hill soundtrack in late 1999.

The band followed with Maroon in 2000, produced by Don Was. Led by "Pinch Me", the album reached number one in Canada and number five in the United States. "Pinch Me" received the band's second Grammy nomination. Maroon also features the successful singles "Falling For the First Time" and "Too Little Too Late". The compilation Disc One: All Their Greatest Hits (1991–2001) followed in 2001. The 19-track compilation features previously released material, plus two new songs, "It's Only Me (The Wizard of Magicland)" and "Thanks That Was Fun".

After a brief hiatus, Barenaked Ladies returned with Everything to Everyone in October 2003. It includes the singles "Another Postcard", "Celebrity", and "Testing 1,2,3". The album completed its contract with Reprise, after which Barenaked Ladies resumed operating independently while retaining distribution arrangements with Warner Bros. Records.

=== Independent period and departure of Page (2004–2009) ===
Barenaked for the Holidays (2004) was the band's first independent album since The Yellow Tape and the first recorded at Page's Fresh Baked Woods studio. It was issued through the band's Desperation Records label. In 2005, the members composed and recorded music for the Stratford Festival production of Shakespeare's As You Like It.

The group recorded 29 songs during sessions in 2005 and 2006. They were divided between Barenaked Ladies Are Me (2006) and Barenaked Ladies Are Men (2007), with the latter also available as part of a boxed edition containing both albums. The band experimented with direct digital distribution during this period and offered professionally recorded concerts through its website.

The group wrote and recorded "Big Bang Theory Theme" for the television sitcom The Big Bang Theory, which premiered in 2007. The song became one of the band's most widely recognized recordings. The children's album Snacktime! followed in 2008 and received the 2009 Juno Award for Children's Album of the Year.

In 2008, Steven Page was arrested in upstate New York for cocaine possession. On February 24, 2009, Barenaked Ladies and Page announced that he had left by mutual agreement. Page wanted to create music that went in a different direction and believed his voice was being left out as a result of being in a five-member band. The remaining members continued as a quartet, while Page pursued solo and theatrical work. Robertson said that Page's departure created additional space for the group's other songwriters, while Page later described a working relationship that had become dominated by stress.

=== Continued recording and Canadian Music Hall of Fame (2010–2019) ===
The quartet recorded All in Good Time with Wojewoda. Released in March 2010, it was the first Barenaked Ladies album without Page and featured songwriting and lead vocals from all four members. The album's lead single, "You Run Away", addressed the aftermath of the separation. Another single from this album, "Every Subway Car", was released and features American singer Erin McCarley. In April 2010, All In Good Time charted at #1 on the U.S. Independent Albums on Billboard.

Barenaked Ladies signed with Vanguard Records and released Grinning Streak in June 2013. Its singles included "Boomerang", "Odds Are" and "Did I Say That Out Loud?". The album debuted at number ten on the Billboard 200. A music video for "Odds Are" was released as a collaboration with the American entertainment company Rooster Teeth, who has also produced several other music videos for the band. The band also collaborated with Canadian astronaut Chris Hadfield and the Wexford Gleeks choir on "I.S.S. (Is Somebody Singing)", performed in February 2013 with Hadfield aboard the International Space Station.

Silverball followed in June 2015. It was preceded by the lead single "Say What You Want", which was released on April 28, 2015. Its music video was released by Rooster Teeth. Two more singles were released in 2015: "Silverball" and "Duct Tape Heart". The album charted at #5 on the Billboard U.S. Independent Albums. A concert from that album's tour was issued as the live album BNL Rocks Red Rocks in 2016.

The band then recorded new arrangements of its songs with the vocal group The Persuasions for Ladies and Gentlemen: Barenaked Ladies and The Persuasions (2017). Their twelfth album of original material, Fake Nudes, was released later that year in November 2017. The first and only single from this album is "Lookin' Up". The album received mostly positive reviews.

On March 25, 2018, Barenaked Ladies was inducted into the Canadian Music Hall of Fame at the Juno Awards in Vancouver. Page, who was included in the induction, performed with the group for the first time since 2009; Andy Creeggan also joined the performance but was not inducted. No further reunion followed. Page later said that he had chosen "One Week" and "If I Had $1000000" for the ceremony because the songs represented his musical partnership with Robertson, which he regarded as central to the band's identity during his tenure. In 2026, Page expressed doubt that another reunion would take place: "I think they don't want to do it. I don't think they want to work with me. And I've had to kind of be okay with that."

=== 2020–present ===
Recording sessions for Detour de Force began in early 2020 but were interrupted by the COVID-19 pandemic. The band completed the album later that year, while its planned Last Summer on Earth tour was postponed until 2022. On April 12, 2021, the lead single from the album was released, "Flip". Released in July 2021, Detour de Force received mixed reviews; Exclaim! viewed it as drawing upon the band's earlier strengths without fully establishing a new direction.

The band released In Flight in September 2023. The album was preceded by three singles: "Lovin' Life", "Too Old", and "One Night". Its songs address aging, mortality and maintaining personal relationships, while retaining the group's vocal harmonies and mixture of acoustic and electric arrangements. An acoustic EP drawn from the album, In Flight – Carry On, followed in 2025. The band released the single "Almost Ready" in June 2026, its first newly recorded song since In Flight. In July 2026, they released a folk-leaning single called "Careful (For Dee)".

== Musical style and performance ==
Barenaked Ladies has been described as alternative pop, pop rock and folk rock. Its early recordings emphasized acoustic guitars, double bass and close vocal harmony. As its studio resources expanded, the band incorporated electric rock arrangements, keyboards and a broader range of production styles. Page and Robertson initially shared most lead vocals and songwriting; after Page's departure, Robertson became the principal lead singer while Creeggan, Hearn and Stewart assumed more prominent writing and vocal roles.

Humour is a recurring element of the band's lyrics and public image, particularly in songs such as "If I Had $1000000" and "One Week". Its catalogue also includes songs addressing depression, relationships, anxiety and social isolation. AllMusic's Andrew Leahey characterized the group as combining melodic pop-rock with humour while retaining an ability to address serious subjects.

The band's concerts commonly include improvised songs, comic banter and Robertson's freestyle raps. These elements developed from the largely improvised performance at the duo's first show and became an identifying feature of the group rather than a separate comedy act.

== Legacy and other activities ==
The Yellow Tape became a landmark in Canadian independent music as the country's first independently released cassette to achieve platinum certification. The success of Gordon established Barenaked Ladies as one of Canada's leading bands of the early 1990s, while Stunt and "One Week" extended that popularity internationally. In 2024, Billboard described the band's continued touring and recording as a 35-year career sustained by its live audience and collaborative internal structure.

Barenaked Ladies and other Canadian performers formed the Canadian Music Creators Coalition in 2006 to advocate for artists during debates over Canadian copyright policy. The band also worked with the environmental organization Reverb on the "Barenaked Planet" program, which promoted recycling, alternative tour fuels and carbon offsets at its concerts.

An authorized biography, Barenaked Ladies: Public Stunts, Private Stories, written by musician and journalist Paul Myers with the band's participation, was published in 2001 and revised in 2003.

== Awards and nominations ==
Barenaked Ladies has won eight Juno Awards from 18 group nominations. Its wins include Group of the Year in 1993, 1999 and 2001; pop-album awards for Stunt and Maroon; Single of the Year for "One Week"; and Children's Album of the Year for Snacktime!. "One Week" and "Pinch Me" received Grammy nominations for best pop performance by a duo or group in 1999 and 2001, respectively.

The band was inducted into the Canadian Music Hall of Fame in 2018.

== Band members ==
=== Current members ===
- Ed Robertson – lead and backing vocals, guitars (1988–present)
- Jim Creeggan – bass guitar, double bass, backing and occasional lead vocals (1989–present)
- Tyler Stewart – drums, percussion, backing and occasional lead vocals, strings (1990–present)
- Kevin Hearn – keyboards, guitars, backing and occasional lead vocals (1995–present)

=== Former members ===
- Steven Page – lead and backing vocals, guitars (1988–2009; guest appearance in 2018)
- Andy Creeggan – keyboards, percussion, backing and occasional lead vocals (1989–1995; guest appearances in 2018, 2026)

== Discography ==
=== Studio albums of original material ===
- Gordon (1992)
- Maybe You Should Drive (1994)
- Born on a Pirate Ship (1996)
- Stunt (1998)
- Maroon (2000)
- Everything to Everyone (2003)
- Barenaked Ladies Are Me (2006)
- Barenaked Ladies Are Men (2007)
- All in Good Time (2010)
- Grinning Streak (2013)
- Silverball (2015)
- Fake Nudes (2017)
- Detour de Force (2021)
- In Flight (2023)

=== Themed and collaborative studio albums ===
- Barenaked for the Holidays (2004)
- Snacktime! (2008)
- Ladies and Gentlemen: Barenaked Ladies and The Persuasions (with The Persuasions, 2017)

== See also ==
- List of diamond-certified albums in Canada
- Canadian rock
