= Michael Phillip Wojewoda =

Canadian musician

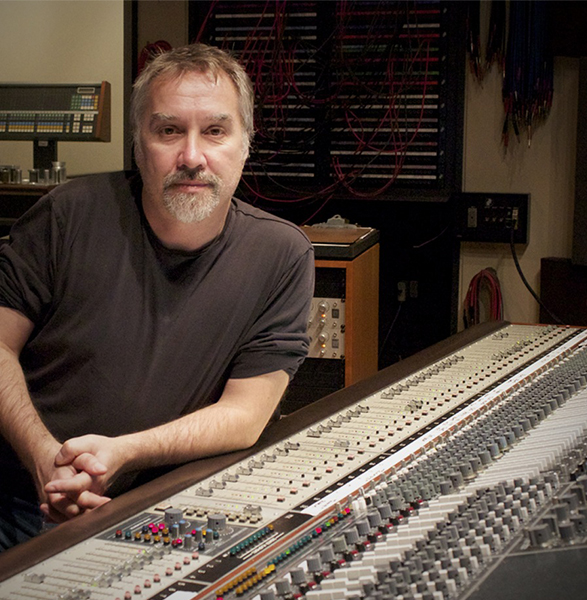
- Wojewoda at the console at Revolution Recorders, Toronto

Background information
- Origin: Toronto, Ontario, Canada
- Genres: Indie rock
- Occupations: Musician, record producer
- Formerly of: Rheostatics

Michael Phillip Wojewoda is a Canadian record producer and musician. He has been nominated for eight Juno Awards and has received one for Recording Engineer of the Year and one for Producer of the Year.

== History ==
Wojewoda began recording bands in 1977, working in the basement of his mother's beauty salon and using rudimentary equipment. In 1985, he produced the 2016 Polaris Music Prize and 2017 Polaris Music Prize Heritage Prize nominated album To Sir With Hate by Fifth Column. He has produced several critically and commercially successful Canadian albums of the 1990s, including Barenaked Ladies' Gordon, Spirit of the West's Faithlift, Ashley MacIsaac's Hi™ How Are You Today? and Rheostatics' Whale Music. Wojewoda won a Juno Award in 1994 for best engineer, in 1996, for best producer and again in 2008 for the Barenaked Ladies' Snacktime!.

His credits include albums for The Waltons, Doughboys, Bourbon Tabernacle Choir, Change of Heart, Fifth Column, Great Big Sea, Northern Haze, Riit and The Jerry Cans.

He replaced Don Kerr as drummer for the Rheostatics in 2001, and remained with the band until their dissolution in 2007.

He was one of the producers, alongside Jon Levine and Chris Birkett, of Buffy Sainte-Marie's Polaris Music Prize-winning 2015 album Power in the Blood.

== See also ==
- Music of Canada
- Canadian rock
