= Andy Creeggan =

Canadian musician (born 1971)

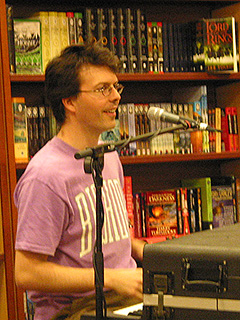
- Creeggan performing with The Brothers Creeggan in London, Ontario, Canada in 2002.

Background information
- Born: Andrew Burnett Creeggan; July 4, 1971 (age 54); Scarborough, Ontario, Canada
- Genres: Alternative rock, post-punk, acoustic rock
- Occupation: Musician
- Instruments: Keyboards, accordion, guitar, drums, percussion
- Years active: 1990–present

Andrew Burnett Creeggan (born July 4, 1971) is a Canadian musician, known for being a former member of the alternative rock band Barenaked Ladies. He was also a member of the trio The Brothers Creeggan, and a solo artist having released three albums.

== Career ==
=== Barenaked Ladies ===
Creeggan was born in the Toronto suburb of Scarborough, Ontario. Along with his brother Jim, he was invited by Ed Robertson and Steven Page (then performing as Barenaked Ladies as a duo) to play a Christmastime club show with them in Toronto, with Andy playing conga drums. The two were then invited to join the band. Only six months later, at the beginning of the summer of 1990, he joined the Canada World Youth exchange program for a trip to South America. While he was gone, the band met drummer Tyler Stewart, and invited him to join the band.

Creeggan returned at the beginning of 1991 to find Tyler having taken his percussion role. He switched over to keyboards (still playing congas on a few songs) and a few other occasional percussion and musical instruments. He played on two of the band's early demo tapes, Barenaked Lunch (before he left for South America), and The Yellow Tape (after he returned). He also played on the band's first two official releases, Gordon and Maybe You Should Drive.

Creeggan was never completely comfortable being in the band, and wanted to continue his education in other musical areas. He recounts, "I wanted space for my music, my personality. I was always very interested in instrumental music and I wanted to take advantage of having been accepted at the Faculty of Music at McGill University in Montreal and really pursue theory and composition." According to Steven Page, "Andy had considered leaving the band as early as the rehearsals for the latter album, but was convinced to stay for the recording and tour." Creeggan departed at the conclusion of the tour. They recorded their third album, Born on a Pirate Ship as a quartet and asked Kevin Hearn to join the band for the subsequent tour in 1996.

=== The Brothers Creeggan ===
The two Creeggan brothers also had their own writing interests (Barenaked Ladies music mostly coming from Page and Robertson) and in 1994, released an album titled The Brothers Creeggan. They have since released three more albums—The Brothers Creeggan II (1997), Trunks (2000) and Sleepyhead (2002)—and toured in support of them. Their music consists mostly of songs fusing rock and jazz. The duo have been on hiatus since 2003.

=== Andiwork ===
Creeggan's four solo works—Andiwork (1997), Andiwork II (2004), Andiwork III (2011), and Andiwork IV (2021) are more contemporary classical, with touches of jazz and rock. The albums are largely instrumental pieces.
