= Jim Creeggan =

Canadian musician (born 1970)

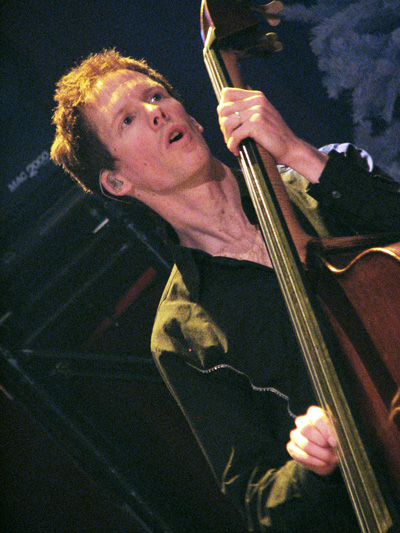
- Jim Creeggan in 2008

Background information
- Born: James Raymond Creeggan; February 12, 1970 (age 56); Scarborough, Ontario, Canada
- Occupations: Musician; songwriter
- Instruments: Double bass; bass guitar; guitar; piano; violin; cello; vocals
- Years active: 1990–present

James Raymond Creeggan (born February 12, 1970) is a Canadian musician, best known as the bassist for Canadian alternative rock band Barenaked Ladies.

== Early life ==
Creeggan was born in the Toronto suburb of Scarborough, Ontario. His mother taught piano lessons to neighbourhood children, which Creeggan credits as part of the reason for his interest in music.

== Career ==
Creeggan has played the double bass since he was in school. He was a member of a variety of school bands, as well as local youth symphony groups. He lived in the Knox College, Toronto residence while attending the University of Toronto for bass performance, though he did not complete a degree. Creeggan, along with his brother Andy, was invited to play with Ed Robertson and Steven Page (then performing as Barenaked Ladies as a duo) at a Christmastime show in Toronto, and the pair was asked to join the band permanently. Creeggan has been with the band ever since, while his brother left the band in 1995. He and Andy formed a group together named The Brothers Creeggan before Andy left BNL. They continued to play following his departure, and went on a hiatus in the early 2000s.

He regularly plays a double bass, both bowed and pizzicato. He has also played Electric double bass (including a Zeta bass circa Maybe You Should Drive, and a couple Ned Steinbergers later on), and bass guitar for BNL. He won the 1999 best male bassist award from the Gibson Guitar Corporation. He uses a French bow for his double bass. He has occasionally played guitar on some Barenaked Ladies songs; mainly on songs which he sings lead (though he also plays bass on some of those). Creeggan has also contributed to albums with each of the other members of the violin family, and has orchestrated musical charts for various band instruments to be recorded by session musicians.

Creeggan made minor contributions to the writing of the band's first two albums, in the form of several co-writes. His first major songs contributed to an album appeared on the band's third release, 1996's Born on a Pirate Ship, which featured both "Spider In My Room" and "In The Drink"; two songs written exclusively by Creeggan, and both with him on lead vocals. He would record another song, "Inline Bowline" for 2000's Maroon, but the track was left off the album (later released as a b-side/bonus track). The band instituted a new, more open writing process for their next album, and several of Creeggan's song ideas were expanded into songs featured on 2003's Everything to Everyone.

2004's Barenaked for the Holidays featured a holiday tune, "Christmas Pics", sung by Creeggan, and 2006's Barenaked Ladies Are Me features Creeggan singing lead on "Peterborough and the Kawarthas", among other Creeggan co-written songs included. The band's 2008 children's album, Snacktime! features Creeggan co-writes "Louis Loon" and "Pollywog In A Bog", the latter of which he sang. Creeggan wrote and sang lead on two songs from the band's 2010 album All in Good Time, "On The Lookout" and "I Saw It", as well as a bonus track titled "She Turned Away". Creeggan wrote and sang a song for 2013's Grinning Streak, titled "Who Knew?", that was left off the album and released as a bonus track. Creeggan wrote and sang a song titled "Narrow Streets" for the 2015 album Silverball.

In their first show since the 2009 departure of Steven Page from the band, Creeggan took over some of Page's harmony vocals, and his lead vocals on the song "Maybe Katie"; a song Creeggan originated with vocals split between Page and Robertson.

Creeggan has played bass as a guest on a number of albums; mostly of Canadian artists. He also commonly joins artists opening for Barenaked Ladies who do not play with a full band. He has done this on the band's Ships and Dip cruises as well.

== Song list ==
Songs written/co-written by Creeggan include the following:
with Barenaked Ladies

- "Grade 9" (with Andy Creeggan, Steven Page, Ed Robertson, Tyler Stewart)
- "Wrap Your Arms Around Me" (with Steven Page, Ed Robertson)
- "I Love You" (with Andy Creeggan, Steven Page, Ed Robertson)
- "Great Provider" (with Steven Page, Ed Robertson)
- "Spider in My Room"
- "In the Drink"
- "Inline Bowline"
- "Maybe Katie" (with Steven Page, Ed Robertson)
- "Next Time" (with Steven Page, Ed Robertson, Kevin Hearn)
- "Long While"
- "Christmas Pics"
- "Everything Had Changed" (with Steven Page, Ed Robertson)
- "Peterborough and the Kawarthas"
- "Pollywog in a Bog" (with Ed Robertson)
- "Louis Loon" (with Ed Robertson)
- "On the Lookout"
- "I Saw It"
- "She Turned Away"
- "Narrow Streets"
- "Who Knew?"
- "We Took the Night"
