= Ed Robertson =

Canadian musician (born 1970)

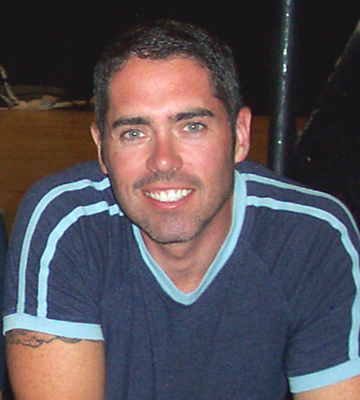
- Robertson in 2005

Background information
- Born: Lloyd Edward Elwyn Robertson; October 25, 1970 (age 55); Scarborough, Ontario, Canada
- Occupations: Musician, singer, songwriter, record producer
- Instruments: Vocals, guitar, bass, drums, synthesizer, banjo, mandolin
- Years active: 1988–present
- Member of: Barenaked Ladies
- Formerly of: Yukon Kornelius

Lloyd Edward Elwyn Robertson (born October 25, 1970) is a Canadian musician, best known as the lead singer, guitarist, and songwriter of the band Barenaked Ladies. He, along with former member Steven Page, founded the group in 1988. Following Page's departure in 2009, Robertson, bassist Jim Creeggan, and drummer Tyler Stewart remain the only members from the band's first studio album still active in the group. Kevin Hearn, who joined later, is also part of the current lineup.

== Biography ==
=== Early and personal life ===
Robertson was born in the Toronto suburb of Scarborough, Ontario. He is the youngest of five children, with two sisters, Lynn and Bonnie, and two brothers, Bill and Doug; He claims to have been named on a bet. His mother, Wilma, was a secretary for Imperial Oil, and his father, Earl, worked both as a shipping foreman for Honeywell, and as an egg grader. He believes that his conception was an "accident" because he is several years younger than his siblings, who were all born about one year apart. He credits this situation with allowing him to have the experience of being both in a big family, and an only child—once his siblings moved out of their home.

Robertson began working part-time when he was 13 years old. He has bragged about being named employee of the month at his local Wendy's in July 1985 (he considers this his life's greatest accomplishment). He also answered phones at a CAA office. Robertson appeared in the music video for "All We Are" by Kim Mitchell from Mitchell's 1985 album Akimbo Alogo.

Robertson was brought up in a home where country music was played almost exclusively; he is still fond of it today. He sang harmonies with his family and learned how to play guitar, which his father also played. Once he began playing guitar for other people, around grade five, he knew he wanted to be a performer. He was in several bands during his school days including a band that covered a collection of rock artists, such as Rush and Kim Mitchell.

In grade four, Robertson entered the gifted program at Churchill Heights Public School. Robertson's first run-in with Steven Page, who was a year ahead in the same gifted program, was when he unknowingly "stole" Page's best friend. It would be several years before the two would really speak to each other. Page saw Robertson at a Harvey's restaurant after a Peter Gabriel concert and was surprised to find that Robertson was also a fan. This ultimately led to their talking and becoming friends.

Robertson attended Woburn Collegiate Institute with Page and, around grade twelve, realized he needed to focus on passing his courses to get into university, believing his goal of being a musician was something of a "pipe dream". It was around this time that he began playing with Page. The two became counsellors at Scarborough Schools Music Camp in the summer of 1988, and spent a lot of time together singing songs and playing guitar. Page was flattered that Robertson knew some of the songs he had written, which Robertson had learned after acquiring a copy of a cassette tape Page had recorded. Page was also impressed by Robertson's ear for singing harmony. Upon receiving a telephone call from an organizer of a benefit concert to which Robertson had committed his recently broken-up band to play, Robertson quickly advised the organizer that he would still be performing but that the name of the band had changed to Barenaked Ladies, a name he had previously joked with Page about. Robertson then phoned Page and invited Page to be his bandmate in Barenaked Ladies. The benefit concert marked the first performance of the duo as Barenaked Ladies.

Robertson was accepted to York University, but dropped out after only half a year, choosing to devote his time completely to the band. He and Page spent the next two years building the reputation and following for Barenaked Ladies, joined along the way by Andy and Jim Creeggan, and Tyler Stewart.

Robertson was the second member of Barenaked Ladies to get married, and the first to have children. He married his longtime girlfriend, Natalie Herbert, in June 1994. They had their first child, Hannah, on November 17, 1995; their second child, Lyle, was born September 29, 1999; and their third child, Arden, was born August 7, 2002. As the first in the band to have children, he was also one of the first to advocate for spending less time touring and more time at home with family. When he is not working with Barenaked Ladies, Robertson prefers to spend as much time as he can with his family in Toronto, or at their Bancroft-area cottage.

Robertson's brother Doug died after crashing his motorcycle in June 1993. The experience affected Ed, which came through in his songwriting. The song "Am I The Only One?" from the 1994 Barenaked Ladies album Maybe You Should Drive, which he had been writing about his then-future wife, ended up being about the loss of his brother; the song "Leave" from 1998's Stunt is about the image of his brother haunting him in hotel rooms while on tour; and the song "Tonight is the Night I Fell Asleep at the Wheel" from 2000's Maroon was based on Robertson's curiosity about what his brother was thinking about in his last moments. His mother died on December 13, 2008, at age 72, and his father died on June 10, 2011, at the age of 76. Robertson wrote the song "Moonstone" about his mother dying. It was recorded during the All in Good Time sessions, and although it was not included in the basic album, it was released as a bonus track.

== Role in Barenaked Ladies ==
Robertson is the primary guitarist for the band, playing dominantly rhythm guitar (evenly split between acoustic and electric) on nearly all of the band's songs. Two of his three bandmates also play guitar with the band on certain songs (Kevin Hearn sometimes on lead, and Jim Creeggan occasionally playing rhythm guitar for songs he sings lead on). During his tenure with the band, Steven Page also played rhythm guitar and, occasionally, lead guitar on around a third of the band's songs. Robertson is capable of playing several other instruments including drums, pedal steel guitar, banjo and mandolin, but he rarely plays anything other than guitar, or occasionally 6-string banjo, on stage. On each passing album, he has sung lead on an increased number of songs, to the point where he shared approximately equal duty with Page by the time the latter left the band. Robertson performed co-lead vocals with Page on "If I Had $1000000" and "One Week" and solo lead on many singles since the release of the latter. He and his bandmates have taken over Page's lead and harmony vocal parts following the latter's departure. Robertson also often includes rapping and beatboxing into performances with Barenaked Ladies.

Robertson contributed to the writing for the band from their first album. Much of his contribution initially came in the way of co-writing with Page. As the years have passed, Robertson has written an increased amount on his own. He credits Jason Plumb in part for changing his perspective on songwriting, in that instead of trying to write one great song, he would commit to writing a certain number of ideas and they might not all be great, but parts of the songs would sometimes fit together into great songs. As well, Plumb encouraged Robertson to simply come up with an idea that fascinates him, and then to analyze it. The first song he wrote with this method was "When I Fall", based on the concept of "a window washer who's afraid of heights".

Besides Tyler Stewart, who does not typically compose, Robertson is the only other band member who has not written and recorded songs outside of the Barenaked Ladies for himself in the form of a side project. Robertson has preferred to spend creative energy outside the band in co-writing and producing songs for other people (including Andy Kim and Jason Plumb).

In 2002, Robertson won an International Achievement Award at the SOCAN Awards in Toronto for the song "Pinch Me" that he co-wrote with Steven Page.

== Television ==
In 2006, Robertson began starring in Ed's Up for OLN Canada. The program covers his journeys by plane to various locations given to him only in the form of GPS coordinates. At these locations, he learns about and participates in a local occupation. The series premiered on November 1, 2006; Robertson filmed a second season in the summer of 2007, which premiered on November 7. A third season was filmed over the summer of 2008. The series was produced by Peace Point Entertainment. Director: Andrew MacDonald, Producer: Craig Flemming, Supervising Producer: Vallery Hyduk.

In 2008, Ed Robertson guest co-hosted Daily Planet on Discovery Channel for several weeks while one of the regular hosts was away.

He can be seen in a handful of season 8 and 9 episodes of Degrassi: The Next Generation as the music teacher, Mr. Fowler, which aired new in 2009 on Canada's CTV and TeenNick in the States.

On May 29, 2012, Robertson was the guest co-host on the U.S. television morning talk show, Live with Kelly.

From 2004, Robertson voiced the occasionally recurring character of Captain Butch Flowers/Agent Florida in the web series Red vs. Blue.

== Other activities and interests ==
Robertson received his pilot's license in 2005, and the 2007 season of Ed's Up was purportedly designed around his attempting to earn his floatplane license. He also rides a motorcycle, which he has taken on some of the band's tours in the past to ride during off-time.

In April 2009, Robertson was recognized for his interest in aviation and the Canadian military by being named Honorary Colonel of 424 Transport and Rescue Squadron of the Canadian Forces. Following the signing, HCol Robertson said that the investiture was "the most incredible honour" he has received. "I have always been thoroughly blown away by the incredible work of our military," he said. "It's a day I thought I would never see come. When I got the letter from the Defence Minister, I was, like, ‘This is real; I am actually going to be an honorary colonel!’" Robertson held the position until March 2012, noting that, although he had not been able to be around as much as he would have liked, the Squadron felt like family to him.

Robertson is fan of video games, and claims to have had almost every console system released since he was a child. He usually brings several consoles and many games on tour with him. Robertson is a fan of the popular Rooster Teeth series Red vs. Blue, lending his voice to the series to voice Captain Butch Flowers, during a time travel episode in the third season. Originally for a one-off episode, Flowers was re-introduced late in the fifth season, four episodes before the season finale. Flowers later made an appearance in the season finale of the tenth season. Rooster Teeth Productions has also made special videos, using Red vs. Blue characters, to be shown at Barenaked Ladies shows. In February 2009, he starred as Captain Dynamic, in Rooster Teeth Productions live action mini-series, Captain Dynamic, which promotes the video game City of Heroes.

Robertson is an avid pinball player and collector, buying his first machine in 1999. The title of Barenaked Ladies 2015 album Silverball reflects this, and the music video for the title track was filmed in Robertson's own collection of pinball machines. In February 2016 Robertson appeared on the popular Twitch pinball stream "Bro, Do You Even Pinball?" where he talked about his love for the game and competed against the shows' hosts from Buffalo Pinball.

Robertson won Humber College's inaugural Euterpe Award at the close of the 2005 Humber Songwriting Workshop. In his honour, the school named a scholarship after him for their summer songwriting workshop.

Having an interest in acting, Robertson had a cameo in Charlie's Angels 2, which was offered to him by director Joseph McGinty Nichol, who had directed Barenaked Ladies' video for "One Week". Robertson had a larger role in the independent Canadian film Love, Sex and Eating the Bones, which was directed by childhood friend Sudz Sutherland.

Robertson collaborated with astronaut and musician Chris Hadfield in writing a brand new song for Music Monday 2013. Music Monday is a Canadian event to spread the importance of music education. The song, written by Robertson and Hadfield, premiered on February 7, 2013, with Chris joining in from the International Space Station.

=== Plane crash ===
At 12:30 pm on August 24, 2008, Robertson was involved in a plane crash while piloting his amphibious Cessna 206, north of Bancroft, Ontario. He and his three passengers walked away from the crash with no apparent injuries. The Transport Canada Civil Aviation Daily Occurrence Report (CADOR) indicated that the crash occurred after take-off from Baptiste Lake when Robertson apparently lost airspeed and settled into the trees approximately 300 metres in from the shoreline. The Transportation Safety Board handled the investigation. After several weeks, the TSB was unable to determine a cause of the crash, but cleared Robertson of any misconduct. Additionally, no evidence of mechanical problems was found. Investigator Ray Simpson reported that the investigation was unlikely to produce any further results, and had therefore been essentially closed. Simpson added that undetectable air currents could have been the cause of the crash, but there is no evidence for or against the possibility. He commended Robertson for being "outstanding" in his cooperation with the investigation.
