= Grow Old with Me =

Song by John Lennon

from the album Milk and Honey
- Released: 27 January 1984
- Recorded: November 1980
- Genre: Pop
- Length: 3:09
- Songwriter: John Lennon
- Producers: John Lennon; Yoko Ono

"Grow Old with Me" is one of the final songs written by John Lennon. It was first recorded by Lennon as a demo while in Bermuda. A handwritten lyric sheet for the song is dated July 5, 1980. The song was first released on the posthumous album Milk and Honey in 1984. It was also rumoured to be among the songs planned as a possible reunion single by his former bandmates during the making of The Beatles Anthology.

== Origins and inspiration ==
The song was inspired from two main sources: a poem penned by Robert Browning titled "Rabbi ben Ezra" and a song by Lennon's wife Yoko Ono called "Let Me Count the Ways." The latter had been inspired by Sonnets from the Portuguese Number 43 by Elizabeth Barrett Browning.

Lennon and Ono had for some time admired the poetry of Robert and Elizabeth Browning. In fact, they thought they might be the couple reincarnated. Ono said "'Back when we were living in England in Ascot, John was reading this book about Robert and Elizabeth Browning. He said to me, 'We're just a reincarnation of Robert and Elizabeth Browning.' (laughing) I said, 'Maybe.'" The two songs were purposely written with the couple in mind.

Ono woke up one morning in the summer of 1980 with the music of "Let Me Count the Ways" in her head. She rang Lennon in Bermuda to play it for him. Lennon loved the song, and Ono then suggested to him that he should write a Robert Browning piece to accompany it. They discussed having portraits of themselves as the Brownings on the cover of the album.

Lennon asked to have a collection of Browning's works sent. However, that afternoon, Yoko says in the liner notes to Milk and Honey, John was watching TV when a film came on which had the poem "Rabbi Ben Ezra" by Robert Browning in it. Inspired by this turn of events, Lennon wrote "Grow Old with Me" as an answer to Ono's song, and rang her back to play it to her over the phone.

In October 2020 it was reported that the baseball film which Lennon had been watching in Bermuda was A Love Affair: The Eleanor and Lou Gehrig Story, about baseball player Lou Gehrig, who died of a rare nervous system disorder which later came to bear his name in popular media. In that movie, Eleanor Gehrig, played by Blythe Danner, reads a letter in which Lou Gehrig writes, "Thanks very much for sending me that book of poems. I especially liked the one by Robert Browning that goes, 'Grow old along with me! / The best is yet to be'..."

Kenneth Womack made the discovery "after watching dozens in search of the mysterious film in question, I began to study TV guides from that period. John was a regular subscriber." Upon realizing A Love Affair had been screened at the time Lennon was staying in Bermuda, Womack made the connection, concluding: "The mystery, quite suddenly, was solved".

Musically, the earliest inspirations for "Grow Old With Me" trace all the way back to the summer of 1976 when Lennon wrote an un-released song called "Tennessee." That song was inspired by reading works of playwright Tennessee Williams, specifically "A Streetcar Named Desire."

"Over the next several months", according to "The Lost Lennon Tapes" host Elliot Mintz, that song morphed into another un-released song called "Howling at the Moon." Later, after reworking the "Tennessee" lyrics and putting those verses together with "Howling At The Moon," Lennon retitled the song "Memories."

The opening chords and cadence of what would become "Grow Old With Me" can clearly be heard in Take 2 of "Memories", as can what would become the descending ending chords of "Grow Old With Me". Lennon also sang part of the same melody to the lyrics of "Watching the Wheels" in that song's early stages of development.

The song "Memories" was top of mind as Lennon worked in Bermuda on a collection of old songs while also writing new ones. Womack writes, "During this same time, Lennon resuscitated his song fragment for "Memories," for which he double tracked the lead vocal and supplemented his original piano instrumentation, recorded at his home in The Dakota, with an improvisational acoustic guitar part."

== Significance ==
"Grow Old with Me" is at times misattributed as Lennon's "last" or "final" song. This is inaccurate. A handwritten lyric sheet for the song is dated July 5, 1980. Lennon is known to have written other songs after that date. Among them, "Real Love" has a handwritten lyric sheet dated July 9, 1980 and "Cleanup Time" is dated July 20. The confusion might be due to the album sleeve notes, as Ono writes "the version that was left to us was John's last recording.". However, it appears Ono is referring to the version of the song rather than Lennon's final recording. It is well-established that Lennon recorded other songs subsequent to "Grow Old With Me," such as his work on Ono's "Walking on Thin Ice."

The two songs, "Grow Old with Me" and "Let Me Count the Ways" were originally meant for inclusion on Double Fantasy. In fact, they were envisioned as the "backbone" of the album. However, Lennon and Ono, working on a tight deadline to get the album finished and released before Christmas, decided to postpone recording the songs until the following year (1981) for the planned Double Fantasy follow-up album, Milk and Honey. This never happened owing to Lennon's murder in December 1980.

Had the song been finished and recorded, Lennon and Ono envisioned "Grow Old with Me" as a "a standard, the kind that they would play in church every time a couple gets married" according to Ono. It was intended to have horns and a symphony as accompaniment.

"Grow Old with Me" had particular importance for Lennon and Ono collaborating on Double Fantasy and Milk and Honey. Womack writes, "In terms of the couple's collaboration, things began once and truly to unfold when Yoko shared her new song, 'Let Me Count the Ways.'" Womack also says of Lennon, "He was especially enamoured with the religiosity inherent in of the middle-eight, singing about a "world without end."" Paul DuNoyer writes that "Grow Old with Me" and "Let Me Count the Ways" are "at the very heart of Milk And Honey."

Of growing older, Ono said in a 1984 interview, "He was looking forward to it. He was always talking about, won't it be great when we're 80 and don't have to struggle any more, sitting in a rocking chair, getting letters from Sean."

Ono spoke about the particular significance of 'Let Me Count the Ways' and 'Grow Old with Me' to Lennon in a 2008 concert. "John told me that he loves me every day. But I was shy and only said, "Yes, thank you very much." So, he was very happy to hear 'Let Me Count the Ways' and he said, "You finally said I love you." And he made the answer song 'Grow Old with Me' for me."

In the 2010 reissue of the album, Ono said of Lennon, "the message of 'Grow Old With Me' could be interpreted in many ways to be his final wish."

== Recording ==
The song was originally written and demo recorded with an acoustic guitar accompaniment. An assistant brought Lennon's Ovation Legend Ltd. 1651 guitar to the island the month prior. Presumably this guitar was used on the original demo recordings. Back in New York at the Dakota, Lennon recorded demos of the song on piano along with a rhythm box.

At the time "Grow Old with Me" was written and the initial demos were made, Lennon was recording on a Sony CF-6500II boom box, referred to as the ZILBA'P, which had been purchased in Bermuda. He also used a National Panasonic RS-4360 DFT, specifically to double track songs.

Overall, several home recordings of the song were made by Lennon. However, all except the one released on Milk and Honey "disappeared." Recorded in the couple's bedroom on a cassette with a piano and rhythm box, this version was the last recording ever made of the song by Lennon and Ono.

== Reissues ==
In 1998, at Ono's request, George Martin created an orchestrated version of the recording, which was released on the John Lennon Anthology box set. The orchestration was recorded at Abbey Road and mixed at Air Studios according to album notes. Martin's son, Giles Martin, plays the bass added to this version. The 1998 version was later included on the compilation Working Class Hero: The Definitive Lennon.

"Grow Old with Me" was remixed and remastered along with the rest of Milk and Honey in 2001. The song and album were remastered again in 2010.

In 2009, an acoustic version and an alternative piano arrangement came to light and now circulate among Lennon collectors. Some of these versions are available on YouTube but have never been officially released.

In 2020 a new mix of the "orchestrated version" was released on the compilation Gimme Some Truth. The song was mixed by Sam Gannon. The John Lennon Twitter account said that the version "used AI technology to isolate John's vocals from the piano and allowed Sean and the team to clean it up further and have more control in the mix."

The version has other significant differences from its predecessors. It starts with a different demo and then introduces Martin's orchestral arrangement after the first chorus, almost a minute into the song. Sean Lennon said "On 'Grow Old With Me,' I wound up having to do a kind of a hybrid of all these three different versions...I made some decisions there arrangement-wise that hadn't been before."

== Personnel ==
Milk and Honey

- John Lennon – vocals, piano, rhythm box

John Lennon Anthology

- John Lennon – vocals, piano, rhythm box
- George Martin – producer, orchestral arrangement
- Giles Martin – assistant producer, bass
- Engineers – Andy Strange, Peter Cobbin, Steve Orchard
- Assistants – Ricky Graham, Chris Clark
- Audio restoration – Tony Cousins, Crispin Murray (Metropolis Mastering)

== Promotion ==
A single release for "Grow Old With Me" was considered. However, it was never issued. In 1984 Stanley Dorfman directed a music video for the song. The video featured home movies of Lennon and Yoko Ono walking in Central Park, Lennon dancing, and other intimate moments from Lennon's personal film archive. The video had its world premiere Sunday, June 3, 1984 on MTV. It was shown as part of a 26-minute program devoted to the Milk and Honey album. The show also premiered the video to 'Borrowed Time' as well as previously shown videos for 'Nobody Told Me' and 'I'm Stepping Out.' It also featured interviews with Ono and Sean Lennon. The video was subsequently contained on the 1992 release The John Lennon Video Collection.

Shortly before the release of Milk and Honey, Yoko Ono is said to have commissioned 70 hand-crafted wood boxes made of Bermuda cedar as Christmas presents for friends and "a select few radio and music personalities." The boxes had an engraved silver plaque that reads "MILK & HONEY, LOVE, YOKO & SEAN, XMAS '83, N.Y.C." The box contained a cassette player that played the home recording of Lennon singing "Grow Old With Me."

== Reception ==
Rolling Stone critic Don Shewey said in a 1984 review that the song had the "stately feel of 'Imagine'" but noted that it was unlikely to become the standard Lennon hoped. Melody Maker said on the album's release "'Grow Old With Me' would surely have been destined to become Lennon's 'Mull of Kintyre.'" New Musical Express said the song was "The LP's most moving moment." The New York Times called it a "moving final testament."

The Los Angeles Times called it “the album's most striking number.” The Boston Globe called it “simply breathtaking.”. The Windsor Star said it was “the centrepiece of the album, stark but beautiful.” The Chicago Tribune called it “an ode to a long-term love Lennon would never enjoy.” The New York Daily News said it was one of Lennon's “most haunting” songs, noting that it had “the erie feel of a crackly old 78, a voice from another world.”

In 2007, Paste Magazine called the song "beautifully ragged." The author said of Lennon "His songs, and his lyrics – from "God is a concept by which we measure our pain," on his first solo album to "God bless our love," on his last one – form one long narrative."

In 2010, Paul Du Noyer wrote of "Grow Old With Me" and "Let Me Count the Ways": "They hold the record in some place out of chronological time, eternally hopeful." DuNoyer continued, ""The sad irony of 'Grow Old With Me' need not be labored... (Lennon's) vocal has the natural intimacy that further studio treatment might have obscured."

In 2013, Ultimate Classic Rock critic Stephen Lewis rated "Grow Old with Me" as Lennon's 2nd greatest solo love song, calling it "as sparse and soul-baring as anything Lennon had done since 1970's Plastic Ono Band.

In 2021, Rip Rense wrote that "Grow Old with Me" was "one of (Lennon's) most loved works." He also noted that, despite the numerous posthumous Lennon versions, it "still feels like a song in search of a finished production."

Reflecting on the 40th anniversary of Milk and Honey's release in 2024, Matt Phillips said in a video review that the demo version "certainly doesn't do the song justice."

== Attempted Beatles version ==
In 1994, Yoko Ono gave Paul McCartney cassettes containing demo recordings of four of John Lennon's unfinished songs: "Grow Old with Me," "Free as a Bird," "Real Love" and "Now and Then." Ono played at least three of the songs, including "Grow Old with Me," for McCartney on a visit to the Dakota.

As late as September 1995, the song was said to be slated for inclusion in an upcoming volume of The Beatles Anthology.

McCartney, George Harrison and Ringo Starr allegedly "worked on all the Lennon songs” before settling on "Free As A Bird" for the first single. However, other sources say that "Grow Old With Me" was never worked on.

Jeff Lynne, who produced "Free As a Bird" and "Real Love," told 'Beatlefan' in 1995 that "There were three tracks altogether" that the surviving Beatles worked on. He was specifically asked if they had worked on "Grow Old with Me" and replied "No. It was only the three." This was prior to the release of the first two songs.

In the same issue of 'Beatlefan', McCartney confirmed to New York Times writer Allan Kozinn that "Grow Old with Me" was among the songs that Ono presented for consideration. When asked if the group planned to work on the song, McCartney said "No. I don't think so, no. We're not that keen on that one." This is all that McCartney said about "Grow Old With Me" in the interview.

'The Beatles Book' subsequently summarized what McCartney said in the 'Beatlefan' interview about potential upcoming reunion songs. It said "Grow Old With Me" was not finished because, in the writer's words, "John's original demo required too much work." This mixed up what McCartney said in the interview about "Now And Then" with "Grow Old With Me." A Beatles reunion website subsequently put this line in quotes, misattributing it to Paul McCartney.

Over the decades, numerous articles, books, videos, and forum posts referenced the line as if it were a direct quote from McCartney about "Grow Old With Me." The quote is also often misattributed to an interview in the New York Times. However, it is not a quote from McCartney, and he made no such statement about the song in his interview with Kozinn.

It is alleged that George Harrison rejected the song. In 2005 Rip Rense wrote that the song was "rumored to be too poignant to handle." Many years later, Rense wrote that the song was not worked on "reportedly because Harrison found it too sad, given Lennon's fate."

In a 2012 documentary on Jeff Lynne, McCartney reconfirmed "There were three that we liked: 'Free As a Bird' and 'Real Love.' So those are the two that we did. And there was another one that we started working on...". That third song eventually became "Now and Then."

Ringo Starr, who recorded the song for a solo album in 2019, told GQ magazine he only learned of the song's existence that year. "I had never heard of the song, and had no awareness of it at all."

== Ringo Starr's version ==
Starr said that he had "no awareness" of the song until shortly before he recorded it in 2019.

Lennon had given Starr tracks for a 1981 album that became Stop and Smell the Roses. However, those songs are said to be "Nobody Told Me" and "Life Begins at 40". It would seem those were the songs Starr could not go through with, with Starr saying in a 1981 interview of the Lennon songs "I won't use them now... they won't be on this album."

Additionally, Ono said "Grow Old With Me" was originally intended to be the "backbone" of the Double Fantasy album before being moved to Milk and Honey. It seems unlikely the song was intended to be given away to Starr, particularly for a separate album by Starr released the same year Milk and Honey would have been were it not for Lennon's death.

Starr said he learned of the song's existence in 2019 from producer Jack Douglas. Douglas told Starr his name was referenced on the so-called Bermuda Tapes. "At the beginning (of the demo, you can hear John say), 'Oh, this would be good for Richard Starkey... this would be great for you, Ring!'" However, Lennonology notes that it is only before the song "Nobody Told Me" that Lennon can be heard making such a statement. In what he announces as Take 2 of that song, Lennon says, "This one's probably for Mr. Richard Starkey, late of the Beatles... This one's gotta be for Ringo."

Additionally, Jack Douglas recalls the conversation with Ringo differently. He says Ringo told him "I had a bunch of John's memorabilia in a box and when I moved, the box disappeared. I don't have that cassette from Bermuda anymore." Douglas had a copy of the tape and supplied it to Ringo, also having it transferred from cassette.

Starr covered "Grow Old with Me" for his 2019 album What's My Name. Paul McCartney sang backing vocals and played bass, with Starr saying "I thought the only guy who could really play bass on this for me was Paul."

Douglas, who produced Lennon's Double Fantasy and Milk and Honey, arranged strings – including a George Harrison musical reference. "And the strings that Jack arranged for this track, if you really listen, they do one line from 'Here Comes the Sun,'" Starr said. "So in a way, it's the four of us". Of his version, Starr said "I did the best I could."

=== Personnel ===
- Ringo Starr – vocals, drums
- Paul McCartney – backing vocals, bass
- Joe Walsh – guitar
- Jim Cox – piano
- Allison Lovejoy – accordion
- Rhea Fowler – violin
- Bianca McClure – violin
- Lauren Baba – violin
- Isaiah Cage – cello
- Jack Douglas – string arrangement

==== Production ====
- Wesley Seidman – assistant engineer

== Other versions ==
As of 2026, the song has been professionally covered over 85 times. This includes pop, rock, country, gospel, and instrumental versions. There are versions sung in Italian, Finnish, and Swedish.

The earliest known cover version was by Foreign Affair in 1984, the same year that Milk and Honey was released. Other early versions were made by Marco Bonino, John Vickers, and The Poles. Morgan Fisher covered the song on the album Echoes of Lennon, Peter Randall on the album Better Times, both in 1990.

Mary Chapin Carpenter recorded it in 1995 on the Lennon tribute album Working Class Hero: A Tribute to John Lennon and it went to #17 on the Billboard Adult Contemporary Chart. It was re-released on her 1999 compilation album, Party Doll and Other Favorites.

Jeanette Lindström recorded a version of the song in 2006 on her album Whistling Away the Dark, as a duo with pianist Jonas Östholm.

Indie pop supergroup The Postal Service recorded a version of the song for the 2007 compilation album Instant Karma: The Amnesty International Campaign to Save Darfur.

Glen Campbell recorded it on his 2008 album Meet Glen Campbell and stated in interviews that he received permission directly from Yoko to record it. He stated, erroneously, that it had never previously been recorded. Campbell also recorded a live version in 2008 that was subsequently released on the Live from the Troubadour album in 2021. He says in the intro that Ono brought him the song and that it had "never been played, never been recorded."

"Grow Old With Me" has also long had fan-created versions uploaded to YouTube and elsewhere. They often reimagine the song as if it were completed by the Beatles. Some of these versions have gained media attention.

== See also ==
- The Beatles Anthology
- The Beatles bootleg recordings
