= Fear Itself =

Fear Itself may refer to:

== Music ==
- Fear Itself (band), a 1960s rock band
- Fear Itself (Fear Itself album) (1969)
- Fear Itself (Casual album) (1994)
- Xenophobe/Fear Itself, a 2015 EP by Zao

== Film and television ==
- Fear Itself (film), a 2015 film by Charlie Lyne
- Fear Itself (TV series), a 2008 NBC horror anthology series
- "Fear Itself" (The Outer Limits), a 1998 episode of The Outer Limits
- "Fear, Itself", a 1999 episode of Buffy the Vampire Slayer
- "Fear Itself" (The 4400), a 2007 episode of The 4400
- "Fear Itself" (K-9), an episode of K-9

== Literature ==
- Fear Itself (Doctor Who novel), a 2005 Doctor Who novel by Nick Wallace
- "Fear Itself" (comics), a 2011 storyline published by Marvel Comics

== Other uses ==
- Fear Itself (role-playing game), published by Pelgrane Press in 2007

== See also ==
- First inauguration of Franklin D. Roosevelt, during which Roosevelt gave the speech that contained the line "the only thing we have to fear is fear itself."
- Nothing to fear but fear itself (disambiguation)
