= Fiyo on the Bayou =

Studio album by the Neville Brothers
- Released: April 1981
- Recorded: Studio in the Country, Bogalusa, LA; Sea-Saint, New Orleans, LA
- Genre: New Orleans R&B, rock and roll, funk, soul
- Length: 35.40
- Label: A&M
- Producer: Joel Dorn

The Neville Brothers chronology
The Neville Brothers (1981)	Fiyo on the Bayou (1981)	Nevilization I (1982)

Fiyo on the Bayou is the second studio album by the New Orleans four piece the Neville Brothers. It was released in 1981 on A&M Records.

The album features background vocals by members of the Persuasions, and by Whitney Houston and her mother Cissy Houston, with soul singer/songwriter Eltesa Weathersby, on the tracks "Fire on the Bayou" and "Sitting in Limbo".

In 1975 another album titled Fire on the Bayou was released by the Meters, a band that included Art Neville on keyboards. "Hey Pocky Way" is a tune heard on the Meters' album, Rejuvenation. The album has also been released by Mobile Fidelity Sound Lab as an Ultradisc gold CD in 1994.

== Critical reception ==
Professional ratings
Review scores
Source	Rating
AllMusic	4.5/5 stars
Robert Christgau	B+
The Rolling Stone Album Guide	4/5 stars

Robert Christgau called the album "an enjoyable way for neophytes to get into the most universal rock and roll style." The Globe and Mail wrote that "the New Orleans brand of pop, more than any other, displays Latin and Caribbean influences that it draws from the islands and continent to the south and adds to the sounds of the blues heartland to the immediate north." Robert Palmer, in The New York Times, listed the album as the 4th best of 1981, writing: "The first family of New Orleans rock 'n' soul, the brilliant horn and string arrangements of Wardell Quezergue and the production expertise of Joel Dorn conspired to make Fiyo on the Bayou an instant classic."

== Track listing ==
1. "Hey Pocky Way" (Ziggy Modeliste, Art Neville, Leo Nocentelli, George Porter, Jr.) - 4:14
2. "Sweet Honey Dripper" (Art Neville) - 5:19
3. "Fire on the Bayou" (Modeliste, Neville, Nocentelli, Porter) - 5:16
4. "Ten Commandments of Love" (Marshall Paul) - 3:45
5. "Sitting in Limbo" (Guilly Bright, Jimmy Cliff) - 4:11
6. "Brother John / Iko Iko" (Cyril Neville/Earl King) - 5:34
7. "Mona Lisa" (Jay Livingston, Ray Evans) - 3:45
8. "Run Joe" (Jordan/Merrick/Willoughby) - 3:36

== Personnel ==
- Art Neville - vocals, keyboards
- Cyril Neville - vocals, keyboards, percussion
- Charles Neville - saxophone, percussion, vocals
- Aaron Neville - vocals, percussion
- Charmaine Neville - vocals
- Babi Floyd - backing vocals
- Carl Blouin - baritone saxophone
- Cissy Houston - backing vocals
- David Newman - saxophone
- David Barard - bass guitar
- Eltesa Weathersby - backing vocals
- Herbert Rhoad - backing vocals
- Herman "Roscoe" Ernest III - drums
- Ivan Neville - percussion
- Jimmy Hayes - backing vocals
- Jayotis Washington - backing vocals
- Jerry Lawson - backing vocals
- Jim Weber - trumpet
- Jimmy Duggan - trombone
- Joe Russell - backing vocals
- Joseph Fox III - trumpet
- Kenneth Williams - percussion
- Leo Nocentelli - guitars
- Mac Rebennack - percussion, keyboards
- Quay Houchen - backing vocals
- Ralph MacDonald - percussion
- Wardell Quezergue - synthesizer, acoustic piano
- Whitney Houston - backing vocals
- Zachary Sanders - backing vocals
