= The Persuasions =

American a cappella group

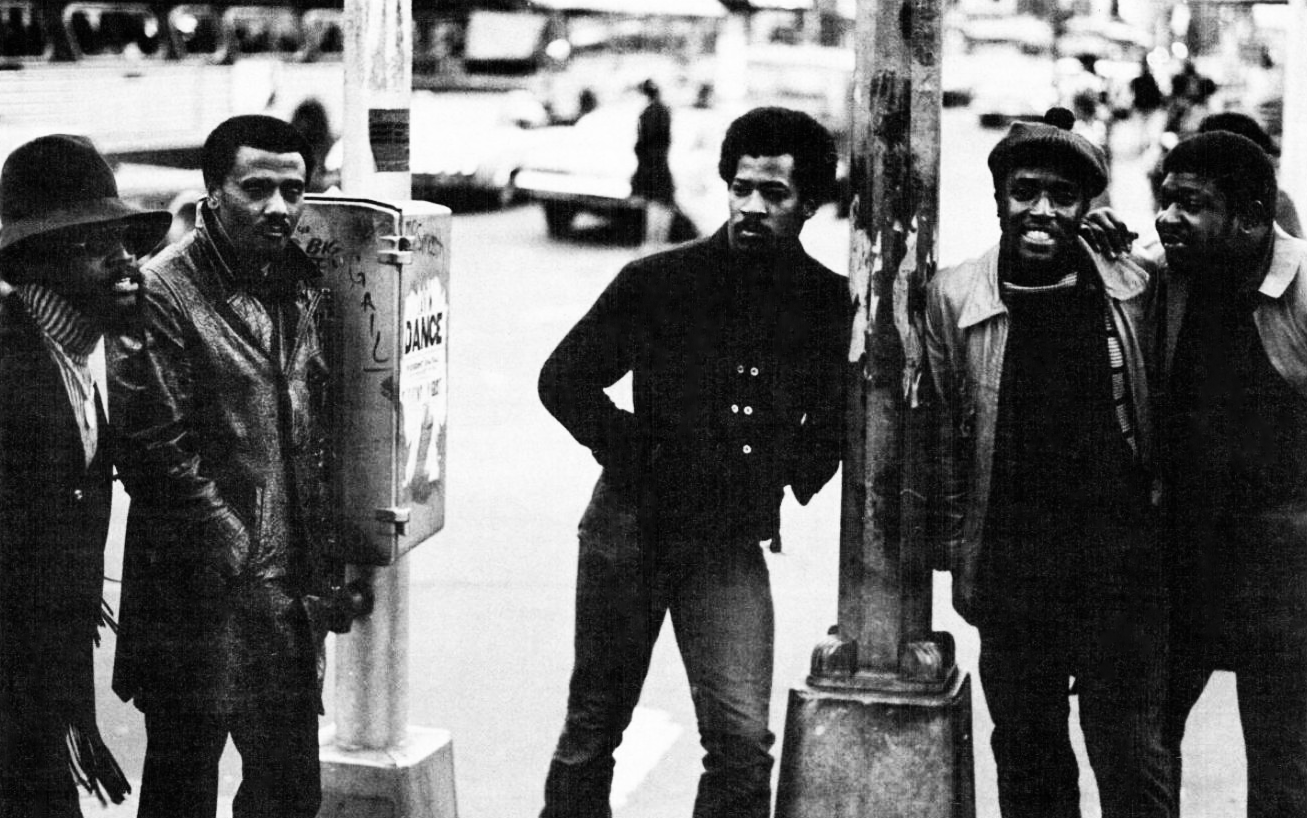
- The Persuasions in 1972

Background information
- Origin: Brooklyn, New York, United States
- Genres: A cappella
- Years active: 1962–2020
- Past members: Jerry Lawson (deceased); Jimmy Hayes (deceased); Herbert (Toubo) Rhoad (deceased); Joe Russell (deceased); Jayotis Washington; Raymond Sanders

The Persuasions were an American a cappella group that formed in Brooklyn, New York in 1962, singing under corner streetlights and in subway corridors. Their style combined gospel, soul, early rock, and jazz into melodic five-part harmonies. Since being discovered by Frank Zappa, the Persuasions have released 23 studio albums to date.

== Career ==
The Persuasions appeared on public affairs television shows, such as Inside Bedford-Stuyvesant on WNEW-TV and Like It Is on WABC-TV in 1968. Frank Zappa was responsible for the Persuasions' first LP, Acappella. He heard the Persuasions singing over the phone from a New Jersey record shop known as Stan's Square Records. The store's owner, Stan Krause, was the group's manager. Before that time, the Persuasions had recorded several a cappella tracks for Krause's record label, Catamount Records.

Zappa appreciated soul and street corner style singing, and after hearing the group, flew them to Los Angeles to record their first album. The Persuasions were the opening act at the Mothers concerts at Carnegie Hall, 1971. Thirty years later, Zappa fan, Rip Rense, supervised and encouraged the group in creating a Persuasions tribute CD to Zappa, Frankly A Cappella on Earthbeat Records. In 1990, the Persuasions performed on the PBS TV special Spike Lee & Company – "Do It A Cappella". The Persuasions later recorded tribute albums consisting of material by the Grateful Dead (Might as Well), and the Beatles (The Persuasions sing the Beatles).

Herbert "Toubo" Rhoad, one of the original members of the Persuasions, died in 1988 while on tour, and Raymond Sanders came in as an additional voice. Sweet Joe Russell died in 2012, bass singer James Caldon Hayes died in May 2017, Jerry Lawson died in July 2019 and Jayotis Washington currently resides in Brooklyn, New York. Groups as varied as Take 6, Rockapella, the Nylons, and Boyz II Men cite the Persuasions as major influences.

== Personnel ==
=== Founding members ===
- Jerry Lawson – tenor, baritone, lead singer, arranger and producer (January 23, 1944, Fort Lauderdale, Florida – July 10, 2019, Phoenix, Arizona)
- Jimmy ‘Bro’ ‘Mr. Bass Man’ Hayes – bass (November 12, 1943, Hopewell, Virginia – May 18, 2017, New York, New York) ex-elevator operator
- Joseph Jesse ‘Sweet Joe’ Russell – second tenor (September 25, 1939, Henderson, North Carolina – May 5, 2012, Brooklyn, New York) ex-butcher
- 'Little' Jayotis Washington – first tenor, baritone (born May 12, 1941, Detroit, Michigan) ex-plumber
- Herbert 'Toubo' Rhoad – baritone (October 1, 1944, Bamberg, South Carolina – December 8, 1988, Sacramento, California) ex-shoe salesman

=== Other members ===
- Willie C. Daniels – second tenor (I Just Want To Sing With My Friends, More Than Before)
- Clifford Dawson – second tenor, first tenor (Knockin' On Bob's Door, Ladies and Gentlemen: Barenaked Ladies and The Persuasions)
- Lawrence Anthony 'L.A.' Grant – bass (touring member)
- Richard Hidlebird – second tenor, baritone (touring member)
- Bernard 'B.J.' Jones – baritone (You're All I Want For Christmas, On the Good Ship Lollipop, The Persuasions Live at McCabe's, Frankly A Cappella: The Persuasions Sing Zappa, Sunday Morning Soul, The Persuasions Sing U2, Knockin' On Bob's Door)
- Elmore Martin (touring member)
- Jimmy Merchant – bass (touring member)
- Reggie Moore – baritone (touring member)
- Dave Revels – lead singer, second tenor, arranger and producer (The Persuasions Sing The Beatles, Knockin' On Bob's Door, Ladies and Gentlemen: Barenaked Ladies and The Persuasions)
- Bev Rohlehr – soprano (No Frills)
- Raymond X. Sanders – first tenor (The Persuasions Live at McCabe's, Frankly A Cappella: The Persuasions Sing Zappa, Might As Well...The Persuasions Sing Grateful Dead, Persuasions of the Dead: Grateful Dead Sessions, A Cappella Dreams, The Persuasions Sing the Beatles, The Persuasions Sing U2, Knockin' On Bob's Door, Ladies and Gentlemen: Barenaked Ladies and The Persuasions)
- Ron Simmons – bass (touring member)
- Gil Torres (touring member)
- Samuel White – baritone, second tenor (Ladies and Gentlemen: Barenaked Ladies and The Persuasions)

== Influences ==
In the liner notes to the 2003 album, A Cappella Dreams, the group revealed their musical influences:

- Sweet Joe Russell references the Dixie Hummingbirds, the Mighty Clouds of Joy, the Soul Stirrers, and "all those gospel greats."
- Jimmy Hayes speaks of Jimmy Ricks (spelled "Rix" in the notes) and Melvin Franklin.
- Jayotis Washington focuses his attention on Louis Jordan.
- Ray Sanders thanks all of the Temptations for his influences.
- Jerry Lawson cites Roy Hamilton, Sam Cooke, Al Hibbler, Brook Benton, and Elvis Presley as his mentors, adding, "Believe it or not, Elvis was a big influence. I thought he was...a fine singer, and I think we do him pretty good."

== In popular culture ==
Steven Spielberg included the Persuasions' cover of Papa Oom Mow Mow in his film E.T. The Extra Terrestrial.

They appeared as musical notes in Blue's Big Musical Movie.

== Discography ==
=== Albums ===
- Stardust (1969 Catamount, CD reissue Relic)
- Acappella (1970 Reprise/Straight)
- We Came To Play (1971 Capitol, CD reissue Collectables)
- Street Corner Symphony (1971 Capitol, CD reissue Collectables)
- Spread the Word (1972 Capitol, CD reissue Collectables)
- We Still Ain't Got No Band (1973 MCA)
- I Just Want To Sing With My Friends (1974; A&M (not yet issued on CD))
- More Than Before (1974; A&M (not yet issued on CD))
- Chirpin' (1977; Elektra, CD reissue Collectables)
- Comin' At Ya (1979; Rounder/Flying Fish)
- Good News (1982; Rounder)
- No Frills (1985; Rounder)
- Do It A Cappella (1990; Elektra)
- Live in the Whispering Gallery (1993; Hammer n' Nails)
- Toúbo's Song (1993; Hammer n' Nails)
- Ships at Sea, Sailors and Shoes (with Ned Sublette & Lawrence Weiner) (1993; Qbadisc/Excellent)
- Right Around the Corner (1994; Rounder/Bullseye Blues)
- Sincerely (1996; Rounder/Bullseye Blues)
- You're All I Want For Christmas (1997; Rounder/Bullseye Blues)
- Man, Oh Man: The Power of the Persuasions (1997; EMI )(1970-72 Capitol masters compilation)
- On the Good Ship Lollipop (1999; Rhino/Kid Rhino/Music for Little People)
- Frankly A Cappella: The Persuasions Sing Zappa (2000; Rhino/EarthBeat)
- Might As Well...The Persuasions Sing Grateful Dead (2000; Arista/Grateful Dead)
- Sunday Morning Soul (2000; Rounder/Bullseye Blues)
- Blue's Big Musical Movie (2000; Rhino/Kid Rhino)
- The Persuasions Sing the Beatles (2002; Chesky)
- A Cappella Dreams (2003; Chesky)
- The Persuasions Sing U2 (2005; Chesky)
- Collectables Classics (2006; Collectables (Box set containing all 1971, 1972, & 1977 releases)
- Essential Recordings: A Cappella Soul (2008; Rounder (1979-86 Rounder/Flying Fish/Bullseye Blues compilation))
- The Persuasions Live at McCabe's (2009; Rensart)
- Knockin' On Bob's Door (2010; Zoho)
- Ladies and Gentlemen: Barenaked Ladies and The Persuasions (with Barenaked Ladies) (2017; Vanguard)

=== Non-album singles ===
- "Party in the Woods" written by Jerry Lawson/"It's Better to Have Loved and Lost" (1968; Minit)
- "One Thing on My Mind"/"Darlin'" (1975; A&M)

=== Guest appearances ===
- 1972 Les McCann - Talk to the People - "What's Going On"
- 1973 Ellen McIlwaine - We the People - "Farther Along"
- 1973 Garland Jeffreys - Garland Jeffreys
- 1974 Phoebe Snow - Phoebe Snow - "Let the Good Times Roll"
- 1974 Stevie Wonder - Fulfillingness' First Finale - "Please Don't Go"
- 1974 David Essex - David Essex
- 1976 David Soul - David Soul - "Bird on a Wire"
- 1978 Melanie - Ballroom Streets - "I Believe"
- 1978 John Hall - John Hall - "Messin' Round the Wrong Woman"
- 1979 Jimmy Dockett - Different Moods
- 1980 Joni Mitchell - Shadows and Light - "Why Do Fools Fall In Love," "Shadows and Light"
- 1981 The Neville Brothers - Fiyo on the Bayou - "The Ten Commandments of Love"
- 1987 Rory Block - Best Blues and Originals - "God's Gift to Women"
- 1989 Roger Christian - Checkmate - "Mwanzia"
- 1990 Various Artists - Spike Lee & Company: Do It a Cappella - "Looking for an Echo", "I'm Going Home on the Morning Train", "Up on the Roof", "Pass on the Love"
- 1991 Various Artists - Zappa's Universe
- 1992 Rockapella - Where in the World Is Carmen Sandiego? - "My Home"
- 1994 Various Artists - September Songs – The Music of Kurt Weill - "Oh, Heavenly Salvation"
- 2000 Paul Pena - New Train - "Gonna Move"
- 2001 Leon Redbone - Any Time - "In the Shade of the Old Apple Tree"

The following various artists recordings contained otherwise unissued Persuasions recordings:

- Various Artists: Bread & Roses: Festival of Acoustic Music (1979; Fantasy)
- Various Artists: Spike & Co. Do It A Cappella (soundtrack) (1990; Elektra)
- Ned Sublette & Lawrence Weiner (with Kim Weston, Junior Mance, et al.): Monsters from the Deep (1997; Qbadisc/Excellent)
