= Honky Tonk Angel (Ellen McIlwaine album) =

Studio album by Ellen McIlwaine
- Released: March 1972
- Recorded: Side A Live at The Bitter End, New York City Side B, tracks 1-3, 5 Record Plant Studios, New York Side B, track 4 Burmese Records Studio, New York
- Length: 37:46
- Label: Polydor (PD-5021)
- Producer: Peter K. Seigel

Ellen McIlwaine chronology
Honky Tonk Angel (1972)	We the People (1973)

Professional ratings
Review scores
Source	Rating
Allmusic	4/5 stars
Christgau's Record Guide	B

Honky Tonk Angel is the 1972 debut solo album by Ellen McIlwaine, following her departure from Fear Itself. The first side of the album contains songs that were recorded live at The Bitter End in New York City while side two of the record is made up of studio recordings.

The album was re-released on CD in 1993 along with McIlwaine's 1973 album We the People as Up From the Skies: The Polydor Years.

== Track listing ==
=== Side A ===
1. "Toe Hold" (Isaac Hayes, David Porter) – 4:32
2. "Weird of Hermiston" (Jack Bruce, Pete Brown) – 5:06
3. "Up From the Skies" (Jimi Hendrix) – 3:52
4. "Losing You" (Ellen McIlwaine) – 2:22
5. "Ode to Billie Joe" (Bobbie Gentry) – 4:13

=== Side B ===
1. "Pinebo (My Story)" (Guy Warren) – 2:41
2. "Can't Find My Way Home" (Steve Winwood) – 3:39
3. "Wings of a Horse" (Ellen McIlwaine) – 4:01
4. "It Wasn't God Who Made Honky Tonk Angels" (J.D. Miller) – 2:38
5. "Wade in the Water" (Traditional, adapted by Ellen McIlwaine) – 4:55

== Personnel ==
- Ellen McIlwaine - vocals, background vocals, guitars
- Thad Holiday - bass, background vocals
- Don Payne - bass (Side B, track 4)
- Billy Curtis - congas (Side A, track 1; Side B, track 1)
- Candido - congas (Side B, tracks 1, 3, 5)
- Don Kaplan - piano
- James Madison - drums
- Bill Keith - pedal steel guitar
