= Woodstock Sound-Outs =

Woodstock Sound-Outs or soundouts were mini-festivals held outside Woodstock, New York from 1967 to 1970. They were the brainchild of John "Jocko" Moffitt, a roofer and drummer. He had heard about a number of folk festivals in his native California, and he wanted to stage a rock festival in a country setting. Planning for the event began in 1966 and by the early spring of 1967 performers like Richie Havens were being tentatively booked.

The first festival was sited at Pan Copeland's farm outside Woodstock—just south of NY Route 212 on Glasco Turnpike. The festival featured over twenty music acts including Richie Havens, Tim Hardin, Billy Batson, Kenny Rankin and Phil Ochs. Two thousand people attended the three-day event and the outdoor concert itself came together so quickly that the greater community was largely unaware that it had taken place. Moffitt co-promoted the event with Steve Bishop.^{1,2}

== 1968 ==
Copeland and Moffitt soon had a falling out. However, Moffitt promoted one final Sound-Out at the Woodstock Playhouse in March 1968. Richie Havens was once again on the bill and such other performers as Jerry Moore, Don Preston, Major Wiley and Bunky and Jake also performed.^{3} Pan Copeland resurrected the festival on her farm that summer and called it the Woodstock Sound Festival. She brought in people including Julius Bruggeman, James Matteson, Jackson C. Frank and others to help promote and run the festivals.^{4}

Sound festivals occurred over the July 4th weekend in 1968, with Tim Hardin, Major Wiley, the Blues Magoos, Chrysalis and Happy & Artie Traum appearing.^{5} Later that month another mini-festival happened on July 19 and 20. Cat Mother & the All Night Newsboys headlined, joined by such other performers as Jerry Jeff Walker, Billy Batson, Happy & Artie Traum, Lothar and the Hand People, Raven, and Soft Machine. In August two more shows were staged. On August 16 and 17 the Colwell-Winfield Blues Band, Cat Mother & the All Night Newsboys, Fear Itself, Don McLean, Rebecca & Sunny Brook Farmers, The Sanjac of Novipazar and Tim Hardin were on the bill.^{6} By this time Bob Fass, host of WBAI's Radio Unnameable, was emceeing and promoting the festivals via the Pacifica airwaves. Over the weekend of August 30, 31 and September 1 the Colwell-Winfield Blues Band, Frank Wakefield, Cat Mother & the All Night Newsboys, Peter Walker, Procol Harum, Scott Fagan and others performed. The Pablo Light Show was present at the July 19 and 20 show, the Pentacle Light Show was scheduled for August 16 and 17 and the Rose Window Light Show for the late August event. Each of these concerts drew from 500 to 1,000 attendees.

== 1969 ==
According to Michael Lang, legendary promoter of the Woodstock Festival of 1969, "the Sound-Outs were kind of the spark for the Woodstock festival. The Sound-Outs just had a great feel, and it was in the country and it provided all the guidelines that I needed, and I was sort of thinking of a broader event but with the same kind of emotional impact."^{7}

By 1969, the Woodstock Sound Festivals were under the direction of Cyril Caster. An ambitious schedule of eight events was planned, but due to inclement weather only one was successfully staged. Performers like Paul Butterfield, Tim Hardin, Happy & Artie Traum, Van Morrison, Children of God, and the Colwell-Winfield Blues Band played at the event that summer.^{8}

== 1970 ==
The following year Ian Hain became president of Woodstock Sound Festival Inc. Working with Pan Copeland, he prepared a schedule of weekly concerts beginning on July 4. After the Woodstock Music & Art Fair at Bethel, the town of Saugerties (within whose boundaries the Sound-Outs had been held) placed on the books a set of laws that prevented promoters from organizing an assemblage of more than 200 without a permit. The acts in 1970 included The Flying Burrito Brothers, Ian & Sylvia and the Great Speckled Bird, Larry Coryell, Ellen McIlwaine, Procol Harum and Holy Moses.

Hain was successful in staging a three-day event over the July 4th weekend. However, due to legal pressure the concert for the July 25 weekend was reduced to one day. Hain was arrested on July 25 when attendees surpassed the allowed limit and reached 210.^{9} He fought his case through the courts, and by September 9 the case was dismissed, but the season was over.^{10}

== 2008 ==
The Sound-Outs at Pan Copeland's fields ended, but the idea lived on and was resurrected in 2008. In that year on August 9 a contemporary Sound-Out was held—in conjunction with Roots of the 1969 Woodstock Festival Backstory Panel Discussion—at the Colony Café in Woodstock, NY. The following acts performed: Hair of the Dog, Peter Walker, Spiv, Jeremy Bernstein, Steve Knight, Joey Eppard, Frankie and his Fingers, Norman Wennet, Mighty Xee, Marian Tortorella, Paul McMahon, Dharma Bums, Tim Moore, Justin Love, Lynn Miller and Sredni Vollmer, Naked and Nathaniel.^{11}

== 2009 ==
For the 40th anniversary of the Woodstock Festival, a Roots of Woodstock Live Concert took place at the Bearsville Theater in Woodstock on August 15, 2009. At this concert several of the old Sound-Out bands were re-united for the first time since the 1960s. Performing that night were the Blues Magoos, Hubert Sumlin and band, Ellen McIlwaine, Marc Black, the Robbie Turner Band, and Jerry Moore with the Children of God. Blues hall of famer Hubert Sumlin had been invited to perform in a nod to Sound-Out alumni Brownie McGhee and Sonny Terry. Woodstock troubadour Marc Black had been strongly influenced by the music of original Sound-Out performer Tim Hardin. Robbie Turner, who had attended the sixties Sound-Outs, played on stage this time around.^{12,13}
