= The Long Weekend EP =

EP by Barenaked Ladies
- Released: 1 July 2014
- Recorded: March 2014
- Genre: Alternative rock
- Length: 12:22
- Label: Raisin
- Producer: Barenaked Ladies

Barenaked Ladies chronology
Grinning Streak (2013)	The Long Weekend EP (2014)	Silverball (2015)

The Long Weekend EP in an EP released by Barenaked Ladies on July 1, 2014. It was released in Canada, though a deluxe edition of Grinning Streak was released in the U.S., containing acoustic versions of "Odds Are", "Smile" and "Blame It On Me". The live version of "Did I Say That Out Loud?" was not included on the U.S. version.

== Recording ==
The acoustic tracks were recorded in early 2014 at bassist Jim Creeggan's home in Toronto. The band posted weekly "Webisodes", including behind-the-scenes footage of the recording sessions for the EP on their official YouTube channel. The EP was produced by Barenaked Ladies, mixed and engineered by Kenny Luong and mastered by Harry Hess at HBomb Mastering.

== Track listing ==
No.	Title	Writer(s)	Length
1.	"Odds Are" (Acoustic)	Kevin Griffin, Ed Robertson	3:05
2.	"Smile" (Acoustic)	Robertson	2:35
3.	"Blame It On Me" (Acoustic)	Steven Page, Robertson	4:43
4.	"Did I Say That Out Loud?" (Live)	Griffin, Robertson	2:39
Total length:			12:22
