= Ladies and Gentlemen: Barenaked Ladies and The Persuasions =

Studio album by Barenaked Ladies and The Persuasions
- Released: April 14, 2017
- Recorded: October 23–24, 2016
- Length: 49:35
- Label: Vanguard
- Producer: Gavin Brown

Barenaked Ladies chronology
BNL Rocks Red Rocks (2016)	Ladies and Gentlemen: Barenaked Ladies and The Persuasions (2017)	Fake Nudes (2017)

The Persuasions chronology
Essential Recordings: A Cappella Soul (2008)	Ladies and Gentlemen: Barenaked Ladies and The Persuasions (2017)

Professional ratings
Review scores
Source	Rating
Allmusic	4/5 stars
Digital Journal	A
The Washington Times	Positive

Ladies and Gentlemen: Barenaked Ladies and The Persuasions is a collaborative album between Canadian rock band Barenaked Ladies and New York a cappella group The Persuasions. The album was released on April 14, 2017. The album consists of fourteen re-worked songs from Barenaked Ladies' back catalog, plus a cover of The Persuasions' song "Good Times".

== Production ==
After playing two songs together in New York City on the Last Summer on Earth 2016 tour, both parties agreed that they would like to collaborate. This resulted in a two-day session from October 23 to 24, with Gavin Brown producing, at Noble Street Studios in Toronto. The album was made available for pre-order on March 10, 2017. Pre-orders of the album came with an instant download of "Don't Shuffle Me Back", "The Old Apartment", "Keepin' It Real" and "Odds Are".

== Track listing ==
No.	Title	Writer(s)	Lead vocals	Length
1.	"Narrow Streets"	Jim Creeggan	Creeggan	2:31
2.	"Gonna Walk"	Kevin Griffin/Ed Robertson	Robertson	2:40
3.	"Don't Shuffle Me Back"	Kevin Hearn	Jimmy Hayes/Hearn	3:16
4.	"The Old Apartment"	Steven Page/Robertson	Clifford Dawson	3:13
5.	"Keepin' it Real"	Robertson	Robertson	4:11
6.	"For You"	Page/Robertson	Robertson	3:46
7.	"Some Fantastic"	Page/Robertson	Dave Revels/Robertson	4:33
8.	"Good Times"	Ted Daryll/Robertson	Revels/Robertson	4:01
9.	"Odds Are"	Griffin/Robertson	Robertson	3:09
10.	"Sound of Your Voice"	Hearn	Dawson/Hearn	2:47
11.	"When I Fall"	Page/Robertson	Robertson	4:05
12.	"Maybe Katie"	Creeggan/Page/Robertson	Creeggan/The Persuasions/Robertson	3:07
13.	"One Week"	Robertson	The Persuasions/Robertson	3:08
14.	"Four Seconds"	Ian LeFeuvre/Robertson	The Persuasions/Robertson	2:50
15.	"I Can Sing"	Robertson	Robertson	2:17

== Personnel ==
Barenaked Ladies

- Jim Creeggan – bass, background vocals, lead vocal on "Narrow Streets" and "Maybe Katie"
- Kevin Hearn – piano, synthesizers, acoustic and electrics guitars, background vocals, lead vocal on "Don't Shuffle Me Back" and "Sound of Your Voice"
- Ed Robertson – lead vocals, acoustic and electric guitars, background vocals
- Tyler Stewart – drums, background vocals

The Persuasions

- Jimmy Hayes – bass vocals, lead vocal on "Don't Shuffle Me Back"
- Jayotis Washington – baritone vocals
- Dave Revels – lead vocal on "Some Fantastic" and "Good Times"
- Clifford Dawson – 2nd tenor vocals, lead vocal on "The Old Apartment" and "Sound of Your Voice"
- Raymond Sanders – 1st tenor vocals
- Samuel White – baritone vocals

Production

- Produced by Gavin Brown
- Recorded and mixed by Lenny Derose
- Assisted by Alex Krotz, Kevin O'Leary and Trevor Anderson
- Pro Tools Sith-Lord: David Mohacsi
- Digital editing by Ryan Theissen, Christian Fedele and Shaddy Roman
- Mastered by Harry Hess at HBomb Mastering
- Photography: Matt Barnes for thatsthespot.com
- Art Direction: Chris Bilheimer
- Management: Alison Taylor for ATwork Management
- Legal: Len Glickman and Stephen Henderson (Cassels Brock, Toronto)
- Business Management: Kenna Danyliw, Danyliw & Mann
- Persuasions Management: David Backer, Backer Entertainment

== Charts ==
Chart (2017)	Peak position
Canadian Albums (Billboard)	87
US Independent Albums (Billboard)	30
