= Fake Nudes =

Studio album by Barenaked Ladies
- Released: 17 November 2017
- Recorded: January – February 2017
- Genre: Alternative rock
- Length: 48:56
- Label: Vanguard
- Producer: Gavin Brown

Barenaked Ladies chronology
Ladies and Gentlemen: Barenaked Ladies and The Persuasions (2017)	Fake Nudes (2017)	Fake Nudes: Naked (2019)

Singles from Fake Nudes
- 1. "Lookin' Up" Released: 8 September 2017

Professional ratings
Review scores
Source	Rating
ABC News	4/5 stars
AllMusic	4/5 stars

Fake Nudes is the twelfth studio album by Canadian rock band Barenaked Ladies. It is the band's twelfth full-length original-material studio album and their 16th overall. It was recorded from January to February 2017 at Noble Street Studios in Toronto, Ontario, and was released on 17 November 2017 through Vanguard.

The album was formally announced on 5 September 2017 and was made available for pre-order on 8 September 2017. Online pre-orders include six instant-gratification downloads, released two per month (including two on the pre-order date): "Bringing It Home", and the lead single, "Lookin' Up". The album's lead song, "Canada Dry", was released for download on 22 September 2017. "Invisible Fence" was released for streaming on 5 October 2017, then for download the following day. "We Took The Night" was made available for download on 21 October 2017. The final pre-release song, "Sunshine", was released for streaming on 2 November 2017, then for download the following day. The band recorded the album with producer Gavin Brown, who has produced several recordings for the band and its members since 2013.

Fake Nudes was also released physically on CD and vinyl. The song "20/20 Hindsight" was deleted from the vinyl version of the album.

The title Fake Nudes is a parody of the term "fake news" while indirectly referencing the band's name.

== Singles ==
The lead single from the album, "Lookin' Up", was made available for download, alongside "Bringing It Home" on the pre-order date of 8 September 2017. The official music video was produced by Rooster Teeth, who have produced a number of the band's music videos since Grinning Streak in 2013.

A music video for "Bringing It Home", combining both studio footage and live footage (the latter filmed during the Fall 2017 "Canada 1 Five 0" Canadian tour) was posted to the band's Facebook page on 17 November 2017. A video for "Navigate" was also released on 25 June 2019.

== Track listing ==
No.	Title	Writer(s)	Lead vocal(s)	Length
1.	"Canada Dry"	Ed Robertson; Kevin Griffin	Ed Robertson	3:09
2.	"Bringing It Home"	Robertson; Griffin	Ed Robertson	3:04
3.	"Invisible Fence"	Kevin Hearn	Kevin Hearn	2:49
4.	"Lookin' Up"	Robertson; Griffin; Sam Hollander	Ed Robertson	2:50
5.	"Sunshine"	Robertson; Hearn	Ed Robertson	3:56
6.	"Dusty Rooms"	Hearn	Kevin Hearn	3:20
7.	"We Took the Night"	Jim Creeggan	Jim Creeggan	2:14
8.	"Navigate"	Robertson; Hearn	Ed Robertson	4:43
9.	"Flying Dreams"	Hearn	Kevin Hearn	4:33
10.	"Nobody Better"	Robertson; Hearn	Ed Robertson	3:02
11.	"Bag of Bones"	Hearn	Kevin Hearn	3:37
12.	"You + Me vs. the World"	Robertson; Griffin	Ed Robertson	3:37
13.	"20/20 Hindsight"	Hearn	Kevin Hearn	3:52
14.	"The Township of King"	Hearn	Kevin Hearn	4:09
Total length:				48:56

== Personnel ==
Barenaked Ladies

- Jim Creeggan – bass, lead and background vocals
- Kevin Hearn – piano, synthesizers, keyboards, acoustic and electric guitars, lead and background vocals
- Ed Robertson – lead and backing vocals, acoustic and electric guitars
- Tyler Stewart – drums, percussion, background vocals

Additional musicians

- Steve Berlin – saxophone on "Bag of Bones" and "Lookin' Up"
- Jim Cuddy – additional vocals on "Canada Dry"
- Bill Dillon – additional guitars on "Navigate"
- Alan Doyle – additional vocals on "Canada Dry"
- Patrick Hearn – spoken word on "Dusty Rooms"
- Michael Ray – trumpet on "Bag of Bones", "Lookin' Up" and "Invisible Fence"
- Tanya Tagaq – additional vocals on "Flying Dreams"

Production

- Produced by Gavin Brown
- Recorded by Lenny DeRose
- Additional Engineering by Alex Krotz and David Mohacsi
- Assistant Engineer: Alex Krotz
- Pro Tools Sith Lord: David Mohacsi
- Digital Editing: Ryan Thiessen, Shaddy Roman and Christian Fedele
- Mixed by Howie Beck at Studio H Sound
- Mastered by Stewart Whitmore and Stephen Marcussen at Marcussen Mastering
- Photography: Matt Barnes
- Package design: Antoine Moonen

== Charts ==
Chart (2017)	Peak position
Canadian Albums (Billboard)	24
Scottish Albums (Official Charts)	83
US Top Rock Albums (Billboard)	48
