= In Flight =

In Flight may refer to:

- In Flight (Alvin Lee album)
- In Flight (Barenaked Ladies album)
- In Flight (Linda Perry album)
- In Flight (George Benson album)
- In Flight, an album by Design (UK band)
- In Flight (TV series)
