= BNL Rocks Red Rocks =

Live album by Barenaked Ladies
- Released: 20 May 2016
- Recorded: 10 June 2015
- Genre: Alternative rock
- Length: 60:03
- Label: Vanguard Records
- Producer: Barenaked Ladies

Barenaked Ladies chronology
Silverball (2015)	BNL Rocks Red Rocks (2016)	Ladies and Gentlemen: Barenaked Ladies and The Persuasions (2017)

BNL Rocks Red Rocks is the third official live album from Canadian band Barenaked Ladies. The album was formally announced on 1 February 2016 via the band's official Twitter page and was released on 20 May 2016. It was recorded at Red Rocks Amphitheatre to promote the release of Silverball on the Last Summer on Earth 2015 tour, The band held a Last Summer on Earth 2016 tour with Orchestral Manoeuvres in the Dark and Howard Jones in conjunction with the new live album. This is the band's first commercial live release since the departure of Steven Page in 2009.

An instant download of "Odds Are" from the album was provided for those who purchased tickets to the Last Summer on Earth 2016 tour. Ticket buyers also received a download of the full album upon its release.

The album was made available for pre-order on 8 April 2016. Those who pre-ordered the album received an instant download of "The Old Apartment", "Odds Are", "Gonna Walk" and "One Week". The band also uploaded videos of these performances on their official YouTube channel, with the exception of "One Week", which received an official lyric video.

== Track listing ==
All tracks are written by Steven Page and Ed Robertson, except where noted.
All lead vocals performed by Ed Robertson, except where noted.

No.	Title	Writer(s)	Lead Vocal(s)	Length
1.	"Get Back Up"	Kevin Griffin; Ed Robertson		3:11
2.	"The Old Apartment"			3:42
3.	"Odds Are"	Kevin Griffin; Ed Robertson		3:11
4.	"Gonna Walk"	Kevin Griffin; Ed Robertson		3:22
5.	"Brian Wilson"	Steven Page		4:07
6.	"Who Can It Be Now?"	Colin Hay	Colin Hay	4:52
7.	"Falling for the First Time"			5:12
8.	"Passcode"	Kevin Hearn	Kevin Hearn	2:47
9.	"Light Up My Room"			4:25
10.	"Duct Tape Heart"	Kevin Griffin; Ed Robertson		3:13
11.	"Pinch Me"			4:46
12.	"Big Bang Theory Theme"	Ed Robertson		1:49
13.	"One Week"	Ed Robertson	Kevin Hearn; Ed Robertson; Tyler Stewart	3:26
14.	"If I Had $1,000,000"		Kevin Hearn; Ed Robertson	6:36
15.	"Drawing"	Kevin Hearn	Tyler Stewart	2:36
16.	"Rock and Roll"	John Bonham; John Paul Jones; Jimmy Page; Robert Plant	Tyler Stewart	2:48
Total length:				60:03

Songs performed but not included are "Say What You Want", "Matter of Time" and "Did I Say That Out Loud?".

== Personnel ==
Barenaked Ladies

- Ed Robertson – Acoustic guitar, electric guitar, lead vocals, backup vocals
- Tyler Stewart – Drums, percussion, backup vocals, lead vocal on "Drawing" and "Rock and Roll"
- Jim Creeggan – Double bass, electric bass, backup vocals
- Kevin Hearn – Accordion, acoustic guitar, electric guitar, electric piano, keyboards, piano, synthesizer, backup vocals, lead vocal on "Passcode"

Additional musicians

- Colin Hay – Acoustic guitar and lead vocal on "Who Can It Be Now?"
- Blaise Garza – Saxophone on "Who Can It Be Now?"

Production

- Produced by Barenaked Ladies
- Mixed by Lenny Derose, assisted by Alex Krotz
- Mastered by Harry Hess at Hbomb Mastering
- Package design: Chris Bilheimer
- Direction: Alison Taylor, Atwork Management
- US booking agent: Larry Webman, Paradigm Agency
- Business management: Kenna Danyliw & Mann

== Charts ==
Year	Chart	Position
2016	US Billboard 200	101
2016	Digital Albums	16
2016	Top Album Sales	38
2016	Top Rock Albums	14
2016	Alternative Albums	11
