= Goddess of Slide =

2024 Canadian documentary film

- Directed by: Alfonso Maiorana
- Written by: Alfonso Maiorana
- Produced by: Agata De Santis; Alfonso Maiorana
- Starring: Ellen McIlwaine
- Cinematography: Alfonso Maiorana
- Edited by: Fannie Daoust; Jaclyn Lee
- Production company: Soul Flicker Films
- Release date: September 20, 2024 (CIFF)
- Running time: 88 minutes
- Country: Canada
- Language: English

Goddess of Slide: The Forgotten Story of Ellen McIlwaine is a Canadian documentary film, directed by Alfonso Maiorana and released in 2024. The film is a portrait of Ellen McIlwaine, an American-born slide guitarist who became a significant figure in Canadian music after moving to Canada in the 1980s.

The film entered production in February 2021, but Maiorana's original plan to feature extensive interviews with McIlwaine herself were upended when she died of cancer just a few months later. Instead he travelled extensively to interview other musicians and industry figures about McIlwaine's career and artistic legacy, including Taj Majal, Ani DiFranco, Melissa Auf der Maur, Amanda Marshall, Jennifer Batten and Colin Linden. He carried McIlwaine's cremains with him through the entire interview process in order to keep her as a part of the film.

The film premiered at the 2024 Calgary International Film Festival. It received a television broadcast on Documentary, and was added to the CBC Gem streaming platform, in March 2025.

The film received a nomination for the DGC Allan King Award for Best Documentary Film at the 2025 Directors Guild of Canada awards.
