= Silverball (album) =

Studio album by Barenaked Ladies
- Released: 2 June 2015
- Recorded: December 2014–February 2015
- Genre: Alternative rock
- Length: 45:10
- Label: Vanguard Records
- Producer: Gavin Brown

Barenaked Ladies chronology
The Long Weekend EP (2014)	Silverball (2015)	BNL Rocks Red Rocks (2016)

Singles from Silverball
- 1. "Say What You Want" Released: 28 April 2015; 2. "Silverball" Released: 4 May 2015; 3. "Duct Tape Heart" Released: 10 July 2015

Silverball is the 11th full-length original-material studio album by Barenaked Ladies. The album was released on 2 June 2015. The album was recorded in late 2014 and early 2015 with producer Gavin Brown.

The cover art depicts a pinball sitting on a pinball table surface, reflecting the darkened figure of a man playing. Lead singer and guitarist Ed Robertson, an acknowledged longtime video game fanatic turned his interest towards pinball in the 2010s, amassing a collection of machines. The inspiration of the name Silverball came from the giant glitterball which hung above the floor of the O2 ABC venue in Glasgow, Scotland. Which the band relayed as one of their favourite venues. The venue itself has since burned down and is no longer in use - it is believed the glitterball was destroyed in the fire.

Best Buy offered a retailer-exclusive limited-time edition of the album in the U.S. including "Counting Down" and "Fall Back On", two songs which were initially cut from the album. Both songs are exclusive to Spotify in Canada, who also offer a track-by-track commentary by the band for the album.

The album was released on vinyl on 31 July 2015. BNL Rocks Red Rocks, a live album recorded at Red Rocks Amphitheatre during the tour for Silverball, was released 20 May 2016.

== Reception ==
Professional ratings
Review scores
Source	Rating
AllMusic	3.5/5 stars
PopMatters	7/10 stars
The Toronto Star	2.5/4 stars

In Canada, the album debuted with 4,000 copies sold in its first week of release.

In the U.S., the album debuted at No. 46 on the Billboard 200, and No. 5 on Top Rock Albums chart, selling 11,000 copies in its first week. The album has sold 28,000 copies in the United States as of April 2016.

== Track listing ==
No.	Title	Writer(s)	Lead vocal(s)	Length
1.	"Get Back Up"	Ed Robertson; Kevin Griffin	Ed Robertson	3:02
2.	"Here Before"	Robertson	Robertson	3:55
3.	"Matter of Time"	Robertson	Robertson	3:36
4.	"Duct Tape Heart"	Robertson; Griffin	Robertson	3:03
5.	"Say What You Want"	Robertson	Robertson	3:35
6.	"Passcode"	Kevin Hearn	Hearn	2:35
7.	"Hold My Hand"	Robertson	Robertson	3:59
8.	"Narrow Streets"	Jim Creeggan	Creeggan	2:55
9.	"Toe to Toe"	Robertson	Robertson	3:16
10.	"Piece of Cake"	Robertson	Robertson	3:24
11.	"Globetrot"	Robertson	Robertson	3:28
12.	"Silverball"	Robertson	Robertson	4:36
13.	"Tired of Fighting with You"	Hearn	Hearn	3:46
Total length:				45:10

Best Buy bonus tracks
No.	Title	Writer(s)	Lead vocal(s)	Length
14.	"Counting Down"	Robertson	Robertson	3:27
15.	"Fall Back On"	Robertson	Robertson	3:24

== Singles ==
The lead single, "Say What You Want", was made available for streaming on 27 April 2015. On 4 May 2015, a video for "Silverball" was released as a thank you from Robertson to the community of the pinball website Pinside.com for their technical assistance with his pinball machines. It was released for digital download the following day. A lyric video for "Duct Tape Heart" was released 10 July 2015. The official music video for "Duct Tape Heart", containing live footage of the band's performance at Red Rocks Amphitheatre on the Last Summer On Earth 2015 tour, was released on 19 October 2015 to coincide with the start of the Canadian leg of the Silverball tour.

== Personnel ==
- Jim Creeggan – Electric bass, background vocals, lead vocal on "Narrow Streets"
- Kevin Hearn – Piano, synthesizers, keyboards, acoustic and electric guitars, background vocals, lead vocal on "Passcode" and "Tired of Fighting With You"
- Ed Robertson – Lead vocals, acoustic and electric guitars, banjo, background vocals
- Tyler Stewart – Drums, percussion, mouth guitar, background vocals

Additional:

- Tim Bovaconti – Pedal steel on "Fall Back On"
- Mike Evin – Keyboards on "Counting Down"
- Lyle Herbert-Robertson – Electric guitar solo on "Piece of Cake"
- Hugh Marsh – Electric violin on "Duct Tape Heart", "Matter of Time", "Piece of Cake" and "Tired of Fighting With You"
- Perry White – Saxophone on "Passcode"

== Charts ==
Chart (2015)	Peak position
Canadian Albums (Billboard)	3
US Billboard 200	46
US Digital Albums (Billboard)	13
US Independent Albums (Billboard)	5
US Top Rock Albums (Billboard)	5
