= We the People (Ellen McIlwaine album) =

Studio album by Ellen McIlwaine
- Released: January 1973
- Recorded: Record Plant Studios, New York City; Carnegie Hall, New York (side b, track 5)
- Length: 32:33
- Label: Polydor (PD-5044)
- Producer: Peter K. Seigel

Ellen McIlwaine chronology
Honky Tonk Angel (1972)	We the People (1973)	The Real Ellen McIlwaine (1975)

Professional ratings
Review scores
Source	Rating
Allmusic	4.5/5 stars

We the People is a 1973 album by Ellen McIlwaine.

The album was re-released on CD in 1993 along with McIlwaine's 1972 debut album Honky Tonk Angel as Up From the Skies: The Polydor Years.

== Track listing ==
All tracks are written by Ellen McIlwaine except where noted.

=== Side A ===
1. "Ain't No Two Ways About It (It's Love)" – 4:26
2. "All to You" – 3:05
3. "Sliding" – 2:52
4. "Never Tell Your Mother She's Out of Tune" (Jack Bruce, Pete Brown) – 2:25
5. "Farther Along" (Traditional) – 3:44

=== Side B ===
1. "I Don't Want to Play" – 3:20
2. "Underground River" – 3:54
3. "Everybody Wants To Go To Heaven (But Nobody Wants To Die)" (Al Fields, Tom Delaney, Timmie Rogers) – 2:25
4. "Jimmy Jean" – 2:59
5. "We the People" – 3:23

== Personnel ==
- Ellen McIlwaine - vocals, guitar, piano
- Don Payne - bass
- Don Moore - bass (Side B, track 4)
- Jimmy Madison - drums (Side A, track 2; Side B, tracks 1–3)
- Jerry Mercer - drums (Side A, tracks 1, 4)
- Colin Tilton - saxophone
- Candido - conga
- West 44th Street Noise Choir - background vocals (Side B, track 1)
- The Persuasions - background vocals on (Side A, track 5)
