= Nobody Told Me =

1984 posthumous single by John Lennon

- US picture sleeve

Single by John Lennon

from the album Milk and Honey
- B-side: "O' Sanity" (Yoko Ono); "I'm Stepping Out" (1990 and 1992)
- Released: 6 January 1984; 30 April 1990 (re-issue) and 1992 (re-issue)
- Recorded: 1980, 1983
- Genre: Rock
- Length: 3:35
- Label: Polydor
- Songwriter: John Lennon
- Producers: John Lennon; Yoko Ono

John Lennon singles chronology
"Love" (1982)	"Nobody Told Me" (1984)	"Borrowed Time" (1984)

"Nobody Told Me" is a song by the English musician John Lennon. The B-side features Yoko Ono's "O' Sanity"; both are on the Milk and Honey album. The promo video for the single was made up of clips of footage from Lennon's other videos, as are most posthumous Lennon videos.

The single was Lennon's last new single to reach the UK top 10, peaking at number 6 in January 1984 (although a reissue of "Imagine" reached number 3 in December 1999). It was also Lennon's last US top 10 hit, peaking at number 5 on the Billboard Hot 100 and number 6 on the Cashbox Top 100, and was his third single to enter the US top 10 posthumously.

== Writing ==
The lyrics reference the yellow idol in J. Milton Hayes' poem The Green Eye of the Yellow God. The first stanza of the poem runs: "There's a one-eyed yellow idol to the north of Kathmandu." (Note: Also notice that the radio programme The Goon Show (1951-1960), a Lennon's favourite, has an episode where the characters joke around the phrase: "There's a little yellow idol to the north of Kathmandu" using the adjective "little" as the song lyrics.)

Another line in the song is "There's UFOs over New York and I ain't too surprised". In the liner notes to his 1974 album Walls and Bridges, Lennon wrote: "On the 23rd August 1974 at 9 o'clock I saw a U.F.O. – J.L.". May Pang, John's girlfriend at the time, described the event in her book Loving John, when both of them saw a "saucer-shaped object surrounded by blinking white lights gliding through the sky".

The lines "Nobody told me there'd be days like these / Strange days indeed / Most peculiar, mama" are in contrast to the old adage "My mother told me there'd be days like this" (as in The Shirelles' song "Mama Said").

Yoko Ono called the track "kind of a fun song." She told Uncut in 1998: "I think that especially around that time he felt that again, the world had lost its course, its direction. I really think that it's to do with, not confusion but starting to learn that life is always gonna be a mystery."

== Recording ==
Recorded but left incomplete shortly before his death in 1980, the song was later completed by Lennon's widow Yoko Ono in 1983 and released as the first single from Lennon and Ono's album Milk and Honey in 1984. The song was later re-released in the US in 1990 (Polydor, 883 927-4) and 1992 (Collectables COL 4307) with "I'm Stepping Out" on the B-side. The song was originally written for Ringo Starr to include on his 1981 album, Stop and Smell the Roses, but due to Lennon's death, Starr decided not to record it.

A promo video for "Nobody Told Me" was compiled in 2003 for the DVD Lennon Legend: The Very Best of John Lennon, featuring Lennon and Ono in archival footage from the early 1970s. The majority of the video's content was edited from newly transferred footage and out-takes from Lennon and Ono's 1972 film Imagine. Also featured in the music video are Phil Spector, George Harrison, Dick Cavett, Fred Astaire, Andy Warhol and Miles Davis.

== Reception ==
Cash Box said that "a melodic cross between 'Just Like Starting Over' and 'Instant Karma', the song begins with a hearty 'one-two-three-four' and launches into an inspiring, sentimental and memorable ode to the world, the human race, and Lennon's own consciousness."

== Personnel ==
- John Lennon – vocals, rhythm guitar
- Earl Slick, Hugh McCracken – lead guitar
- Tony Levin – bass
- George Small – keyboards
- Andy Newmark – drums
- Arthur Jenkins – percussion

== Chart performance ==
=== Weekly charts ===
Chart (1984)	Peak position
Australia (Kent Music Report)	6
Canada RPM Top Singles	4
Germany	55
Italy (Musica e Dischi)	20
Netherlands	13
New Zealand	30
Norway	7
Ireland (IRMA)	5
Luxembourg (Radio Luxembourg)	3
UK Singles (OCC)	6
US Billboard Hot 100	5
US Billboard Adult Contemporary	11
US Cash Box Top 100	6

=== Year-end charts ===
Chart (1984)	Rank
Australia (Kent Music Report)	81
Canada	44
US Top Pop Singles (Billboard)	81
US Cash Box	47

== Cover versions ==
- The Flaming Lips recorded a version for the 1995 John Lennon tribute album Working Class Hero: A Tribute to John Lennon.
- The 2007 benefit album Instant Karma: The Amnesty International Campaign to Save Darfur contained a version by Big & Rich.
- In 2025, Turkish singer Murat Evgin made a cover of the song for the TV series Pluribus, which was used for the credits theme in its second episode "Pirate Lady".
