= Jerry Lawson (musician) =

American musical artist (1944–2019)

- Born: Jerome Eugene Lawson; January 23, 1944; Fort Lauderdale, Florida, U.S.
- Origin: Apopka, Florida
- Died: July 10, 2019 (aged 75) Phoenix, Arizona, U.S.
- Genres: A cappella, pop, soul, blues-rock, gospel, R&B, jazz, rock standards
- Occupations: Singer, musical arranger, performer, producer
- Instrument: Vocals
- Years active: 1969–2019
- Website: http://jerrylawson.biz

Jerome Eugene Lawson (January 23, 1944 – July 10, 2019) was an American singer, producer, musical arranger and performer, best known as the original lead singer of the Persuasions.

== Career ==
=== The Persuasions ===
Jerry Lawson was the original lead singer, arranger and producer of the a cappella group the Persuasions. In the 1970s, with Lawson on lead vocals, the Persuasions had five albums in the Billboard Top R&B Albums charts and four in the Billboard 200 charts:

- We Came to Play (1971) – No. 32, Billboard R&B; No. 189, Billboard 200
- Spread the Word (1972) – No. 40, Billboard R&B; No. 195, Billboard 200
- Street Corner Symphony (1972) – No. 16, Billboard R&B; No. 88, Billboard 200
- We Still Ain't Got No Band (1973) – No. 49, Billboard R&B; No. 178, Billboard 200
- More Than Before (1974) – No. 52, Billboard R&B

In 2000, Lawson, along with the rest of the Persuasions, performed in the Blue's Clues film Blue's Big Musical Movie.

=== Beyond the Persuasions ===
In 2003, after four decades and 22 albums, Lawson left the Persuasions. Vowing that his a cappella days were over, Lawson moved to Arizona with his wife, got his first day job in 40 years and began working with developmentally disabled adults, while his wife worked to establish him as a solo artist. He began to work with jazz combos and big bands, and eventually made plans to record with the Moscow Philharmonic Orchestra.

In 2004, Lawson was introduced to four members of the San Francisco-based a cappella group Talk of the Town (Rayfield Ragler, Stan Lockwood, Paul Carrington and Carl Douglas), who had spent 35 years studying Lawson's recordings and wishing they had a lead singer like him. Upon his wife's urging, Lawson became lead singer for the group. He was so impressed with their rendition of "Paper Doll" by the Mills Brothers that he and his wife were compelled to join forces with the vocalists to produce what Lawson considered to be the masterpiece of his a cappella career.

In 2007, they independently released the album Jerry Lawson & Talk of the Town. While reminiscent of the Persuasions, the sound was noticeably different, with more focus on a single lead singer and tighter group harmony. The album features several guest performers, including former Rockapella lead singer Sean Altman, Lawson's daughter Yvette, singing lead on track 8, and his wife, manager and co-producer Julie, closing the album with the group, summing up their 34 years together.

On September 9, 2005, in response to Hurricane Katrina, Lawson and Talk of the Town performed "People Get Ready" with Rod Stewart in the Katrina benefit telecast Shelter from the Storm: A Concert for the Gulf Coast.

Since 2007, one of the most requested videos on children's television network Noggin has been Lawson's video of "I'm Glad", which he first recorded with the Persuasions and performed for the Noggin television series Jack's Big Music Show with Talk of the Town.

In 2008, during the US presidential campaign, Lawson teamed up again with Talk of the Town to record a re-working of the Dixie Chicks' song "I Hope" (which had appeared with the song's original lyrics on the Jerry Lawson & Talk of the Town album), as a tribute to then presidential candidate Barack Obama.

In 2009, Lawson collaborated with singer/songwriter James Power on a tribute recording to gospel legend Reverend Claude Jeter of the Swan Silvertones, on a track titled "The Man in Room 1009".

In 2010, Lawson appeared in a documentary on the art of a cappella music titled "A Lesson in A Cappella", by filmmaker/director Keith Lewis. In this documentary, Lawson discusses the evolution and future of the musical art form and performs several a cappella songs. His performances are with Talk of the Town, with a bonus feature with Power. Later that year, Lawson and Talk of the Town were invited to participate in season 2 of the NBC television series The Sing-Off. In season 3, Lawson was invited back and appeared in the Christmas special, singing lead on "Sweet Soul Music" with members of the cast.

In 2013, Lawson teamed up with Arizona hip-hop artist VaeeDaBoi for the single "Deep Love", released on July 15, 2013.

In 2015, Lawson's solo debut, Just a Mortal Man, was released on the Red Beet Records label. The album features full band recordings under Lawson's name for the first time. Produced by Lawson and Nashville artist and label owner Eric Brace, Just a Mortal Man was recorded in Phoenix, Nashville, and Washington, D.C., and includes songs by Brace, David Ruffin, Paul Simon, and others. "Woman in White" was co-written by Lawson and Grateful Dead lyricist Robert Hunter.

== Personal life and death ==
Lawson was born in Fort Lauderdale, Florida, and was raised in Apopka, Florida.

Lawson died in Phoenix, Arizona, on July 10, 2019, from Guillain–Barré syndrome, at age 75. He resided in Phoenix with his wife, Julie.

== Legacy ==
On February 24, 2022, Just a Mortal Man: The Jerry Lawson Story, a feature-length documentary produced by Miles Merritt and Gail Kempler, premiered nationwide on PBS.

== Discography ==
With the Persuasions

- 1969 – The Persuasions Acappella
- 1970 – We Came to Play
- 1971 – Street Corner Symphony
- 1972 – Spread the Word
- 1974 – I Just Want to Sing With My Friends
- 1977 – Chirpin'
- 1979 – Comin' at Ya
- 1982 – Good News
- 1984 – No Frills
- 1988 – Live in the Whispering Gallery
- 1993 – Toubo's Song
- 1993 – Ships at Sea, Sailors and Shoes (with Ned Sublette & Lawrence Weiner)
- 1994 – Right Around the Corner
- 1994 – Stardust (reissue)
- 1996 – Sincerely
- 1997 – Man, Oh Man: The Power of the Persuasions (1970–72 Capitol masters compilation)
- 1997 – You're All I Want for Christmas
- 1999 – On the Good Ship Lollipop
- 2000 – Sunday Morning Soul
- 2000 – Frankly A Cappella: The Persuasions Sing Frank Zappa
- 2000 – Might as Well... The Persuasions Sing Grateful Dead
- 2002 – The Persuasions Sing the Beatles
- 2003 – A Cappella Dreams
- 2009 – Live at McCabe's Guitar Shop
- 2011 – Persuasions of the Dead (expanded 2-CD reissue of Might as Well)

Solo

- 2003 – "Born to Run" from A Tribute to Bruce Springsteen (with Jimmy Hayes)
- 2007 – Jerry Lawson and Talk of the Town
- 2009 – "The Man in Room 1009" (with James Power)
- 2009 – "Thank You" from Gravity at Last (with Ayo)
- 2010 – "Hallelujah Time" from The Milroys (with John & CJ Milroy)
- 2015 – Just a Mortal Man
