= Boomerang (Barenaked Ladies song) =

2013 single by Barenaked Ladies

Single by Barenaked Ladies

from the album Grinning Streak
- Released: March 26, 2013
- Recorded: May 2012
- Genre: Alternative rock
- Length: 2:37 (Bob Clearmountain Mix); 2:46 (Mark Endert Mix)
- Label: Raisin'/Vanguard Records
- Songwriters: Ed Robertson, Zac Maloy
- Producer: Gavin Brown

Barenaked Ladies singles chronology
"Every Subway Car (Feat. Erin McCarley)" (2010)	"Boomerang" (2013)	"Odds Are" (2013)

"Boomerang" is a song by Canadian rock band Barenaked Ladies. It is the first single from their 2013 album, Grinning Streak. It was released as a downloadable single on March 26, 2013.

== History ==
"Boomerang" was written by Ed Robertson and the Nashville-based singer-songwriter, Zac Maloy. BNL headed into the studio on May 24, 2012 with multi-platinum, multi-Juno Award-winning producer Gavin Brown to begin recording "Boomerang". Pictures and videos from these sessions were posted by the band via Twitter. At the time, fans were unsure as to whether or not BNL were recording a full album, given conflicting reports from different members at different points in time. The band originally had no intent of recording a full album. After a show in Canandaigua on July 7, 2012, Robertson stated that they weren't working on a full album, because "Nobody wants to buy a full album anymore". Instead, they planned to release "Boomerang" as a non-album single in conjuncture with their "Last Summer On Earth 2012" tour. When asked about the release date, Ed added that the band members were not happy with the final mix of the song, and that they were waiting for a re-mix they could potentially release in the coming weeks. Despite remaining unreleased until March 2013, the band continued to play it at every show of their "Last Summer On Earth 2012" and "Symphony Barenaked" tours.

== Releases and mixes ==
The digital download of the single contains only the Bob Clearmountain mix. The promotional CD copy (issued mainly to radio stations for airplay), includes the Bob Clearmountain and Mark Endert mixes, respectively.

No.	Title	Writer(s)	Length
1.	"Boomerang" (Bob Clearmountain Mix)	Ed Robertson, Zac Maloy	2:37
2.	"Boomerang" (Mark Endert Mix)	Ed Robertson, Zac Maloy	2:46
Total length:			5:23

== Music videos ==
- The first video released for "Boomerang" was the official lyric video. It was released March 22, 2013 on BNL's official YouTube channel, "BNLMusic", and uses the Bob Clearmountain mix of the song. The video itself is a slideshow of fan-captured, fan-submitted pictures of historical landmarks in and around Toronto. As the music plays and the slideshow scrolls through all the pictures, the lyrics (in text format) are animated onto the pictures as they change, and are made to fit in with each scene, as well as be in sync with the song.
- A contest in search of the official music video for "Boomerang" was held by Barenaked Ladies, through Genero.TV. To enter, fans had to create and enter their own music videos for "Boomerang" into the contest, to be judged by Barenaked Ladies and the Genero.TV team once entries closed. The deadline for entries was April 29, 2013. The winner received a $5,000 cash prize, and their entry to the contest became the official music video for "Boomerang". Other outstanding video submissions that didn't win will still be nominated for the 2013 Genero Awards. Unlike the official lyric video for "Boomerang", this video uses the Mark Endert mix of the song.

== Charts ==
"Boomerang" debuted at No. 30 on Canada's adult contemporary chart, eventually climbing up no No. 11, and has spent eighteen weeks there (as of August 2013).

Chart (2013)	Peak position
Canada Adult Contemporary	11
