= Milk and Honey (album) =

Studio album by John Lennon and Yoko Ono
- Released: 27 January 1984
- Recorded: October–November 1979; August–December 1980; 1982–1983
- Genre: Rock
- Length: 36:49
- Label: Polydor
- Producers: John Lennon; Yoko Ono

John Lennon chronology
The John Lennon Collection (1982)	Milk and Honey (1984)	Live in New York City (1986)

Yoko Ono chronology
It's Alright (I See Rainbows) (1982)	Milk and Honey (1984)	Starpeace (1985)

Singles from Milk and Honey
- 1. "Nobody Told Me" Released: 6 January 1984; 2. "Borrowed Time" Released: 9 March 1984 (UK); 3. "I'm Stepping Out" Released: 15 March 1984 (US)

Milk and Honey is the sixth and final collaborative album by John Lennon and Yoko Ono, released in January 1984, three years after Lennon's murder. It is Lennon's eleventh and final album overall, and the first posthumous release of new Lennon music, having been recorded in the last months of his life during and following the sessions for his 1980 album Double Fantasy. It was assembled by Yoko Ono in association with the Geffen label.

== Background ==
Milk and Honey was the duo's projected follow-up to Double Fantasy, though Lennon's murder caused a temporary shelving of the project. It took Ono three years to be able to resume work to complete it. Ono's material largely comprises new recordings which she undertook during the album's preparation in 1983, which give her songs a more commercial and contemporary edge. Conversely, Lennon's material, being rough takes and rehearsal recordings, has a more casual feeling.

The album's title came from Ono, who explained that it referred to their journey to the US, "the land of milk and honey". "But also, in the Scripture, the land of milk and honey is where you go after you die, as a promised land", Ono went on to say. "So it's very strange that I thought of that title. Almost scary – like someone up there told me to call the next album Milk and Honey". The cover is an alternate take from the same photo session that produced the front cover of Double Fantasy, though this photo appears in colour.

== Music and lyrics ==
"Nobody Told Me", a song Lennon intended for Ringo Starr's 1981 album Stop and Smell the Roses, was released as a single and became a worldwide Top 10 hit. Other singles from the album were "I'm Stepping Out" and "Borrowed Time". The songs "Let Me Count the Ways" and "Grow Old with Me" were written by Lennon and Ono to each other using inspiration from poems by Elizabeth Barrett Browning and Robert Browning. They are presented in their demo form.

Ultimate Classic Rock critic Nick DeRiso called "I Don't Want to Face It" the most underrated song on Milk and Honey, describing it as being "complicated, just like Lennon, brutally frank and sort of tossed off, too".

== Release and aftermath ==
Professional ratings
Review scores
Source	Rating
AllMusic	3/5 stars
Robert Christgau	A
Mojo	3/5 stars
MusicHound	2.5/5 stars
Paste	3/5 stars
Rolling Stone	3/5 stars
The Rolling Stone Album Guide	3.5/5 stars
Sounds	3/5 stars
Uncut	2/5 stars

After falling out with David Geffen, whose Geffen Records had initially released Double Fantasy, Ono moved future projects to Polydor Records, which initially released Milk and Honey. EMI, home of Lennon's entire recorded output—including that with the Beatles—acquired this and all Lennon releases in the late 1990s.

Milk and Honey did not match the commercial success met by Double Fantasy in the wake of Lennon's death, but it was still well received, peaking at No. 3 in the UK and No. 11 in the US, where it went gold. Jack Douglas, who had co-produced Double Fantasy with Lennon and Ono, also had input into the initial sessions for Milk and Honey, though Ono declined to credit him after their professional relationship soured following Lennon's death. Shortly after the album's release, Douglas filed a lawsuit against Ono, which resulted in him being awarded an undetermined share of revenues from Milk and Honey.

In 2001, Ono supervised the remastering of Milk and Honey for its CD reissue, adding three bonus tracks and a 22-minute excerpt from Lennon's last interview in the late afternoon of 8 December 1980, 5 hours before his death. The CD was released in the United Kingdom on 8 October 2001.

The bonus tracks include home demo recordings of "I'm Stepping Out" and "I'm Moving On" (from Double Fantasy) along with a version of "Every Man Has a Woman Who Loves Him" featuring Lennon's vocals only, which was planned to be included on the Ono tribute album that was released in 1984, titled Every Man Has a Woman.

== Track listing ==
Side one
No.	Title	Writer(s)	Length
1.	"I'm Stepping Out"	John Lennon	4:06
2.	"Sleepless Night"	Yoko Ono	2:34
3.	"I Don't Wanna Face It"	Lennon	3:22
4.	"Don't Be Scared"	Ono	2:45
5.	"Nobody Told Me"	Lennon	3:34
6.	"O' Sanity"	Ono	1:05

Side two
No.	Title	Writer(s)	Length
7.	"Borrowed Time"	Lennon	4:29
8.	"Your Hands"	Ono	3:04
9.	"(Forgive Me) My Little Flower Princess"	Lennon	2:28
10.	"Let Me Count the Ways"	Ono	2:17
11.	"Grow Old with Me"	Lennon	3:07
12.	"You're the One"	Ono	3:56
Total length:			36:49

2001 reissue bonus tracks
No.	Title	Writer(s)	Length
13.	"Every Man Has a Woman Who Loves Him"	Ono	3:18
14.	"I'm Stepping Out" (home version)	Lennon	2:57
15.	"I'm Moving On" (home version)	Ono	1:20
16.	"John and Yoko interview" (by Dave Sholin & Laurie Kaye, 8 December 1980)		21:55
Total length:			66:20

== Personnel ==
- John Lennon – guitar, keyboards, vocals, piano on "Grow Old with Me"
- Yoko Ono – vocals, piano on "Let Me Count the Ways"
- Chris Mawson – guitar
- Earl Slick – guitar
- Elliott Randall – guitar
- Steve Love – guitar
- Hugh McCracken – guitar
- Neil Jason – bass guitar
- Tony Levin – bass guitar
- Wayne Pedziwiatr – bass guitar
- Howard Johnson – baritone saxophone
- Gordon Grody – backing vocals
- Billy Alessi – backing vocals
- Bobby Alessi – backing vocals
- Peter Cannarozzi – synthesizer
- Paul Griffin – piano
- George Small – piano
- Ed Walsh – keyboards
- Peter Thom – backing vocals
- Kurt Yaghjian – backing vocals
- Carlos Alomar – backing vocals
- Andy Newmark – drums
- Allan Schwartzberg – drums
- Yogi Horton – drums
- Arthur Jenkins – percussion
- Jimmy Maelen – percussion

== Charts ==
=== Weekly charts ===
Chart (1984)	Position
Australian Kent Music Report Chart	4
Austrian Albums Chart	12
Canadian RPM Albums Chart	15
Dutch Mega Albums Chart	4
French SNEP Albums Chart	10
Finnish Albums Chart	25
Italian Albums (Musica e dischi)	16
Japanese Oricon LP Chart	3
New Zealand Albums Chart	34
Norwegian VG-lista Albums Chart	7
Swedish Albums Chart	3
Swiss Albums Chart	15
UK Albums Chart	3
US Billboard 200	11
West German Media Control Albums Chart	20

=== Year-end charts ===
Chart (1984)	Position
Australian Albums Chart	67
Canadian Albums Chart	82
Japanese Albums Chart	83

== Certifications and sales ==
Region	Certification	Certified units/sales
Canada (Music Canada)	Gold	50,000^{^}
Japan (Oricon Charts)	—	106,000
United Kingdom (BPI)	Gold	100,000^{^}
United States (RIAA)	Gold	500,000^{^}
^{^} Shipments figures based on certification alone.
