= Borrowed Time (John Lennon song) =

1984 song by John Lennon

- US picture sleeve

Single by John Lennon

from the album Milk and Honey
- B-side: "Your Hands" (Yoko Ono)
- Released: 9 March 1984 (UK); 11 May 1984 (US)
- Recorded: 6 August 1980
- Genre: Calypso; reggae
- Length: 4:30
- Label: Polydor
- Songwriter: John Lennon
- Producers: John Lennon; Yoko Ono

John Lennon singles chronology
"Nobody Told Me" (1984)	"Borrowed Time" (1984)	"I'm Stepping Out" (1984)

"Borrowed Time" is a song from John Lennon and Yoko Ono's last album, Milk and Honey. While the single failed to chart in the US, it reached number 32 in the UK Singles Chart. The B-side features Ono's song "Your Hands" from the same album.

== Composition ==
The song was inspired during Lennon's 1980 sailing holiday from Newport, Rhode Island, to Bermuda. During the journey, Lennon's yacht encountered a prolonged and severe storm, resulting in most of the crew eventually succumbing to profound fatigue and seasickness. Lennon (free of seasickness, which Lennon claimed was a result of his recovery from heroin addiction some years earlier) was eventually forced to take the yacht's wheel alone for many hours. Lennon found this terrifying but invigorating, with the effect of both renewing his confidence and making him contemplate the fragility of life. Once he arrived in Bermuda, Lennon heard the line 'living on borrowed time' from Bunny Wailer's "Hallelujah Time" and was inspired by his recent experience to write the lyrics around that theme. Wailer was also the inspiration for the reggae feel of the music. Lennon commented that living on borrowed time was exactly what he was doing but then said, "come to think of it, it's what we're all doing, even though most of us don't like to face it."^{:159}

== Recording ==
A demo of the song with acoustic guitar and double-tracked vocals was recorded in Bermuda on 22 June 1980 and was released on the John Lennon Anthology in 1998.

An attempt was made to formally record the song during the Double Fantasy sessions on 6 August 1980. It was the second song attempted during the sessions, with Lennon telling the band to think of the Isley Brothers' "Twist and Shout" and "Spanish Twist". As he was somewhat frustrated that the band could not quite catch the reggae feel, Lennon decided to set the song aside. A horn overdub was planned, but never recorded. The song was later released incomplete and posthumously on Milk and Honey.

== Reception ==
Cash Box said that "the sparse musical backing and the cut's reggae/calypso setting make 'Borrowed Time' a true delight."

== Personnel ==
- John Lennon – vocals, rhythm guitar
- Earl Slick, Hugh McCracken – guitar
- Tony Levin – bass guitar
- George Small – keyboards
- Andy Newmark – drums
- Arthur Jenkins – percussion

== Covers ==
The song was covered by O.A.R. for Instant Karma: The Amnesty International Campaign to Save Darfur, Amnesty International's campaign to alleviate the crisis in Darfur.
