= Nothing to Fear =

Nothing to Fear may refer to:

- Nothing to Fear (Oingo Boingo album), 1982
- Nothing to Fear (MC Lars album), 1999
- "Nothing to Fear" (song), a 1992 song by Chris Rea
- "Nothing to Fear", a song by Depeche Mode from A Broken Frame
- "Nothing to Fear" (Batman: The Animated Series), a 1992 television episode
- "Nothing to Fear", a 1999 episode of the American children’s television series Bear in the Big Blue House
- "Nothing to Fear" (Doctors), a 2001 television episode
- "Nothing to Fear" (Once Upon a Time in Wonderland), a 2014 television episode

== See also ==
- Nothing to fear but fear itself (disambiguation)
