= The Guitar Album =

Compilation album by Richard Hernández
- Released: 1974 (US)
- Genre: Rock
- Length: 74:46
- Label: Polydor (Polydor PD2-3008)

The Guitar Album is a 1974 double compilation album featuring live performances of popular guitarists. It features eighteen tracks from artists Eric Clapton, Roy Buchanan, Rory Gallagher, T-Bone Walker, Ellen McIlwaine, Link Wray, Stone the Crows, John McLaughlin and Area Code 615. The album was issued by Polydor in a gatefold pressing. Though it was originally released in the United States it was later reissued in the United Kingdom.

== Track listing ==
=== Side one ===
1. "Slunky" by Eric Clapton (B. Bramlett/E. Clapton) – 3:34
2. "Sweet Dreams" by Roy Buchanan (D. Gibson) – 3:33
3. "Walk on Hot Coals" by Rory Gallagher (R. Gallagher) – 7:01
4. "Everyday I Have the Blues" by T-Bone Walker (P. Chatman) – 2:47
5. "Sliding" by Ellen McIlwaine (E. McIlwaine) – 2:52

=== Side two ===
1. "Lawdy Miss Clawdy" by Link Wray (L. Price) – 2:40
2. "Tribute to Elmore James" by Roy Buchanan (R. Buchanan) – 3:25
3. "Have You Ever Loved a Woman" by Eric Clapton (B. Myles) – 6:54
4. "Tattoo'd Lady" by Rory Gallagher (R. Gallagher) – 4:40

=== Side three ===
1. "We the People" by Ellen McIlwaine (E. McIlwaine) – 3:21
2. "I May Be Right I May Be Wrong" by Stone the Crows (Stone the Crows) – 5:02
3. "After Hours" by Roy Buchanan (A. Parrish) – 6:13
4. "Let it Rain" by Eric Clapton (B. Bramlett/E. Clapton) – 5:03

=== Side four ===
1. "Extrapolation" by John McLaughlin (J. McLaughlin) – 3:54
2. "The Messiah Will Come Again" by Roy Buchanan (R. Buchanan) – 5:53
3. "Sligo" by Area Code 615 (Buttrey/Moss) – 2:23
4. "Losing You" by Ellen McIlwaine (E. McIlwaine) – 2:20
5. "Filthy Teddy" by Roy Buchanan (R. Buchanan) – 3:11
