= Up from the Skies: The Polydor Years =

Up From the Skies: The Polydor Years

Compilation album by Ellen McIlwaine
- Released: July 7, 1998
- Recorded: Tracks 1–6; Live at The Bitter End, New York City Tracks 7–9, 11–20; Record Plant Studios, New York Track 10; Burmese Records Studio, New York Track 21; Live at Carnegie Hall, New York
- Length: 73:37
- Label: Polygram
- Producer: Peter K. Seigel (original recordings); Jerry Rappaport (compilation)

Professional ratings
Review scores
Source	Rating
Allmusic	4.5/5 stars

Up From the Skies: The Polydor Years is a 1998 compilation album featuring the music of Ellen McIlwaine during her 1972–1973 recording years with Polydor Records. The first half of the album is made up of her debut solo album Honky Tonk Angel while the second half consists of her second album We the People.

== Track listing ==
All tracks are written by Ellen McIlwaine except where noted.

1. "Toe Hold" (Isaac Hayes/David Porter) – 4:32
2. "Weird of Hermiston" (Jack Bruce/Pete Brown) – 5:06
3. "Up From the Skies" (Jimi Hendrix) – 3:52
4. "Losing You" – 2:22
5. "It's Growing" (Smokey Robinson/Warren Moore) – 3:05
6. Ode to Billy Joe (Bobbie Gentry) – 4:13
7. "Pinebo (My Story)" (Guy Warren) – 2:41
8. "Can't Find My Way Home" (Steve Winwood) – 3:39
9. "Wings of a Horse" – 4:01
10. "It Wasn't God Who Made Honky Tonk Angels" (J.D. Miller) – 2:38
11. "Wade in the Water" – 4:55
12. "Ain't No Two Ways About It (It's Love)" – 4:26
13. "All to You" – 3:05
14. "Sliding" – 2:52
15. "Never Tell Your Mother She's Out of Tune" (Jack Bruce/Pete Brown) – 2:25
16. "Farther Along" (Traditional) – 3:44
17. "I Don't Want to Play" – 3:20
18. "Underground River" – 3:54
19. "Everybody Wants To Go To Heaven (But Nobody Wants To Die)" (Al Fields/Tom Delaney/Timmie Rogers) – 2:25
20. "Jimmy Jean" – 2:59
21. "We the People" – 3:23
- Tracks 1–11 were originally released as Honky Tonk Angel, March 1972, except for track 5, which is previously unreleased.
- Tracks 12–21 were originally released as We the People, January 1973.
