= Blue's Big Musical Movie =

2000 live-action/animated film by Todd Kessler

- VHS cover art
- Directed by: Todd Kessler
- Written by: Angela C. Santomero; Michael T. Smith
- Based on: Blue's Clues by Traci Paige Johnson; Todd Kessler; Angela C. Santomero
- Produced by: Wendy Harris
- Starring: Steven Burns; Traci Paige Johnson; Ray Charles
- Cinematography: Skip Roessel
- Edited by: David Bouffard; L. Mark Sorre
- Music by: Nick Balaban; Michael Rubin
- Production company: Nickelodeon Animation Studio
- Distributed by: Paramount Home Entertainment
- Release date: October 3, 2000
- Running time: 78 minutes
- Country: United States
- Language: English

Blue's Big Musical Movie, also known as Blue's Big Musical, is a 2000 American live-action animated direct-to-video musical film directed by Todd Kessler, and written by Angela C. Santomero and Michael T. Smith. It is the first film in the Blue's Clues film series and is based on the Nick Jr. television series.

Blue's Big Musical Movie was released on VHS and DVD on October 3, 2000. A video game based on the film was released for the PlayStation. Blue's Big City Adventure, a film based on Blue's Clues' sequel series Blue's Clues & You, was released in 2022.

== Plot ==
Blue, Steve, and everyone else at the Blue's Clues house are putting on a show in the backyard, called the "You Can Be Anything You Wanna Be" show, where everyone gets to sing about what they want to be when they grow up. While the gang has their breakfast and talks about the show, Periwinkle eavesdrops on them, but mishears them, believing it's a "magic show", and leaves to practice his tricks for it. Blue and Tickety-Tock are doing a duet about being teachers, but while showing off their performance to everyone, Tickety's voice gets raspy, and she loses her voice. So, she decides to ring her bells during the performance instead, leaving Blue without a singing partner.

So, Blue decides she wants to play a game of Blue's Clues to find another person to be her singing partner. Throughout the special, everyone works hard to prepare for the music show, while Steve, Sidetable Drawer, and Periwinkle struggle to achieve certain goals: Steve wishes to be able to find a clue without the help of the viewers, Periwinkle fails to get Steve's attention to watch his magic tricks, and Sidetable Drawer wants to be in the show too, but is somehow too shy to ask Steve about it.

Soon enough, the show is almost ready, and Steve has found two of the three clues: his own notebook and a knob. With the help of a musical note named G-Clef (voiced by Ray Charles), Steve manages to write a song he wants to sing in the show, since he loves singing songs. The only thing left to do before the show, is to find the last clue. After some encouragement from the others, Steve manages to find the last clue without any assistance, for the first time. The last clue is a drawer and learns that Sidetable Drawer should be Blue's singing partner but is unable to find her because he assigned her to do other tasks, after Sidetable asked him if she could help out with the show, because of her shyness getting the best of her. Steve has Periwinkle find Sidetable and Periwinkle finds her. After lamenting about their failed goals, Periwinkle comes up with an idea to accomplish both. Periwinkle performs a magic trick that makes Sidetable Drawer reappear in front of everyone, and she finally gets her wish to participate in the music show.

Periwinkle soon learns that it was a music show and not a magic show, and is disappointed, but still puts his talents to use by being the opening act while everyone else makes final preparations because the audience is starting to get impatient from waiting. In the show, everyone performs their acts, including Steve singing the song he made up with the music notes earlier, with the viewers as his singing partner. The music show is a success, and Steve thanks the viewers for all their help. Everyone sings a Broadway-styled version of the "So Long Song" and everyone takes their final bows to conclude the show.

== Cast ==
- Steven Burns as Steve

=== Voice cast ===
- Traci Paige Johnson as Blue
- Nick Balaban as Mr. Salt and Snail
- Spencer Kayden as Mrs. Pepper
- Jenna Marie Castle as Paprika
  - Aleisha Allen as Paprika's singing voice
- Kelly Nigh as Tickety Tock
- Cody Ross Pitts as Slippery Soap
  - Evan Dorfman as Slippery Soap's singing voice
- Michael Rubin as Mailbox
- Olivia Zaro as Pail
- Jonathan Press as Shovel
- Cameron Bowen as Periwinkle
- Aleisha Allen as Sidetable Drawer
- Adam Peltzman as Green Puppy
- Koyalee Chanda as Magenta
- Alexander Claffy as Purple Kangaroo

=== Guest stars ===
- Ray Charles as G-Clef
- Jimmy Hayes, Jerry Lawson, Joe Russell, and Jayotis Washington (The Persuasions) as the Notes

== Reception ==
Hartford Courant wrote that while the film teaches children "sharing and working together", it also teaches "self-expression and friendship" through "the smooth tones of Ray Charles" as the voice of G-Clef, and remarked that it was "an excellent segment".

Digitally Obsessed wrote the film was a "mixture of Pee-wee's Playhouse and Peanuts with a touch of Where's Waldo thrown in that is probably a lot of fun for kids and teaches while requiring the kids to think".

Chicago Sun-Times noted that as being centered in the world of the "most watched pre-school television show", the video will prove popular with parents of young children.

Time stated that direct to video where children's films are concerned and noted that Blue's Big Musical Movie spun the popular children's television series into a "full-length extravaganza".

In Doug Pratt's DVD: Movies, Television, Music, Art, Adult, and More!, author Pratt observes that even though designed for toddlers, Steven Burns, as the only human in the cast, delivered a "remarkable and consistent performance" while speaking directly to the camera in addressing his young viewers, speaking slowly and clearly without being condescending or patronizing.

Review Corner wrote that the film was "complete with all the charm and learning that makes the television series outstanding, and then some". They offered that while the "feature-film debut follows basically the same tried-and-true format of the television series, it contains longer (mostly musical) interludes and plenty of mini-stories and adventures along the way", as well as introducing a new character, Periwinkle the cat.

=== Awards and nominations ===
The film earned a Young Artist Award nomination for Best Family Feature Film, but lost to the 2001 DreamWorks animated film Shrek.

- 2001, Nominated for Young Artist Award for Best Family Feature Film – Animation
