= Say What You Want (Barenaked Ladies song) =

Single by Barenaked Ladies

from the album Silverball
- Released: April 28, 2015
- Recorded: December 2014–January 2015
- Genre: Alternative rock
- Length: 3:35
- Label: Vanguard Records
- Songwriter: Ed Robertson
- Producer: Gavin Brown

Barenaked Ladies singles chronology
"Did I Say That Out Loud?" (2014)	"Say What You Want" (2015)

"Say What You Want" is a song by Canadian rock band Barenaked Ladies. It is the lead single from their 2015 album, Silverball. It was made available for streaming by Entertainment Weekly on April 27, 2015, then for digital download the following day.

== History ==
Barenaked Ladies frontman, Ed Robertson was quoted as saying "Say What You Want is a celebration of letting go. It’s about feeling confident, and realizing that you can’t control what other people do or say, you can only control how you react to it. It’s a very triumphant song for me."

== Music video ==
The music video shows the band performing in a one-off custom pinball machine themed on the Barenaked Ladies. This machine was built by a technician at a Texas pinball arcade. The video was produced by Rooster Teeth.

== Release ==
No.	Title	Writer(s)	Length
1.	"Say What You Want"	Ed Robertson	3:35
