= Nothing to fear but fear itself =

Nothing to fear but fear itself may refer to:

- A phrase from the 1933 inaugural address of Franklin D. Roosevelt
- "Nothing to Fear but Fear Itself", an episode of the television series The Golden Girls
- "Nothing to Fear (But Fear Itself)", a song by Oingo Boingo on the 1982 album Nothing to Fear
- "Nothing to fear but Fear Itself", an episode of the American-Canadian television series Painkiller Jane
- "Nothing to fear but Fear Itself", an episode of the Canadian television series Class of the Titans
- "Nothing to fear but fear itself", a phrase in Batman Begins
- "Nothing to fear but fear itself", a phrase in To Kill a Mockingbird

== See also ==
- "Cowgirls have gone Wild the movie: Nothing to fear but fear itself", an episode of Wild Things
- Fear Itself (disambiguation)
- Nothing to Fear (disambiguation)
- "Fear is the true enemy, the only enemy.", a phrase spoken in Star Trek: The Next Generation season 1 episode 5 "The Last Outpost", misattributed to Sun Tzu
