= Fake Nudes: Naked =

EP by Barenaked Ladies
- Released: 30 May 2019
- Genres: Acoustic rock, alternative rock
- Length: 26:01
- Label: Vanguard Records
- Producer: Gavin Brown

Barenaked Ladies chronology
Fake Nudes (2017)	Fake Nudes: Naked (2019)	Detour de Force (2021)

Fake Nudes: Naked is an EP by Canadian rock band Barenaked Ladies. It is the band's fifth EP and their 17th release overall. The EP was released as a digital download only on 30 May 2019 by Vanguard Records.

The EP features acoustic versions of 8 of the 14 tracks original released on Fake Nudes. All tracks were recorded live in the studio without overdubs.

== Track listing ==
No.	Title	Writer(s)	Lead vocal	Length
1.	"Canada Dry" (acoustic)	Kevin Griffin; Ed Robertson	Robertson	3:10
2.	"Bringing It Home" (acoustic)	Griffin; Robertson	Robertson	3:09
3.	"Invisible Fence" (acoustic)	Kevin Hearn	Hearn	2:53
4.	"Lookin' Up" (acoustic)	Griffin; Sam Hollander; Robertson	Robertson	2:58
5.	"Sunshine" (acoustic)	Hearn; Robertson	Robertson	3:41
6.	"We Took the Night" (acoustic)	Jim Creeggan	Creeggan	2:14
7.	"Navigate" (acoustic)	Hearn; Robertson	Robertson	3:58
8.	"The Township of King" (acoustic)	Hearn	Hearn	3:58
Total length:				26:01

== Personnel ==
- Jim Creeggan – bass, lead and background vocals
- Kevin Hearn – piano, acoustic guitars, lead and background vocals
- Ed Robertson – lead and backing vocals, acoustic guitars
- Tyler Stewart – drums, percussion, background vocals
