= Alfonso Maiorana =

Canadian filmmaker and cinematographer

Alfonso Maiorana is a Canadian filmmaker and cinematographer. He is most noted for his work on the feature film Rumble: The Indians Who Rocked the World, for which he won the Canadian Screen Award for Best Cinematography in a Documentary at the 6th Canadian Screen Awards in 2018.

In 2024 his film Goddess of Slide, a documentary about slide guitarist Ellen McIlwaine, premiered at the Calgary International Film Festival. The film was nominated for the DGC Allan King Award for Best Documentary Film at the 2025 Directors Guild of Canada awards.
