= Detour de Force =

Studio album by Barenaked Ladies
- Released: 16 July 2021
- Recorded: February–March 2020; June–August 2020
- Studios: The Herbert/Robertson Hideaway; Noble Street Studios; Vespa Studios
- Genre: Pop rock
- Label: Raisin' Records
- Producers: Eric Ratz; Mark Howard

Barenaked Ladies chronology
Fake Nudes: Naked (2019)	Detour de Force (2021)	In Flight (2023)

Singles from Detour de Force
- 1. "Flip" Released: 12 April 2021; 2. "New Disaster" Released: 4 June 2021; 3. "Good Life" Released: 16 July 2021

Professional ratings
Aggregate scores
Source	Rating
Metacritic	61/100
Review scores
Source	Rating
AllMusic	3.5/5 stars
Exclaim!	6/10
PopMatters	5/10
Under the Radar	5/10 stars

Detour de Force is the thirteenth studio album by Canadian rock band Barenaked Ladies, released on 16 July 2021 by Raisin' Records. It was released in CD, digital and double transparent-blue vinyl formats.

The album was recorded in two spans; first at Ed Robertson's cottage in February–March 2020, followed by sessions at Noble Street Studios and Vespa Studios in Toronto, Ontario in June–August 2020. Production was interrupted by the COVID-19 pandemic which delayed the band's touring and album release schedule as well.

The vinyl LP edition of the album includes a previously unreleased track, "The Way of The Heart", written and sung by Kevin Hearn.

== Production ==
The original cottage sessions were produced by Mark Howard. The band had intended a more stripped-down session which would have been followed by limited studio time to add finishing touches, but the cottage sessions were interrupted in mid-March 2020 by the COVID-19 pandemic. As a result, the band had more time to complete the record, and spent June–August 2020 with producer Eric Ratz reshaping the record.

== Singles ==
The lead single, "Flip", was made available for download on 12 April 2021. This was followed by "New Disaster" which premiered on 4 June 2021. The third single, "Good Life," was released simultaneously with the album on 16 July 2021. Each song was accompanied by a music video.

== Track listing ==
No.	Title	Writer(s)	Lead vocal(s)	Length
1.	"Flip"	Ed Robertson; Kevin Griffin	Ed Robertson	3:07
2.	"Good Life"	Ed Robertson; Kevin Griffin	Ed Robertson	3:21
3.	"New Disaster"	Ed Robertson; Kevin Griffin	Ed Robertson	3:58
4.	"Big Back Yard"	Kevin Hearn	Kevin Hearn	3:58
5.	"Live Well"	Ed Robertson	Ed Robertson	4:13
6.	"Flat Earth"	Ed Robertson; Danny Michel	Ed Robertson	3:36
7.	"Here Together"	Jim Creeggan; James Bryan McCollum	Jim Creeggan	4:06
8.	"Roll Out"	Ed Robertson; Kevin Griffin; Craig Wiseman	Ed Robertson	3:06
9.	"Bylaw"	Kevin Hearn	Kevin Hearn	3:44
10.	"God Forbid"	Ed Robertson; Donovan Woods	Ed Robertson	3:58
11.	"Paul Chambers"	Jim Creeggan; Mike Evin	Jim Creeggan	3:33
12.	"The National Park"	Kevin Hearn	Kevin Hearn	4:28
13.	"Man Made Lake"	Ed Robertson; Donovan Woods	Ed Robertson	5:18
14.	"Internal Dynamo"	Kevin Hearn	Kevin Hearn; Tyler Stewart	5:14
Total length:				55:40

== Personnel ==
Barenaked Ladies

- Jim Creeggan – electric and double bass, cello, electric guitar, Taurus pedals, vocals, string & horn arrangements on "Paul Chambers"
- Kevin Hearn – pianos, keyboards, Continuum, accordion, acoustic and electric guitars, drum loops, vocals
- Ed Robertson – vocals, acoustic and electric guitars, percussion, drums on "Internal Dynamo"
- Tyler Stewart – drums, percussion, vocals
