= Cassius Khan =

Canadian Indian classical musician

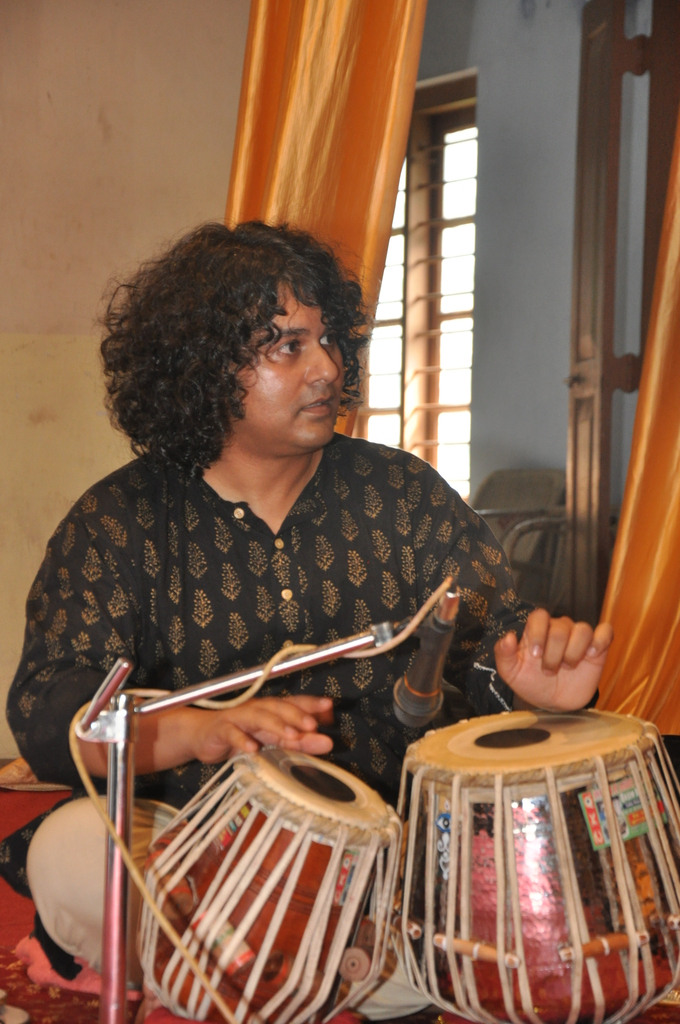
Cassius Khan, performing at Kollam, Kerala, India

Cassius Khan (born 7 June 1974) is a Canadian Indian classical musician known for playing the Tabla while singing ghazal as well as his ground breaking collaborations in music.

== Early life ==
Khan was born in Lautoka, Fiji. As a young teenager in Vancouver, Canada, Khan met Mushtari Begum, a Ghazal singer, Sheikh Mohyudean, a harmonium and Qawaali singer, and Ustad Rukhsar Ali, a Tabla player.

== Career ==
After performing as a sideman in various bands, in 2001, Khan composed the "Asia Music" for the IAAF World Championships in Athletics under the guidance of composer Jan Randall. The same year, he was included in BBC Radio 2's list of the "Top 25 World Artists to look out for".

In 2005, Khan performed Ghazal and a Tabla solo recital at the National Arts Centre in Ottawa as part of Alberta Scene Festival, and presented his first classical Ghazal and Tabla recital at a Canadian folk festival at the Salmon Arm Roots and Blues Festival in 2006. He was selected out of 8,000 applicants to showcase Ghazal/Tabla at South by Southwest in Austin, Texas in 2008. That same year Ellen McIlwaine and Khan were invited to perform for Juno Fest at the Juno Awards in Calgary. The following year Khan was a featured artist for the Canadian Music Week. Khan's recordings were also selected for the Japan Trade Mission in 2009. Khan was also the first Canadian to perform at the Sa Ma Pa Music Festival in New Delhi, on 23 November 2013.

Khan was signed by the Yarlowe Artist Group in 2008 and ended his contract in 2009.

Khan's Ghazal album Mushtari, a live concert, released in 2011, was nominated for "World Album of the Year" by the Western Canadian Music Awards (WCMA) and was a tribute to Khan's guru and teacher, Mushtari Begum, with a selection of classical Ghazals and a tabla solo recital. This was the first album ever recorded with Ghazal and tabla simultaneously by one artist. He also released a tabla solo single, "Sparks of Energy", in 2011. Both of these albums feature Khan's wife Amika Kushwaha as the Harmonium soloist.

Khan's other collaborations include: Dark Clouds (2006) with Jazz pianist Stu Goldberg of Mahavishnu Orchestra; a collaboration with slide guitarist Ellen McIlwaine entitled Mystic Bridge, a Blues/Indian music album which was shortlisted for the Juno Award for Roots & Traditional Album of the Year in 2008; I Feel Love Again (2002) with Mediterranean guitarist Pavlo; Mani Licks (2002) with Heavy Metal/shred guitarist Dan Mani; A Demon's Dream (2002) and The Alchemists (2002) with acoustic/electric guitarist Dave Martone; and Angel of Sevilla (1990) with the Spanish guitarist D'Arcy Greaves.

Khan has also collaborated with the inventor of the Mohan Veena, artist Pandit Vishwa Mohan Bhatt, Satvik Veena performer Pandit Salil Bhatt, Kathak artist/Harmonium soloist Amika Kushwaha and many other figures of Indian classical music and Ghazal singers.

== Recognition ==
Cassius Khan was awarded the "Salute to Excellence Award" in 2005 by the City of Edmonton for his contribution to Indian classical music, and the "Bernie Legge Artist of the Year" by the City of New Westminster Chamber of Commerce in 2019. He was nominated (with Ellen McIlwaine) for a Juno Award for their album Mystic Bridge in 2008, and a WCMA Award nomination for his album Mushtari-a live concert. He has also performed in Geneva, Switzerland, for the United Nations, World Intellectual Property Organization and the Permanent Mission of India for Namaste Geneva, an initiative created by the Indian Ambassador to the UN, His Excellency Rajiv Chander, in 2017/2018.

Cassius Khan was featured at the 2025 Saptak Festival in Ahmedabad India known to be the most prestigious Indian classical festival in the world. Khan is the first ever Canadian to have received such an honour.

With his wife, Amika Kushwaha, Khan founded the Mushtari Begum Festival of Indian Classical Music and Dance which is Canada’s Premiere Indian Classical music and dance festival which took place for the first time on April 3rd 2004 and then 25 August 2012 at the Official Venue Partner of the MBF the Massey Theatre in New Westminster, British Columbia. He is an honorary Cultural Ambassador to the City of New Westminster.

Khan is also the official spokesperson for the tabla makers Ustad Qasim Khan Niyazi and Sons in Laxminagar, New Delhi, India, and is endorsed by Aman Kalyan's Lehra Studio apps based in Sydney, Australia. He is also the Curator of the Global Tea Series with Cassius Khan at the Massey Theatre in New Westminster, and was a 2021 Artist Resident at the Anvil Centre in the same city and 2024 Artist Resident at the Massey Theatre. Khan is also a visiting music instructor at the international private Mulgrave School, where he teaches young students Indian Classical music..

Cassius Khan is known as “Canada’s Multifaceted Musician” (Edmonton Journal 2002) for his collaborations and is ranked #1 as Canada’s top Indian classical musician.
