= Rip Rense =

American journalist

Rip Rense is an American music and film journalist, author, poet, and music producer, based in Los Angeles, California. He has written for numerous Los Angeles publications since the 1970s, including LA Weekly, the Valley News, the Los Angeles Herald-Examiner, and the Los Angeles Times. His writing has also appeared in The New York Times, Chicago Sun-Times, The Washington Post, and the magazines Billboard, TV Guide, People and Los Angeles, among others.

Rense's activities in the music industry have included writing the liner notes for albums by Frank Zappa, the Grateful Dead, Captain Beefheart and the Persuasions. He produced a series of comeback albums by the Persuasions, beginning with the group's 2000-released Frankly A Cappella, a collection of a cappella interpretations of Zappa's music. Among Rense's works as an author, The Oaks (2007) is his semi-autobiographical account of growing up in 1960s Thousand Oaks, and The Last Byline (2003) details life at a fictional newspaper from the same era.

== Early life and early career ==
Rip Rense's parents were Arthur F. Rense and the latter's first wife, Madelon. His father was a sports journalist with the Los Angeles newspaper the Daily News before going on to a successful career in public relations, notably with the Douglas Aircraft Company and the Summa Corporation.

The family home during the 1950s and 1960s was in the then-rural suburb of Thousand Oaks, north-west of Los Angeles. Rense was the youngest of three sons. Rense attended Venice High School, where one of his classmates was Scott Wannberg, later a leading figure in the Los Angeles poetry and literary establishment. Rense attended California State University, Northridge in the 1970s and wrote for the student newspaper, The Daily Sundial.

At the start of his career in journalism, Rense worked as a reporter for the Valley News and the Los Angeles Herald-Examiner. He recalls that one of his early assignments, for LA Weekly, was to attend a chaotic press conference held by former Beatle George Harrison in February 1979.

== Writings on film and music ==
During the early 1980s, Rense wrote several articles for the Herald-Examiner on Hollywood film legends Laurel and Hardy, particularly about a series of rediscovered short films featuring the comedy duo. In his 1990 biography of Laurel and Hardy, Wes D. Gehring pairs Rense's insights with those of New York Times reporter Mervyn Rothstein; the two journalists' findings, Gehring writes, combine to form "a Laurel and Hardy composite, complementing each other both in relationship to these specific rereleased short subjects and to their comic charisma in general". Rense's 1994 Los Angeles Times features on the first film dramatization of Superman – 1951's Superman and the Mole Men – included an interview with Phyllis Coates, who discussed the gender politics behind her portrayal of the character Lois Lane. While at the Valley News in the late 1970s, Rense interviewed one of Hollywood's pioneer studio owners, Allan Dwan.

Among his contributions to Billboard magazine, he wrote an article in September 1986 on the rise of corporate sponsors such as Westwood One and their effect on the music industry. Rense interviewed George Harrison for Guitar World magazine in 1987. In his book While My Guitar Gently Weeps, author Simon Leng quotes Rense's observations on the importance of Harrison's guitar contributions to the Beatles' sound.

Rense became a friend with LA-based singer-songwriter Tom Waits, and later supplied the press-kit essay accompanying Waits' acclaimed 1999 album Mule Variations. Waits told him that the album title had originated from Waits' wife, Kathleen Brennan, telling the singer: "I didn't marry a man – I married a mule."

Rense supplied the liner notes to Captain Beefheart's 2014 box set Sun Zoom Spark: 1970 to 1972. His poetry also appears on Red Beans and Weiss, a 2014 album by singer Chuck E. Weiss.

== Music producer ==
A champion of Frank Zappa's work, Rense produced a Zappa tribute album, Frankly A Cappella, in 2000, recorded by the veteran doo-wop vocal group the Persuasions. Having written in 1998 of the Persuasions as pioneer a cappella vocalists, and of their influence on a new generation of popular acts that included Boyz II Men, Color Me Badd, Rockapella and Take 6, Rense subsequently worked with the group on projects such as Might as Well … The Persuasions Sing Grateful Dead. Discussing his role as their executive producer, Rense told NPR in October 2000 that he was keen to "do something nice in Frank's memory and at the same time do something nice for the Persuasions and give them the kind of forum to get the recognition that they deserved". AllMusic critic Steve Cooper wrote of these unlikely a cappella interpretations of works by Zappa and the Grateful Dead: "Thirty-five years into their career and the Persuasions are on a major roll."

In 2011, Rense arranged for the Persuasions to re-record much of the material from Might as Well, in addition to covering more songs by the Grateful Dead. The result, a two-CD set, was issued as Persuasions of the Dead: The Grateful Dead Sessions, for which Rense is also credited as a producer.

== Los Angeles cultural history ==
Aside from his entertainment-related articles, Rense has written about Los Angeles cultural landmarks such as the ancient Lang Oak, which he described in a 1996 LA Times article as "Encino's oldest resident". He maintains an online archive for the long-defunct Daily News. While interviewing Helen Brush Jenkins, a former photojournalist with the News, Rense bemoaned that "When reminiscing about old L.A. newspapers, everyone seems to mention the Examiner and the Herald-Express, or the Times, but seldom the Daily News", to which Brush Jenkins replied: "Well, the Examiner was a lying paper, and the Herald-Express was worse than the Examiner … The Daily News was an independent, and no-you-can't-bribe-me paper."

In 2007 he published The Oaks, a semi-autobiographical account of growing up in Thousand Oaks during the 1960s. His first novel, The Last Byline (2003), was set in the newsroom of a fictional newspaper, the Los Angeles Chronicle. Reviewing the book for CounterPunch, investigative reporter David Lindorff wrote that Rense "has a knack for spotting the bizarre little quirks that made daily journalism what it was during its heyday". Rense's book Strange Places of the Heart was published in 2014.
