= I'm Stepping Out =

1984 single by John Lennon

- US picture sleeve

Single by John Lennon

from the album Milk and Honey
- B-side: "Sleepless Night" (Yoko Ono)
- Released: 15 March 1984 (US); 13 July 1984 (UK)
- Recorded: 6 August 1980
- Genre: Rock
- Length: 4:05
- Label: Polydor
- Songwriter: John Lennon
- Producers: John Lennon; Yoko Ono

John Lennon singles chronology
"Borrowed Time" (1984)	"I'm Stepping Out" (1984)	"Every Man Has a Woman Who Loves Him" (1984)

"I'm Stepping Out" is the third and last single from the final John Lennon and Yoko Ono album Milk and Honey. In it, Lennon celebrates his enthusiasm for the night life of New York City, and makes tongue-in-cheek reference to his "househusband" period. It reached No. 88 in the UK Singles chart, and in the US it peaked at No. 55 in the US Billboard Hot 100 and number 57 on the Cashbox Top 100.

The B-side features Ono's "Sleepless Night."

== Recording ==
"I'm Stepping Out" was the first song to be recorded when the sessions for Double Fantasy and Milk and Honey began at The Hit Factory in New York City on 7 August 1980.

== Reception ==
Cash Box said that the song "was a celebration for Lennon — to escape from the mundane lifestyle of a house-husband — and it is also a musical celebration for the listener which exhibits Lennon's innate talent for articulating universal emotions on three-and-a-half minutes of vinyl." Cash Box also commented on the "accessible lyrics and a tight chorus that Lennon sings with abandon" and noted that the prologue and ending express Lennon's "witty side."

Muriel Gray at Smash Hits said, "For an extraordinary man, John Lennon managed to write a lot of very ordinary material before he died. This is basic and dull, it barely merits criticism."

== Personnel ==
This is the personnel as said.

- John Lennon – vocals, rhythm guitar
- Earl Slick, Hugh McCracken – lead guitar
- Tony Levin – bass guitar
- George Small – keyboards
- Andy Newmark – drums
- Arthur Jenkins – percussion
