= Fear Itself (Fear Itself album) =

Studio album by Fear Itself
- Released: 1968
- Recorded: 1968, The Record Plant, NYC [back cover of CD]
- Genre: Psychedelic blues-rock
- Label: Dot Records, World IN Sound (re-release)
- Producer: Tom Wilson for Rasputin Productions

Professional ratings
Review scores
Source	Rating
Rolling Stone	(positive)

Fear Itself is the 1968 self-titled debut album by psychedelic blues-rock band Fear Itself. The album was produced by Tom Wilson. It was the only album to be released by the band before their breakup after the death of bassist Paul Album. The album features lead vocalist Ellen McIlwaine, who launched a solo career after the group disbanded.

The album was originally released on LP by Dot Records. It was re-released on CD in 2006 by World IN Sound under license from Geffen Records.

== Track listing ==
Side One

1. Crawling Kingsnake (J.L.Hooker, B.Bassman)
2. Underground River (Ellen McIlwaine)
3. Bow'd Up (Ellen McIlwaine)
4. For Suki (Ellen McIlwaine)
5. In My Time Of Dying (Traditional arr. by Ellen McIlwaine)

Side Two

1. The Letter (W.C. Thompson)
2. Lazarus (Traditional arr. by Ellen McIlwaine)
3. Mossy Dream (Ellen McIlwaine)
4. Billy Gene (Ellen McIlwaine)
5. Born Under a Bad Sign (Booker T. Jones, William Bell)
