= Frankly a Cappella =

Frankly A Cappella

Studio album by The Persuasions
- Released: 2000
- Genre: Doo-wop
- Length: 43:04
- Label: EarthBeat!, distributed by Rhino Records
- Producer: Rip Rense

Frankly A Cappella: The Persuasions Sing Zappa is a 2000 album by the singing group The Persuasions. Frank Zappa heard them over the phone while they were singing in a record shop on the East Coast and flew them out to L.A. to record their first LP, in 1969, for Zappa's label. The album was the brainchild of Rip Rense, a friend of Zappa, as a tribute to the late composer. Rense executive produced and worked with lead singer/arranger Jerry Lawson on selecting the tracks and guest artists, who included Zappa alums Bruce Fowler, Robert Martin, Mike Keneally. Gary Mankin and Lawson co-produced the music, and Gail Zappa had final approval of the project. All arrangements by Jerry Lawson. The album is the first of several in which The Persuasions paid tribute to the songs of a specific group or artist.

Rense also conceived of and produced The Persuasions on "Persuasions of the Dead" (2011), a two-disc Grateful Dead tribute album for the Zoho Roots label.

== Reception ==
Professional ratings
Review scores
| Source | Rating |
|---|---|
| AllMusic | 4/5 stars |
| The Encyclopedia of Popular Music | 4/5 stars |
| Recorded A Cappella Review Board | 4.0/5 |

Billboard reviewed the album positively, describing it as "a work of absurdist inspiration" and "a novel reworking of a true original". François Couture writing on AllMusic gave the recording a rating of 3/5, mentioning that "vocal group fans may feel a bit disoriented by this unlikely repertoire and the hermetic references, but Zappa aficionados [...] will find Frankly a Cappella to be an entertaining work of love."

Bill Kisliuk, writing for The Boston Phoenix, classifies the album as "among the most spirited and adventurous albums ever by the group", defining it "cacophonous, bizarre, cynical, and riddled".

== Track listing ==
Songs composed by Frank Zappa.

1. "Lumpy Gravy"
2. "Any Way the Wind Blows"
3. "Electric Aunt Jemima"
4. "The Meek Shall Inherit Nothing"
5. "Interlude"
6. "Cheap Thrills"
7. "Hotplate Heaven at the Green Hotel"
8. "Love of My Life"
9. "You Are What You Is"
10. "Interlude 2"
11. "Harder Than Your Husband"
12. "Find Her Finer"
13. "Interlude 3"
14. "My Guitar Wants to Kill Your Momma"
15. "Tears Began to Fall"
16. "Mystery Track"
