= In Flight (Barenaked Ladies album) =

Studio album by Barenaked Ladies
- Released: 15 September 2023
- Recorded: March–May 2023
- Studios: Noble Street Studios; Vespa Studios
- Genre: Pop rock
- Length: 50:22
- Label: Raisin' Records
- Producer: Eric Ratz

Barenaked Ladies chronology
Detour de Force (2021)	In Flight (2023)

Singles from In Flight
- 1. "Lovin' Life" Released: June 23, 2023; 2. "Too Old" Released: July 21, 2023; 3. "One Night" Released: August 18, 2023; 4. "What Do We Need?" Released: September 15, 2023

In Flight is the fourteenth studio album by Canadian rock band Barenaked Ladies, released on 15 September 2023 through Raisin' Records. The album was produced by Eric Ratz and recorded between March and May 2023 at Noble Street Studios and Vespa Studios in Toronto.

== Background and recording ==
The album follows the band's 2021 release Detour de Force. Recording sessions took place in Toronto in early 2023, with production handled by Eric Ratz.

== Composition ==
In Flight incorporates elements of pop rock with additional influences from folk and acoustic styles. Several songs feature a lighter, melodic approach, while others emphasize slower tempos and reflective lyrics.

== Release and promotion ==
The album was released in physical and digital formats, including CD, vinyl, cassette, and streaming platforms. A deluxe edition with additional tracks was later made available digitally.

To support the release, the band announced a tour of the United Kingdom in April 2024, followed by a North American tour running from May through November 2024, with Toad the Wet Sprocket as a supporting act.

== Critical reception ==
In Flight received mixed to positive reviews. Sputnikmusic described the album as a return to a more acoustic-oriented sound. Audiophix was more critical, noting that some tracks lacked energy.

== Track listing ==
All tracks are written by Ed Robertson, except where noted.

No.	Title	Writer(s)	Length
1.	"Lovin' Life"	Ed Robertson; Kevin Griffin; Stevie Aiello	3:34
2.	"One Night"	Ed Robertson; Kevin Griffin	3:17
3.	"Enough Time"	Kevin Hearn	3:03
4.	"What Do We Need?"		3:03
5.	"Just Wait"	Jim Creeggan; Anna Hill	3:38
6.	"Waning Moon"		3:47
7.	"Fifty for a While"		3:11
8.	"Too Old"		3:00
9.	"See the Tower"	Kevin Hearn	3:33
10.	"Wake Up"	Jim Creeggan; Anna Hill; Chris Howden; Max Kerman	3:15
11.	"Clearly Lost"		3:06
12.	"The Dream Hotel"	Kevin Hearn	4:38
13.	"I Am Asking You To"	Ed Robertson; Donovan Woods	4:40
14.	"The Peace Lady"	Kevin Hearn	4:37
Total length:			50:22

The vinyl edition includes two bonus tracks: "Hard to Do" and "Make Yourself Uncomfortable".

== Personnel ==
Credits adapted from the album's liner notes.

Barenaked Ladies

- Ed Robertson – lead vocals, acoustic and electric guitar, bass on "Wake Up", drums on "Enough Time" and "The Dream Hotel", claps and snaps
- Jim Creeggan – bass guitar, double bass, ukulele, violin pizzicato, claps, backing vocals, lead vocals on "Just Wait" and "Wake Up"
- Kevin Hearn – pianos, keyboards, continuum, organ, accordion, electric and acoustic guitar, mandolin, melodica, loops, claps and snaps, backing vocals, lead vocals on "Enough Time", "See the Tower", "The Dream Hotel", and "The Peace Lady"
- Tyler Stewart – drums, percussion, timpani, bongos, claps and snaps, backing vocals

Additional Musicians

- Kendal Carson – fiddle, violin
- Tom Moffett – trumpet
- Ernesto Barahoma – trombone
- Marc Hickox – claps
- Kate & Pippa Boothman – claps and snaps
- Eric Ratz – drum programming
- Lyle Herbert-Robertson – backing vocals on "The Peace Lady"
- Hannah You – backing vocals on "Enough Time"

Production

- Eric Ratz – producer, mixing
- Kenny Luong – engineering
- Zachariah Pepe – assistant engineering
- Jasper Terpstra – assistant engineering
- Ted Jensen – mastering
- Matt Barnes – photography
- Doug Erb – package design
