= Grinning Streak =

Studio album by Barenaked Ladies
- Released: 4 June 2013
- Recorded: May 2012; February–April 2013
- Studios: Noble Street Studios; Revolution Recording; Jimmy C's (Toronto, Ontario)
- Genre: Alternative rock
- Length: 44:46
- Label: Vanguard
- Producers: Howie Beck; Gavin Brown

Barenaked Ladies chronology
| Stop Us If You've Heard This One Before (2012) | Grinning Streak (2013) | The Long Weekend EP (2014) |

Singles from Grinning Streak
- 1. "Boomerang" Released: 26 March 2013; 2. "Odds Are" Released: 14 July 2013; 3. "Did I Say That Out Loud?" Released: 31 January 2014

Professional ratings
Aggregate scores
| Source | Rating |
|---|---|
| Metacritic | 57/100 |
Review scores
| Source | Rating |
| Allmusic | 3.5/5 stars |
| Mojo | 3/5 stars |
| Montreal Gazette | 3/5 stars |
| Popmatters | 4/10 stars |
| Q | 2/5 stars |
| Uncut | 3.5/5 stars |

Grinning Streak is the tenth full-length original-material studio album by Barenaked Ladies, released on 4 June 2013 on Vanguard Records. It is the band's first album on Vanguard. The album was recorded February–April 2013 in separate sessions with Howie Beck and Gavin Brown The first single, "Boomerang" was recorded in a separate session produced by Brown in May 2012, initially for release that summer.

== Commercial performance ==
Grinning Streak debuted at No. 10 on the Billboard 200 chart, selling 26,000 copies in its first week. It is the band's highest position on the chart since their album Everything to Everyone also debuted at No. 10 in 2003. Grinning Streak also debuted at No. 12 on Canada's Top Album Chart, and No. 101 on the UK Albums Chart. The album has sold 68,000 copies in the US as of May 2015.

== Released versions ==
Grinning Streak was released in CD and digital download format, as well as a vinyl edition, which was made available for sale at the Last Summer on Earth 2013 shows.

Versions with bonus tracks were released on the Canadian iTunes Store, and in a Target-exclusive version in the United States; the former including an extra remix not included in the latter.

On 1 July 2014, a new Grinning Streak Deluxe digital package was released in the U.S.s including the three bonus tracks from the Target edition, along with three newly recorded acoustics. These new tracks were released in Canada on The Long Weekend EP. Additionally, a live version of "Did I Say That Out Loud?" is included on The Long Weekend EP, but not on the Grinning Streak Deluxe digital package.

== Track listing ==
All tracks are written by Ed Robertson, except where noted.

| No. | Title | Writer(s) | Lead Vocal(s) | Length |
|---|---|---|---|---|
| 1. | "Limits" | | Ed Robertson | 4:28 |
| 2. | "Boomerang" (Bob Clearmountain Mix) | Ed Robertson; Zac Maloy | Ed Robertson | 2:34 |
| 3. | "Off His Head" | | Ed Robertson | 4:10 |
| 4. | "Gonna Walk" | Ed Robertson; Kevin Griffin | Ed Robertson | 2:40 |
| 5. | "Odds Are" | Ed Robertson; Kevin Griffin | Ed Robertson | 3:02 |
| 6. | "Keepin' It Real" | | Ed Robertson | 3:31 |
| 7. | "Give It Back to You" | | Ed Robertson | 2:46 |
| 8. | "Best Damn Friend" | | Ed Robertson | 3:48 |
| 9. | "Did I Say That Out Loud?" | Ed Robertson; Kevin Griffin | Ed Robertson | 2:28 |
| 10. | "Daydreamin'" | Kevin Hearn | Kevin Hearn | 5:45 |
| 11. | "Smile" | | Ed Robertson | 2:26 |
| 12. | "Crawl" | | Ed Robertson | 6:47 |

Canadian iTunes bonus tracks
| No. | Title | Writer(s) | Lead Vocal(s) | Length |
|---|---|---|---|---|
| 13. | "Blacking Out" | Ed Robertson; Ian LeFeuvre | Ed Robertson | 4:09 |
| 14. | "Fog of Writing" | | Ed Robertson | 5:13 |
| 15. | "Who Knew?" | Jim Creeggan | Jim Creeggan | 3:12 |
| 16. | "Boomerang" (Mark Endert Mix) | Ed Robertson; Zac Maloy | Ed Robertson | 2:45 |

Target bonus tracks
| No. | Title | Writer(s) | Lead Vocal(s) | Length |
|---|---|---|---|---|
| 13. | "Blacking Out" | Ed Robertson; Ian LeFeuvre | Ed Robertson | 4:09 |
| 14. | "Fog of Writing" | | Ed Robertson | 5:13 |
| 15. | "Who Knew?" | Jim Creeggan | Jim Creeggan | 3:12 |

Grinning Streak Deluxe (2014)
| No. | Title | Writer(s) | Lead Vocal(s) | Length |
|---|---|---|---|---|
| 13. | "Blacking Out" | Ed Robertson; Ian LeFeuvre | Ed Robertson | 4:09 |
| 14. | "Fog of Writing" | | Ed Robertson | 5:13 |
| 15. | "Who Knew?" | Jim Creeggan | Jim Creeggan | 3:12 |
| 16. | "Odds Are" (acoustic) | Ed Robertson; Kevin Griffin | Ed Robertson | 3:06 |
| 17. | "Smile" (acoustic) | | Ed Robertson | 2:36 |
| 18. | "Blame It On Me" (acoustic) | Steven Page; Ed Robertson | Ed Robertson | 4:44 |

== Personnel ==
- Jim Creeggan – double bass, electric bass, background vocals, lead vocals ("Who Knew?")
- Kevin Hearn – piano, synthesizers, keyboards, celeste, accordion, melodica, acoustic and electric guitars, mandolin, banjo, background vocals, lead vocals ("Daydreaming")
- Ed Robertson – lead vocals, acoustic and electric guitars, Magnus air organ, background vocals
- Tyler Stewart – drums, percussion, background vocals

Additional:

- Gavin Brown – programming
- John Scholz – trenchwork
- Chris Stapleton – starring as being Stapes
- Nora Patterson – background vocals ("Odds Are")

== Charts ==
| Chart (2010) | Peak position |
|---|---|
| Canadian Albums (Billboard) | 12 |
| US Billboard 200 | 10 |
| US Digital Albums (Billboard) | 4 |
| US Top Rock Albums (Billboard) | 5 |
| US Top Album Sales (Billboard) | 10 |
