= Fear Itself (band) =

Fear Itself was a short-lived psychedelic blues-rock band formed by Ellen McIlwaine in the late 1960s in Atlanta, Georgia. The band featured McIlwaine on lead vocals and playing harmonica, rhythm guitar and organ. Chris Zaloom played lead guitar, and Bill McCord was on drums. Steve Cook played bass guitar and was the bassist on the band's one album, the self-titled Fear Itself. However, Cook left, and was replaced by Paul Album on bass.

For most of its time together the group was based in New York City and was part of the Greenwich Village music scene. The group performed at Woodstock Sound-Outs mini-festival in 1968.

The band's only album was released in 1968 on LP by Dot Records. It was produced by Tom Wilson.

After the album was released, Paul Album was killed in a car crash caused by a drunk driver. Following this the group separated. McIlwaine later moved to Canada and started a solo career.

The album was re-issued on CD in 2006 by World In Sound.

== Discography ==
- Fear Itself (1968; re-released 2006)
