= Ellen McIlwaine =

American musician (1945–2021)

- Born: October 1, 1945; Nashville, Tennessee, United States
- Died: June 23, 2021 (aged 75) Calgary, Alberta, Canada
- Genres: Blues; blues rock
- Occupations: Singer-songwriter, slide guitarist
- Instruments: Guitar, piano, harmonica
- Years active: 1960s–2021

Ellen McIlwaine (October 1, 1945 – June 23, 2021) was an American-born singer-songwriter and musician best known for her career as a solo singer, songwriter and slide guitarist.

== Biography ==
Born in Nashville, Tennessee, United States, McIlwaine was adopted by missionaries and raised in Kobe, Japan, giving her exposure to multiple languages and cultures. She attended the Canadian Academy school in Kobe, graduating in 1963. Her first experience in music was playing Ray Charles, Fats Domino and Professor Longhair songs on piano that she heard on Japanese radio. On moving back to the United States she bought a guitar, beginning a stage career in Atlanta, Georgia in the mid-1960s.

In 1966, McIlwaine had a stint in New York City's Greenwich Village where she opened every night at the Cafe Au Go Go, playing with Jimi Hendrix, and opening for Muddy Waters, Sonny Terry and Brownie McGhee, and Big Joe Williams. She returned to Atlanta to form the band Fear Itself, a psychedelic blues rock band.

After recording one album with Fear Itself, McIlwaine went solo, recording two albums for Polydor, Honky Tonk Angel (1972) and We the People (1973), the latter featuring a hit single, "I Don't Want to Play". Those albums, and most of her work since, have featured McIlwaine's approach to acoustic slide guitar. This was followed by The Real Ellen McIlwaine, recorded for the independent Canadian label Kot'ai, which featured two of her 'signature' songs, her slide guitar version of Stevie Wonder's "Higher Ground" and "The Secret In This Lady's Heart".

As a female vocalist who is known for her acoustic and electric slide guitar, her music tends to be classified in the folk sections of record stores, despite her strong roots in blues, gospel soul and rock music, and her cover versions of songs by Isaac Hayes, Stevie Wonder, Jack Bruce, Jimi Hendrix, Steve Winwood and Browning Bryant. McIlwaine met Hendrix in New York in 1966, briefly played with him and wrote "Underground River" about him. She was an ardent fan of Jack Bruce and recorded a version of a song by Bruce and his lyricist Pete Brown on each of her first four solo albums - notably songs from Bruce's first solo album Songs for a Tailor, as well as songs associated with Bruce (such as "Born Under A Bad Sign"). This culminated in her collaboration with Bruce himself on her fourth solo album, Everybody Needs It (1982), which won the NAIRD Indie Award.

By the mid-1970s, McIlwaine's songs "Sliding", "We the People" and "Losing You" were included on the compilation album, The Guitar Album.

McIlwaine's album The Real Ellen McIlwaine, was recorded in Montreal in 1975 for the Kotai label, and included the Stevie Wonder song "Higher Ground". Her intro later appeared on David Holmes' Essential Mix (1997).

McIlwaine gained a cult following in Australia thanks to exposure of her music on the Sydney-based AM public rock radio station 2JJ (now Triple-J). In 1980 she made her first tour of Australia, after being spotted by the Australian singer-guitarist Margret RoadKnight, who was one of the co-promoters of the tour. She returned to Australia in 1984, and during this tour was the last performer to appear at Sydney's historic Regent Theatre prior to its closure and subsequent demolition.

After moving to Canada in 1987, (first Toronto, later Alberta), McIlwaine recorded Looking for Trouble for Stony Plain Records, which also re-released her early vinyl material on CD. Her next CD Women in (e)motion Festival/Ellen McIlwaine, was recorded live in Germany in 1999; and then Spontaneous Combustion featuring Taj Mahal on the German Tradition und Moderne label.

In spite of debilitating arthritis in her hips, she undertook a third tour of Australia and New Zealand in 2003, which reunited her with RoadKnight and the other Honky Tonk Angels, who had first brought her to Australia in 1980.

In 2006 she started her own label, Ellen McIlwaine Music, and released Mystic Bridge featuring the Indian tabla drummer Cassius Khan. They were joined by the soprano saxophone of Linsey Wellman on three tracks, including their version of "Take Me to the River", and harmonium playing by Amika Kushwaha on the last track, "The Question". This was a poem by Christine Steele, recited over Cassius Khan's vocal rendition of the ancient Urdu poem set to music, "Darbari Raag". The album was widely successful with critical acclaim.

In 2008, 2009, and 2010 she toured with Patty Larkin's La Guitara ensemble in the US, and in Canada with Sue Foley's Guitar Women, and appeared at various US and Canadian venues and festivals as a solo artist. In 2013 she traveled to Los Angeles to be part of the Jimi Hendrix documentary Hear My Train A Comin'. In 2019, McIlwaine was awarded Toronto Blues Society's "Blues with a Feeling" Lifetime Achievement Award.

McIlwaine died on June 23, 2021, in her long-time residence of Calgary, Alberta, Canada. She had been diagnosed with esophageal cancer just six weeks prior.

She was the subject of Goddess of Slide, a 2024 documentary film by Alfonso Maiorana.

== Discography ==
=== As principal artist ===
- Fear Itself (1969, with Fear Itself)
- Honky Tonk Angel (1972)
- We the People (1973)
- The Real Ellen McIlwaine (1975)
- Ellen McIlwaine (1978) – AUS No. 84
- Everybody Needs It (1982)
- Looking For Trouble (1987)
- Up From the Skies: The Polydor Years (1998, compilation)
- Women in (e)motion Festival/Ellen McIlwaine (1999)
- Spontaneous Combustion (2001)
- Live at Yellow (2002, Japanese release)
- Mystic Bridge (2006, with Cassius Khan)
- Ellen McIlwaine - Live in Gray Creek (2010)

=== Compilation inclusions ===
- The Guitar Album (1974, Polydor)
- Saturday Night Blues: 20 Years (2006, CBC)
