= Odds Are =

Single by Barenaked Ladies

from the album Grinning Streak
- Released: July 14, 2013
- Recorded: February–April 2013
- Genre: Alternative rock
- Length: 3:02
- Label: Raisin'/Vanguard Records
- Songwriter(s): Ed Robertson, Kevin Griffin
- Producer(s): Gavin Brown

Barenaked Ladies singles chronology
"Boomerang" (2013)	"Odds Are" (2013)	"Did I Say That Out Loud?" (2014)

"Odds Are" is a song by Canadian rock band Barenaked Ladies. It is the second single from their 2013 album, Grinning Streak. It was released as a promotional single on July 14, 2013. The song is also the theme song for the television show Working the Engels.

== History ==
"Odds Are" was written by Ed Robertson and Kevin Griffin, lead vocalist and guitarist from Better Than Ezra. "Odds Are" was recorded during the sessions for "Grinning Streak" from February to April 2013, and was produced by multi-platinum, multi-Juno Award-winning producer Gavin Brown. The band first premiered the song live on May 5, 2013 at Sunfest on the Waterfront in West Palm Beach, Florida.

In 2017, American singer/songwriter Kalie Shorr released her EP titled "Slingshot" which featured a country/pop version of "Odds Are".

== Music video ==
Rooster Teeth Productions produced the music video for "Odds Are" released on October 8. The video features the band as news anchors reporting on the apocalypse occurring at the same time. Many Rooster Teeth personalities are featured as cameo guests including Barbara Dunkelman, Gavin Free, Burnie Burns, Gus Sorola, and Adam Kovic, with several internet personalities such as Justine Ezarik, Freddie Wong, and Greg Miller making appearances as well.

== Charts ==
Chart performance for "Odds Are"
Chart (2013)	Peak position
Canada (Canadian Hot 100)	89
Canada AC (Billboard)	16
