= Bittersweet Harmony =

Studio album by Skydiggers
- Released: March 11, 2003
- Recorded: Chemical Sound Toronto, Hillside Estates Toronto, February 2002
- Genre: Roots rock
- Label: Maplemusic Recordings
- Producers: Ian Blurton, Hawksley Workman

Skydiggers chronology
There and Back (2000)	Bittersweet Harmony (2003)	Skydiggers/Cash Brothers (2006)

Professional ratings
Review scores
Source	Rating
Allmusic	link

Bittersweet Harmony is a 2003 album by Canadian roots rock band Skydiggers. It was their first album of new material since 1997's Desmond's Hip City. (Still Restless: The Lost Tapes, released in 1999, was a release of older material.)

A limited edition advance version of the album was released in 2002. That version had a different cover and did not include the track "All of Our Dreaming".

== Track listing ==
All tracks written by Finlayson/Maize unless otherwise noted.

1. "Anything for You"
2. "Kings"
3. "Fall Apart"
4. "Horseshoe Bay"
5. "Elizabeth Josephine"
6. "Jane's Gone"
7. "Sweet Heartache"
8. "California"
9. "See You Again" (Macleod)
10. "Wherever You Go"
11. "Back Out on the Road"
12. "All of Our Dreaming"
13. "Just Love Again"
14. "Everybody's Girl"
