= Black Flowers =

Studio album by Art of Time Ensemble featuring Sarah Slean
- Released: June 2, 2009
- Recorded: February 13–15, 2008
- Genres: Avant-garde; popular; cabaret; jazz; classical
- Length: 47:43
- Label: Pheremone
- Producer: Jonathan Goldsmith

Art of Time Ensemble chronology
Live In Toronto (2006)	Black Flowers (2009)	A Singer Must Die (2010)

Black Flowers is a 2009 album by the Canadian music organization Art of Time Ensemble featuring singer Sarah Slean.

On May 10 and 11, 2007, Sarah Slean was the featured artist in the Art of Time Ensemble's Songbook series, which is "artistic director Andrew Burashko's pursuit to present music - avant-garde, popular, cabaret, jazz, classical - in ways audiences haven't experienced." Black Flowers was released on June 2, 2009 through Pheromone Recordings.

== Track listing ==
No.	Title	Writer(s)	Arranger	Length
1.	"Hey That's No Way To Say Goodbye"	Leonard Cohen	Gavin Bryars	3:52
2.	"Black Flowers"	Lynn Miles	Kevin Fox	4:59
3.	"I'll Never Tear You Apart"	Martin Tielli	Jonathan Goldsmith	4:03
4.	"Lodestar"	Sarah Harmer	Roberto Occhipinti	5:34
5.	"To Cry About"	Mary Margaret O'Hara	Bruce Cassidy	5:07
6.	"Dandelion Wine"	Ron Sexsmith	Aaron Davis	5:53
7.	"Eyes Are The Flowers"	John Southworth	Michael Occhipinti	6:33
8.	"Monarch"	Feist	Cameron Wilson	5:48
9.	"Dress Rehearsal Rag"	Leonard Cohen	Jim McGrath	6:24
Total length:				47:43

== Personnel ==
- Sarah Slean - Vocals
- Andrew Burashko - Piano
- Ben Bowman - Violin
- John Johnson - Clarinet, Flute, Tenor Saxophone & Soprano Saxophone
- George Koller - Bass
- Rob Piltch - Guitar
- Shauna Rolston - Cello

== Production ==
- Jonathan Goldsmith - Producer
- Walter Sobczak - Engineer

Recorded at Puck's Farm, February 13–15, 2008.
