= Sheard =

Sheard is a surname. Notable people with the surname include:

- Charles Sheard (1857–1929), Canadian medical doctor, public health official and politician
- Jabaal Sheard (born 1989), American football defensive end
- John Sheard, Canadian pianist, producer and arranger
- Joseph Sheard (1813–1883), Canadian architect and politician
- Karen Clark Sheard (born 1960), American gospel singer, musician, and songwriter
- Kierra Sheard (born 1987), American gospel recording artist
- Les Sheard, English rugby union player and coach
- Mia Sheard, Canadian pop singer-songwriter
- Michael Sheard (1938–2005), Scottish actor
- Paul Sheard (born 1954), Australian economist
- Rod Sheard (born 1951), British-Australian architect
- Sarah Sheard (born 1953), Canadian novelist
- Titus Sheard (1841–1904), American businessman and politician
- Tom Sheard (1889–1954), Manx motorcycle racer
- Virna Sheard (1862–1943), Canadian poet and writer
