= A Different Sort of Solitude =

Single by Steven Page
- Released: January 17, 2012
- Recorded: 2011–2012
- Genre: Pop rock, alternative rock
- Length: 8:36
- Label: Anthem/Universal (Canada), Zoe/Rounder (US)
- Songwriter: Steven Page
- Producer: Steven Page

Steven Page singles chronology
"Over Joy" (2010)	"A Different Sort of Solitude" (2012)	"White Noise" (2018)

A Different Sort of Solitude is a single by Steven Page. It was released January 17, 2012. It contains two non-album tracks. "A Different Sort of Solitude" was written and recorded for the film French Immersion. The b-side, "Manchild", was co-written with Craig Northey of the Vancouver-based band Odds. On the same day as the release of the single, the song received a Genie Award nomination for Best Original Song at the 32nd Genie Awards.

== Track listing ==
No.	Title	Writer(s)	Length
1.	"A Different Sort of Solitude"	Steven Page	3:56
2.	"Manchild"	Craig Northey, Page	4:40
Total length:			8:36
