= Ben Bowen (musician) =

Canadian trumpet player (born 1976)

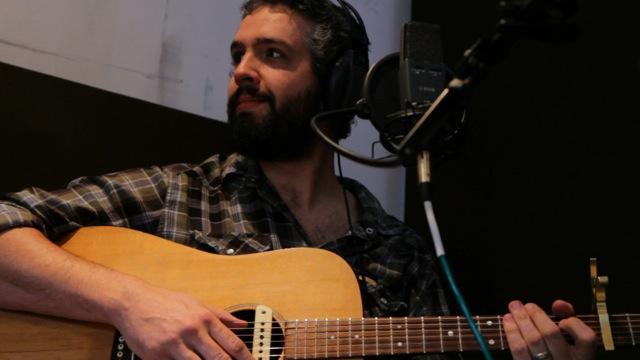
- Ben Bowen in studio, 2011

Background information
- Born: 5 June 1976 (age 49)
- Genres: children's music; pop; folk music
- Occupations: musician; songwriter
- Years active: 2001–present
- Website: www.benbowen.ca

Ben Bowen (born 5 June 1976 in England) is a Canadian trumpet player and children's musician from Hamilton, Ontario, Canada. Bowen studied jazz trumpet at York University and Humber College. He is a session musician for various other bands and as of 2024 has been involved in over 40 studio albums.

== Recent work ==
Breaking from his role as horn-player, in December 2011 he released a 5-song debut EP of traditional children's songs entitled The Bumblebee EP, which one reviewer called "wonderfully gentle and soothing." Bowen sings and plays guitar on this recording, backed by his sister Anna Bowen on accordion and vocals, and his brother-in-law Ben on mandolin and vocals. It was recorded by singer-songwriter Nick Zubeck at Cardinal Song studios in Guelph, and released on iTunes.

== Accolades ==
In 2024 Bowen received a Canadian Folk Music Award nomination for Children's Album of the Year at the 19th Canadian Folk Music Awards.

In June of 2024, he won a City of Hamilton Arts Award in the "Creator Awards" category. on his birthday!

== Discography ==
- The Bumblebee EP (2012)
- Let's Sing a Song, Vol. 1 (2017)
- Beautiful Day (2017)
- Let's Sing a Song, Vol. 2 (2017)
- O Watch the Stars (2018)
- Sleep Now – Lullabies (2019)
- Here Comes the Train (2023)

== Session work ==
Since 2003 Bowen has worked on numerous albums as a session musician. He has played and recorded with a number of notable Canadian artists, including Lily Frost, Great Aunt Ida, Junetile, A Northern Chorus, Valery Gore, Nick Zubeck, Brian MacMillan, Bellewoods, and Old World Vulture.

- Danny Medakovic − Jolley Cut (2014)
- Old World Vulture − Trophy Lovers (2012)
- Great Aunt Ida − Nuclearize Me (2012)
- Valery Gore − Avalanche to Wandering Bear (2008); trumpet on "Scared", "Great Lakes and Sparrow"
- A Northern Chorus − The Millions Too Many (2007); brass on "The Millions Too Many", "No Stations", "Canadian Shield and Ethic of the Pioneer"
