= Jim Witter =

- Birth name: James Russell Witter
- Born: November 2, 1964 (age 60)
- Origin: Hamilton, Ontario, Canada
- Genres: Country, contemporary Christian music
- Occupation(s): Singer, songwriter, producer
- Instrument(s): Vocals, piano, guitar
- Years active: 1993–present
- Labels: FRE, Curb
- Website: thepianomen.net

James Russell Witter (born November 2, 1964) is a Canadian award-winning country music and Christian music singer/songwriter. Ten of Witter's songs reached the top 10 on Canadian country radio.

== Biography ==
Jim Witter grew up playing music. In 1982, he performed four songs on the "Music for Safe Water" compilation by 820 CHAM radio. As a teenager, while still in high school, Jim honed his musical talents by playing evenings at a piano bar and restaurant called Snuggles, in Hamilton Ont. In 1990, one of Witter's demos caught the attention of a Sony Music Canada executive. Within three years, Witter was signed to FRE Records. His debut album, Jim Witter, was released in 1993. The first single, "Everything and More," entered the National Country Chart at No. 40, at the time a first for a debut Canadian single. Every single released from the album reached the top 10 on the Canadian country singles chart, including "Distant Drum," "Stolen Moments," "Sweet Sweet Poison" and "Chevy Coupe." Witter received a 1994 Juno nomination for Best New Solo Artist, an award that covered all genres of music, as well as a nomination for Best Country Male Vocalist.

Witter signed a songwriting deal with Curb Records in 1999. That resulted in a record deal and the release of his second album, All My Life, in both Canada and the United States. He continued his string of hits in Canada with songs like "All My Life," "Jumpin' Right In," "Tough As A Pickup Truck," "One Beat at a Time" and "One Hundred Years." Unfortunately, none of his singles reached Billboard's Hot Country Songs chart in the U.S.

When it came time to go back into the studio, Witter was encouraged by Mike Curb to record a Christian record. The result was his third album, 2003's Forgiveness. The album received a nomination at the 2004 GMA Dove Awards for Album of the Year.

Witter is currently performing in The Piano Men, a tribute to the music of the 1970s, performing the songs of Billy Joel and Elton John.

== Discography ==
=== Studio albums ===
| Title | Details |
|---|---|
| Jim Witter | Release date: November 12, 1993; Label: FRE Records |
| All My Life | Release date: October 11, 1999; Label: Curb Records |
| Forgiveness | Release date: January 14, 2003; Label: Curb Records |

=== Singles ===
| Year | Single | Peak positions | Album |
| Year | Single | CAN Country | Album |
|---|---|---|---|
| 1993 | "Everything and More" | 5 | Jim Witter |
| 1993 | "Distant Drum" | 4 | Jim Witter |
| 1993 | "Stolen Moments" | 5 | Jim Witter |
| 1994 | "Sweet Sweet Poison" | 6 | Jim Witter |
| 1994 | "Human Highway" (with Cassandra Vasik) | 24 | Borrowed Tunes: A Tribute to Neil Young |
| 1994 | "Chevy Coupe" | 6 | Jim Witter |
| 1999 | "All My Life" | 8 | All My Life |
| 1999 | "Jumpin' Right In" | 10 | All My Life |
| 1999 | "Tough as a Pickup Truck" | 7 | All My Life |
| 2000 | "One Beat at a Time" | 7 | All My Life |
| 2001 | "One Hundred Years" | * | All My Life |
| 2001 | "I Want You to Want Me" | * | All My Life |
| 2003 | "Forgiveness" | * | Forgiveness |
| 2003 | "You Are the Sun" | * | Forgiveness |
| 2003 | "Turn! Turn! Turn!" | * | Forgiveness |
* denotes unknown peak positions

=== Music videos ===
| Year | Video | Director |
|---|---|---|
| 1993 | "Everything and More" | Keith Harrick |
| 1993 | "Distant Drum" | |
| 1993 | "Stolen Moments" | Keith Harrick |
| 1999 | "All My Life" | Warren P. Sonoda |
| 1999 | "Tough as a Pickup Truck" | |
| 2000 | "One Beat at a Time" | |
| 2003 | "Turn! Turn! Turn!" | Antonio Hrynchuk |

== Awards and recognition ==
Canadian Country Music Awards

- 1994 Video of the Year: "Stolen Moments"
- 1995 Vocal Collaboration Of The Year
- 1996 Vocal Collaboration Of The Year

GMA Dove Awards

- 2004 nominee, Inspirational Album of the Year: Forgiveness

Juno Awards

- 1994 nominee, Country Male Vocalist of the Year
- 1994 nominee, Best New Solo Artist
- 1995 nominee, Country Male Vocalist of the Year
- 2000 nominee, Best Country Male Artist
- 2004 nominee, Contemporary Christian/Gospel Album of the Year: Forgiveness
