= Indecision (Steven Page song) =

Single by Steven Page

from the album Page One
- Released: 27 July 2010
- Recorded: 2010
- Genre: Pop rock
- Length: 2:54
- Label: Anthem/Universal (Canada); Zoë/Rounder (US)
- Songwriter(s): Steven Page, Stephen Duffy
- Producer(s): Steven Page, John Fields

Steven Page singles chronology
"Wilted Rose" (2005)	"Indecision" (2010)	"Over Joy" (2010)

"Indecision" is the first single from Steven Page's solo album, Page One. The song was written by Steven Page with Stephen Duffy. It was released to US and Canadian iTunes, as well as Page's official site for download on 27 July 2010.

== Music video ==
The music video for "Indecision" debuted on 9 October 2010.
