= Skydiggers (album) =

Studio album by Skydiggers
- Released: 1990
- Studio: Phase One Toronto
- Genre: Folk rock
- Labels: Enigma, Capitol
- Producers: Skydiggers, Andrew Scarth

Skydiggers chronology
Skydiggers (1990)	Restless (1992)

Skydiggers is the debut album by the Canadian band Skydiggers, released in 1990.

The album's most successful single was "I Will Give You Everything".

== Critical reception ==
The Edmonton Journal opined that "the blandness of the lead vocal and the low-level drone of careful, undynamic tempos incites only one reaction—irritation."

== Track listing ==
1. "Monday Morning" (P.Cash/Finlayson/Macey/Maize/Stokes) – 2:26
2. "At 24" (P.Cash) – 2:27
3. "Maybe It's Just Not Good Enough" (P.Cash/Finlayson/Maize/Macey/Stokes) – 4:02
4. "Baby Make a Grab" (Finlayson/Maize) – 2:54
5. "I Will Give You Everything" (Finlayson/Maize) – 3:56
6. "Leslie" (Finlayson/Maize/Stokes) – 2:25
7. "We Don't Talk Much Anymore" (P. Cash) – 2:12
8. "I'll Be Home" (P.Cash) – 3:04
9. "Too Bad You Say It's Over" (Archibald/Finlayson/Maize/Stokes) – 2:24
10. "Some Say" (P.Cash) – 3:36
11. "What Can I Say" (P.Cash) – 3:39
12. "No One Could" (P.Cash) – 3:05
