= Chevy Coupe =

Single by Jim Witter

from the album Jim Witter
- Released: 1994
- Genre: Country
- Length: 3:42
- Label: FRE
- Songwriters: Jim Witter; Johnny Douglas
- Producer: Johnny Douglas

Jim Witter singles chronology
| "Human Highway" (1994) | "Chevy Coupe" (1994) | "All My Life" (1999) |

"Chevy Coupe" is a song recorded by Canadian country music artist Jim Witter. It was released in 1994 as the fifth single from his debut album, Jim Witter. It peaked at number 6 on the RPM Country Tracks chart in February 1995.

== Chart performance ==
| Chart (1994–1995) | Peak position |
|---|---|
| Canada Country Singles (RPM) | 6 |

=== Year-end charts ===
| Chart (1995) | Position |
|---|---|
| Canada Country Tracks (RPM) | 93 |
