= Distant Drum =

Single by Jim Witter

from the album Jim Witter
- Released: 1993
- Genre: Country
- Length: 2:48
- Label: FRE
- Songwriters: Jim Witter; Johnny Douglas
- Producer: Johnny Douglas

Jim Witter singles chronology
"Everything and More" (1993)	"Distant Drum" (1993)	"Stolen Moments" (1993)

"Distant Drum" is a song recorded by Canadian country music artist Jim Witter. It was released in 1993 as the second single from his debut album, Jim Witter. It peaked at number 4 on the RPM Country Tracks chart in September 1993.

== Chart performance ==
Chart (1993)	Peak position
Canada Country Singles (RPM)	4

=== Year-end charts ===
Chart (1993)	Position
Canada Country Tracks (RPM)	60
