= Restless (Skydiggers album) =

Studio album by Skydiggers
- Released: 1992
- Studios: Grant Avenue, Hamilton; Umbrella, Toronto
- Genre: Roots rock
- Label: FRE/Capitol
- Producers: John Oliveira, Skydiggers

Skydiggers chronology
Skydiggers (1991)	Restless (1992)	Just Over This Mountain (1993)

Restless is an album by the Canadian band Skydiggers, released in 1992. It was the band's most commercially successful release, and produced their biggest chart hit, "A Penny More". The band and album were nominated for two Juno Awards.

In 1996, the album disappeared from Canadian record stores after the band's label, FRE Records, filed for bankruptcy. Although the band pursued litigation to win back the master tapes, they were not successful. As a result, in 1999, they released an alternate version of the album, Still Restless: The Lost Tapes.

== Critical reception ==
Professional ratings
Review scores
Source	Rating
AllMusic	3/5 stars
Calgary Herald	B+

The Toronto Star called the album "so comfy and narcoleptic the band sounds like it's having a tough time staying awake through 11 tracks." The Calgary Herald deemed it "a journal of life's frustrations, an inevitable part of existence," writing that "the Skydiggers capture this plaintive feel better than most bands, pacing their second album like drizzle on a windowsill." The Globe and Mail determined that Restless "recalls at times a folkier version of R.E.M.'s earlier albums, not so much because of the Byrds-like harmonies and jangly guitars but because the plainspoken, soulful songs."

== Track listing ==
1. "Accusations" – 2:42 (Skydiggers)
2. "Feel You Closer" – 2:24 (P.Cash)
3. "A Penny More" – 4:15 (Finlayson/Maize)
4. "Restless (It's Alright)" – 2:33 (Finlayson/Maize)
5. "This Old Town" – 2:42 (P.Cash)
6. "Swamp Boogie" – 3:11 (P.Cash)
7. "Don't Blame It on Me" – 3:22 (P.Cash)
8. "I Don't Know Why" – 3:56 (P.Cash)
9. "I Don't Want to Talk About It" – 4:54 (Finlayson/Maize)
10. "Just Before the Rain" – 2:34 (P.Cash)
11. "Slow Burning Fire" – 3:24 (J.Buckingham)
12. "It's Sunday Pouring Down Rain" – 2:42 (P.Cash)
13. "She'd Calm Down" – 3:02 (Skydiggers)
