= Sweet Sweet Poison =

Single by Jim Witter

from the album Jim Witter
- Released: 1994
- Genre: Country
- Length: 3:32
- Label: FRE
- Songwriters: Jim Witter; Johnny Douglas
- Producer: Johnny Douglas

Jim Witter singles chronology
"Stolen Moments" (1993)	"Sweet Sweet Poison" (1994)	"Human Highway" (1994)

"Sweet Sweet Poison" is a song recorded by Canadian country music artist Jim Witter. It was released in 1994 as the fourth single from his debut album, Jim Witter. It peaked at number 6 on the RPM Country Tracks chart in June 1994.

== Chart performance ==
Chart (1994)	Peak position
Canada Country Singles (RPM)	6

=== Year-end charts ===
Chart (1994)	Position
Canada Country Tracks (RPM)	76
