= Jim Witter (album) =

Studio album by Jim Witter
- Released: November 12, 1993
- Genre: Country
- Length: 33:05
- Label: FRE
- Producer: Johnny Douglas

Jim Witter chronology
Jim Witter (1993)	All My Life (1999)

Jim Witter is the debut studio album by Canadian country music artist Jim Witter. It was released in 1993 by FRE Records. It includes the Top 10 singles "Everything and More", "Distant Drum", "Stolen Moments", "Sweet Sweet Poison" and "Chevy Coupe".

== Track listing ==
No.	Title	Length
1.	"Distant Drum"	2:48
2.	"Everything and More"	2:51
3.	"Stolen Moments"	3:08
4.	"Sweet Sweet Poison"	3:32
5.	"Hurricane Alley"	2:45
6.	"The Jig Is Up"	2:38
7.	"The Crossing"	4:08
8.	"Hey Brando"	3:37
9.	"When Things Get Back to Normal"	3:13
10.	"Chevy Coupe"	3:42
11.	"Stolen Moments" (reprise)	0:43
Total length:		33:05
