= Still Restless: The Lost Tapes =

Studio album by Skydiggers
- Released: 1999
- Recorded: Umbrella Sound Toronto, Sound Emporium Guelph, Grant Avenue Studio Hamilton
- Genre: Roots rock
- Label: DROG
- Producer: Andy Maize

Skydiggers chronology
| Desmond's Hip City (1997) | Still Restless: The Lost Tapes (1999) | There and Back (2000) |

Professional ratings
Review scores
| Source | Rating |
|---|---|
| Allmusic | 4/5 stars |

Still Restless: The Lost Tapes is a 1999 album by Skydiggers.

The album is a different recording of the band's 1992 disc Restless. The 1996 bankruptcy of FRE Records had left the original album, the band's most popular, unavailable in record stores. When they failed to regain control of the master tapes, the band chose to release the rehearsal tapes they had made prior to the recording of Restless.

The track sequencing is significantly different from that of the original album. One track from Restless, "It's Sunday Pouring Down Rain", was not on the new album; instead, a different version of "Joanne", a track from their 1993 album Just Over This Mountain, was substituted. The album also contains two new tracks, including a rendition of the Christmas carol "Good King Wenceslas".

== Track listing ==
1. "Slow Burnin' Fire" – 3:28 (J.Buckingham)
2. "It's Alright" – 2:33 (Finlayson/Maize)
3. "Swamp Boogie" – 3:26 (P.Cash)
4. "Don't Blame it On Me" – 3:24 (P.Cash)
5. "A Penny More" – 5:51 (Finlayson/Maize)
6. "Accusations" – 2:44 (Skydiggers)
7. "Feel You Closer" – 1:52 (P.Cash)
8. "This Old Town" – 2:30 (P.Cash)
9. "Just Before the Rain" – 2:42 (P.Cash)
10. "I Don't Want to Talk About It" – 4:36 (Finlayson/Maize)
11. "I Don't Know Why" – 3:40 (P.Cash)
12. "She'd Calm Down" – 3:00 (Skydiggers)
13. "Joanne" – 3:14 (Finlayson/Maize)
14. "All Alone" – 3:45 (Skydiggers)
15. "Good King Wenceslas" – 3:52 (Traditional)
