= The Beauties =

Canadian alternative country band

- Origin: Toronto, Ontario, Canada
- Genre: Alternative country
- Years active: 2006–present
- Label: Six Shooter
- Members: Shawn Creamer; Derek Downham; Paul Pfisterer; Jud Ruhl; Darin McConnell
- Website: sixshooterrecords.com/artists/the-beauties/

The Beauties are a Canadian alternative country band from Toronto.

== Career ==
They formed at the Dakota Tavern in 2006. The band members are Shawn Creamer, Derek Downham, Paul Pfisterer, Jud Ruhl and Darin McConnell.

The Beauties have opened for Skydiggers, Broken Social Scene, Justin Rutledge and Jason Collett, and have backed up songwriters including Ron Sexsmith, Jim Cuddy and Serena Ryder.

They signed to Six Shooter Records in 2009. That same year, Now Magazine named the Beauties as the best roots/country band in Toronto.

They recorded an EP with Serena Ryder, but so far only one song from those sessions has been released; a cover of "The Funeral" by Band of Horses.

On June 1, 2010, they released their first full length, self-titled album on Six Shooter Records.

== Discography ==
- Die Die Die EP (Independent, 2008)
- The Beauties (Independent, 2010)
