= Shead =

Shead is a surname, and may refer to:

- Artie Shead, New Zealand rugby league player
- Brian Shead (1937–2020), Australian racing driver, constructor and administrator
- Carrie Sheads, American school administrator
- DeShawn Shead (born 1988), American football cornerback
- Garry Shead, Australian artist and filmmaker; won the Archibald Prize in 1992/93 and the Dobell Prize in 2004
- Jamal Shead (born 2002), American basketball player
- James Shead (born 1965), British auto racing driver
- Phillip Shead, New Zealand and French rugby league player

== See also ==
- Shead High School, public high school in Eastport, Maine
- Shea (disambiguation)
- Sheard
- Shed
