= Nick Buzz =

Canadian band

- Origin: Toronto, Ontario, Canada
- Genres: Rock, classical
- Years active: 1995–present
- Labels: DROG, Six Shooter
- Members: Jonathan Goldsmith; Hugh Marsh; Rob Piltch; Martin Tielli

Nick Buzz is a Canadian band composed of pianist Jon Goldsmith, violinist Hugh Marsh, guitarist Rob Piltch, and singer/songwriter Martin Tielli.

== History ==
Goldsmith, Marsh, Piltch and Tielli came together in 1992 to collaborate on a cover of Joni Mitchell's "River" for the 1992 Mitchell tribute album Back to the Garden. The four began practising and performing under the name Nick Buzz, a nod to Tielli's chain-smoking habit ('nicotine buzz').

Nick Buzz released a full-length album, Circo, in 1996 through Dark Light Music. It was rereleased in 2002 by Six Shooter Records, with the music magazine Chart calling it a "virtually unheard-of 1996 classic". In 2003, they got back together to perform four songs by Arnold Schoenberg, originally for Andrew Burashko's Art of Time series in Toronto. The group released a recording of these songs for Tielli's Tielli 2003 subscription series on Six Shooter.

In 2013, Nick Buzz released the album A Quiet Evening at Home on Six Shooter Records.

== Discography ==
- Circo (1996)
- Arnold Schoenberg and the Berlin Cabaret (2003)
- A Quiet Evening at Home (2013)
