= Heal Thyself Pt. 1: Instinct =

Studio album by Steven Page
- Released: March 11, 2016
- Recorded: Doghouse of Thunder, North Vancouver, British Columbia; Fresh Baked Woods, Ontario
- Genre: Pop rock
- Length: 47:03
- Label: Ole
- Producers: Steven Page, Craig Northey

Steven Page chronology
Page One (2010)	Heal Thyself Pt. 1: Instinct (2016)	Discipline: Heal Thyself, Pt. II (2018)

Professional ratings
Review scores
Source	Rating
Allmusic	3.5/5 stars

Heal Thyself Pt. 1: Instinct is an album by Canadian musician Steven Page. Released on 11 March 2016, it is his fourth full-length release outside of Barenaked Ladies. The album includes the track "Manchild," which was originally released on the "A Different Sort of Solitude" single.

A follow-up, Discipline: Heal Thyself, Pt. II, was released on September 14, 2018.

== Track listing ==
All tracks are written by Steven Page and Craig Northey, except where noted.

No.	Title	Writer(s)	Length
1.	"There's a Melody I"	Steven Page	1:06
2.	"The Work at Hand"		3:57
3.	"Here's What It Takes"		3:41
4.	"I Can See My House From Here"		5:23
5.	"Manchild"		4:41
6.	"If That's Your Way"		3:28
7.	"Mama"		4:04
8.	"Surprise, Surprise"		4:43
9.	"Hole in the Moonlight"		3:59
10.	"Linda Ronstadt in the 70s"	Steven Page	3:52
11.	"There's a Melody II"	Steven Page	3:52
12.	"No Song Left to Save Me"		4:03
Total length:			47:03

== Personnel ==
- Steven Page - Vocals, guitar, keyboards, piano, organ, bass, flute, banjo and whistling on "Linda Ronstadt In the 70s," percussion, and drums on "No Song Left to Save Me"
- Craig Northey - Electric guitar, acoustic guitar on "There's a Melody II," background vocals, keyboards, and bass on "No Song Left to Save Me"

Additional personnel

- John Fields - Castanets on "Linda Ronstadt In the 70s"
- Bryden Baird - Flugelhorn, French horn trumpet
- Jason Baird - Saxophone, alto saxophone, clarinet, flute, bass
- Jesse Baird - Background vocals, drums and percussion, alto horn,
- Doug Elliot - Bass and whistling on "Linda Ronstadt In the 70s"
- Pat Steward - Drums and percussion, tambourine, bicycle pump, whistling on "Linda Ronstadt In the 70s"
- Isaac Page - Viola on tracks 1, 3, 4 and 11
- Jonah Page - Background vocals on "I Can See My House From Here" and "Hole In the Moonlight"
- Murray Atkinson - Electric and acoustic guitar, keyboards, and whistling on "Linda Ronstadt In the 70s"
- Kevin Fox - Cello and background vocals
- Karen Graves - Violin, background vocals, flute
- Gene Hardy - Saxophone, tenor and baritone saxophones
- Lori Nuic - Background vocals on "I Can See My House From Here"

== Production ==
- Producers: Steven Page, Craig Northey, and John Fields
- Recording: Steven Page, Paul Forgues, Vic Florencia, Craig Northey, and John Fields
- Mixing: John Fields, Paul David Hager, and Vic Florencia
- Mastering: João Carvalho
- Art Direction/Design: Paul McGrath
- Concept/design: Christine Munn
- Photography: Nikki Ormerod
- Management: Ray Danniels and Cynthia Barry
