= There and Back =

There and Back may refer to:

- There & Back (Jeff Beck album)
- There and Back (Dick Morrissey album)
- There and Back (Skydiggers album)
- There and Back – Live, an album by Chilliwack
- There & Back (TV series), reality TV series featuring Ashley Parker Angel
- There and Back, an 1891 novel by George MacDonald also published as The Baron's Apprenticeship
- "There and Back", a song by Seventh Wonder in their album Mercy Falls
- There and Back, a 1916 short film directed by Larry Semon
- There and Back, a memoir by Royal Navy officer Jeremy Black

== See also ==
- There and Back Again (disambiguation)
