= Stolen Moments (Jim Witter song) =

Single by Jim Witter

from the album Jim Witter
- Released: 1993
- Genre: Country
- Length: 3:08
- Label: FRE
- Songwriters: Jim Witter; Johnny Douglas
- Producer: Johnny Douglas

Jim Witter singles chronology
"Distant Drum" (1993)	"Stolen Moments" (1993)	"Sweet Sweet Poison" (1994)

"Stolen Moments" is a song recorded by Canadian country music artist Jim Witter. It was released in 1993 as the third single from his debut album, Jim Witter. It peaked at number 5 on the RPM Country Tracks chart in February 1994. This song makes people cherish time with children.

== Chart performance ==
Chart (1993–1994)	Peak position
Canada Country Singles (RPM)	5

=== Year-end charts ===
Chart (1994)	Position
Canada Country Tracks (RPM)	63
