= DROG =

Drog may refer to:

- Drog (anchor), a kind of anchor consisting of simply a canvas bag
- Draugr (Swedish: Drög), an undead being from Nordic mythology
- DROG Records, a Canadian record label
- Didier Drogba, Ivorian footballer
- "Drogs", nickname for supporters and fans of Drogheda United, a football club in Ireland
