= The Henrys =

- Origin: Toronto, Ontario, Canada
- Genres: Roots music, Americana (music), Folk music, Blues, Jazz
- Years active: 1994–present
- Label: Independent
- Members: Don Rooke; Davide DiRenzo; Paul Pasmore; John Sheard; Hugh Marsh; Mary Margaret O'Hara; Gregory Hoskins
- Website: www.thehenrys.ca

The Henrys is a Toronto-based, "nearly instrumental" quartet. Their music features the sound of an antique slide guitar called a kona (and other slide guitars), along with various other instruments, including pump organ, conch shell, guitars, vocals (sometimes wordless), trumpet, drums, the sonar zombie, and steel drums. The band consists of leader Don Rooke along with a large cast of Toronto musicians that includes or has included Paul Pasmore, John Sheard, Hugh Marsh, Davide DiRenzo, David Piltch, Jorn Anderson, Michael White, Joey Wright, Joe Phillips, Mike Billard, David Trevis, Monte Horton, and Jonathan Goldsmith. Vocals have been contributed, over the years, by guest vocalists such as Mary Margaret O'Hara, Becca Stevens, Gregory Hoskins, and Martina Sorbara.

Rooke, the leader and composer, has recorded and toured with Mary Margaret O'Hara, Doug Paisley, Three Metre Day (with Hugh Marsh and Michelle Willis), Golden Country Classics (with Paisley, Bazil Donovan, Mike Belitsky and Chuck Erlichman), and recorded with and James Williamson, Iggy and the Stooges, among many others.

== History ==
The Henrys came together in 1990, starting as the duo of Rooke and Pasmore. They released their first album, Puerto Angel, in 1996. The band has played concerts around the world, including the Sweetwaters Music Festival in New Zealand, the North Sea Jazz Festival in the Netherlands, South by Southwest in Austin, Texas, Toronto's Harbourfront Centre and many others. They headlined at New York City's The Bottom Line in 1998. The Henrys then scaled back on performing, but continue to record together; they produced three more albums, including Joyous Porous in 2002.

In 2009, the band released their fifth album, Is this Tomorrow. The band's recordings received critical acclaim for their originality, arrangements, and Rooke's acoustic slide guitar work.

The Henrys released their sixth album, Quiet Industry, on June 11, 2015. The singer on that record, the first Henrys recording with lyrics by Rooke (who also wrote the lyrics for the recording Coasting Notes by Three Metre Day) is Gregory Hoskins.

The seventh record, an all-instrumental album called Paydirt, was released January 20, 2020, as a vinyl LP, with a digital download option via Bandcamp. The group played a sold out release show at Toronto’s Burdock Music Hall on February 9 of that year, with DiRenzo, Sheard, Wright, Phillips, and Rooke. The concert was recorded and filmed.

Paydirt is both acoustic and electric. The acoustic half has Rooke on dobro, Joey Wright on acoustic guitar and mandocello, and Joseph Phillips on acoustic bass. It was recorded over two days in June 2018. Pump organ, by Sheard and Goldsmith, was added a few weeks later, as well as some percussion. The electric side features Davide DiRenzo on drums, John Dymond, Paul Pasmore and Joe Phillips on bass, keyboards by Sheard and Goldsmith, Hugh Marsh on violin, and lap steel and electric guitar by Rooke.

The album was reviewed favourably by the British author and journalist Richard Williams, in his blog The Blue Moment.

== Discography ==
- Puerto Angel (1994)
- Chasing Grace (1996)
- Desert Cure (1998)
- The Yearly Ears (2000) (Compilation album)
- Joyous Porous (2002)
- Is This Tomorrow (2009)
- Quiet Industry (2015)
- Paydirt (2020)
- Shrug (2022)
- Secular Hymns & Border Songs (2024)
