= Road Radio =

Studio album by Skydiggers
- Released: 1995
- Recorded: Lighthouse Theatre Port Dover, Desolation Sound Vancouver, Chemical Sound Toronto
- Genre: Roots rock
- Label: WEA / Warner Music
- Producer: Skydiggers

Skydiggers chronology
Just Over This Mountain (1993)	Road Radio (1995)	Desmond's Hip City (1997)

Professional ratings
Review scores
Source	Rating
Allmusic	4/5 stars

Road Radio is a 1995 album by Skydiggers.

== Track listing ==
1. "Maple Syrup Song" – 0:51 (Finlayson/Maize)
2. "Toss & Turn" – 2:53 (P.Cash)
3. "Alice Graham" – 3:01 (Finlayson/Maize)
4. "Drive Away" – 4:03 (P.Cash)
5. "Radio Waves" – 2:33 (Macey/Chambers/Skydiggers)
6. "What Do You See?" – 2:54 (P.Cash/A.Cash)
7. "It's a Pity" – 4:53 (Finlayson/Maize)
8. "You've Got a Lot of Nerve" – 3:37 (A.Cash)
9. "Down in the Hole" – 4:23 (Finlayson/Maize)
10. "Long Long Time" – 3:23 (Finlayson/Maize)
11. "Endless Grey Night" – 4:35 (P.Cash)
12. "Even When You Fall" – 4:05 (Finlayson/Maize)
13. "Perch Platter" – 0:40 (Skydiggers)
14. "Just Another Day" – 2:55 (P.Cash)
