= Gregory Hoskins and the Stickpeople =

- Origin: Toronto, Ontario, Canada
- Genres: Folk rock
- Years active: 1985–1996
- Label: True North
- Past members: Gregory Hoskins; Lynn Simmons; George Civello; Colleen Allen; Mike Fabello; Michael Spencer-Arscott; John McCormick; Steve Lucas; Phil Dwyer; Sarah McElcheran; Leslie Charbon

Gregory Hoskins and the Stickpeople were a Canadian folk rock band active between 1985 and 1996. They are best known for their 1991 single "Neighbourhood". The band's consistent members throughout its lifetime were singer/songwriter Gregory Hoskins, backing vocalist Lynn Simmons, keyboardist George Civello and drummer Michael Spencer-Arscott, while John McCormick, Phil Dwyer and Colleen Allen played saxophone, and Steve Lucas and Mike Fabello played bass guitar, at different times.

== History ==
Hoskins, who had been writing songs since he was 14 years old, formed the Stickpeople in the mid 1980s with saxophonist John McCormick, and in 1990 signed with True North Records and Bernie Finklestein Management.

The band released their debut album, Moon Come Up, in February 1991. They toured nationally to support the album, opening for acts such as the Indigo Girls, the Neville Brothers and Sarah McLachlan. In 1993, they released Raids on the Unspeakable. Both recordings were produced for True North Records by Jonathan Goldsmith. A total of five music videos were created and received regular rotation on MuchMusic.

In 1992 and 1994, the band performed and toured as the musical accompaniment for the Heart of Mine Tour, actor and playwright Robert Morgan's one-man stage show about Bob Dylan. They also worked with Cheryl l'Hirondelle.

In 1996, Hoskins, Simmons and Civello began recording a third record independently. Hoskins released Surgery on his own label in 1999.

== Break-up ==
Following the release of Surgery, the band parted ways. Hoskins released his first solo album, King of Good Intentions, in 2001. He followed up with The Beggar Heart in 2007, Alone in the Mayor's House in 2008, Pleasure & Relief: A Live Concert Recording in 2008, The Map of Above, The Map of Below with drummer Gary Craig in 2013, Vain+Alone in 2017, and Nights of Grief & Mystery with Stephen Jenkinson also in 2017. He has performed and recorded with the Art of Time Ensemble and The Henrys.

== Discography ==
- Moon Come Up (1991)
- Raids on the Unspeakable (1993)
- Surgery (1999)
