= Amelia Curran (musician) =

Canadian singer-songwriter

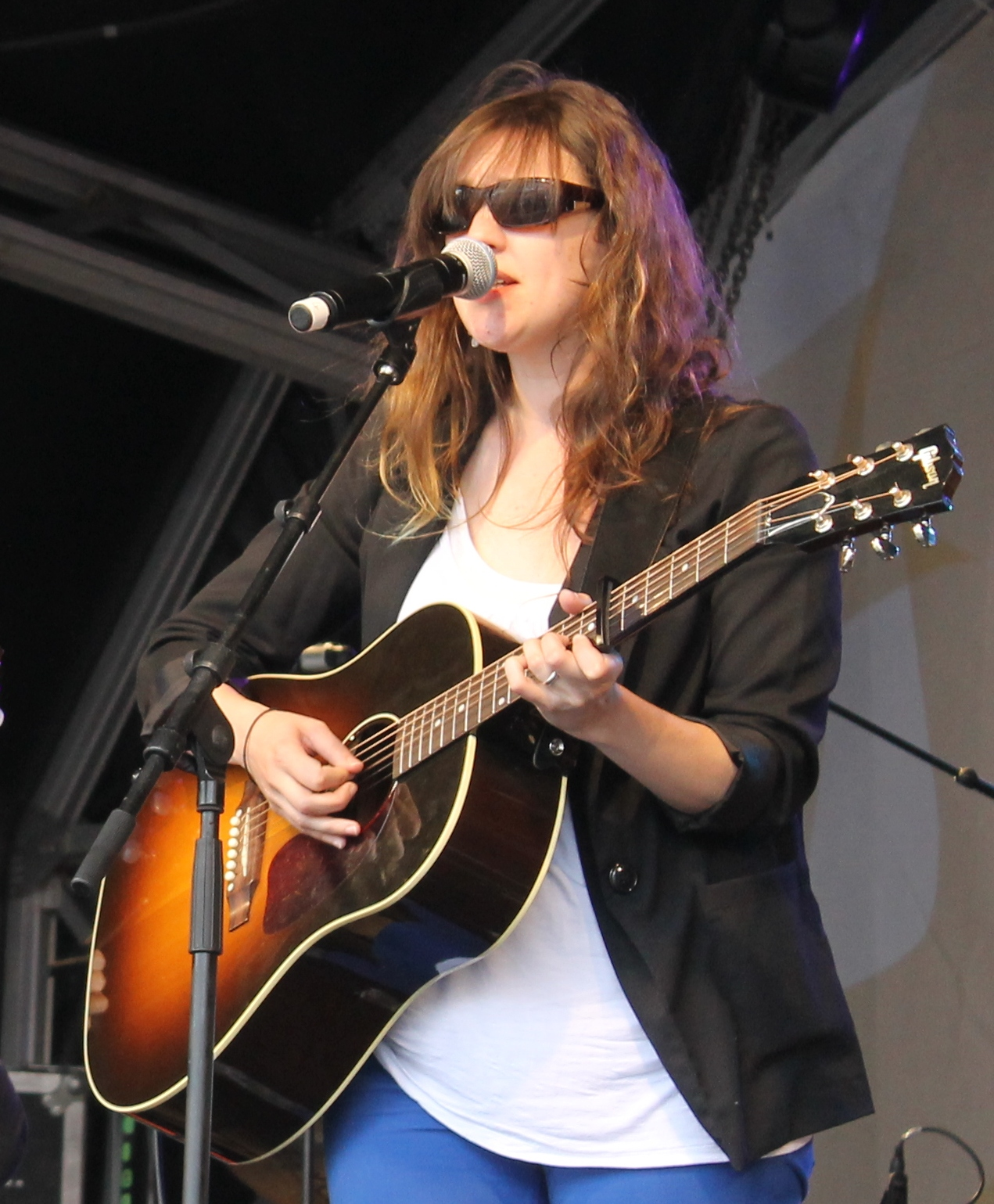
- Curran performing at Canada Day celebrations in London, 2012

Background information
- Born: St. John's, Newfoundland and Labrador, Canada
- Genres: Indie rock Folk rock Alternative country
- Occupation: Singer-songwriter
- Instrument(s): Vocals, guitar
- Years active: 2000–present
- Labels: Six Shooter
- Website: ameliacurran.com

Amelia Curran is a Canadian singer-songwriter from St. John's, Newfoundland and Labrador. The National Post describes her music as "a bit like Leonard Cohen being channeled in a dusty saloon by Patsy Cline."

== Early life ==
Curran was born in St. John's. She started playing guitar and writing songs as a teenager and eventually dropped out of university to busk on the streets of St. John's.

== Career ==
=== 2000 – 2006 ===
Curran released her first album in 2000, and since then she has released seven more. Curran's lyrics have been described as "evocative" by Spinner Canada who, referring to Curran's song "The Mistress", wrote "like the best poets, Curran packs so much meaning into each line that the listener barely has time to register each clever lyric before the next zinger comes along."

On her 2001 release, Trip Down Little Road, Curran performed as a member of the group The SenseAmelia Project, a seven-piece group, which included trumpeter Caleb Hamilton. The SenseAmelia Project was nominated for a 2003 East Coast Music Association Award in the category Rock Recording of the Year.

Her 2006 release, War Brides, was initially released independently and was later given a European and Canadian release by Six Shooter Records. War Brides was nominated for two East Coast Music Association Awards, in the categories Folk Recording of the Year and Female Solo Recording of the Year.

A song written by Curran ("The Union") was recorded by Nova Scotia-based folk-roots group Heavy Meadows, and released on their 2004 eponymous release.

=== 2009–present ===
In 2009, Curran released Hunter, Hunter. She describes this album as "a little tougher than War Brides but it's still minimal". She explains that the title is "Hunter Hunter as opposed to hunter-gatherer." This is the first album that she recorded in her hometown of St. John's.

Hunter Hunter earned Curran nominations for four 2010 East Coast Music Association Awards, in the categories Female Solo Recording of the Year, FACTOR Recording of the Year, SOCAN Songwriter of the Year, and Folk Recording of the Year. On April 17, 2010, Curran won a Juno Award in the category of Roots and Traditional Album of the Year: Solo for Hunter Hunter. In that same year Curran also won first prize (Folk category) of the 15th Annual USA Songwriting Competition, and was named solo artist of the year at the Canadian Folk Music Awards.

Curran's album, They Promised You Mercy, was released on November 8, 2014. Curran garnered nominations for four 2016 East Coast Music Association Awards for the album, and won in the category Songwriter of the Year.

In 2017, Curran released her eighth full-length album, Watershed. The album featured performances by guitarists Dean Drouillard, bassist Devon Henderson, and drummer Joshua Van Tassel (of the group Great Lake Swimmers). Curran was nominated for the 2018 JUNO Awards in the categories Contemporary Roots Album of the Year and Songwriter of the Year (for songs "Come Back for Me", "Watershed", and "Try"), and 2018 East Coast Music Association Awards in the categories Album of the Year, Solo Recording of the Year, and Folk Recording of the Year.

In addition to being a musician, Curran is also a playwright and actor, and has had her plays performed in fringe festivals.

== Advocacy ==
Curran is an outspoken advocate for improvements in mental healthcare services, including the coordination of government and community-based efforts. She has acknowledged that she has dealt with anxiety and depression herself.

In 2014, shortly before the release of They Promised You Mercy, Curran performed music for a public service video advocating awareness and service improvements on mental-health issues, which also featured the participation of figures including actors Allan Hawco and Krystin Pellerin, author Michael Crummey, and Newfoundland and Labrador MHA Gerry Rogers.

In 2015, Curran was involved in starting a nonprofit organization aimed at raising awareness of mental health issues and seeking to improve education, support and services.

== Discography ==
- Barricade (2000)
- Trip Down Little Road (2001)
- Lullabies for Barflies (2002)
- War Brides (2006)
- Hunter, Hunter (2009)
- Spectators (2012)
- They Promised You Mercy (2014)
- Watershed (2017)
- Live at Massey Hall (2019)
