= Hugh Marsh =

- Born: June 5, 1955 (age 71); Montreal, Quebec
- Origin: Toronto, Ontario
- Genres: Jazz, classical, rock
- Instrument: Violin
- Years active: 1978–present
- Website: hughmarsh.net

Hugh Marsh (born June 5, 1955) is a violinist from Toronto, known for his electric violin sound. Marsh was nominated for a 2007 Juno Award in the best contemporary jazz album category.

== Early days ==
Marsh was born in Montreal, Quebec, and brought up in Ottawa, Ontario, where he learned to play the violin from the age of five but it was when he tried playing the saxophone while at Canterbury high school that led to him exploring jazz, funk, and rhythm and blues. With his father's encouragement, he transferred these improvisation skills to the electric violin. He is the brother of musician Fergus Marsh.

== Career ==
In 1978, Marsh was invited by jazz musician Moe Koffman to perform with him in a concert series at the Art Gallery of Ontario in Toronto. This led to gigs at top Toronto jazz club George's Spaghetti House and to performances with Canadian jazz musicians Marsh had long admired such as Doug Riley, Claude Ranger, Sonny Greenwich and Don Thompson.

After meeting Bruce Cockburn in 1979, Cockburn invited Marsh to join his band for recordings and tours.

In 1984, Marsh recorded his independent album The Bear Walks which was later distributed by Duke Street Records. He was supported on the album by Doug Riley (keyboards), Peter Cardinali (bass, production), and Michael Brecker (tenor sax). The album sold well and was distributed by Verabra Records in Germany, Austria and Switzerland in 1986.

Marsh recorded a follow-up album in 1987. Shaking The Pumpkin featured Bruce Cockburn (on "How the Violin Was Born"), Dalbello (on "Rules Are Made to be Broken") and singer Robert Palmer on a version of Jimi Hendrix's "Purple Haze". Marsh's collaboration with Robert Palmer on "Purple Haze" became a radio hit in Canada and the United States.

Since 1990, Marsh has recorded and toured with Celtic singer Loreena McKennitt, contributing to six multi-platinum albums and a number of world tours. From 1998, he began working with Turkish Sufi DJ Mercan Dede, resulting in contributions to three albums and other touring projects. Marsh has also worked with Turkish artists Ihsan Ozgen, Kani Karaca, Goksel Baktagir, and Ozcan Deniz.

In 1992, Marsh, along with Jonathan Goldsmith, Martin Tielli and Rob Piltch, provided backup for a track on the album Back to the Garden; these four later formed the band Nick Buzz and produced two albums and an EP.

In 2000, Marsh performed with former Bauhaus singer Peter Murphy on his international Just For Love tour. The album Alive Just for Love was a live recording of a set from the tour's El Rey show in Los Angeles. This was followed by the studio album Dust and a subsequent North American tour.

Marsh collaborated on film scoring projects with composers Harry Gregson Williams and Don Rooke, with compositions featured on such films as Armageddon, Whatever Happened to Harold Smith, Spy Game, Sinbad: Legend of the Seven Seas, The Rundown, Veronica Guerin, Man on Fire, Shrek 2, Return to Sender, Domino, Kingdom of Heaven, The Chronicles of Narnia, Still Mine, and Seraphim Falls. He also worked with Hans Zimmer on scores for Tears of the Sun and The Da Vinci Code.

In 2004, Marsh joined clarinetist Don Byron's new quartet "Swiftboat", along with Kermit Driscoll on bass and Pheeroan Aklaff on drums. Marsh toured as part of trumpeter Jon Hassell's new quartet with bassist Peter Freeman and percussionist Steve Shehan.

Marsh is a four-time winner of the Jazz Report Award for violinist of the year and a three-time recipient of the National Jazz Award for violinist of the year.

Marsh's recording Hugmars was released in November 2006 and was nominated for a 2007 Juno Award in the best contemporary jazz album category.

Marsh also performs with the Toronto-based band 'Three Metre Day' featuring Michelle Willis on pump organ and vocals, Hugh on violin and Don Rooke on slide guitar.

Since September 2015, Marsh regularly performs with the Rheostatics.

== Discography ==
=== Singles ===
- 1984 "Versace"/"Znefu For Y'all" (Duke Street/WEA)
- 1987 "Purple Haze" (Duke Street/WEA), with Robert Palmer
- 1989 "Purple Haze" re-issue (Soundwings – US), with Robert Palmer

=== Albums ===
- 1984 The Bear Walks (Duke Street/WEA)
- 1987 Shaking The Pumpkin (Duke Street/WEA)
- 1988 Shaking The Pumpkin (Soundwings/Duke Street – US) re-issue
- 1996 Songs for my Mother and Father (Cool Papa)
- 2006 Hugmars (nominated for 2007 Juno Award, Contemporary Jazz Album of the Year)
- 2019 Violinvocations (Bandcamp)

=== Compilations/Other ===
- 1996 cut on Sweet Relief II compilation
- 1997 cut on Carols of Christmas, Vol. 2 compilation

== Contributions ==
- with Peter Murphy – "Alive Just for Love", "Dust"
- with Bruce Cockburn – "Humans", "Inner City Front", "Mummy Dust", "The Trouble With Normal", "World of Wonders", "Big Circumstance", "Waiting for a Miracle", "Christmas", "You've Never Seen Everything".
- with Don Ross – "Bearing Straight".
- with Loreena McKennitt – "The Visit", "The Book of Secrets", "A Winter Garden", "The Mask and Mirror", "Live in Paris and Toronto", "An Ancient Muse", "Nights from the Alhambra", "The Wind That Shakes the Barley", "A Mediterranean Odyssey".
- with Barenaked Ladies – "Born on a Pirate Ship"
- with Brian Hughes – "Straight to You"
- with Alannah Myles – "Arrival", "Alannah"
- with Steve Bell
- with Mary Margaret O'Hara – "Miss America, "Christmas EP"
- with Raffi – "Evergreen, Everblue"
- with Brooks Williams – "Knife Edge", "Seven Sisters"
- with Roberto Occhipinti – "Trinacria", "The Cusp"
- with The Henrys – "Joyous Porous", "Puerto Angel"
- with Mercan Dede – "Seyhatname", "Nar", "Su", "Nefes".
- with Nick Buzz – "Circo"
- with Montuno Police – "Touch", "The Call", "Nomads"
- with The MRC Trio – "Tribal Dance", "That Magic Thread"
- with Random Access – "Random Access 3, "No Soap Radio", "Accidental Beef".
- with Hans Zimmer – "Tears of the Sun", "The Da Vinci Code"
- with Harry Gregson Williams – "Armageddon", "Whatever Happened to Harold Smith?", "Spy Game", "Veronica Guerin", "The Rundown", "Shrek 2", "Return to Sender", "Kingdom of Heaven", "Man on Fire", "The Chronicles of Narnia", "Seraphim Falls", "Deja Vu", "The Number 23" and "The Taking of Pelham 123", "The Town", "Unstoppable", "Prince of Persia: The Sands of Time".
- with The Stooges- "Ready to Die"
- with Sora - "Heartwood"
- with Rheostatics - "The Great Lakes Suite"
