= One Beat at a Time =

Single by Jim Witter

from the album All My Life
- Released: 2000
- Genre: Country
- Length: 3:34
- Label: Curb
- Songwriters: Jamie O'Hara; James House
- Producer: Chuck Howard

Jim Witter singles chronology
"Tough as a Pickup Truck" (1999)	"One Beat at a Time" (2000)	"One Hundred Years" (2001)

"One Beat at a Time" is a song recorded by Canadian country music artist Jim Witter. It was released in 2000 as the fourth single from his second studio album, All My Life. It peaked at number 7 on the RPM Country Tracks chart in September 2000.

The song was also recorded by Steve Holy on his 2000 debut album, Blue Moon.

== Chart performance ==
Chart (2000)	Peak position
Canada Country Singles (RPM)	7
