= Desmond's Hip City =

Studio album by Skydiggers
- Released: 1997
- Recorded: Chemical Sound Toronto, Slack Studios Vancouver
- Genre: Roots rock
- Label: Hip City, DROG Records
- Producer: Josh Finlayson, Ron Macey, Andy Maize

Skydiggers chronology
Road Radio (1995)	Desmond's Hip City (1997)	Still Restless: The Lost Tapes (1999)

Professional ratings
Review scores
Source	Rating
Allmusic	4.5/5 stars

Desmond's Hip City is a 1997 album by Skydiggers. The album differs from the band's conventional roots rock sound somewhat, with several songs (notably "Shape of Things to Come" and "November in Ontario") adopting more of a hard rock sound and the title track incorporating electronic keyboards and Sonic Youth-style guitar feedback.

Desmond's Hip City refers to a record shop in Brixton, England; band member Josh Finlayson had lived above the store for a time in the early 1980s. Desmond's Hip City was the first Black record shop in Brixton, south of London, England. Photographs of the storefront show it named Desmond's Hip City in the early 1970s. A later view of the storefront can be seen in the 1983 Haysi Fantayzee video, "Sister Friction", where it is called Desmond Hip City.

Guest musicians on the album include Sarah Harmer, Lewis Melville, Jim Cuddy and Anne Bourne.

== Track listing ==
All tracks written by Finlayson/Maize unless otherwise noted.

1. "Desmond's Hip City" – 3:51
2. "Only a Fool" – 3:09
3. "Jade Hops" – 3:57
4. "Truth About Us" – 5:17 (Garbe)
5. "Shape of Things to Come" – 3:30
6. "November in Ontario" – 5:08
7. "Dear Henry" – 4:04
8. "This New Country" – 3:30
9. "The Gift" – 4:15
10. "2,000 Years" – 3:43
