= All My Life (Jim Witter song) =

Single by Jim Witter

from the album All My Life
- Released: 1999
- Genre: Country
- Length: 3:36
- Label: Curb
- Songwriters: Jim Witter; Steve Wariner
- Producer: Chuck Howard

Jim Witter singles chronology
"Chevy Coupe" (1994)	"All My Life" (1999)	"Jumpin' Right In" (1999)

"All My Life" is a song recorded by Canadian country music artist Jim Witter. It was released in 1999, as the first single from his second studio album, All My Life. It peaked at number 8 on the RPM Country Tracks chart in April 1999.

== Chart performance ==
Chart (1999)	Peak position
Canada Country Singles (RPM)	8

=== Year-end charts ===
Chart (1999)	Position
Canada Country Tracks (RPM)	30
