= A Singer Must Die =

Studio album by Art of Time Ensemble featuring Steven Page
- Released: February 16, 2010
- Recorded: 2007–2009
- Genre: Orchestral pop
- Length: 50:40
- Label: Pheromone Recordings
- Producer: Jonathan Goldsmith

Art of Time Ensemble featuring Steven Page chronology
The Vanity Project (2005)	A Singer Must Die (2010)	Page One (2010)

A Singer Must Die is a collaboration between the Canadian music organization Art of Time Ensemble and vocalist Steven Page. It is Page's first release following his departure from Barenaked Ladies, although it was recorded before he left the band and originally conceived as a side project, and his first solo album since 2005's The Vanity Project. It contains ten tracks, all of which are cover versions. Page performed all of the songs on the album live with the Art of Time Ensemble on June 20 and 21, 2008 at the Enwave Theatre in Toronto. The concert was broadcast on CBC radio the following month. Originally, the live concert was not intended to result in an album, but because of the success of the concert, they decided to go into the studio to record the songs.

The album was put on Page's website for preorder about a month before its release. A certain number of preordered copies were autographed by Page, as well as Andrew Burashko, who is the pianist in the Art of Time Ensemble.

== Track listing ==
(Original artists in parentheses)

No.	Title	Writer(s)	Arranger	Length
1.	"Lion's Teeth" (The Mountain Goats)	John Darnielle	Jim McGrath	3:57
2.	"I Want You"	Elvis Costello	Robert Carli	8:11
3.	"Foolish Love"	Rufus Wainwright	Jim McGrath	4:53
4.	"Running Out of Ink" (Barenaked Ladies)	Steven Page & Ed Robertson	Cameron Wilson	4:11
5.	"A Singer Must Die"	Leonard Cohen	Gavin Bryars	4:20
6.	"The Taxi Ride"	Jane Siberry	Glenn Buhr	7:42
7.	"Tonight We Fly" (The Divine Comedy)	Neil Hannon	Kevin Fox	3:27
8.	"Virtute the Cat Explains Her Departure" (The Weakerthans)	Stephen Carroll, John Samson, Greg Smith & Jason Tait	Finn Manniche	4:00
9.	"For We Are the King of the Boudoir" (The Magnetic Fields)	Stephin Merritt	Cameron Wilson	2:37
10.	"Paranoid Android" (Radiohead)	Colin Greenwood, Ed O'Brien, Philip Selway & Thom Yorke	Robert Carli	7:27
Total length:				50:40

== Personnel ==
- Steven Page - Vocals, guitar on I Want You
- Andrew Burashko - Piano
- Robert Carli - Saxophone & Clarinet
- Margaret Jordan-Gay - Cello
- Elissa Lee - Violin
- Joseph Phillips - Bass
- Rob Piltch - Guitars

== Production ==
- Producer: Jonathan Goldsmith
- Engineering: Walter Sobczak
- Mixing: Paul Forgues
- Mastering: Peter J. Moore
- Recorded at Puck's Farm.
- Mixed at Fresh Baked Woods
