= Just Over This Mountain =

Studio album by Skydiggers
- Released: 1993
- Recorded: April–June 1993 Phase One Recording Studios Toronto, Grant Avenue Studio Hamilton
- Genre: Roots rock
- Label: fre, EMI
- Producer: Skydiggers

Skydiggers chronology
Restless (1992)	Just Over This Mountain (1993)	Road Radio (1995)

Just Over This Mountain is a 1993 album by Skydiggers. The album is noted for its laid-back style and harmony singing.

== Track listing ==
1. "Pull Me Down" – 4:20 (Anderson/Cash/Finlayson/Macey/Maize/Stokes)
2. "I'm Wondering" – 4:36 (Cash)
3. "Just Over This Mountain" – 3:31 (Finlayson/Maize)
4. "She Comes Into the Room" – 4:28 (Cash)
5. "I Thought I Knew You" – 3:40 (Finlayson/Maize)
6. "Darkness and Doubt" – 4:53 (Cash)
7. "This is No Time" – 3:36 (Cash/Finlayson/Macey/Maize/Melville/Stokes)
8. "Joanne" – 2:33 (Finlayson/Maize)
9. "You Got That Look in Your Eye" – 4:02 (Cash)
10. "Shimmy Up Those Words" – 2:48 (Finlayson/Maize)
11. "80 Odd Hours" – 3:08 (Cash)
12. "Ramblin' On" – 3:55 (Cash)
