= Tough as a Pickup Truck =

Single by Jim Witter

from the album All My Life
- Released: 1999
- Genre: Country
- Length: 3:06
- Label: Curb
- Songwriters: Jim Witter; David Martin
- Producer: Chuck Howard

Jim Witter singles chronology
"Jumpin' Right In" (1999)	"Tough as a Pickup Truck" (1999)	"One Beat at a Time" (2000)

"Tough as a Pickup Truck" is a song recorded by Canadian country music artist Jim Witter. It was released in 1999 as the third single from his second studio album, All My Life. It peaked at number 7 on the RPM Country Tracks chart in January 2000.

== Chart performance ==
Chart (1999–2000)	Peak position
Canada Country Singles (RPM)	7
