= There and Back (Skydiggers album) =

Live album by Skydiggers
- Released: August 2000
- Venue: Horseshoe Tavern, Toronto; Sidetrack Cafe, Edmonton; West Lodge Studio, Toronto
- Genre: Roots rock
- Label: Hip City; Outside Music
- Producer: Andy Maize

Skydiggers chronology
Still Restless: The Lost Tapes (1999)	There and Back (2000)	Bittersweet Harmony (2003)

Professional ratings
Review scores
Source	Rating
Allmusic	3/5 stars

There and Back is a 2000 live album by Skydiggers.

Most tracks were recorded at Toronto's Horseshoe Tavern on December 18, 1999. Tracks 2, 5 and 7 were recorded at the Sidetrack Café in Edmonton in 1998.

The final track, "Will You Ride Wide Open", is a new studio song. Additionally, the songs "Biloxi" (originally written and recorded by Jesse Winchester) and "Those Memories", although recorded live, have never appeared on a previous Skydiggers album.

== Track listing ==
1. "Slow Burnin' Fire" – 5:16 (J.Buckingham)
2. "Just Over This Mountain" – 5:25 (Finlayson/Maize)
3. "Feel You Closer" – 2:12 (P.Cash)
4. "Alice Graham" – 3:55 (Finlayson/Maize)
5. "Radio Waves" – 3:16 (P.Cash/Chambers/Finlayson/Macey/Maize/von Athen)
6. "Dear Henry" – 4:22 (Finlayson/Maize)
7. "I Will Give You Everything" – 4:34 (Finlayson/Maize)
8. "Swamp Boogie" – 3:24 (P.Cash)
9. "Truth About Us" – 5:55 (S.Garbe)
10. "You've Got That Look In Your Eye" – 3:41 (P.Cash)
11. "Just Before the Rain" – 3:02 (P.Cash)
12. "Monday Morning" – 6:11 (P.Cash/Finlayson/Macey/Maize/Stokes)
13. "A Penny More" – 7:22 (Finlayson/Maize)
14. "Biloxi" – 4:53 (J.Winchester)
15. "Those Memories" – 0:37 (Traditional)
16. "Will You Ride Wide Open" – 3:30 (Tariq/Maize)
