= Art of Time Ensemble =

Canadian musical ensemble

Art of Time Ensemble is a Toronto-based musical collective of leading Canadian musicians from the worlds of jazz and classical music.

Composed of classical, jazz and pop musicians, Art of Time Ensemble is known for exploring the intersection of classical music with other genres and the convergence of music with theatre, dance, literature and film.

Popular Art of Time programs include presentations of contemporary songs by Joni Mitchell, Paul Simon, Tom Waits, Nick Cave, Radiohead, Leonard Cohen and others reinvented by Canadian and British composers.

== History ==
Formed in 1998 by Andrew Burashko, Art of Time has become an integral part of Toronto's cultural scene, attracting some of Canada's top artists from a range of disciplines including the performing arts, film and literature, and noteworthy international musicians such as Branford Marsalis, Madeleine Peyroux and Gavin Bryars. Andrew Burashko's original idea behind the Art of Time Ensemble was to provide a way into classical music for new audiences.

From 1999 to 2019, the ensemble presented an annual concert subscription series in Toronto. The Coda Season, announced in May 2023 and spanning 18 months, was announced to be the company's 25th and final season; Burashko plans to wind down the organization in 2025. The season includes three live concerts at Harbourfront Centre, a co-production with Against the Grain Theatre, a short animated film and digital archive.

== Collaborations ==
The Ensemble has worked on many notable collaborations with artists in their respective disciplines including writers Margaret Atwood and Michael Ondaatje; singers Barbara Hannigan, Sarah Slean, Torquil Campbell and Madeleine Peyroux; actors Brent Carver and Martha Burns; dancers Peggy Baker and Evelyn Hart; and filmmakers Peter Mettler and Bruce MacDonald.

Over the years, the core artists of Art of Time Ensemble have, among many others, included:

- Composer Jonathan Goldsmith
- Concertmaster of the Metropolitan Opera Orchestra, Benjamin Bowman
- Principal cellist of the National Arts Orchestra, Rachel Mercer
- Concertmaster of Esprit Orchestra, Stephen Sitarski
- Soloist and former principal violist of the Royal Concertgebouw Orchestra and Toronto Symphony, Steven Dann
- Soloist and cellist of the Duke Trio, Thomas Wiebe
- Composer and jazz saxophonist, Phil Dwyer
- Guitarist Rob Piltch

== Recordings ==
As of 2022, Art of Time Ensemble has released eight commercial albums on the Pheromone and Art of Time Recordings labels.

Their 2009 album Black Flowers featured singer-songwriter Sarah Slean. In 2010 they released the album A Singer Must Die, a collection of cover versions in collaboration with singer and composer Steven Page.

In 2022, Art of Time Ensemble released the album Songs of Leonard Cohen Live, a collection of live recordings from their 2018 A Singer Must Die concert series presented at Harbourfront Centre in Toronto, Canada. Vocalists on the album include Sarah Slean, Sarah Harmer, Steven Page, Tom Wilson and Gregory Hoskins.

== Discography ==
- Live in Toronto (Art of Time Ensemble album), 2005
- Black Flowers, 2009
- A Singer Must Die, 2010
- Sgt. Pepper, 2013
- All That Jazz??, 2015
- Ain't Got Long, 2020
- Christmas in Prison, 2021
- Songs of Leonard Cohen Live, 2022
