= All My Life (Jim Witter album) =

Studio album by Jim Witter
- Released: October 11, 1999
- Genre: Country
- Length: 33:22
- Label: Curb
- Producer: Chuck Howard

Jim Witter chronology
Jim Witter (1993)	All My Life (1999)	Forgiveness (2003)

All My Life is the second studio album by Canadian country music artist Jim Witter. It was released in 1999 by Curb Records. It includes the Top 10 singles "All My Life", "Jumpin' Right In", "Tough as a Pickup Truck" and "One Beat at a Time" and a cover of Cheap Trick's "I Want You to Want Me".

== Track listing ==
No.	Title	Length
1.	"Jumpin' Right In"	3:48
2.	"Something 'Bout a Fire"	3:31
3.	"One Beat at a Time"	3:34
4.	"All My Life"	3:36
5.	"Tough as a Pickup Truck"	3:06
6.	"One Hundred Years"	3:32
7.	"If She Were You"	3:39
8.	"I Want You to Want Me"	2:57
9.	"Be Like Noah"	2:57
10.	"Hands of Time"	2:42
Total length:		33:22
