= Excelsior (Steven Page album) =

Studio album by Steven Page
- Released: 30 September 2022
- Recorded: Fresh Baked Woods, Ontario, Canada
- Genres: Pop rock Indie pop
- Length: 47:19
- Label: Warner Music Canada
- Producer: Steven Page

Steven Page chronology
| Discipline: Heal Thyself, Pt. II (2018) | Excelsior (2022) |

Excelsior is an album by Canadian musician Steven Page, released on 30 September 2022. It is Page's sixth solo release, and fifth since departing Barenaked Ladies and is a follow-up to the 2018 release, Discipline: Heal Thyself, Pt. II. Most of the album was recorded during the COVID-19 lockdown.

== Track listing ==
All tracks are written by Steven Page

| No. | Title | Length |
|---|---|---|
| 1. | "Feel" | 3:56 |
| 2. | "What'll I Do Now" | 4:27 |
| 3. | "Human Doll" | 3:20 |
| 4. | "How Much is Enough" | 5:01 |
| 5. | "Look to the Stars" | 4:44 |
| 6. | "Infinitely Light Years" | 6:41 |
| 7. | "Safe" | 4:14 |
| 8. | "The Golden Age of Doubling Down" | 3:41 |
| 9. | "Xylorimba" | 3:51 |
| 10. | "Zoom" | 2:59 |
| 11. | "Something About Me" | 4:25 |
| Total length: | | 47:19 |
