= There and Back Again (disambiguation) =

There and Back Again is the subtitle to The Hobbit, a 1937 novel by J. R. R. Tolkien.

There and Back Again may also refer to:

== Music ==
- There and Back Again (Vertical Horizon album), 1992
- There and Back Again (Phil Lesh album), 2002
- "There and Back Again", a song by Twilight Force from the album Heroes of Mighty Magic
- "There and Back Again", a song by Daughtry from the album Daughtry, and the title of their 2026 re-recorded compilation album

== Other uses ==
- The Hobbit: The Battle of the Five Armies or The Hobbit: There and Back Again, a 2014 film
- There and Back Again, A Hobbit's Holiday, a part of the fictional manuscript Red Book of Westmarch
- There and Back Again (novel), a 1999 novel by Pat Murphy, retelling The Hobbit as space opera
- There and Back Again: A Memoir, a memoir by actor Sean Astin, who starred in the Lord of the Rings film trilogy
- There and Back Again: A Map of Bilbo's Journey Through Eriador and Rhovanion, by Pauline Baynes.

== See also ==
- "To Where and Back Again", a 2016 episode of My Little Pony: Friendship Is Magic
- There and Back (disambiguation)
