= Shauna Thomas =

Canadian women in business

Shauna Thomas (born August 9, 1966), known as Shauna de Cartier, is Six Shooter Records’ founder and president, a Toronto-based indie label that provides artist management, production and sales of music, festival production, concert promotion and song publishing.

She is recognized for her artist-centric business model, committed to boundary-pushing artistic development with career artists.

De Cartier holds an MBA from the University of Alberta. Not being a musician herself, de Cartier looked to Bernie Finkelstein, founder of Truth North Records and one of the original advocates of Canadian-content radio regulations, for informal mentorship when growing the label. “I volunteered to work on every committee he was on and I sat beside him at the (CIMA) meetings.” Following his lead, de Cartier works in many aspects of the music business and actively participates in association work affecting change in the industry.

De Cartier is the 2015–2016 chair of the Canadian Independent Music Association (CIMA), was vice-chair of the Radio Starmaker Fund (2012) (both based in Toronto); and was on the board of the Americana Music Association in Nashville in 2013.
