= Back to the Garden =

Compilation album by Various Artists
- Released: November 1992
- Genres: folk, folk rock
- Length: 71:48
- Label: Intrepid Records

Back to the Garden is a tribute album to Joni Mitchell, released in 1992. It was released on Intrepid Records, after the Canadian chart success of their 1991 Bruce Cockburn tribute, Kick at the Darkness.

The album's first single was Sloan's rendition of "A Case of You", from Mitchell's 1971 album Blue. It was followed up by Squiddly's rap-infused rendition of "Blonde in the Bleachers".

== Track listing ==
1. "Free Man in Paris" – Big Faith
2. "This Flight Tonight" – Sara Craig
3. "Carey" – Universal Honey
4. "Big Yellow Taxi" – Lorraine Scott
5. "Black Crow" – Molly Johnson
6. "The Beat of Black Wings" – Andy Stochansky
7. "Shades of Scarlett Conquering" – Martha and the Muffins
8. "The Hissing of Summer Lawns" – Funky Bummer^{1}
9. "River" – Hugh Marsh, Jon Goldsmith, Rob Piltch and Martin Tielli ^{2}
10. "You Turn Me On, I'm a Radio" – Kurt Swinghammer
11. "Coyote" – Spirit of the West
12. "Woodstock" – W.O.W.
13. "Night in the City" – Jenny Whiteley
14. "A Case of You" – Sloan
15. "Blonde in the Bleachers" – Squiddly with Maria Del Mar^{1}
16. "Songs to Aging Children Come" – John Cody and Marti Jones
17. "Refuge of the Roads" – Laura Hubert and Art Bergmann

== Critical response ==
Chris Dafoe of The Globe and Mail singled out the album's interpretations of "River" and "Coyote" as interesting, but concluded that "this, like Intrepid's earlier Bruce Cockburn tribute, suffers from a surfeit of politeness. Those receiving the tribute are too respectable (so far it's been articulate, sensitive, critically-acclaimed folkies) and those giving the tribute are too respectful (there's nothing here, not even Sloan's punky A Case of You, that successfully hijacks a song and drags it into new territory the way Nazareth did in the '70s with their hard rock version of This Flight Tonight.)"

Neil Randall of the Waterloo Region Record wrote that the album's covers of lesser-known Mitchell songs, including "Black Crow", "The Beat of Black Wings", "Coyote", "Songs to Aging Children Come" and "Refuge of the Roads", stood out much more than the versions of her biggest hits. He concluded that "This is a very worthwhile collection, much better than the Cockburn tribute. The reason, which becomes obvious on first listening, is that Joni Mitchell is a much more varied and talented songwriter than Cockburn. I must admit that I didn't originally like the tribute idea, but Kick at the Darkness partially convinced me and this one fully does. Who's next? Gordon Lightfoot? Robbie Robertson? Neil Young? Paul Anka? Please tell me Guy Lombardo didn't write songs."

== Notes ==
^{1} Squiddly and (Hallelujah) Funky Bummer were both Toronto-based underground dance music bands who had been featured on Intrepid's Here Come the Sound Pirates compilation earlier the same year, but otherwise were virtually unknown outside of this compilation album.

^{2} These four musicians subsequently formed the group Nick Buzz in 1994, but were credited as individuals on this album.
