= Skye Wallace =

Canadian singer-songwriter

- Genres: Singer-songwriter
- Years active: 2013–present
- Website: https://www.skyewallace.com

Skye Wallace is a Canadian singer-songwriter currently based in Toronto, Ontario. Wallace has released five studio albums: This Is How We Go (2013), Living Parts (2014), Something Wicked (2016), Skye Wallace (2019), and "Terribly Good" (2022).

== Discography ==
=== Studio albums ===
- This Is How We Go (2013)
- Living Parts (2014)
- Something Wicked (2016)
- Skye Wallace (2019)
- Terribly Good (2022)

=== Singles ===
- "Blood Moon" / "Mean Song 2" (2016)
- "Scarlet Fever" (2017)
- "There is a Wall" (2019)
- "Coal in Your Window" (2019)
