= Jumpin' Right In =

Single by Jim Witter

from the album All My Life
- Released: 1999
- Genre: Country
- Length: 3:48
- Label: Curb
- Songwriters: Jim Witter; Rory Bourke
- Producer: Chuck Howard

Jim Witter singles chronology
"All My Life" (1999)	"Jumpin' Right In" (1999)	"Tough as a Pickup Truck" (1999)

"Jumpin' Right In" is a song recorded by Canadian country music artist Jim Witter. It was released in 1999 as the second single from his second studio album, All My Life. It peaked at number 10 on the RPM Country Tracks chart in September 1999.

== Chart performance ==
Chart (1999)	Peak position
Canada Country Singles (RPM)	10

=== Year-end charts ===
Chart (1999)	Position
Canada Country Tracks (RPM)	80
