= The Vanity Project =

2005 studio album by the Vanity Project

Studio album by The Vanity Project
- Released: June 21, 2005
- Recorded: 1999–2004
- Genre: Pop
- Length: 46:19
- Label: Flagship Recordings
- Producers: Steven Page, Stephen Duffy

The Vanity Project chronology
The Vanity Project (2005)	A Singer Must Die (2010)

The Vanity Project is an album released as a side project by Steven Page, then of the band Barenaked Ladies (BNL). It is also the artist name under which the album was released. Its first two singles, "That's All, That's All" (in the US) and "Wilted Rose" (in Canada), were released in early May 2005; only the latter song had a music video, which was animated.

The album features songs written mostly with longtime collaborator Stephen Duffy (one track—"So. Cal"—was written solo). Some of the songs are older holdovers ("That's All, That's All" was a song cut from the 2000 BNL album Maroon). Other songs were written later specifically for the project. The album was released on June 21, 2005.

The lead vocals on the album were all provided by Page. Page also provided much of the album's instrumentation both through playing of instruments, and through programming computer-generated instruments. Duffy also played instruments on the record, as did several other guest performers.

== History ==
Steven Page began collaborating with songwriter Stephen Duffy in the early 1990s, and their first co-written tracks appeared on the Barenaked Ladies' second release, Maybe You Should Drive. The two co-wrote a number of songs over the years, including several on each of the band's next two albums. On their fifth album Maroon, only one Duffy co-write was included (at least two others were cut). Starting with the following album, the band decided that it would be best to keep the writing duties amongst the band members. Page started The Vanity Project to allow himself to write with other writers outside of Barenaked Ladies, as well as to express some writing ideas that did not work within the band.

Page continued writing with Duffy and directed those songs, as well as song unused prior songs to his solo effort. The project's name resulted from a tape made for the project which was jokingly labeled "Vanity Project". The title was subsequently adopted seriously for the project. Page indicated, at the time of its release, a potential for subsequent albums in collaboration with other writers and artists, but as of his 2009 departure from Barenaked Ladies, there had been no indication of any work on a follow-up.

== Live performance ==
Following its release, Page toured on his own in support of the album, performing the songs acoustically on guitar, mainly in music and book stores around the United States. He played both songs from The Vanity Project, and Barenaked Ladies songs. Since these promotional shows, there has been no subsequent reference by Page to his solo act as The Vanity Project, though he has played songs from the album at these shows.

In January 2007, Page put together a band for the Barenaked Ladies Ships and Dip Cruise to perform a concert of The Vanity Project music with him. The Vanity Projects, as he dubbed them, performed two shows in the Firebird Lounge of the Carnival Legend. The band included Steven Page (vocals, guitar), Jay Coyle (drums, vocals), Chandler Coyle (Bass) and Allan Fogul (guitar, vocals). The band performed with Page on each of the Ladies' subsequent cruises: in January 2008, two shows in the Carnival Victory's Adriatic Lounge on Ships and Dip III (with Craig Northey (guitar, vocals) and Murray Atkinson (guitar, vocals, keyboards) from the New Odds in place of Fogul); and in January 2009, one show on Ships and Dip V in the Spinnaker Lounge on the Norwegian Jewel (with Doug Elliot (bass), also of the Odds, in place of Chandler Coyle).

== Track listing ==
All tracks are written by Stephen Duffy and Steven Page, except where noted.

No.	Title	Writer(s)	Length
1.	"Hit and Run"		4:11
2.	"Wilted Rose"		4:41
3.	"These Wasted Words"		4:11
4.	"So. Cal"	Steven Page	3:16
5.	"That's All, That's All"		3:42
6.	"Everything's the Same"		5:56
7.	"Glitterbug"		2:38
8.	"Thank You for Sharing"		4:43
9.	"Baby Loves the Radio"		2:55
10.	"By the Roadside"		3:57
11.	"So Young, So Wrong, So Long"		3:18
12.	"Here, Today and Yesterday"		2:57
Total length:			46:19

Track 5, "That's All, That's All," was originally recorded with Barenaked Ladies in 2000 for Maroon.

== Personnel ==
- Steven Page – Lead and backing vocals, acoustic and electric guitars, harmonica, piano, keyboards, programming
- Stephen Duffy – Acoustic and electric guitars, bass guitar, drums, backing vocals

Additional personnel

- Kevin Hearn – Keyboards on 7
- Matthew Page – Drums on 2, 6, and 11
- Joan McGuiness – Vocals on 9
- Carolyn Ricketts – Vocals on 9

Production

- Producers: Steven Page, Stephen Duffy
- Recording: Steven Page, Paul Forgues
- Additional Recording: Eric Pavlyak
- Digital Editing: Paul Forgues
- Mixing: Adam Kasper
- Mix Assistance: Justin Armstrong
- Mastering: Bob Ludwig
- Package Design: Concrete Design Communications, Inc.
- Illustrations: Leah Hayes
- Management: Pierre Tremblay

== Singles ==
Single information
"Wilted Rose"
- Released:2005
- Formats: CD
