= Forgiveness (album) =

Studio album by Jim Witter
- Released: January 14, 2003
- Genre: Contemporary Christian
- Length: 44:34
- Label: Curb
- Producer: Jim Witter

Jim Witter chronology
All My Life (1999)	Forgiveness (2003)

Forgiveness is the third studio album by Canadian country music artist Jim Witter. It was released on January 14, 2003, by Curb Records. The album was nominated for a GMA Dove Award for Inspirational Album of the Year in 2004. It was also nominated at the Juno Awards of 2004 for Contemporary Christian/Gospel Album of the Year.

== Track listing ==
No.	Title	Writer(s)	Length
1.	"More"	Dave Martin, Jim Witter	3:48
2.	"If He Puts His Hammer Down"	Steve Wariner, Witter	4:30
3.	"Ordinary Man"	Witter	3:26
4.	"Forgiveness"	Bobby Tomberlin, Witter	4:36
5.	"Faith, Hope and Love" (featuring Nichole Nordeman)	Lisa Brokop, Kim Patton-Johnston	4:39
6.	"Turn! Turn! Turn! (To Everything There Is a Season)"	Pete Seeger	3:09
7.	"Stone's Throw Away"	Rick Carnes, Wariner	3:08
8.	"Like You Do"	Witter	3:51
9.	"Be Like Noah"	Kim Tribble, Kenny West	3:18
10.	"You Are the Son"	Wariner, Witter	4:01
11.	"On the Wings of a Dove"	Bob Ferguson	3:40
12.	"Turn! Turn! Turn! (To Everything There Is a Season)" (featuring Roslyn Witter)	Seeger	2:28
Total length:			44:34
