= Discipline: Heal Thyself, Pt. II =

Studio album by Steven Page
- Released: 14 September 2018
- Recorded: Doghouse of Thunder, North Vancouver, British Columbia; Fresh Baked Woods, Ontario
- Genre: Pop rock
- Length: 43:03
- Label: Warner Music Canada
- Producers: Steven Page, Craig Northey

Steven Page chronology
Heal Thyself Pt. 1: Instinct (2016)	Discipline: Heal Thyself, Pt. II (2018)	Excelsior (2022)

Professional ratings
Review scores
Source	Rating
Backseat Mafia	7.5/10 stars
The Spill Magazine	4.5/5 stars
Sputnikmusic	4/5 stars

Discipline: Heal Thyself, Pt. II is an album by Canadian musician Steven Page, released on 14 September 2018. It is Page's fifth full-length release outside of Barenaked Ladies and is a follow-up to the 2016 release, Heal Thyself Pt. 1: Instinct. The video for the song "White Noise," an explicit and political commentary on the Unite the Right rally that occurred in Charlottesville, Virginia on 11–12 August 2017, premiered on 2 August 2018.

== Track listing ==
All tracks are written by Steven Page except where noted

No.	Title	Writer(s)	Length
1.	"Nothing Special"		4:17
2.	"Feelgood Summer"		3:04
3.	"Where Do You Stand?"		5:05
4.	"What I Got From You"		3:29
5.	"Gravity"		3:58
6.	"White Noise"		3:08
7.	"Shooting Star"		3:42
8.	"You Fucked Yourself"	Steven Page; Craig Northey	1:17
9.	"Done"		4:10
10.	"A Failure"		3:30
11.	"Whistling Through the Dark"	Steven Page; Craig Northey	2:42
12.	"Looking For the Light"	Steven Page; Craig Northey	4:41
Total length:			43:03
