= Skydiggers =

Canadian rock band

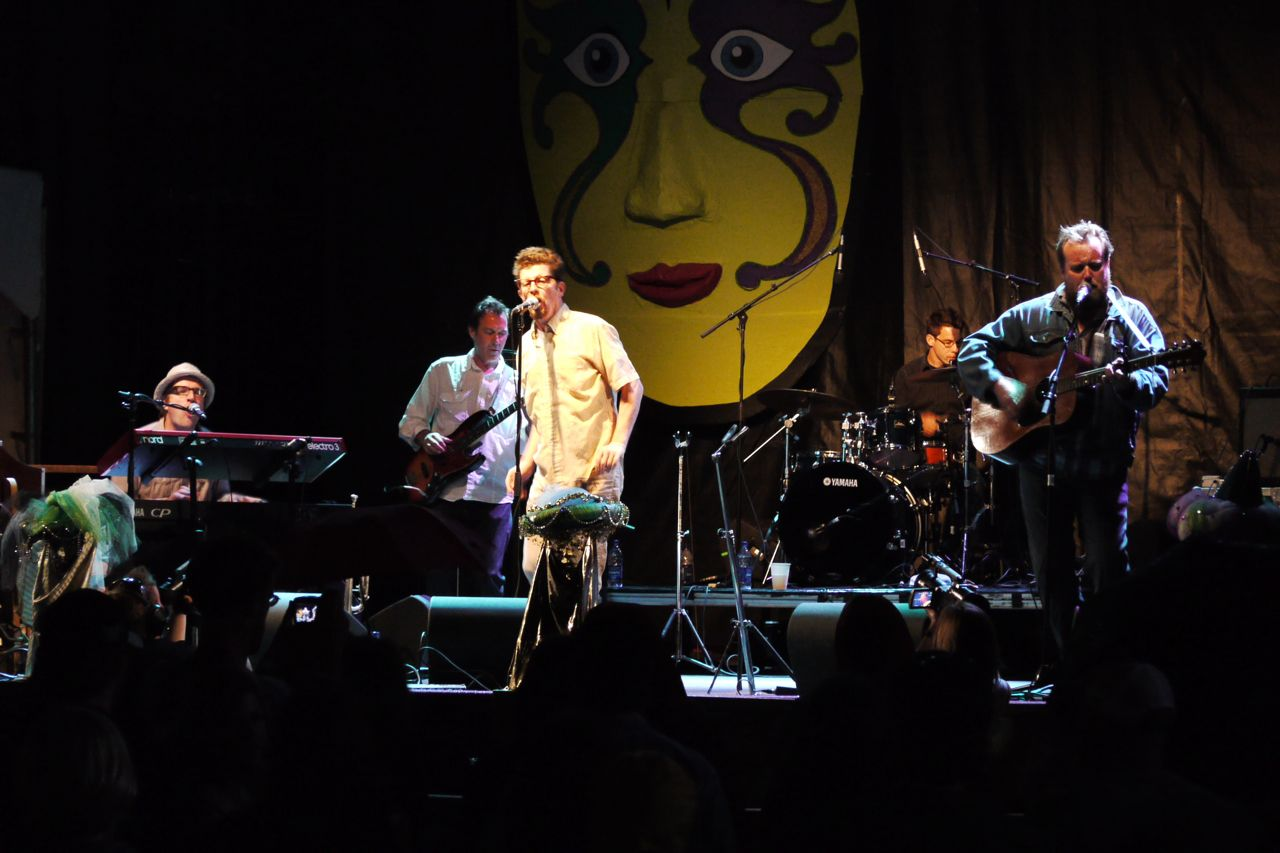
- Skydiggers, July 2009

Background information
- Origin: Toronto, Ontario, Canada
- Genres: Roots rock
- Years active: 1987–present
- Labels: Enigma, FRE, DROG, Latent Recordings
- Members: Andy Maize; Josh Finlayson; Ron Macey; Michael Johnston; Noel Webb; Jessy Bell Smith
- Past members: Wayne Stokes; Andrew Cash; Mike Sloski; Stephen Pitken; Joel Anderson; Peter Cash; Peter von Althen; Paul MacLeod
- Website: skydiggers.com

Skydiggers is a Canadian roots rock band from Toronto formed by Andy Maize and Josh Finlayson. Since 1990, they have released 19 albums/EPs and have had a number of singles that have appeared on the Canadian charts. Their most successful album is Restless, released in 1992. With a presence spanning decades, the band has appeared under a variety of different record labels and with many changes in members that form the group.

== Biography ==
The band was originally formed by singer Andy Maize, previously of Direktive 17, and lead guitarist Josh Finlayson, formerly of The Ramblers, as a duo called West Montrose. The band later added rhythm guitarist and singer-songwriter Peter Cash, drummer Wayne Stokes and bassist Ron Macey to their lineup after becoming regular performers at Acoustic Meltdown, a weekly concert series at Toronto's Spadina Hotel organized by Cash's brother, singer-songwriter Andrew Cash. The expanded line up settled on the name Skydiggers, a name which Andrew Cash had previously considered for his own band.

In 1989, the band became the first Canadian signing to Enigma Records, who released their self-titled debut album the following year. It spawned the singles "Monday Morning" and "I Will Give You Everything". However, the label soon went bankrupt, and the album was never properly promoted.

Some of Enigma's Canadian staff created FRE Records in 1992, and released the band's second (and most popular) album, Restless, that year. At the same time, Stokes left the band. Drummers Mike Sloski and Steve Pitkin filled in on drums until the band recruited Joel Anderson as its new permanent drummer. "A Penny More", the lead single from Restless, became the band's biggest hit, produced by John Oliveira and the band at Hamilton's Grant Avenue Studios.

Capitol Records, the distributor for both Enigma and FRE, also rereleased the band's debut album that year.

In 1993, the band's third album, Just Over This Mountain, was released. It consolidated the band's status by winning a number of music awards, including the Juno Award for Most Promising Group. Following that album, Anderson left the band and was replaced by Peter von Althen.

In 1995, the band signed to Warner Canada and released Road Radio. However, at this time, FRE went bankrupt, meaning that the band's earlier albums were no longer widely available. After the tour to support that album, Cash left the band. He was replaced by Paul MacLeod. The band subsequently left Warner, after which von Althen also left the band.

Since the band's sound had largely been defined by Maize and Cash's vocal harmonies, the band revised their sound somewhat for 1997's Desmond's Hip City, released on DROG Records. The title track had an almost trip hop feel, and some other songs (notably "November in Ontario" and "The Shape of Things to Come") were closer to hard rock than anything the band had previously recorded.

In 1999, the band performed at the 1999 Stardust Picnic festival at Historic Fort York, Toronto. With Restless, their most popular album, still unavailable in stores due to legal uncertainties around FRE's bankruptcy, they decided that their next studio project would be to assemble a new version of that album using old rehearsal recordings. Still Restless: The Lost Tapes was released that year.

In 2000, the band released the live album There and Back Again, followed in 2003 by Bittersweet Harmony.

In 2006, they teamed up with The Cash Brothers (former Skydigger Peter Cash and his brother Andrew) to release, Skydiggers/Cash Brothers, an acoustic album. In 2008 they released City of Sirens, followed by the compilationThe Truth About Us in 2009.

The band returned in 2012 when they released Northern Shore through MapleMusic Recordings. In 2013, the band released No. 1 Northern, an album of cover versions of songs by Canadian songwriters, including Neil Young, Gordon Lightfoot, Ron Sexsmith, Gene MacLellan, Linda McRae, Charlie Angus and Andrew Cash. They also released the album She Comes Into The Room.

In 2013, the band released the five-track EP Angels for the holiday season. A year later, this was expanded to 11 songs and released as a full album. The band are currently signed to Latent Recordings.

On January 1, 2017, Skydiggers were part of CBC's The Strombo Show's Hip 30, where Canadian bands covered songs from The Tragically Hip to commemorate the Hip's 30th anniversary. The band covered the song "The Depression Suite: The Rock". 2017 also saw the release of the Skydiggers latest LP Warmth of the Sun.

The band is a member of the Canadian charity Artists Against Racism.

== Finlayson/Maize ==
Josh Finlayson and Andy Maize of the Skydiggers have collaborated on a side project of their own named Finlayson/Maize. The duo released their album Dark Hollow under the project name.

== Discography ==
=== Albums ===
Year	Album	CAN
1990	Skydiggers	
1992	Restless	34
1993	Just Over This Mountain	42
1995	Road Radio	47
1997	Desmond's Hip City	
1999	Still Restless: The Lost Tapes	
2000	There and Back	
2003	Bittersweet Harmony	
2006	Skydiggers/Cash Brothers	
2008	City of Sirens	
2009	The Truth About Us: A Twenty Year Retrospective	
2012	Northern Shore	
2013	All of Our Dreaming: Live 1988, 2000 & 2012	
2013	No. 1 Northern	
2013	She Comes Into the Room	
2013	Angels (EP)	
2014	Angels (Album)	
2016	Here Without You – The Songs of Gene Clark	
2017	Warmth of the Sun	
2019	Let's Get Friendship Right	
2023	Hide Your Light (EP)	
2023	Bide Your Time (EP)	
2025	Dreams & Second Chances	

=== Singles ===
Year	Single	Chart Positions		Album
Year	Single	CAN AC	CAN	Album
1990	"Monday Morning"		83	Skydiggers
1990	"I Will Give You Everything"	24	38	Skydiggers
1990	"We Don't Talk Much Anymore"			Skydiggers
1991	"Maybe It's Just Not Good Enough"			Skydiggers
1992	"A Penny More"	27	36	Restless
1992	"Feel You Closer"			Restless
1993	"Just Over This Mountain"			Just Over This Mountain
1993	"I'm Wondering"			Just Over This Mountain
1994	"80 Odd Hours"			Just Over This Mountain
1995	"What Do You See?"		22	Road Radio
1996	"It's a Pity"			Road Radio
1996	"You've Got a Lot of Nerve"			Road Radio
1998	"Dear Henry"			Desmond's Hip City
2003	"Anything for You"			Bittersweet Harmony

=== Non-album tracks ===
- "One Day I Walk" (Kick at the Darkness, 1991)
- "Mr. Soul" (Borrowed Tunes: A Tribute to Neil Young, 1994)
- "St. Dunstan's One Request" (Pine Ridge: An Open Letter To Allan Rock/Songs For Leonard Peltier, 1996)
- "All of Our Dreaming" ("Shape of Things to Come" CD single, 1997)
- "Mini-Bar Superstar" ("Shape of Things to Come" CD single, 1997)
- "When You're Down" (Have Not Been the Same: The CanRock Renaissance 1985-1995, 2012)
