= Sarah Sheard =

Canadian novelist (born 1953)

- Born: February 13, 1953; Toronto, Ontario, Canada
- Occupations: novelist, creative writing instructor, psychotherapist
- Notable work: Almost Japanese; Krank: Love in the New Dark Times

Sarah Sheard (born February 13, 1953, in Toronto, Ontario) is a Canadian novelist.

Sheard published her first novel, Almost Japanese, in 1985. Her latest novel, her first political fiction, came out in fall, 2012. She has been a creative writing instructor at Glendon College was a member of the editorial board of Coach House Press for 13 years and has been a writing mentor with the Humber School for Writers at Humber College since 1995. Her short videos about her novel, Krank: Love in the New Dark Times, are viewable on VIMEO. She also rides (Western reining) competitively and several of her reining videos are viewable on VIMEO.

She is in private practice as a psychotherapist with an MA in Counselling Psych, certification as a Gestalt Therapist and certified as a mediator. She specializes in couple and family counselling.

She is the sister of pop singer Mia Sheard and pianist John Sheard, and the great-great-granddaughter of Joseph Sheard, a former mayor of Toronto.

== Books ==
- Almost Japanese (1985)
- The Swing Era (1993)
- The Hypnotist (1999)
- Krank: Love in the New Dark Times (2012)
