= Page One (Steven Page album) =

2010 album by Steven Page

Studio album by Steven Page
- Released: October 19, 2010
- Recorded: Fall 2009–spring 2010; Fresh Baked Woods, Ontario
- Genres: Pop rock, alternative rock
- Length: 47:17
- Labels: Anthem/Universal (Canada); Zoë/Rounder (US)
- Producers: Steven Page, John Fields

Steven Page chronology
A Singer Must Die (2010)	Page One (2010)	Heal Thyself Pt. 1: Instinct (2016)

Singles from Page One
- 1. "Indecision" Released: July 27, 2010

Professional ratings
Review scores
Source	Rating
AllMusic	3.5/5 stars

Page One is an album by Steven Page, released by Anthem Records on 19 October 2010. It is his first solo album of original material since departing Barenaked Ladies in February 2009.

Page One includes seven songs composed by Page with longtime collaborator Stephen Duffy and a pair of songs with first-time collaborator Craig Northey. The remaining three songs were composed solely by Page.

== Singles ==
The first single was "Indecision", released on 27 July 2010; the single peaked at No. 25 on the Billboard Adult Alternative Songs chart. The music video debuted on 9 October 2010. The second single was "Over Joy". No video was made for the song.

== Commercial performance ==
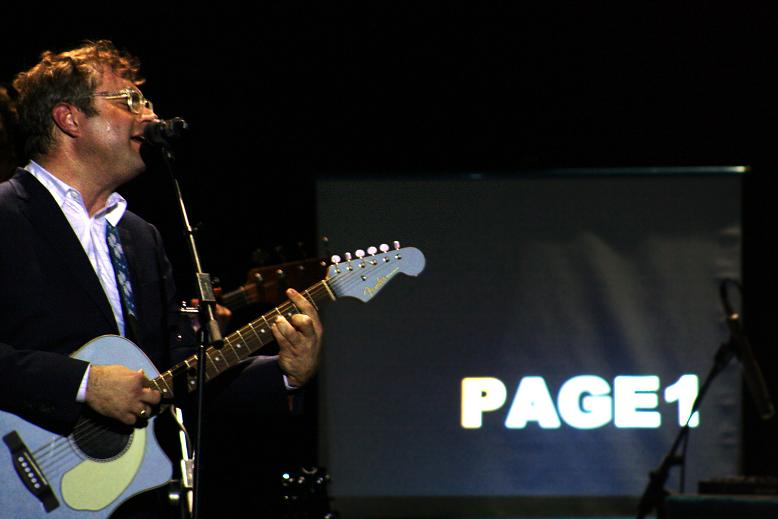
Page touring in support of Page One

Page One peaked at No. 58 on the Canadian Albums Chart. It did not make the Billboard 200 chart in the United States; however, it did peak at No. 6 on the Heatseekers Albums Chart. It also finished in third place on CBC Radio 2's "Top Canadian Albums of 2010", as voted by the station's listeners.

== Track listing ==
All tracks are written by Steven Page and Stephen Duffy, except where noted.

No.	Title	Writer(s)	Length
1.	"A New Shore"	Steven Page; Craig Northey	3:49
2.	"Indecision"		2:55
3.	"Clifton Springs"	Steven Page	4:37
4.	"Entourage"		3:24
5.	"Marry Me"	Steven Page	2:27
6.	"All the Young Monogamists"	Steven Page	3:22
7.	"She's Trying to Save Me"		3:52
8.	"Over Joy"		3:39
9.	"If You Love Me"		3:43
10.	"Leave Her Alone"	Steven Page; Craig Northey	3:46
11.	"Queen of America"		3:09
12.	"The Chorus Girl"		5:38
Total length:			47:17

== Personnel ==
- Steven Page – vocals, guitar, keyboards, glockenspiel, percussion
- John Fields – bass guitar, guitar, keyboards, programming, drums, accordion, mandolin

Additional personnel

- Bryden Baird – flugelhorn on 6; Flugelhorn, trumpet, piano, glockenspiel on 12
- Jay Baird – bass on 12; Clarinet on 6
- Jesse Baird – Eb horn on 6; Drums, percussion on 12
- Ken Chastain – percussion, programing, special effects
- Dorian Crozier – drums on 5 and 9
- Esthero – vocals on 2 and 4
- Kevin Fox – cello
- Brian Gallagher – flute on 2; clarinet on 4
- Karen Graves – violin, flute
- Stephen Lu – orchestral arrangement, keyboards on 1
- Christine Munn – vocals on 3 and 9
- Will Owsley – pedal steel on 3 and 10
- Glen Phillips – vocals on 8
- Tim Pierce – guitar on 2 and 3; Banjo on 3
- Pete Thomas – drums, percussion
- Michael Nelson – horn arrangement, trombone on 10
- Kenni Holmen – tenor sax, flute on 10
- Steve Strand – trumpet on 10
- Dave Jensen – trumpet on 10
- Kathy Jensen – baritone sax on 10

== Production ==
- Producers: John Fields, Steven Page
- Recording: John Fields (tracks 1–5, 7–11), Vic Florencia (tracks 6 and 12)
- Assistant engineering: C. Todd Nelson
- Mixing: Paul David Hager, John Fields
- Additional recording: Steven Page
- Mastering: Dave McNair
- Art direction/Design: re:form
- Concept/Illustrations: Olly Moss
- Cover photography: David Bergman
- Booklet photography: Valerie Joidon-Keaton
- Management: Ray Danniels

== Singles ==
Single information
"Indecision"
- Released: 2010
- Format: CD
