= Mia Sheard =

Canadian pop singer-songwriter

Mia Sheard is a Canadian pop singer-songwriter.

Sheard was classically trained at the Royal Conservatory of Music. She released her debut album With Love and Squalor in 1997, and followed up with the albums Reptilian in 1999 and Anemone in 2002.

In 2008, she organized a Joni Mitchell tribute concert at Hugh's Room in Toronto. This became a regular touring show, which featured artists including Kurt Swinghammer, Lori Cullen, Valery Gore, Snowblink and David Matheson.

She subsequently put her career on hold to study psychotherapy, and is now a practicing therapist in Toronto. In 2013 she released Curse of the Vorus, her first new album since Anemone.

== Personal life ==
She is the sister of novelist Sarah Sheard and pianist John Sheard, the great-great-granddaughter of Joseph Sheard, a former Mayor of Toronto, and was the wife of record producer Michael Phillip Wojewoda.

== Discography ==
- With Love and Squalor (1997)
- Reptilian (1999; Missing in Action)
- Anemone (2002; Perimeter)
- Curse of the Vorus (2013)
