= Old World Vulture (band) =

Canadian four-piece instrumental post-rock band

- Origin: Toronto, Ontario, Canada
- Genres: Instrumental post-rock
- Years active: 2008–present
- Members: Mike Costanzo; Devin Hughes; Jamie Hunter; Anthony Perri
- Website: oldworldvulture.ca

Old World Vulture is a Canadian four-piece instrumental post-rock band formed in 2008 in Toronto.

== Biography ==
The band formed in 2008 and released its self-titled debut EP on May 11, 2010. The EP was recorded by Chris Hegge (Fucked Up, The Meligrove Band, The Coast) in Toronto. The album reached the Top 50 (weekly) and Top 200 (monthly) positions on !earshot's Canadian campus and community radio charts. A music video was released for "Too Much Eye Makeup," a song from the EP.

The band released its debut LP, Trophy Lovers, on July 27, 2012.

Old World Vulture has played in several music festivals including Canadian Music Week, NXNE and SCENE Music Festival, and has performed alongside bands such as The American Dollar, Arms and Sleepers, Caspian, Grails, The Luyas, Mogwai, No Joy, PS I Love You, Royal Bangs, and Suuns.

== Reception ==
Critics have said the band's songs bring "an immediacy not often heard in the genre," and Exclaim! wrote that the band infuses "contagious synth melodies with fuzzed-out guitars and frenetic rhythms, to near perfection." Kate Harper from CHARTattack.com wrote, "I'd long ago written post-rock off as a tired, boring, stale, repetitive genre that lacked creativity. But Old World Vulture's self-titled release holds the kind of promise that's just unique enough to make me reconsider that."

== Members ==
- Mike Costanzo (electric guitars)
- Devin Hughes (synthesizers)
- Jamie Hunter (drums)
- Anthony Perri (bass guitar)

== Discography ==
=== LPs ===
- Trophy Lovers (2012)

=== EPs ===
- Old World Vulture (2010)

=== Digital singles ===
- "Benny" b/w "Benny (Valiise SideSpace Remix)" (2009)
- "How the West Was Lost" b/w "How Was the West Lost? (Valiise Remix)" (2009)
- "Bastard Engine" b/w "Bastard Engine (Valiise OpenSpace Remix)" (2009)
- "Trophy Lovers" (2011)
- "J.R. Flood" (2012)

=== Compilations ===
- Hi-Hat Comp No. 5: "How the West Was Lost" (Hi-Hat Recordings, 2010)

=== Videography ===
- "Too Much Eye Makeup" (2010)

== See also ==
- List of bands from Canada
- Music of Canada
- Canadian rock
- List of post-rock bands
