= John Sheard =

Canadian pianist, producer and arranger

- Origin: Canada
- Occupation(s): Pianist, record producer, arranger
- Instrument: Piano
- Website: johnsheardmusic.com

John Sheard is a Canadian pianist, producer and arranger, who throughout his thirty year career has recorded and performed with many North American artists, and is most recognized for his work on Stuart McLean's Vinyl Cafe.

== Career ==
Sheard has served as the music director for Stuart McLean's Vinyl Cafe touring orchestra since 1998, and has also been the music director for many CBC Radio programs, including Peter Gzowski's "Red River Rally" Morningside show.

Sheard's recording history has led to over 200 records, as both solo and backup, with such artists as Rita MacNeil, Ian and Sylvia Tyson, Dan Hill, Rita Coolidge, Olivia Newton-John, Mary Margaret O'Hara, Celine Dion, Ronnie Milsap, Colm Wilkinson, Tom Paxton, Willie P. Bennett, and The Henrys.

Sheard has composed and/or arranged for various artists, including Murray McLauchlan, The Pointer Sisters, The Nylons, Shirley Eikhard, Andrea Martin, Caitlin Hanford, and Quartette.

His work has appeared on various U.S. television shows, including A&E Biography, Sunset Beach, Sesame Street, Sesame Park, Showtime, Days of Our Lives, General Hospital, and Late Night with David Letterman.

As a producer Sheard has worked with The Guess Who, Dan Hill, The Henrys, Buster Poindexter, Gregg Lawless, Caitlin Hanford, The Good Brothers and more.

=== Solo ===
While he always reported to enjoy working with great singers and players, he has also recorded some of his own music. Sheard's first solo CD, Jerusalem, consists largely of pieces that he performed at Vinyl Cafe concerts across Canada. Sheard is said to be grateful to Stuart McLean for giving him musical carte blanche on his show which was largely responsible for the creation of Jerusalem and his second CD, Nocturnus.

Sheard's disc Polyhymnia is a collection of hymns and carols, featuring selections gleaned from the 1938 revision of the 'Hymn Book of the Anglican Church of Canada', and includes Sheard's moving rendition of The Coventry Carol. His latest disc, 88, so named for the 88 keys on an average piano musical keyboard, is composed primarily of pieces composed by Sheard. It was recorded at Metalworks Studios in Mississauga, Ontario.

== Personal life ==
He is the brother of novelist Sarah Sheard and singer-songwriter Mia Sheard, and the great-great-grandson of Joseph Sheard, a former Mayor of Toronto.

Sheard currently lives in Toronto, Ontario.
