= Steven Page =

Canadian singer and songwriter (born 1970)

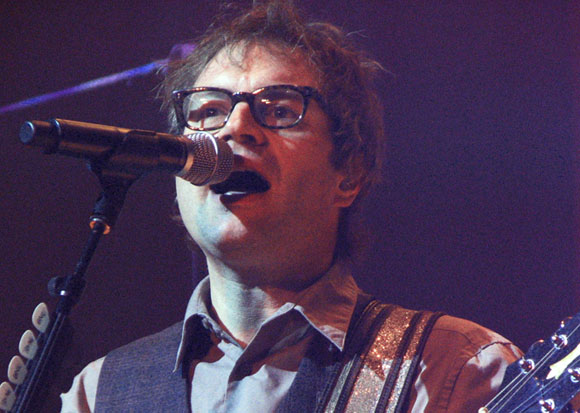
- Page in 2008

Background information
- Born: Steven Jay Page; June 22, 1970 (age 56); Scarborough, Ontario, Canada
- Genres: Rock; alternative rock; folk rock
- Occupations: Singer-songwriter; musician; record producer
- Instruments: Vocals; guitar; piano
- Years active: 1988–present
- Labels: Zoë/Rounder, Cooking Vinyl
- Member of: Trans-Canada Highwaymen
- Formerly of: Barenaked Ladies; the Vanity Project
- Spouses: Carolyn Ricketts (m. 1993; div. 2009) Christine Benedicto (m. 2011)
- Website: stevenpage.com

Steven Jay Page (born June 22, 1970) is a Canadian singer, songwriter, and musician. He co-founded the rock band Barenaked Ladies with Ed Robertson in 1988 and served as one of its principal vocalists and songwriters until his departure in 2009. His compositions for the group include "Brian Wilson", "The Old Apartment", and "It's All Been Done"; he also co-wrote such songs as "If I Had $1000000" and "Pinch Me".

Outside Barenaked Ladies, Page has released several solo albums and has composed music for productions at the Stratford Festival. His other projects include collaborations with the English musician Stephen Duffy and the Art of Time Ensemble. He is also a member of the Canadian supergroup Trans-Canada Highwaymen.

== Early life ==
Steven Jay Page was born in the Toronto suburb of Scarborough on June 22, 1970. His father was a drummer, and Page studied piano and sang with the Toronto Mendelssohn Youth Choir while growing up.

Page attended Woburn Collegiate Institute with Ed Robertson, and they later worked as counsellors at the Scarborough Schools Music Camp. Page studied English at York University, with a minor in music theory and choral studies, before leaving to concentrate on the band.

== Career ==
=== Barenaked Ladies ===
Page at Massey Hall in 2005

Robertson invited Page to perform with him at a charity show under the name Barenaked Ladies in 1988. The two continued as a duo before other musicians joined the group. Page became one of the band's principal vocalists and songwriters and played acoustic and electric guitar in the studio and onstage.

Barenaked Ladies achieved commercial success in Canada with its 1991 independently released cassette Barenaked Ladies, commonly known as The Yellow Tape, and their debut studio album, Gordon (1992). International success followed during the late 1990s, with Stunt (1998) and the single "One Week". Page wrote or co-wrote much of the group's repertoire during his tenure, frequently collaborating with Robertson and the English musician Stephen Duffy. In 2002, Page and Robertson received an International Achievement Award at the SOCAN Awards for "Pinch Me".

By the mid-2000s, Page had reservations about the band's creative direction. He later said that he participated in the recording of Barenaked for the Holidays (2004) and Snacktime! (2008) despite opposing the projects. Of Snacktime!, he said, "It was a lot of fun to do, but it wasn't my idea. I was along for the ride."

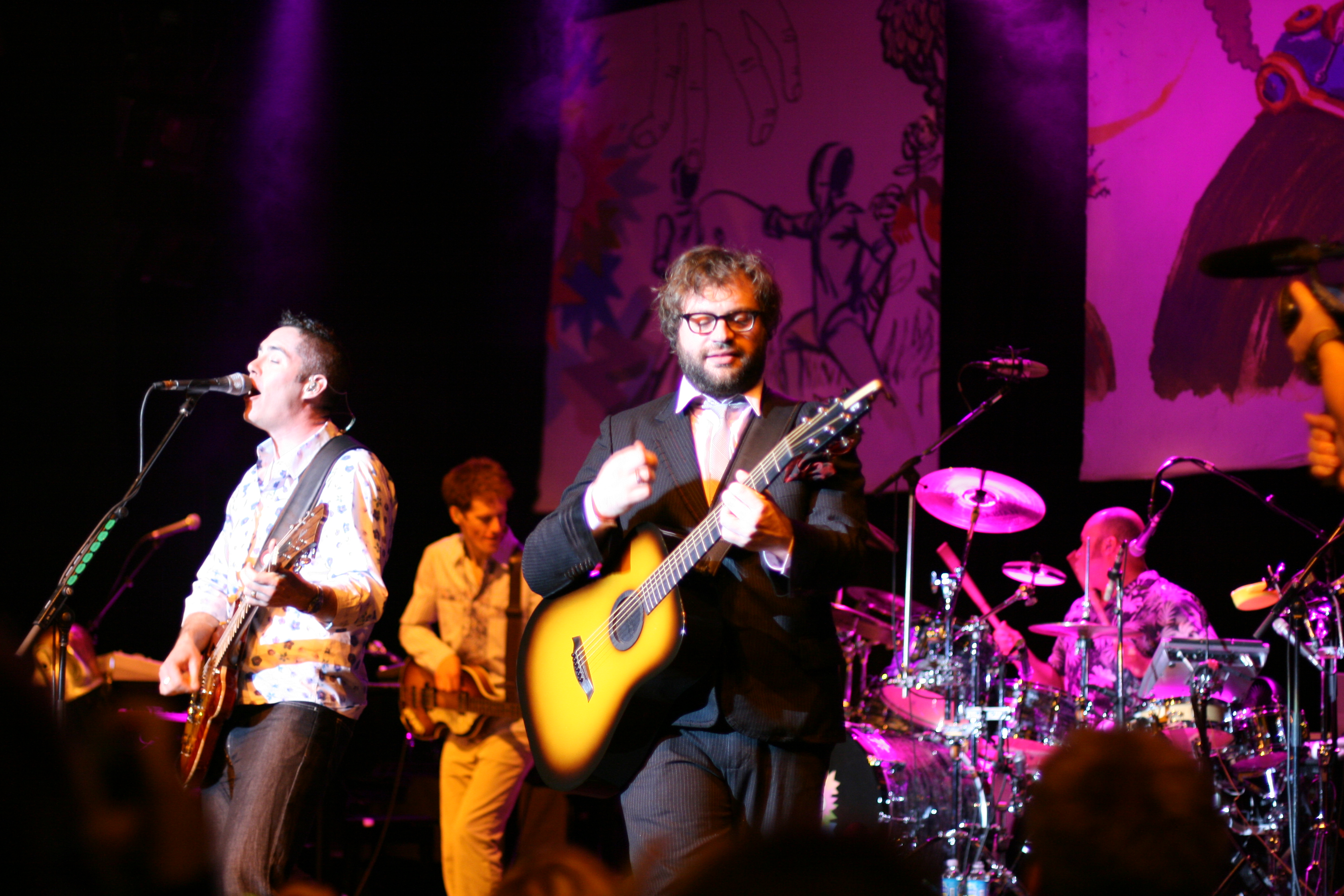
Page performing with Barenaked Ladies in 2008

In February 2009, Page and the band announced that he was leaving by mutual agreement to pursue solo and theatrical projects, while the remaining members would continue as Barenaked Ladies. The decision had been made partly because the other members wanted to record another album and Page did not. Page said that his widely publicized 2008 drug arrest hastened an already imminent separation.

In 2011, Page said that the band had ceased to be "the joyous place that it once was" and that its work had become defined by stress, although the members continued to enjoy performing together.

On March 25, 2018, Page performed with Barenaked Ladies for the first time in nine years, at the Juno Awards in Vancouver, marking the band's induction into the Canadian Music Hall of Fame. In a 2026 interview, Page said that he proposed performing "One Week" and "If I Had $1000000", because the songs highlighted his musical interplay with Robertson, which he considered a defining feature of that era of the band.

In the same 2026 interview, Page said that the members no longer wanted to be around one another by the time of his departure. He cited his divorce, efforts to maintain his relationship with his children, and travel restrictions stemming from his arrest as additional strains. Because the restrictions required him to travel separately to American engagements for nearly a year, he said it eventually became apparent that they were no longer functioning as the same band. Asked about another reunion, Page said, "I think they don't want to do it. I don't think they want to work with me. And I've had to kind of be okay with that".

=== Solo and theatrical work ===
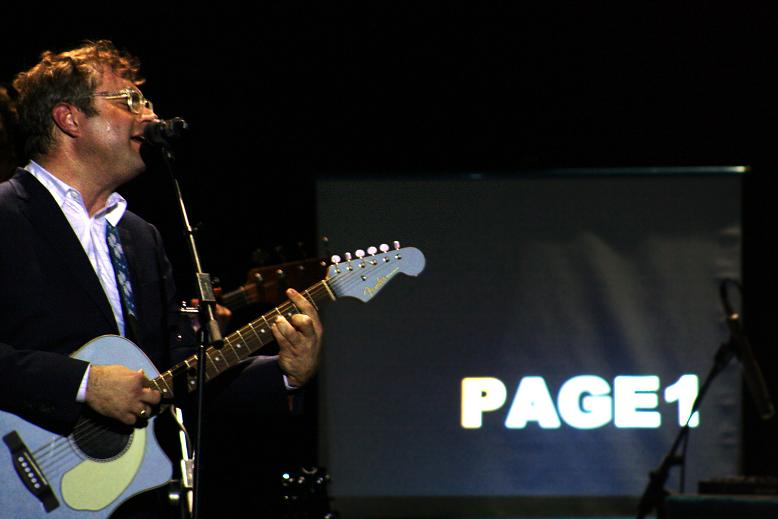
Page in 2010, during his Page One tour

Page began collaborating with Stephen Duffy, a founding member of Duran Duran, in the early 1990s. Several of their compositions appeared on Barenaked Ladies albums, beginning with Maybe You Should Drive (1994). In 2005, Page released an album of their collaborations under the name The Vanity Project.

Page also composed music for the Stratford Festival. His credits there include As You Like It, Bartholomew Fair, Coriolanus, Cymbeline, Hamlet, Macbeth, and The Miser.

In February 2010, Page and the Art of Time Ensemble released A Singer Must Die, a studio album of songs they had previously performed in concert. This was followed by a 12-date tour.

Page's first album of original material under his own name, Page One, was released in October 2010. It included songs written with Duffy and the Canadian musician Craig Northey.

In 2011, Page performed the Canadian national anthem at the 2011 NHL Winter Classic, and he sang Leonard Cohen's "Hallelujah" at the state funeral of Jack Layton.

He released the songs "A Different Sort of Solitude" and "Manchild" in 2012. The former, written for the film French Immersion, received a nomination for best original song at the 32nd Genie Awards.

His second album of original solo material, Heal Thyself Pt. 1: Instinct, came out in March 2016. Its follow-up, Discipline: Heal Thyself, Pt. II, was issued in September 2018. The latter incorporated political themes alongside Page's personal songwriting. Exclaim! described it as recapturing the anger and activism of his earlier work.

Page and the playwright Daniel MacIvor wrote the musical Here's What It Takes, which was scheduled to premiere at the 2020 Stratford Festival. The production was cancelled when the festival suspended its season during the COVID-19 pandemic. Page subsequently began a series of online concerts and performed material from the musical with members of its cast for Q.

In December 2021, Page released "Canada Loves You Back", featuring Odds, after performing the song as a tribute to the actor Ryan Reynolds at the Governor General's Performing Arts Awards.

He issued the album Excelsior in September 2022. It addressed grief, loss, and loneliness, including the deaths of Page's father and several friends.

=== Trans-Canada Highwaymen ===
In 2016, Page formed the Trans-Canada Highwaymen with Moe Berg of the Pursuit of Happiness, Chris Murphy of Sloan, and Craig Northey of Odds. The group initially performed songs associated with its members' respective bands. Its debut studio album, Explosive Hits Vol. 1, was released in October 2023 and consisted primarily of versions of Canadian hit songs from the late 1960s and 1970s.

== Other work ==
Page hosted the food and travel television series The Illegal Eater, which premiered in 2013 and followed him as he visited underground restaurants and pop-up dining establishments. He made a guest appearance in the How I Met Your Mother episode "P.S. I Love You" in 2013. In December 2025, he appeared as a fictional early-20th-century performer bearing his name in the Murdoch Mysteries episode "Sugar Plum Murdoch". He wrote and performed "Christmas in Toronto" for the episode.

In 2026, Page appeared as an interviewee in CFNY: The Spirit of Radio, a documentary about the Toronto alternative rock station CFNY-FM.

== Personal life ==
Page's first wife was the Toronto musician and teacher Carolyn Ricketts. They separated in 2007 and divorced in 2009; they have three sons.

Page was arrested in Fayetteville, New York, in July 2008, and charged with possession of cocaine. In October, the felony charge was reduced to a misdemeanor. Under the arrangement, the charges would be dismissed if Page completed treatment and remained free of further offences for six months.

In 2009, Page purchased a house in Fayetteville with then-girlfriend Christine Benedicto and split his time between there and Toronto, where his children reside. The couple married in July 2011.

Page has spoken publicly about living with bipolar disorder and previously using alcohol and drugs to cope with its symptoms. He has advocated seeking treatment and reducing the stigma surrounding mental illness.

== Discography ==
=== Solo studio albums ===
- Page One (2010)
- Heal Thyself Pt. 1: Instinct (2016)
- Discipline: Heal Thyself, Pt. II (2018)
- Excelsior (2022)
- Steven’s Greetings (2026)

=== Collaborative albums ===
- The Vanity Project – with Stephen Duffy (2005)
- A Singer Must Die – with Art of Time Ensemble (2010)
- Explosive Hits Vol. 1 – with Trans-Canada Highwaymen (2023)
