= Valery Gore =

Canadian musician

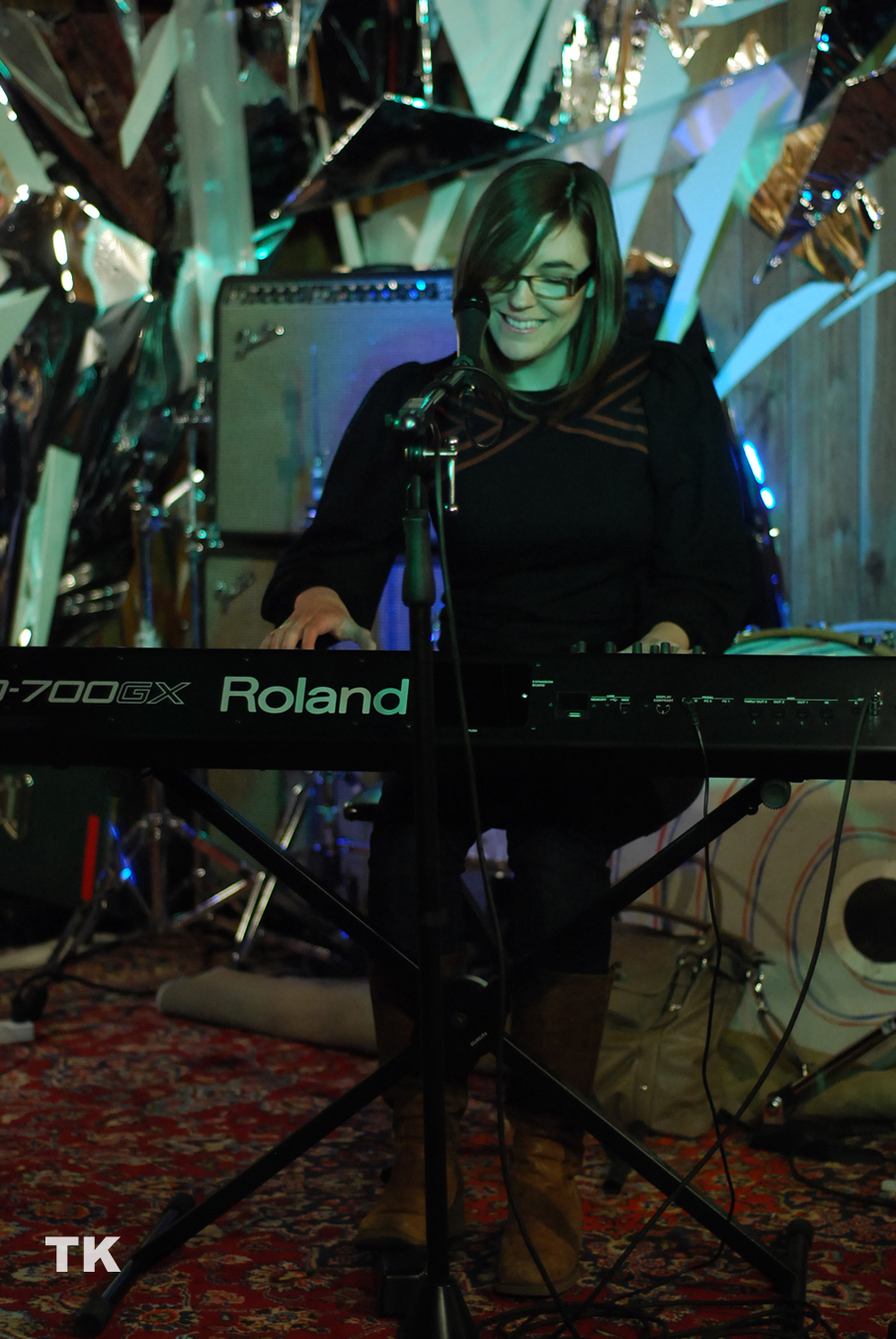
- Gore in April 2010

Background information
- Origin: Toronto, Ontario, Canada
- Genres: Indie pop
- Occupations: Musician, songwriter
- Instruments: Vocals, piano
- Labels: Six Shooter, Do Right!
- Website: valerygore.com

Valery Gore is a Canadian indie pop singer-songwriter and pianist.

A classically trained pianist who describes her own style as "jazz and classically influenced piano pop", Gore released her self-titled debut album on Six Shooter Records in 2005, and followed up with Avalanche to Wandering Bear on Do Right! Music in 2008. She has toured Canada, Italy and Japan, both as a headliner and as an opening act for Jorane, Josh Ritter and Joel Plaskett.

== Discography ==
- Valery Gore (2005)
- Avalanche to Wandering Bear (2008)
- Saturated Spring (2013)
- Idols in the Dark Heart (2014)
