= DROG Records =

Dave's Records of Guelph, or DROG, was a Canadian independent record label. It was founded in 1993 in Guelph, Ontario by musicians Dave Teichroeb and Lewis Melville.

Artists who have released records on DROG include Rheostatics, Skydiggers, The Inbreds, Mia Sheard and Chris Brown and Kate Fenner.

The label ceased releasing albums by individual artists in the early 2000s, but remained in operation as a producer of compilation albums featuring songs by independent artists organized around particular themes.

== See also ==
- List of record labels
