= Jonathan Goldsmith (musician) =

Canadian musician and composer

- Occupations: film and television composer, musician, record producer
- Known for: Nick Buzz, Art of Time Ensemble

Jonathan (Jon) Goldsmith is a Canadian musician, arranger, producer, and composer. Best known as a composer of film and television scores, he has also been associated with various projects as a musician, including Nick Buzz and the Art of Time Ensemble, and production of albums by artists including Bruce Cockburn, Jane Siberry, Martin Tielli, Hugh Marsh, Bourbon Tabernacle Choir, and Sarah Slean.

== Career ==
In 1992, Goldsmith, along with Hugh Marsh, Martin Tielli and Rob Piltch, provided backup for a track on the album Back to the Garden; these four later formed the band Nick Buzz and produced two albums and an EP. Goldsmith played piano in the group.

For his work as a composer Goldsmith won four Gemini Awards, for his work on Pit Pony, Dead Silence, Trudeau II: Maverick in the Making and The Nativity, a Canadian Screen Award for Titanic, and a BAFTA Award for Sex Traffic. He has also received nine other Gemini Award nominations, and four Genie Award nominations for Best Original Score.

His other film and television credits include Global Heresy, Such a Long Journey, Scorn, Away from Her, October 1970, Take This Waltz, Rare Birds, Visiting Hours, Casino Jack, Compulsion, Lost Souls, Above and Beyond, Jewel, Cell 213, High Life, Score: A Hockey Musical, Diplomatic Immunity, and Wiebo's War.

As a record producer, he has garnered three Juno Award nominations for Producer of the Year, for Bob & Doug McKenzie's comedy single "Take Off" in 1982, Bruce Cockburn's album Stealing Fire in 1984 and Hugh Marsh's album Shaking the Pumpkin in 1989.

At the 10th Canadian Screen Awards in 2022, he won the award for Best Original Score for his work on All My Puny Sorrows. At the 11th Canadian Screen Awards in 2023, he won the inaugural award for Best Original Music in a Documentary for his work on To Kill a Tiger.
