= Peter Cash =

Canadian singer-songwriter

Peter Cash is a Canadian singer-songwriter.

He was a member of Skydiggers from 1988 to 1995. After leaving that band, he began to write and record music with his brother, singer-songwriter Andrew Cash, which was released as The Cash Brothers.

Peter Cash is an established figure in the Canadian music scene. He was one of the songwriters the Skydiggers (formed by Josh Finlayson and Andy Maize) from 1988 to 1995. In 1989, the Skydiggers became the first Canadian signing to Enigma Records. Their self-titled debut album was released the following year, and spawned the singles "Monday Morning" and "I Will Give You Everything". In 1992, FRE Records released the band's second (and most popular) album, Restless. "A Penny More", the lead single from Restless, became their biggest hit, produced by John Oliveira and the band at Hamilton's Grant Avenue Studios.

In 1993, the Skydiggers' third album, Just Over This Mountain, was released and consolidated the band's status by winning a number of music awards, including the Juno Award for Most Promising Group.

After the tour to support the Road Radio album, Peter Cash left the band. After 7 years of touring, writing, and recording with the Skydiggers, Peter and his brother, singer-songwriter Andrew Cash joined musical forces. The result was 1999's Raceway. The first song that they recorded together, in 1997, was the title track on the album.

The Cash Brothers earned critical acclaim and the respect of peers and fans alike with follow up albums How was Tomorrow (2001) and Brand New Night (2003).

In 2006, The Cash Brothers teamed up with the Skydiggers to release an acoustic album.
