= FRE Records =

Canadian record label

FRE Records, a.k.a. Flood Ross Entertainment, Inc., was a Mississauga, Ontario based independent record label in the 1990s. It was originally formed by former employees Terry Flood and Derrick Ross of Enigma Records after that label's Canadian operations folded.

The best-known bands on FRE were April Wine and Skydiggers.

In 1996, FRE filed for bankruptcy, and many of the records that had been released on the label, including Skydiggers' Restless (one of the bestselling Canadian indie records of the 1990s), ceased to be available in record stores.

In 1999, the Skydiggers recorded a new version of Restless, titled Still Restless: The Lost Tapes, since they still could not obtain their original master tapes from the label.

== See also ==
- List of record labels
