= List of awards and nominations received by Murphy Brown =

List of awards won by Murphy Brown
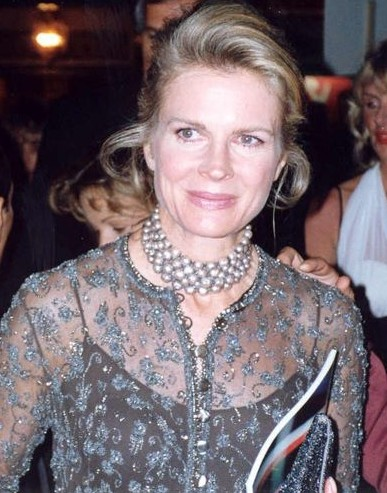
- Candice Bergen received many awards and nominations for her performance as the titular character.
Awards and nominations
Award	Won	Nominated
American Cinema Editors Awards	0	2
American Comedy Awards	1	7
American Television Awards	0	3
Artios Awards	2	7
BMI Film & TV Awards	6	6
Directors Guild of America Awards	2	5
Emmy Awards	18	62
Golden Globe Awards	3	15
Humanitas Prize	2	2
OFTA Television Awards	1	4
Peabody Award	1	1
Publicists Guild of America	2	2
Screen Actors Guild Awards	0	3
TCA Awards	2	4
TV Land Award	1	5
Q Awards	8	33
Writers Guild of America Award	2	4
Young Artist Award	0	1
- Total number of wins and nominations
Totals	51	168
- References

Murphy Brown is an American television sitcom created by Diane English and produced by Shukovsky English Entertainment and Warner Bros. Television. The series revolves around the titular character (Candice Bergen), a famous investigative journalist and news anchor for FYI, a fictional CBS television news series. Murphy Brown aired on CBS from November 14, 1988, to May 18, 1998, broadcasting 247 episodes over ten seasons during its initial run.

During the series' run, Murphy Brown received nominations for a variety of industry awards, including 62 Emmy awards (with 18 wins), 15 Golden Globe awards (with three wins), three Screen Actors Guild awards, 4 TCA awards (with two wins), 5 Directors Guild of America awards (with two wins) and 4 Writers Guild of America awards (with two wins).

Candice Bergen, for her portrayal of Murphy Brown, received the most individual awards and nominations, winning five Emmy Awards and a Golden Globe award. Several other actors and crew members in the series received many awards and nominations, including Faith Ford, Grant Shaud, Jay Thomas, Barnet Kellman and Tucker Wiard.

== Awards and nominations ==
=== American Comedy Awards ===
The American Comedy Award is an annual accolade created by George Schlatter in recognition of excellence in the field of comedy, most notably in film and television. Out of 7 nominations, Murphy Brown won an award for Funniest Female Performer in a TV Series (Leading Role) Network, Cable or Syndication, awarded to Candice Bergen.

Year	Category	Nominee(s)	Result	Ref
1989	Funniest Female Performer in a TV Series (Leading Role) Network, Cable or Syndication	Candice Bergen	Nominated	
1990	Funniest Female Performer in a TV Series (Leading Role) Network, Cable or Syndication	Candice Bergen	Nominated	
1990	Funniest Supporting Female Performer in a TV Series	Faith Ford	Nominated	
1991	Funniest Female Performer in a TV Series (Leading Role) Network, Cable or Syndication	Candice Bergen	Nominated	
1992	Funniest Female Performer in a TV Series (Leading Role) Network, Cable or Syndication	Candice Bergen	Won	
1996	Funniest Female Performer in a TV Series (Leading Role) Network, Cable or Syndication	Candice Bergen	Nominated	
1996	Funniest Supporting Female Performer in a TV Series	Faith Ford	Nominated	

=== Artios Awards ===
Presented by the Casting Society of America since 1985, the Artios Awards is an annual accolade that honors excellence in casting. Murphy Brown received seven nominations for the award for Best Casting for TV, Comedic Episodic during its tenure. The series won twice in 1989 and 1990.

Year	Category	Nominee(s)	Result	Ref
1989	Best Casting for TV, Comedic Episodic	Phyllis Huffman (pilot) and Andrea Cohen (series)	Won	
1990	Best Casting for TV, Comedic Episodic	Andrea Cohen	Won	
1991	Best Casting for TV, Comedic Episodic	Andrea Cohen	Nominated	
1992	Best Casting for TV, Comedic Episodic	Andrea Cohen	Nominated	
1993	Best Casting for TV, Comedic Episodic	Andrea Cohen	Nominated	
1994	Best Casting for TV, Comedic Episodic	Andrea Cohen	Nominated	
1995	Best Casting for TV, Comedic Episodic	Andrea Cohen	Nominated	

=== BMI Film & TV Awards ===
Year	Category	Nominee(s)	Result	Ref
1991	BMI TV Music Award	Steve Dorff	Won	
1992	BMI TV Music Award	Steve Dorff	Won	
1993	BMI TV Music Award	Steve Dorff	Won	
1994	BMI TV Music Award	Steve Dorff	Won	
1995	BMI TV Music Award	Steve Dorff	Won	
1996	BMI TV Music Award	Steve Dorff	Won	

=== Directors Guild of America Awards ===
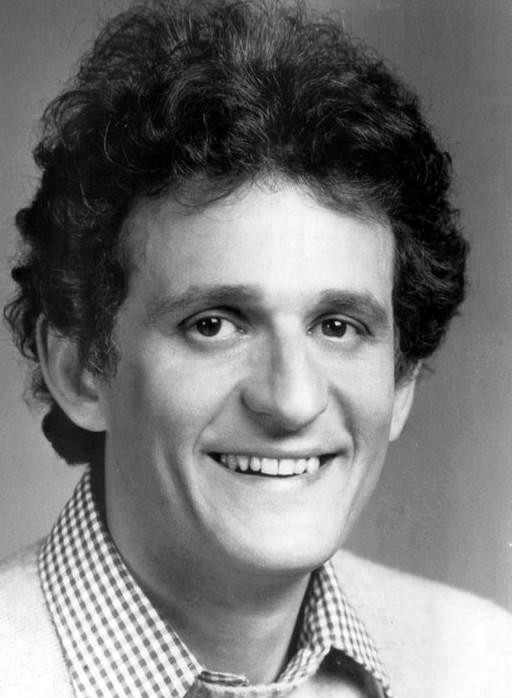
Peter Bonerz won a DGA award for his role as director on the episode "Uh-Oh: Part II."

Presented by the Directors Guild of America since 1938, The Directors Guild of America Award honors excellence in the field of direction. Murphy Brown received five nominations for the award for Outstanding Directorial Achievement in Comedy Series, three out of five for work by Barnet Kellman and the rest for work by Peter Bonerz. Both directors each won an award for the series.

Year	Category	Nominee(s)	Episodes(s)	Result	Ref
1988	Outstanding Directorial Achievement in Comedy Series	Barnet Kellman	for "Respect"	Nominated	
1989	Outstanding Directorial Achievement in Comedy Series	Barnet Kellman	for "Brown Like Me"	Won	
1990	Outstanding Directorial Achievement in Comedy Series	Barnet Kellman	for "Bob & Murphy & Ted & Avery"	Nominated	
1991	Outstanding Directorial Achievement in Comedy Series	Peter Bonerz	for "Uh-Oh: Part II"	Won	
1993	Outstanding Directorial Achievement in Comedy Series	Peter Bonerz	for "Angst for the Memories"	Nominated	

=== Emmy Awards ===
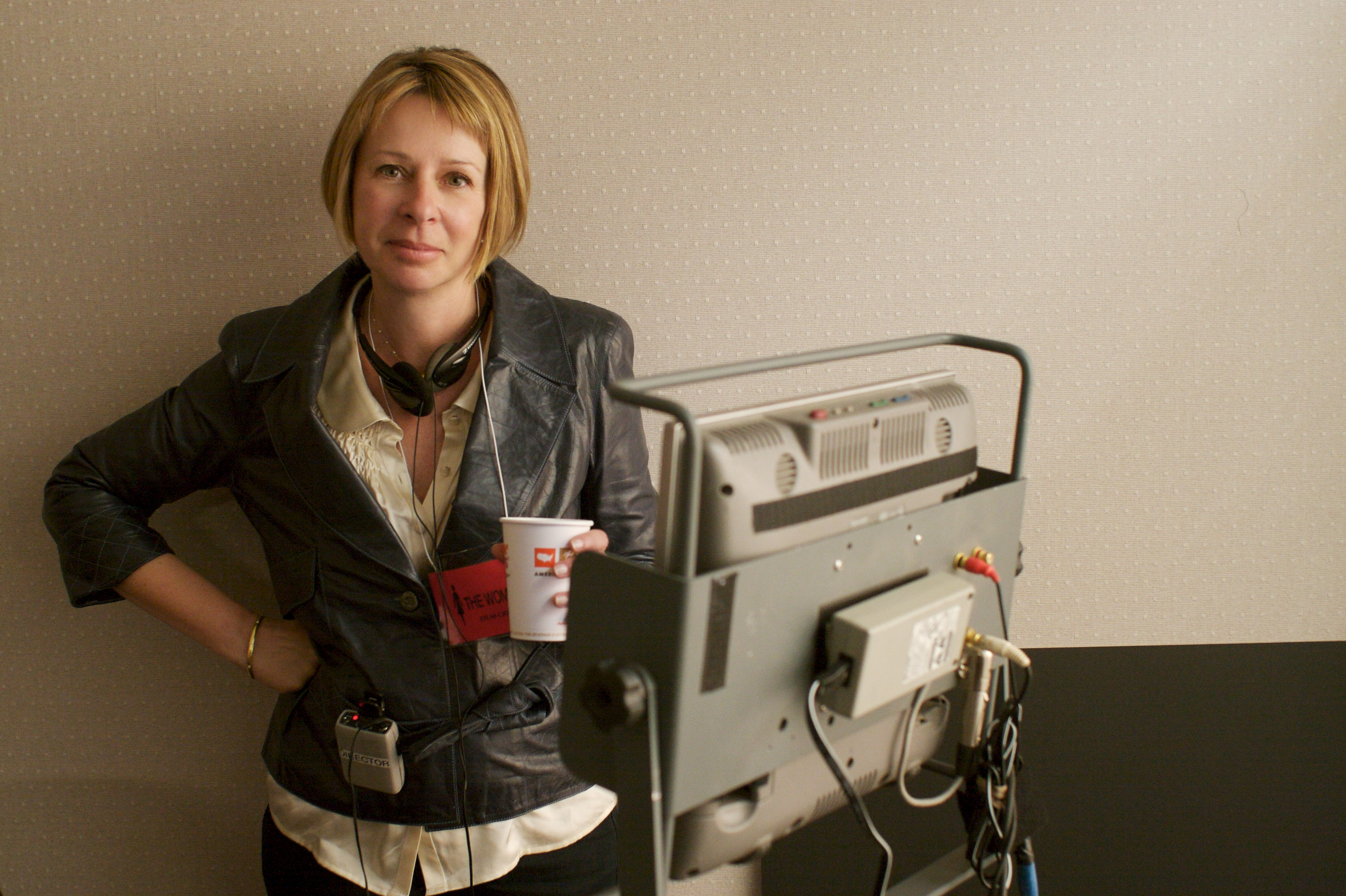
Diane English won two Emmy awards for her role as creator and producer of the series.

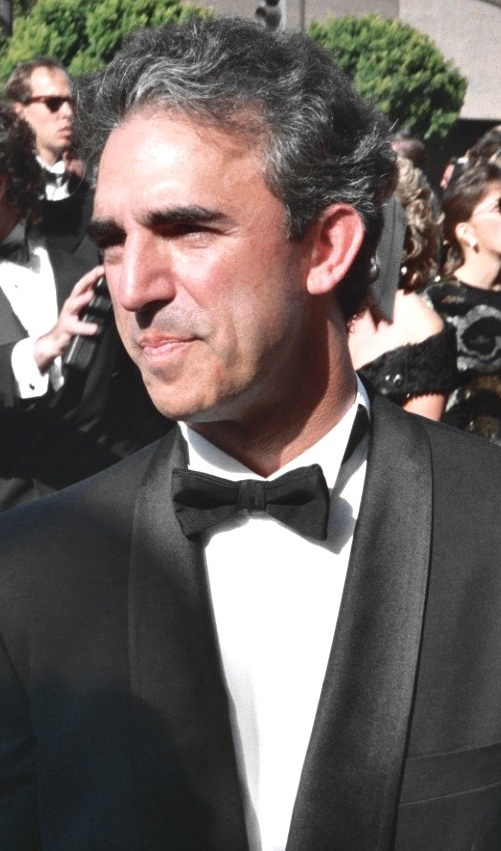
Jay Thomas received two Emmy awards for his role as Jerry Gold.

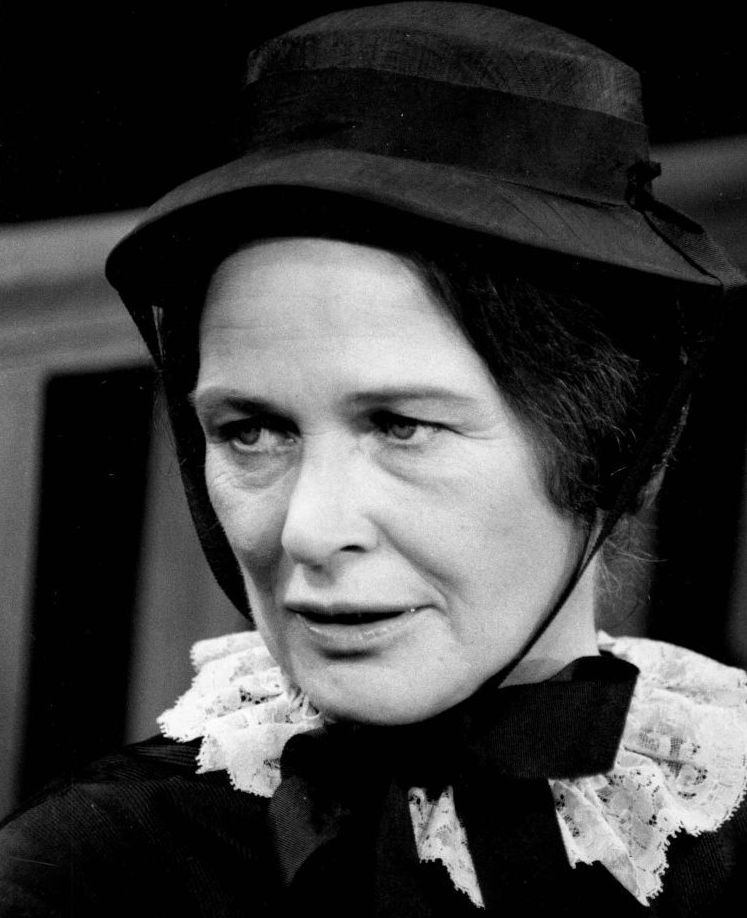
Colleen Dewhurst won two Emmy awards for her role as Murphy Brown's mother Avery.

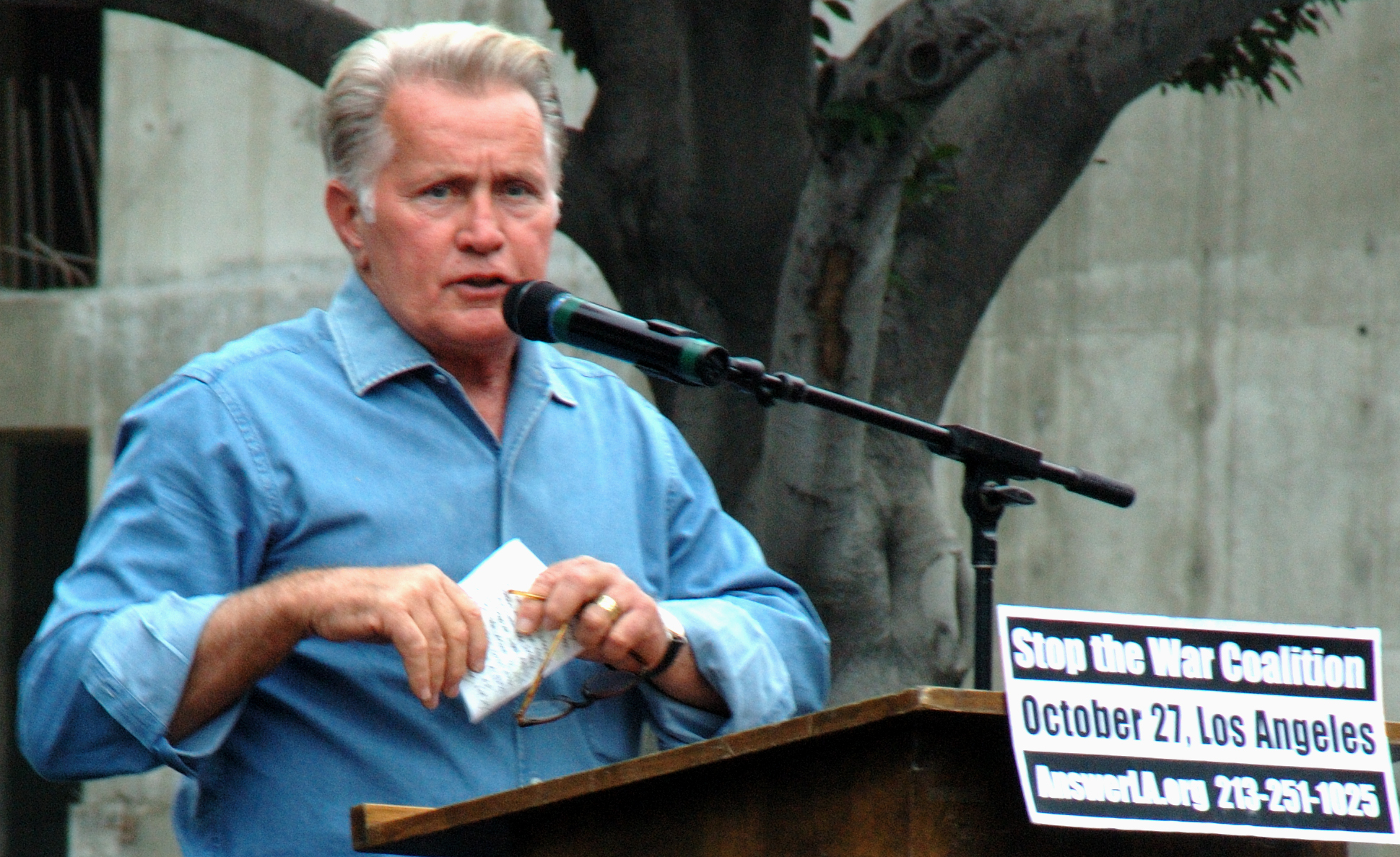
Martin Sheen won an Emmy award for his guest role as Nick Brody.

Murphy Brown received 62 Primetime Emmy Award nominations, with 18 wins — 15 Primetime and three Creative Arts. The series received five nominations for the award for Outstanding Comedy Series, winning twice in 1990 and 1992. Candice Bergen won the award for Outstanding Lead Actress in a Comedy Series five times, a record she shares with Julia Louis-Dreyfus and Mary Tyler Moore, and received two further nominations in 1991 and 1993. Murphy Brown received a number of nominations for guest performance awards. In the Outstanding Guest Actress in a Comedy Series category, Colleen Dewhurst won the award in 1989 and 1991. Jay Thomas won the Outstanding Guest Actor in a Comedy Series twice in 1990 and 1991 while Martin Sheen won the award in 1994. The series won the award for Outstanding Writing for a Comedy Series twice in 1989 and 1991 as well as the award for Outstanding Directing for a Comedy Series in 1992. The series won two Creative Arts Emmy Awards for Outstanding Editing for a Series – Multi-Camera Production for work by Tucker Wiard.

==== Primetime Emmy Awards ====
Year	Category	Nominee(s)	Episodes(s)	Result	Ref
1989	Outstanding Comedy Series	Diane English, Norm Gunzenhauser, Frank Pace, Tom Seeley, Joel Shukovsky, Korby Siamis, Deborah Smith and Russ Woody		Nominated	
1989	Outstanding Lead Actress in a Comedy Series	Candice Bergen as Murphy Brown	for "Respect"	Won	
1989	Outstanding Supporting Actor in a Comedy Series	Joe Regalbuto as Frank Fontana	for "Baby Love"	Nominated	
1989	Outstanding Supporting Actress in a Comedy Series	Faith Ford as Corky Sherwood	for "The Morning Show"	Nominated	
1989	Outstanding Guest Actress in a Comedy Series	Colleen Dewhurst as Avery Brown	for "Mama Said"	Won	
1989	Outstanding Directing for a Comedy Series	Barnet Kellman	for "Respect"	Nominated	
1989	Outstanding Writing for a Comedy Series	Diane English	for "Respect"	Won	
1990	Outstanding Comedy Series	Diane English, Joel Shukovsky, Korby Siamis, Tom Seeley, Norm Gunzenhauser, Russ Woody, Gary Dontzig, Steven Peterman, Barnet Kellman, and Deborah Smith		Won	
1990	Outstanding Lead Actress in a Comedy Series	Candice Bergen as Murphy Brown	for "Brown Like Me"	Won	
1990	Outstanding Supporting Actor in a Comedy Series	Charles Kimbrough as Jim Dial	for "Roasted"	Nominated	
1990	Outstanding Supporting Actress in a Comedy Series	Faith Ford as Corky Sherwood	for "And the Winner Is"	Nominated	
1990	Outstanding Guest Actor in a Comedy Series	Darren McGavin as Bill Brown	for "Brown Like Me"	Nominated	
1990	Outstanding Guest Actor in a Comedy Series	Jay Thomas as Jerry Gold	for "Heart of Gold"	Won	
1990	Outstanding Guest Actress in a Comedy Series	Morgan Fairchild as Julia St. Martin	for "TV or Not TV"	Nominated	
1990	Outstanding Directing for a Comedy Series	Barnet Kellman	for "Brown Like Me"	Nominated	
1990	Outstanding Writing for a Drama Series	Diane English	for "Brown Like Me"	Nominated	
1991	Outstanding Comedy Series	Diane English, Joel Shukovsky, Gary Dontzig, Steven Peterman, Tom Palmer, Barnet Kellman, Korby Siamis and Deborah Smith		Nominated	
1991	Outstanding Lead Actress in a Comedy Series	Candice Bergen as Murphy Brown	for "On Another Plane"	Nominated	
1991	Outstanding Supporting Actress in a Comedy Series	Faith Ford as Corky Sherwood	for "Trouble in Sherwood-Forrest"	Nominated	
1991	Outstanding Guest Actor in a Comedy Series	Alan Oppenheimer as Eugene Kinsella	for "Strike Two	Nominated	
1991	Outstanding Guest Actor in a Comedy Series	Jay Thomas as Jerry Gold	for "Gold Rush"	Won	
1991	Outstanding Guest Actress in a Comedy Series	Colleen Dewhurst as Avery Brown	for "Bob And Murphy And Ted And Avery"	Won	
1991	Outstanding Directing for a Comedy Series	Barnet Kellman	for "On Another Plane"	Nominated	
1991	Outstanding Writing for a Comedy Series	Diane English	for "On Another Plane"	Nominated	
1991	Outstanding Writing for a Comedy Series	Gary Dontzig and Steven Peterman	for "Jingle Hell, Jingle Hell, Jingle All the Way"	Won	
1992	Outstanding Comedy Series	Diane English, Joel Shukovsky, Steven Peterman, Gary Dontzig, Tom Palmer, Korby Siamis, Deborah Smith and Peter Tolan		Won	
1992	Outstanding Lead Actress in a Comedy Series	Candice Bergen as Murphy Brown	for "Birth 101"	Won	
1992	Outstanding Supporting Actor in a Comedy Series	Jay Thomas as Jerry Gold	for "Lovesick"	Nominated	
1992	Outstanding Supporting Actress in a Comedy Series	Faith Ford as Corky Sherwood	for "A Chance of Showers"	Nominated	
1992	Outstanding Individual Achievement in Directing in a Comedy Series	Barnet Kellman	for "Birth 101"	Won	
1992	Outstanding Individual Achievement in Directing in a Comedy Series	Lee Shallat-Chemel	for "Send in the Clowns"	Nominated	
1992	Outstanding Individual Achievement in Writing in a Comedy Series	Gary Dontzig and Steven Peterman	for "Come Out, Come Out, Wherever You Are"	Nominated	
1992	Outstanding Individual Achievement in Writing in a Comedy Series	Diane English and Korby Siamis	for "Uh-Oh: Part II"	Nominated	
1993	Outstanding Comedy Series	Gary Dontzig, Steven Peterman, Tom Palmer, Korby Siamis, Deborah Smith, Michael Patrick King, Peter Tolan, Ned E. Davis, Bill Diamond and Michael Saltzman		Nominated	
1993	Outstanding Lead Actress in a Comedy Series	Candice Bergen as Murphy Brown	for "Games Mothers Play"	Nominated	
1993	Outstanding Individual Achievement in Directing in a Comedy Series	Peter Bonerz	for "You Say Potatoe, I Say Potato"	Nominated	
1994	Outstanding Lead Actress in a Comedy Series	Candice Bergen as Murphy Brown	for "It's Just Like Riding a Bike"	Won	
1994	Outstanding Supporting Actress in a Comedy Series	Faith Ford as Corky Sherwood	for "The Young and the Rest of Us" + "The More Things Stay The Same"	Nominated	
1994	Outstanding Guest Actor in a Comedy Series	Martin Sheen as Nick Brody	for "Angst for the Memories"	Won	
1994	Outstanding Guest Actress in a Comedy Series	Marcia Wallace as Carol Kester - Secretary 66	for "Anything But Cured"	Nominated	
1995	Outstanding Lead Actress in a Comedy Series	Candice Bergen as Murphy Brown	for "Requiem For a Crew Guy"	Won	
1995	Outstanding Guest Actor in a Comedy Series	Robert Pastorelli as Eldin Bernecky	for "Bye, Bye Bernecky"	Nominated	
1995	Outstanding Guest Actor in a Comedy Series	Paul Reubens as Andrew J. Lansing III	for "The Good Nephew"	Nominated	
1998	Outstanding Guest Actress in a Comedy Series	Bette Midler as Caprice Feldman	for "Never Can Say Goodbye"	Nominated	

==== Creative Arts Emmy Awards ====
Year	Category	Nominee(s)	Episode(s)	Result	Ref
1989	Outstanding Art Direction for a Series	Roy Christopher and Steve Rostine	for "Soul Man"	Nominated	
1989	Outstanding Achievement in Costuming for a Series	Bill Hargate	for "Mama Said"	Nominated	
1989	Outstanding Editing for a Series – Multi-Camera Production	Jerry Davis	for "It's How You Play the Game"	Nominated	
1989	Outstanding Editing for a Series – Multi-Camera Production	Tucker Wiard	for "Respect"	Won	
1990	Outstanding Achievement in Costuming for a Series	Bill Hargate	for "Brown Like Me"	Nominated	
1990	Outstanding Editing for a Series – Multi-Camera Production	Tucker Wiard	for "The Strike"	Nominated	
1990	Outstanding Sound Mixing for a Comedy Series or a Special	John Hicks, David E. Fluhr and Rick Himot	for "The Strike"	Nominated	
1991	Outstanding Art Direction for a Series	Roy Christopher and Steve Rostine	for "Retreat"	Nominated	
1991	Outstanding Achievement in Costuming for a Series	Bill Hargate	for "Eldin Imitates Life"	Won	
1991	Outstanding Editing for a Series – Multi-Camera Production	Tucker Wiard	for "On Another Plane"	Won	
1991	Outstanding Sound Mixing for a Comedy Series or a Special	John Hicks, David E. Fluhr and Rick Himot	for "On Another Plane"	Nominated	
1992	Outstanding Editing for a Series – Multi-Camera Production	Tucker Wiard	for "Send in the Clowns"	Nominated	
1993	Outstanding Editing for a Series – Multi-Camera Production	Tucker Wiard	for "The World According to Avery"	Nominated	
1993	Outstanding Individual Achievement in Hairstyling for a Series	Judy Crown	for "A Year to Remember"	Nominated	
1993	Outstanding Individual Achievement in Makeup for a Series	Rick Stratton and Patricia Messina	for "One"	Nominated	
1994	Outstanding Editing for a Series – Multi-Camera Production	Robert Souders and Tucker Wiard	for "Socks and the Single Woman"	Nominated	
1996	Outstanding Multi-Camera Editing for a Series	Tucker Wiard	for "Up in Smoke"	Nominated	
1998	Outstanding Multi-Camera Picture Editing for a Series	Tucker Wiard	for "Opus One"	Nominated	

=== Golden Globe Awards ===
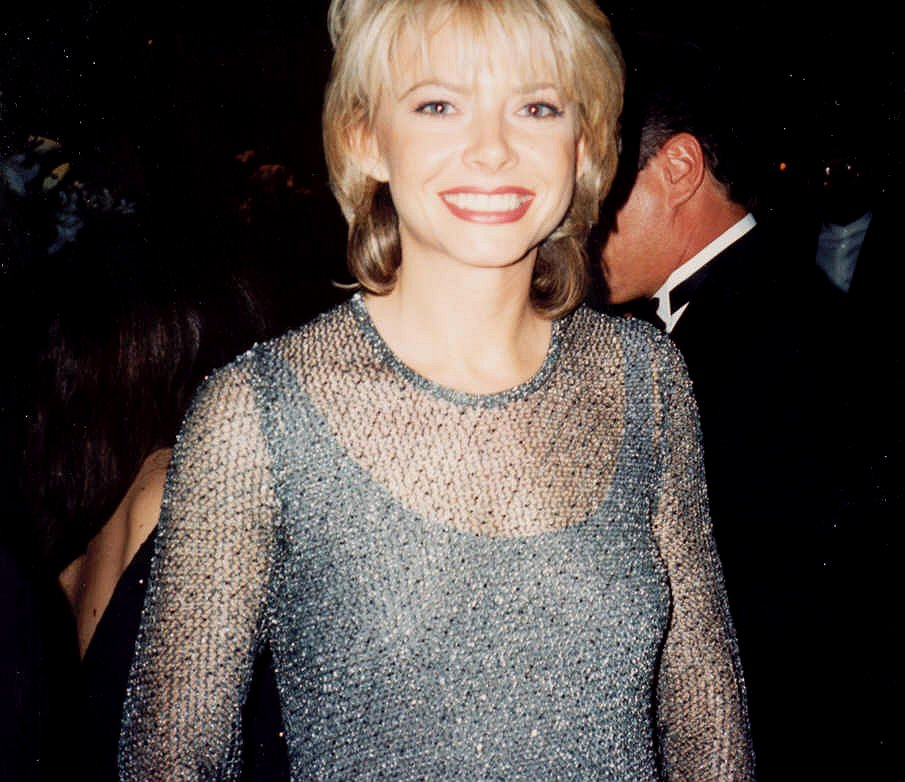
Faith Ford was twice nominated for a Golden Globe Award for her performance as Corky Sherwood.

Murphy Brown received fifteen Golden Globe Award nominations during its tenure, with two wins for Best Actress – Television Series Musical or Comedy for Candice Bergen and one win for Best Television Series – Musical or Comedy.

Year	Category	Nominee(s)	Result	Ref
1988	Best Television Series – Musical or Comedy		Nominated	
1988	Best Actress – Television Series Musical or Comedy	Candice Bergen as Murphy Brown	Won	
1989	Best Television Series – Musical or Comedy		Won	
1989	Best Actress – Television Series Musical or Comedy	Candice Bergen as Murphy Brown	Nominated	
1990	Best Television Series – Musical or Comedy		Nominated	
1990	Best Actress – Television Series Musical or Comedy	Candice Bergen as Murphy Brown	Nominated	
1990	Best Supporting Actress – Series, Miniseries or Television Film	Faith Ford as Corky Sherwood	Nominated	
1991	Best Television Series – Musical or Comedy		Nominated	
1991	Best Actress – Television Series Musical or Comedy	Candice Bergen as Murphy Brown	Won	
1991	Best Supporting Actress – Series, Miniseries or Television Film	Faith Ford as Corky Sherwood	Nominated	
1992	Best Television Series – Musical or Comedy		Nominated	
1992	Best Actress – Television Series Musical or Comedy	Candice Bergen as Murphy Brown	Nominated	
1993	Best Actress – Television Series Musical or Comedy	Candice Bergen as Murphy Brown	Nominated	
1994	Best Actress – Television Series Musical or Comedy	Candice Bergen as Murphy Brown	Nominated	
1995	Best Actress – Television Series Musical or Comedy	Candice Bergen as Murphy Brown	Nominated	
2018	Best Actress – Television Series Musical or Comedy	Candice Bergen as Murphy Brown	Nominated	

=== Online Film & Television Association Awards ===
Year	Category	Nominee(s)	Result	Ref
1997–1998	Best Actress in a Series	Candice Bergen	Nominated	
1997–1998	Best Actress in a Comedy Series	Candice Bergen	Nominated	
1997–1998	Best Episode of a Series	"Never Can Say Goodbye"	Nominated	
1997–1998	Best Episode of a Comedy Series	"Never Can Say Goodbye"	Nominated	
2010–2011	TV Hall of Fame		Won	

=== Q Awards ===
The Q Award, presented by the Viewers for Quality Television, honors programs and performers that the organization deem are of the highest quality. Out of 32 nominations, Murphy Brown won six awards, including Best Quality Comedy Series in 1991; Best Actress in a Quality Comedy Series for Candice Bergen three times from 1989 to 1991; Best Specialty Player for Scott Bakula in 1994; and Best Writing in a Quality Comedy Series in 1991.

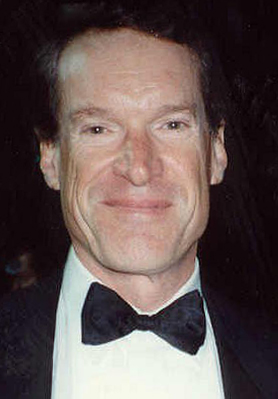
Charles Kimbrough received a Q award nomination for his performance on the series

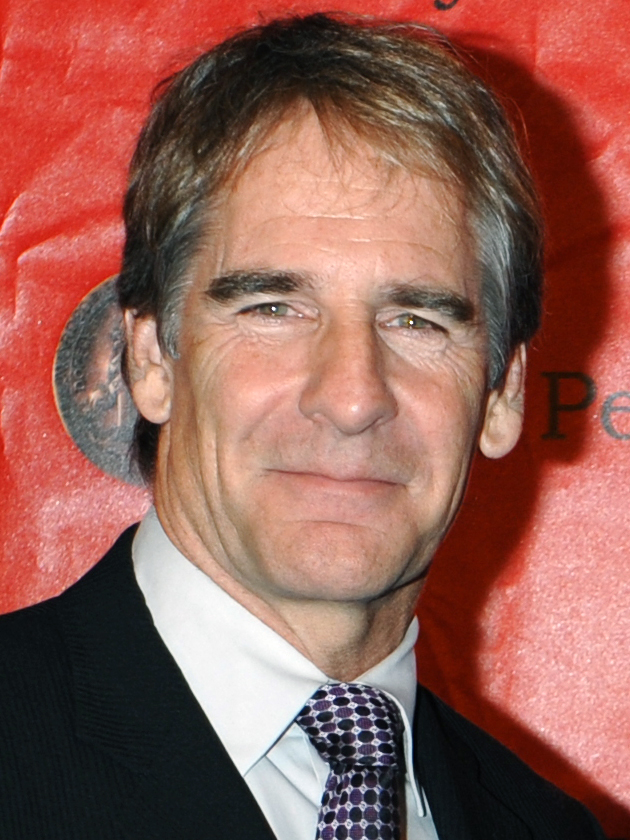
Scott Bakula won a Q award for his guest performance on the series.

Year	Category	Nominee(s)	Result	Ref
1989	Best Quality Comedy Series		2nd place	
1989	Best Actress in a Quality Comedy Series	Candice Bergen	Won	
1989	Best Supporting Actor in a Quality Comedy Series	Grant Shaud	2nd place	
1990	Best Quality Comedy Series		Nominated	
1990	Best Actress in a Quality Comedy Series	Candice Bergen	Won	
1990	Best Supporting Actor in a Quality Comedy Series	Charles Kimbrough	Nominated	
1990	Best Supporting Actor in a Quality Comedy Series	Grant Shaud	Nominated	
1990	Best Supporting Actress in a Quality Comedy Series	Faith Ford	Nominated	
1990	Best Writing in a Quality Comedy Series		Nominated	
1990	Best Directing in a Quality Comedy Series		Nominated	
1991	Best Quality Comedy Series		Won	
1991	Best Actress in a Quality Comedy Series	Candice Bergen	Won	
1991	Best Supporting Actor in a Quality Comedy Series	Robert Pastorelli	Nominated	
1991	Best Supporting Actor in a Quality Comedy Series	Grant Shaud	Nominated	
1991	Best Supporting Actress in a Quality Comedy Series	Faith Ford	Nominated	
1991	Best Writing in a Quality Comedy Series		Won	
1991	Best Specialty Player	Colleen Dewhurst	Nominated	
1992	Best Quality Comedy Series		Nominated	
1992	Best Actress in a Quality Comedy Series	Candice Bergen	Nominated	
1993	Best Quality Comedy Series		Nominated	
1993	Best Actress in a Quality Comedy Series	Candice Bergen	Nominated	
1993	Best Supporting Actor in a Quality Comedy Series	Grant Shaud	Nominated	
1993	Best Supporting Actress in a Quality Comedy Series	Faith Ford	Nominated	
1994	Best Quality Comedy Series		Nominated	
1994	Best Actress in a Quality Comedy Series	Candice Bergen	Nominated	
1994	Best Supporting Actor in a Quality Comedy Series	Grant Shaud	Nominated	
1994	Best Supporting Actress in a Quality Comedy Series	Faith Ford	Nominated	
1994	Best Specialty Player	Scott Bakula	Won	
1995	Best Actress in a Quality Comedy Series	Candice Bergen	Nominated	
1995	Best Supporting Actor in a Quality Comedy Series	Grant Shaud	Nominated	
1995	Best Specialty Player	Scott Bakula	Nominated	
1996	Best Actress in a Quality Comedy Series	Candice Bergen	Nominated	

=== Screen Actors Guild Awards ===
Murphy Brown received three Screen Actors Guild Award nominations, two for Outstanding Performance by a Female Actor in a Comedy Series for Candice Bergen and one for Outstanding Performance by an Ensemble in a Comedy Series for the cast.

Year	Category	Nominee(s)	Result	Ref
1994	Outstanding Performance by a Female Actor in a Comedy Series	Candice Bergen as Murphy Brown	Nominated	
1994	Outstanding Performance by an Ensemble in a Comedy Series	Candice Bergen, Pat Corley, Faith Ford, Charles Kimbrough, Joe Regalbuto, Grant Shaud	Nominated	
1995	Outstanding Performance by a Female Actor in a Comedy Series	Candice Bergen as Murphy Brown	Nominated	

=== Television Critics Association Awards ===
During its tenure, Murphy Brown received four TCA Award nominations for Outstanding Achievement in Comedy, winning twice.

Year	Category	Nominee(s)	Result	Ref
1989	Outstanding Achievement in Comedy		Won	
1990	Outstanding Achievement in Comedy		Nominated	
1991	Outstanding Achievement in Comedy		Won	
1992	Outstanding Achievement in Comedy		Nominated	

=== TV Land Awards ===
The TV Land Award is an award presented at the eponymous award ceremony, airing on TV Land, that honors television programs that are off air. Receiving five nominations since the first award ceremony, Murphy Brown won an award for TV Moment That Became Headline News.

Year	Category	Nominee(s)	Result	Ref
2003	Most Memorable Male Guest Star in a Comedy as himself	Dan Quayle	Nominated	
2005	Classic TV Broadcaster of the Year	Candice Bergen	Nominated	
2006	Classic TV Broadcaster of the Year	Candice Bergen	Nominated	
2007	TV Moment That Became Headline News	Candice Bergen (For Murphy Brown's single mother showdown with Dan Quayle)	Won	
2008	Broadcaster(s) of the Year	Candice Bergen, Faith Ford, Charles Kimbrough and Joe Regalbuto	Nominated	

=== Writers Guild of America Awards ===
Presented by the Writers Guild of America (WGA), the Writers Guild of America Award is an annual accolade that recognizes outstanding achievement of writers in film, television, radio, promotional writing and videogames. Murphy Brown received 4 nominations of for the award for Television: Episodic Comedy, winning twice in 1991 and 1993.

Year	Category	Nominee(s)	Episode(s)	Result	Ref
1989	Television: Episodic Comedy	Diane English	for "Respect"	Nominated	
1990	Television: Episodic Comedy	Diane English	for "Brown Like Me"	Won	
1992	Television: Episodic Comedy	Korby Siamis and Diane English	for "Uh-Oh: Part II"	Won	
1998	Television: Episodic Comedy	Diane English	for "Never Can Say Goodbye"	Nominated	

=== Other awards ===
Award	Year of ceremony	Category	Nominee(s)	Result	Ref
ACE Eddie Awards	1993	Best Edited Half Hour Series for Television	Tucker Wiard for "Send in the Clowns"	Nominated	
ACE Eddie Awards	1994	Best Edited Half Hour Series for Television	Tucker Wiard for "Angst for the Memories"	Nominated	
American Television Awards	1993	Best Situation Comedy		Nominated	
American Television Awards	1993	Best Actress in a Situation Comedy	Candice Bergen	Nominated	
American Television Awards	1993	Best Supporting Actress in a Situation Comedy	Faith Ford	Nominated	
Humanitas Prize	1994	30 Minute Category	Rob Bragin	Won	
Humanitas Prize	1998	30 Minute Category	Marilyn Suzanne Miller	Won	
Peabody Award	1991	CBS, Shukovsky/English Productions, Warner Brothers Television, Burbank, California		Won	
Youth Artist Awards	1989	Best Young Actress in a Featured, Co-Starring, Supporting, Recurring Role in a Comedy, Drama Series, or Special	Chelsea Hertford	Nominated	
Youth Artist Awards	1998	Best Performance in a TV Comedy Series: Young Actor Age Ten or Under	Haley Joel Osment	Nominated	
