= The Women (2008 film) =

2008 film by Diane English

- Theatrical release poster
- Directed by: Diane English
- Written by: Diane English
- Based on: The Women; 1936 play by Clare Boothe Luce The Women; 1939 film by: Anita Loos; Jane Murfin
- Produced by: Diane English; Mick Jagger; Bill Johnson; Victoria Pearman
- Starring: Meg Ryan; Annette Bening; Eva Mendes; Debra Messing; Jada Pinkett Smith; Carrie Fisher; Cloris Leachman; Debi Mazar; Bette Midler; Candice Bergen
- Cinematography: Anastas N. Michos
- Edited by: Tia Nolan
- Music by: Mark Isham
- Production companies: New Line Cinema; Picturehouse; Inferno Distribution; Double Edged Entertainment; Jagged Films; Shukovsky English Entertainment
- Distributed by: Warner Bros. Pictures
- Release dates: September 4, 2008 (Westwood premiere); September 12, 2008 (United States)
- Running time: 114 minutes
- Country: United States
- Language: English
- Budget: $16 million
- Box office: $50 million

The Women is a 2008 American comedy-drama film written, produced and directed by Diane English. It stars an ensemble cast including Meg Ryan, Annette Bening, Eva Mendes, Debra Messing, Jada Pinkett Smith, Carrie Fisher, Cloris Leachman, Debi Mazar, Bette Midler, and Candice Bergen. The screenplay is an updated version of the 1939 film of the same name based on a 1936 play by Clare Boothe Luce and follows a wealthy New York woman (Ryan) whose seemingly perfect life unravels when she discovers her husband’s infidelity, leading her and her circle of friends to reevaluate their identities.

The film was shot in New York City and Massachusetts, with no men appearing on screen, just like George Cukor's 1939 version. The Women was widely panned by critics for lacking the wit and charm of the original, though some praised its craftsmanship. Despite the mostly negative reviews, it became a moderate box-office success, eventually grossing $50 million worldwide, split evenly between domestic and international markets. While her performance in the film earned Mendes a Best Actress nomination at the 11th ALMA Awards, the main cast received several negative honors, including Razzie Award nominations for Worst Actress for each of the leading actresses.

== Plot ==
Clothing designer Mary Haines lives in a beautiful suburban Connecticut home with her wealthy financier husband Stephen and their 11-year-old daughter Molly. Her best friend since college, Sylvie Fowler, is the editor of a prominent fashion magazine that dictates the latest in taste and style for New York City fashionistas. When Sylvie learns from chatty manicurist Tanya that Stephen is having an affair with Crystal, a perfume salesgirl in Saks Fifth Avenue, she confides in the ever-pregnant Edie Cohen but hesitates to tell Mary, who discovers the news from the same woman after getting a manicure herself. Despite her mother Catherine's exhortation to keep quiet about what she knows, Mary confronts Crystal first, in a lingerie store, and then Stephen, before asking for a divorce.

Sylvie, Edie, and writer Alex Fisher join forces to support their spurned friend, but complications arise when Sylvie, facing the loss of her job, conspires with local gossip columnist Bailey Smith by confirming Mary's marital woes in exchange for Bailey contributing a celebrity profile to the magazine. Mary is stunned by Sylvie's betrayal and ends their friendship. Mary's daughter begins to ditch school and confides in Sylvie because her mother, distracted by the upheavals in her once idyllic life, becomes more distant.

Mary is fired from her job by her father, has a makeover, and decides to open her own clothing design firm with some financial assistance from Catherine. As she begins to get her life in order, she makes an effort to bond with Molly, who reveals her father's relationship with Crystal is unraveling, and reunites with Sylvie, who has quit her job. With this knowledge in hand, Mary sets out to repair her fractured marriage as she prepares to unveil her new line of womenswear in a fashion show attended not only by boutique owners but the buyer from Saks as well.

Sylvie tells Mary that she has met a guy and is thinking of giving him her real phone number. Edie's water breaks and she has a baby boy. Mary receives a call from her husband and is encouraged by the others to answer it; she then arranges a date with him. In the end, we see that a magazine titled Sylvie is published with the four friends on the cover and Alex's book is out. A hint is given about Crystal's possibly going out with Alex's ex-girlfriend Natasha. The women talk about the magazine, the book, and the joys, heartaches, and uniquely special triumphs of being a woman.

== Cast ==
- Meg Ryan as Mary Haines
- Annette Bening as Sylvie Fowler
- Eva Mendes as Crystal Allen
- Debra Messing as Edie Cohen
- Jada Pinkett Smith as Alex Fisher
- Bette Midler as Leah Miller
- Candice Bergen as Catherine Frazier, Mary's mother
- Carrie Fisher as Bailey Smith
- Cloris Leachman as Maggie
- Debi Mazar as Tanya
- India Ennenga as Molly Haines, Mary's daughter
- Jill Flint as Annie
- Ana Gasteyer as Pat
- Joanna Gleason as Barbara Delacorte
- Tilly Scott Pedersen as Uta
- Lynn Whitfield as Glenda Hill
- Natasha Alam as Natasha
- Christy Scott Cashman as Jean

== Production ==
In The Women: The Legacy, a bonus feature on the DVD release of the film, Diane English discusses her 15-year struggle to bring a contemporary version of the 1939 classic film to the screen. She wanted to present a version in which the female characters were strong and self-reliant and supported and defended each other rather than resort to treachery and catty remarks to achieve their goals. Because the concept of women going to Reno in search of a divorce is archaic, she needed to eliminate this aspect of the original plot from her treatment, which necessitated deleting several characters from the story. One character that is not in its original form is Lucy, who in the play and original movie runs the ranch in Reno; in this version, she is seen as Mary's dog.

English wrote the first screenplay in 1993 during hiatus from Murphy Brown. The following year, Julia Roberts and Meg Ryan agreed to co-produce and star, with James L. Brooks as director and a supporting cast that included Blythe Danner, Marisa Tomei, Debi Mazar, and Candice Bergen. In 1996, the first table reading of the script was held at Sony Pictures. Despite the enthusiasm of everyone involved, the project stalled amid rumors that Roberts and Ryan wanted to play the same role. English spent the following year revising the screenplay, during which time Brooks dropped out to direct As Good as It Gets. Roberts also lost interest. English entertained the idea of directing the film herself in 2001. Over the next few years, Sandra Bullock, Ashley Judd, Uma Thurman, Whitney Houston, and Queen Latifah were among those to express interest, but none were attached officially.

After being turned down by every major Hollywood studio, English developed the project as an independent film and approached Victoria Pearman, the president of Jagged Films, singer Mick Jagger's production company, who agreed to produce the film for Picturehouse. Pearman offered some plot suggestions, and English put the finishing touches on the seventh and final draft of the script. Upon the film's completion, it was shown to executives at Warner Bros. Pictures, which had absorbed Picturehouse in the interim. Unimpressed, they put the film on the back burner until the box-office success of Sex and the City convinced them there was an audience for an all-female film.

The film was shot on location in New York City and various cities in Massachusetts. As with the play and 1939 film, English was careful to make sure no men appear on screen, even in long shots and crowd scenes. The only male character in the film is Edie's baby boy, born in the final scene of the film.

== Reception ==
=== Box office ===
Despite the mostly negative reviews, the film was a moderate box-office success. On its opening weekend, the film earned $10,115,210, ranking fourth behind Righteous Kill, The Family That Preys, and Burn After Reading. The film eventually grossed $26,902,075 in the U.S. and $23,105,471 in other markets for a total worldwide box office of $50,007,546.

=== Critical reception ===
The film received a significant negative response from critics. It holds a 13% approval rating on Rotten Tomatoes based on 147 reviews, with an average rating of 3.9/10. The critical consensus states: "The Women is a toothless remake of the 1939 classic, lacking the charm, wit and compelling protagonists of the original." Metacritic, which uses a weighted average, assigned the film a score of 27 out of 100, based on 32 critics, indicating "generally unfavorable" reviews.

Roger Ebert of the Chicago Sun-Times was one of the few critics who enjoyed the film. He awarded it three out of four stars and commented,

What a pleasure this movie is, showcasing actresses I've admired for a long time, all at the top of their form... Diane English focuses on story and character, and even in a movie that sometimes plays like an infomercial for Saks Fifth Avenue, we find ourselves intrigued by these women. The Women isn't a great movie, but how could it be? Too many characters and too much melodrama for that, and the comedy has to be somewhat muted to make the characters semi-believable. But as a well-crafted, well-written and well-acted entertainment, it drew me in and got its job done.

A.O. Scott of The New York Times called the film "a witless, straining mess" and added,

You wait in vain for a moment of snappy repartee, of fresh emotion, of grace or charm or pathos...If The Women had managed to give its various impulses some kind of coherent shape or tone, it might be worth arguing about. As it is, the movie wanders and wallows, stumbling toward screwball before veering in the direction of weepiness and grasping at satirical urbanity along the way...Rarely has class struggle, or catfighting, for that matter, been so tediously waged. And rarely have so many fine actresses been enlisted in such a futile cause.

Kenneth Turan of the Los Angeles Times observed,

While the original film...saw itself as a catty entertainment about New York society women coping with the infidelity of the husband of one of their friends, English has something grander and more complex in mind...This version sees itself as both a farce and a manifesto, a glorification of female friendship and a celebration of women's need for self-realization...All that would be a handful to pull off for the most experienced filmmaker, but English has never directed before, and it shows. The visual choices she makes in The Women are invariably static, and except for whatever energy the performers can manage, the storytelling has a dispiriting flatness to it...The film becomes unfocused as it stumbles over all the points it wants to make. Given English's writing skills, the dialogue doesn't help as much as it should, tending too much toward one-liners that aim for raunchy whenever possible. Never particularly believable, the story quickly unravels into schematic contrivance and wish-fulfillment fantasy.

David Wiegand of the San Francisco Chronicle wrote,

English doesn't make much of it very enjoyable. She's so careful to resist the Neanderthal sensibilities of the original film, she often neglects to make her version of the story, well, fun. Worse, it's only occasionally believable...Even those who never saw Cukor's movie will feel something is missing in English's version. Yes, some of what's missing is humor and snappy dialogue, but that could be forgiven, if only some of the characters were more believable and the direction not quite as uneven. English knows how to get good performances out of her cast, but her pacing is languid and sloppy, so much so that one is tempted to believe that for all she knows about pacing a 30-minute sitcom, English isn't quite ready to tackle the longer form.

Peter Travers of Rolling Stone rated the film one out of four stars, calling it a "misbegotten redo" and "a major dud." He added, "Everyone...struggles with a script that resists being crowbarred into the 21st century." Richard Schickel of Time called the film "one of the worst movies I've ever seen."

=== Accolades ===
Meg Ryan, Annette Bening, Eva Mendes, Debra Messing and Jada Pinkett Smith each garnered a Razzie Award nomination for Worst Actress.

== Home media ==
The film was released on DVD on December 19, 2008, in the U.S. and 19 March 2009 in the UK.
