= Joel Shukovsky =

American television producer

- Occupation: Television producer
- Spouse: Diane English (m. 1977; div. 2010)

Joel Shukovsky is an American television producer. He won two Primetime Emmy Awards and was nominated for two more in the categories Outstanding Comedy Series for his work on the television program Murphy Brown.

In addition to his Primetime Emmy Awards, he produced for television programs such as The Louie Show, Double Rush and Love & War. In 2011, he wrote a column for The Huffington Post.
