= The Women (play) =

1936 play by Clare Boothe Luce

- Random House 1937, First edition cover
- Written by: Clare Boothe Luce
- Characters: Mary (Mrs. Haines); Crystal Allen; Sylvia (Mrs. Fowler); Peggy (Mrs. Day); Nancy Blake; Edith (Mrs. Potter); Mrs. Morehead; Countess De Lage
- Series: 1939 Broadway; 1939 film version; 1956 musical comedy film version; 1973 Broadway revival; 2001 Broadway revival; 2008 film version
- Genre: Comedy of manners
- Setting: New York and Reno

Premiere
- Date: December 26, 1936
- Place: Ethel Barrymore Theatre

The Women is a 1936 American play, a comedy of manners by Clare Boothe Luce. Only women compose the cast.

The original Broadway production, directed by Robert B. Sinclair, opened on December 26, 1936, at the Ethel Barrymore Theatre, where it ran for 657 performances with an all-female cast that included Margalo Gillmore, Ilka Chase, Betty Lawford, Jessie Busley, Phyllis Povah, Marjorie Main, and Arlene Francis.

== Synopsis ==
The play is a commentary on the pampered lives and power struggles of various wealthy Manhattan socialites and up-and-coming women and the gossip that propels and damages their relationships. While men frequently are the subject of their lively discussions and drive the action on-stage, they never are seen or heard.

== Production ==
Following a premiere December 7, 1936, at the Forrest Theatre in Philadelphia, The Women opened December 26, 1936, at the Ethel Barrymore Theatre in New York City. Produced by Max Gordon, the original Broadway production was directed by Robert B. Sinclair with settings by Jo Mielziner and costumes by John Hambleton.

The play was revived on Broadway in 1973 at the 46th Street Theatre, running April 25-June 17, with 63 performances. It was directed by Morton Da Costa, with scenic design by Oliver Smith, costume design by Ann Roth, and lighting design by John Gleason. Other supporting staff included: production stage manager Victor Straus; stage managers Nick Malekos and Suzanne Egan; costume supervisor Ray Diffen; press representatives Shirley Herz and Stuart Fink.

A second revival opened November 8, 2001, at the American Airlines Theatre and closed January 13, 2002, after 77 performances. Production staff included Director Scott Elliott, with assisting direction by Marie Masters; production stage manager Peter Hanson; stage manager Valerie A. Peterson; scenic designer Derek McLane; costume designer Isaac Mizrahi; lighting designer Brian MacDevitt; and sound designer Douglas J. Cuomo. Jeff Francis did hair design, and Gary Arave designed the wigs.

== Cast ==
Role	Production				
Role	1936 Broadway	1939 film	1973 revival	2001 revival	2008 film
Sylvia Fowler	Ilka Chase	Rosalind Russell	Alexis Smith	Kristen Johnston	Annette Bening
Mary Haines	Margalo Gillmore	Norma Shearer	Kim Hunter	Cynthia Nixon	Meg Ryan
Crystal Allen	Betty Lawford	Joan Crawford	Marie Wallace	Jennifer Tilly	Eva Mendes
Little Mary	Charita Bauer	Virginia Weidler	Cynthia Lister	Hallie Kate Eisenberg	—N/a
Mrs. Morehead	Jessie Busley	Lucile Watson	Myrna Loy	Mary Louise Wilson	—N/a
Miss Watts	Virgilia Chew	Ruth Hussey	Leora Dana	Susan Bruce	—N/a
Miriam Aarons	Audrey Christie	Paulette Goddard	Rhonda Fleming	Lynn Collins	—N/a
Countess de Lage	Margaret Douglas	Mary Boland	Jan Miner	Rue McClanahan	—N/a
Lucy	Marjorie Main	Marjorie Main	Polly Rowles	Julie Halston	—N/a
Peggy Day	Adrienne Marden	Joan Fontaine	Marian Hailey	Amy Ryan	—N/a
Miss Trimmerback	Mary Murray	Mary Beth Hughes	Elizabeth Perry	Ann Talman	—N/a
Nancy Blake	Jane Seymour	Florence Nash	Mary Louise Wilson	Lisa Emery	—N/a
Jane	Ann Teeman	Muriel Hutchison	Regina Ress	Heather Matarazzo	—N/a
Maggie	Mary Cecil	Mary Cecil	—N/a	Mary Bond Davis	Cloris Leachman
Princess Tamara	Arlene Francis	—N/a	Jeanne DeBaer	Roxanna Hope	—N/a
Helene	Arlene Francis	—N/a	Caryll Coan	Roxanne Hope	—N/a
Mrs. Wagstaff	Ethel Jackson	—N/a	Camila Ashland	Barbara Marineau	—N/a
Edith Potter	Phyllis Povah	Phyllis Povah	Dorothy Loudon	Jennifer Coolidge	—N/a
Sadie	Marjorie Wood	—N/a	Camila Ashland	Cheryl Stern	—N/a

== Adaptations ==
=== Film ===
The 1939 film version was directed by George Cukor and starred Norma Shearer and Joan Crawford. Supporting cast included Rosalind Russell, Paulette Goddard, Joan Fontaine and Mary Boland.

In 1956, the story was made into a musical film titled The Opposite Sex, starring June Allyson and Joan Collins.

Diane English co-wrote and directed the 2008 remake that was in development for 15 years. It starred Meg Ryan, Annette Bening, Eva Mendes, Debra Messing, Jada Pinkett Smith, Carrie Fisher, Cloris Leachman, Debi Mazar, Bette Midler, and Candice Bergen.

=== Television ===
On February 7, 1955, the NBC anthology drama series Producers' Showcase broadcast an adaptation of the play, starring Ruth Hussey as Mary. Paulette Goddard and Mary Boland, who had each appeared in the 1939 film, also appeared in this production, as Sylvia Fowler and the Countess, respectively. Shelley Winters played the part of Crystal Allen, while Mary Astor portrayed Nancy Blake and Bibi Osterwald was Edith Potter.

On June 18, 2002, the PBS anthology theatre series Stage on Screen broadcast a recording of the 2001 Broadway revival.

== Awards and nominations ==
=== 2001 Revival ===
Year	Award	Category	Nominee	Result
2002	Drama Desk Awards	Outstanding Featured Actress in a Play	Jennifer Coolidge	Nominated
2002	Drama Desk Awards	Outstanding Set Design in a Play	Derek McLane	Nominated
2002	Drama Desk Awards	Outstanding Costume Design	Isaac Mizrahi	Won
