= Robert Pastorelli =

American actor (1954–2004)

- Born: June 21, 1954; New Brunswick, New Jersey, U.S.
- Died: March 8, 2004 (aged 49); Hollywood Hills, California, U.S.
- Occupation: Actor
- Years active: 1977–2004
- Partner: Charemon Jonovich
- Children: 2

Robert Joseph Pastorelli (June 21, 1954 – March 8, 2004) was an American actor.

After he acquired a reputation as a skilled character actor in the 1980s and 1990s, Pastorelli's career went into decline after the death of his girlfriend under mysterious circumstances at his home in 1999. He died of a narcotic overdose in 2004. He was best known as Eldin in Murphy Brown (1988–1994), Johnny C. in Eraser (1996), and Hughey in Michael (1996).

== Early life ==
Pastorelli was born in New Brunswick, New Jersey, the son of Ledo ("Tally") Pastorelli, an insurance salesman and Dorothy ("Dottie"), an artist. His sister, Gwen Pastorelli, is an opera singer and a real estate agent.

He spent his childhood years in Edison, New Jersey, graduating from Edison High School in 1972. He initially intended a career as a professional boxer, but had to abandon the sport due to injuries sustained in a near-fatal high-speed car crash at the age of 19. Pastorelli claimed he had a near death incident at this time, and experienced a vision of himself from above in the hospital while his father sat at the bedside overcome with grief.

He acquired a narcotic habit in his early twenties prior to his acting career. He maintained sobriety intermittently but would relapse into drug misuse on several occasions.

== Theater career ==
He entered the acting profession via New York City theater in the late 1970s after studying at the New York Academy of Theatrical Arts and the Actors Studio, financially maintaining himself by working as a bartender and a male exotic dancer. In 1977 he made his stage debut in a production of Rebel Without a Cause. He also performed in productions of The Rainmaker, and Death of a Salesman. Later in his career he performed at London's South Bank theater in A Streetcar Named Desire in 2002.

== Hollywood ==
In 1982 Pastorelli headed west to Los Angeles seeking opportunities in Hollywood. Spending the early 1980s employed in television bit-part appearances, he found a niche playing streetwise characters, appearing also in supporting roles in the cinema films Outrageous Fortune (1987) and Beverly Hills Cop II (1987). His first substantial cinematic role came with Dances with Wolves (1990). His big break in television came with the role of the gruff but lovable house painter Eldin Bernecky on the series Murphy Brown, which was a ratings hit, and he stayed with the show for seven seasons from 1988 to 1994. Murphy Brown producer Diane English was sufficiently impressed with his abilities that she worked with him to produce his first starring vehicle, the television sitcom Double Rush, which lasted one season in 1995. Two years later, he starred in the American adaptation of the British detective series Cracker (1997–1999).

As his television career gained momentum Pastorelli's opportunities in cinema roles increased. He appeared in the comedy Sister Act 2: Back in the Habit (1993); played a demented serial killer in the 1993 thriller Striking Distance; a significant supporting role in the action film Eraser (1996); and parts in fantasy film Michael (1996), and horror-comedy flick Modern Vampires (1998).

== Charemon Jonovich shooting ==
On the evening of March 15, 1999, Pastorelli's 25-year-old girlfriend Charemon Jonovich was killed by a gunshot to the head. The incident happened at Pastorelli’s home.

During the police investigation, Pastorelli testified how in the midst of an argument between the two of them, Jonovich suddenly produced a handgun and killed herself. The Los Angeles Department of Coroner declared the manner of death undetermined (i.e., not clearly suicide, homicide or accident).

== Final years ==
Pastorelli was never charged criminally or blamed by authorities for any responsibility for Charemon Jonovich's death. He received public expressions of sympathy within Hollywood and from the Los Angeles media, but his career went into noticeable decline afterwards. He appeared in two more small cinematic roles in the early 2000s and also had a few TV appearances. He developed a friendship with Glenn Close towards the end of his career, and appeared alongside her in the television films The Ballad of Lucy Whipple, and in South Pacific in 2001. In 2002, Pastorelli again appeared alongside Close at London's Royal National Theatre in a performance of Tennessee Williams' A Streetcar Named Desire. In 2002, he co-founded the Garden State Film Festival. His posthumous final screen appearance was in the film Be Cool (2005).

== Death ==
Pastorelli was found dead at the age of 49 at his home in the Hollywood Hills on March 8, 2004, from a narcotics overdose. The Coroner's Office reported Pastorelli died of a "fatal blood concentration of morphine". Pastorelli's body was interred in the mausoleum at Saint Catharine's Cemetery in Sea Girt, New Jersey.

== Filmography ==
=== Film ===
Year	Title	Role	Notes
1987	Outrageous Fortune	Dealer #2	
1987	Beverly Hills Cop II	Vinnie	
1988	Memories of Me	Al "Broccoli"	
1990	Dances with Wolves	Timmons	
1992	FernGully: The Last Rainforest	Tony	Voice
1992	The Paint Job	Willie	
1992	Folks!	Fred	
1993	Striking Distance	Jimmy Detillo	
1993	Sister Act 2: Back in the Habit	Joey Bustamente	
1996	Eraser	Johnny C	
1996	Michael	Huey Driscoll	
1997	A Simple Wish	Oliver Greening	
1998	Scotch and Milk	The Skipper	
1998	Heist	T-Bone	
2000	Bait	Jaster	
2005	Be Cool	Joe Loop	Posthumous release; (final film role)

=== Television ===
Year	Title	Role	Notes
1982	Barney Miller	Edward Guthrie	Episode: "Altercation"
1982–1983	Cagney & Lacey	Rosen / Cop #2	2 episodes
1983	St. Elsewhere	Danny Christiano	Episode: "Graveyard"
1983	Tucker's Witch	Stanley	Episode: "Murder Is the Key"
1983	Diner	Turko	Television film
1983	Hardcastle and McCormick	Adler	Episode: "The Black Widow"
1983	Knight Rider	Leroy	Episode: "Custom K.I.T.T."
1983–1985	Hill Street Blues	Bobby Stellin / Jimmy Frumento	2 episodes
1983–1985	Newhart	Biker / Prisoner	2 episodes
1984	I Married a Centerfold	Guard	Television film
1984	T. J. Hooker	2nd Rapist – Dancer	Episode: "The Confession"
1985	Simon & Simon	Ken	Episode: "Almost Foolproof"
1985	Hunter	Willie Wakefield	"The Avenging Angel"
1985	Berrenger's	Bernie	Episode: "Hidden Agenda"
1985	California Girls	Mechanic	Television film
1985	Braker	Forensic Specialist	Television film
1985	Santa Barbara	Cabbie	Episode: "#1.238"
1985	The Twilight Zone	Man	Episode: "Dead Woman's Shoes"
1985	The A-Team	Juarez's Hechman	Episode: "There Goes the Neighborhood"
1985–1986	Mary	Mr. Yummy	2 episodes
1985–1986	Remington Steele	Weasel	2 episodes
1986	Too Close for Comfort	Vic Paradies	Episode: "Monroe's Critical Condition"
1986	Throb	The Host	Episode: "Bus of Dreams"
1987	Miami Vice	Vespa	Episode: "Down for the Count"
1987	MacGyver	Arnie	Episode: "Out in the Cold"
1987	Hands of a Stranger	Handyman	Television film
1987	The Spirit	Uncredited	Television film
1987	CBS Summer Playhouse	Vinnie Vingo	Episode: "Sons of Gunz"
1987	Private Eye	Villanova	Episode: "Blue Movie"
1987	The Law and Harry McGraw	Louie The Lip Birdsall	Episode: "Rappaport's Back in Town"
1987	Night Court	Lorenzo Amador	Episode: "Let It Snow"
1987–1988	Beauty and the Beast	Vick Ramos / Tony Perotta	2 episodes
1988	Lady Mobster	Matteo Villani	Television film
1988	My Sister Sam	Robert Celli	Episode: "It's My Party and I'll Kill If I Want To"
1988–1998	Murphy Brown	Eldin Bernecky	Series regular (158 episodes); Nominated — Primetime Emmy Award for Outstanding Guest Actor in a Comedy Series (1995)
1991	An Evening at the Improv	Himself (Host)	Episode: "#8.4"
1993	Basic Values: Sex, Shock & Censorship in the 90's	Jesus (segment "The Last Supper")	Television film
1993	Harmful Intent	Devil O'Shea	Television film
1994	The Yarn Princess	Jake Thomas	Television film
1994	Batman: The Animated Series	Manny	Voice, episode: "Riddler's Reform"
1995	The West Side Waltz	Sookie Cerullo	Television film
1995	Double Rush	Johnny Verona	Series regular (13 episodes)
1997	Happily Ever After: Fairy Tales for Every Child	Sergeant Louie	Voice, episode: "Mother Goose: A Rappin' and Rhymin' Special"
1997–1999	Cracker: Mind Over Murder	Gerry "Fitz" Fitzgerald	Main role (16 episodes)
1998	Modern Vampires	The Count	Television film
2001	The Ballad of Lucy Whipple	Clyde Claymore	Television film
2001	South Pacific	Luther Billis	Television film
2002	Women vs. Men	Nick	Television film
2002	Touched by an Angel	Joe Collette	Episode: "A Rock and a Hard Place"
2003	Partners and Crime	Unknown Role	Television film
2003	Hack	Lewis Bernard	Episode: "Blind Faith"

== See also ==
- List of people who died on the toilet
- Toilet-related injuries and deaths
