= Double Rush =

1995 American television series

- Genre: Sitcom
- Created by: Diane English; Stephen Nathan
- Directed by: Michael Lembeck
- Starring: Robert Pastorelli; David Arquette; Corinne Bohrer; Adam Goldberg; D.L. Hughley; Phil Leeds; Sam Lloyd
- Country of origin: United States
- Original language: English
- No. of seasons: 1
- No. of episodes: 13 (1 unaired)

Production
- Executive producers: Diane English, Stephen Nathan
- Producer: Diane English
- Running time: ca. 25 minutes
- Production companies: Shukovsky English Entertainment; Warner Bros. Television

Original release
- Network: CBS
- Release: January 4 – April 12, 1995

The cast of Double Rush. From left: D. L. Hughley, Phil Leeds, Adam Goldberg, Robert Pastorelli, Sam Lloyd, Corrinne Bohrer, and David Arquette.

Double Rush is an American sitcom that aired on CBS from January 4 to April 12, 1995. The series stars Robert Pastorelli as the owner and manager of a bicycle messenger service in New York City.

== Synopsis ==
As a young man in the 1960s, Johnny Verona had hoped to become a rock star. To earn the money he needed to buy a guitar previously owned by his idol, Jimi Hendrix, that he saw in a store window, he took a job as a bicycle messenger for Ed Foley Couriers. After buying the guitar, he joined a rock band in 1968 which enjoyed some success playing in clubs. When a record company offered him a solo contract in 1971, the idealistic Johnny turned it down because the contract did not include his fellow band members.

Denied his dream of being a rock music star, Johnny used the knowledge he had acquired as a bicycle courier to open his own bicycle delivery company in Manhattan. Called Double Rush, it offers a rush delivery service, guaranteeing delivery within 45 minutes, and a "double rush" service which promises delivery within 20 minutes. Johnny goes through ups and downs as he struggles to run the company in the face of competition from the increased use of fax machines and the internet in the mid-1990s, as well as from his former employer Ed Foley Couriers, now run by Ed Foley and his daughter Kate. His young employees constantly remind Johnny of his missed chance to be a rock star in the 1970s, and he is prone to musing about it. A gruff but soft-hearted and fatherly man, he takes an interest in the personal lives and well-being of his employees at Double Rush.

Working for Johnny are the flighty, whiny, and neurotic Zoe Fuller, who could not find employment after graduating from Harvard Business School and during the first episode accepts a position as a bicycle messenger and bookkeeper with the company until she can find a better job; Barkley, the overqualified, cynical, spaced-out, wild-haired dispatcher, who wears extremely thick eyeglasses and dispenses philosophical advice as well as delivery assignments; Hunter, a dim-witted daredevil who takes great pleasure in speeding through Midtown Manhattan traffic on his bicycle and is the fastest courier at Double Rush; "The Kid," a 75-year-old prone to joking about his sex life and lack of direction in life who has 58 years of experience as a messenger, never uses a bicycle, and always delivers messages on foot, making up for his painful lack of physical speed by knowing every shortcut in New York City; and bicycle messengers Leo and Marlon. Leo, a former juvenile delinquent, is a naive, self-centered, morose, and cynical Generation Xer, while Marlon is a young husband and father who tries to balance his family life with his bicycle messenger job and has a knack for conning people.

== Cast ==
- Robert Pastorelli as Johnny Verona
- David Arquette as Hunter
- Corinne Bohrer as Zoe Fuller
- Adam Goldberg as Leo
- D.L. Hughley as Marlon
- Phil Leeds as "The Kid"
- Sam Lloyd as Barkley
- Richard Portnow as Ed Foley (recurring)
- Sarah Nelson as Kate Foley (recurring)

== Production ==
After seven seasons portraying house painter Eldin Bernecky on Murphy Brown from 1988 to 1994, Robert Pastorelli left the series to star in his own show, Double Rush. Diane English and Stephen Nathan co-created the show, and were its executive producers. Michael Lembeck directed its episodes. Spike Jonze filmed the opening credits sequence.

== Reception ==
In a January 3, 1995, review in Variety, Todd Everett described Double Rush as an "amiable new sitcom" which lacked originality because of its obvious similarities to Taxi and Cheers, and which had a collection of characters familiar to television viewers; for example, he noted that the Zoe Fuller character bore a strong resemblance to Diane Chambers on Cheers. Everett described Lembeck as a canny director and the writing of the first episode as skillful in its development of characters without overcrowding the plot, but doubted Double Rush′s ability to succeed in the same time slot as ABC′s Roseanne.

On January 4, 1995, Scott D. Pierce wrote in the Deseret News that Double Rush was an obvious attempt to reach a Generation X audience that came across as a pale imitation of Taxi and was "lifeless," "strangely flat and unfunny." He described the actors as seeming to say their lines and wait for laughter rather than coming across as believable characters.

Writing in the Tampa Bay Times on January 4, 1995, Monica Yant described Double Rush as "equal parts MTV Sports and Taxi." She praised Pastorelli's portrayal of Eldin on Murphy Brown and expressed the opinion that Pastorelli could have succeeded in a starring vehicle of his own if it was a Murphy Brown spinoff centered around his Eldin character. She found Double Rush an odd way to give him his own show because, unlike Eldin, the Johnny Verona character had "about as much zest as dishwater" and did not allow Pastorelli to display his talents. Instead, she felt that Pastorelli failed to stand out among an ensemble cast that seemed able to carry the show without him.

== Broadcast history ==
Double Rush premiered on January 4, 1995, airing on CBS on Wednesdays at 9:00 p.m. Eastern Time. Facing stiff competition in its time slot from ABC′s Roseanne, it drew low ratings, and after its fifth episode aired on February 1, 1995, it went into hiatus. It returned to the air with its sixth episode, broadcast on Monday, March 6, 1995, before settling two days later into its new time slot, Wednesdays at 8:30 p.m. Eastern Time, with its new lead-in being the premiering The George Wendt Show. Ratings remained poor, and its run ended with its twelfth episode on April 12, 1995. Its thirteenth episode never aired as it was pre-empted for CBS News coverage of the Oklahoma City bombing.

== Episodes ==
No.	Title	Directed by	Written by	Original release date	Viewers (millions)
1	"The Episode Formerly Known as Prince"	Michael Lembeck	Stephen Nathan & Diane English	January 4, 1995	12.6
Johnny rejects an offer for his Double Rush Bicycle Messenger Service when his employees do not benefit from the deal. He rejects an opportunity to become a rock star when the record contract does not benefit his band. Double Rush and Ed Foley Couriers both seek the service contract of a new advertising company. Zoe Fuller, an unemployed Harvard University graduate, want to book a delivery with Double Rush and is hired as a bike messenger and their bookkeeper.
2	"I Left My Socks in San Antonio"	Michael Lembeck	Michael Curtis & Greg Malins	January 11, 1995	10.0
After betting on the San Antonio Spurs to beat the New York Knicks in a National Basketball Association game, Johnny assigns Hunter to deliver Spurs forward Dennis Rodman's socks to Madison Square Garden, but Hunter brings the gym bag containing the socks back to the Double Rush office instead. As Zoe tries to organize the office, she mistakenly throws the socks away, so Barkley makes fake socks for Rodman to cover up the error. Guest star: Dennis Rodman.
3	"Comings and Goings"	Michael Lembeck	Jim Herzfeld	January 18, 1995	10.4
Double Rush has made a $500 profit so Johnny sets up a competition over a trophy chair and cash prize totaling $500 to the messenger who makes the most runs. Marlon delivers gems to wealthy white people, Leo must talk a CBS-TV comedy executive out of committing suicide, Zoe delivers sperm to an ovulating wife, and the entire $500 may be lost because a patron of the Blue Shamrock is struck by Hunter and Double Rush may be sued. Guest stars: Doug Ballard, Linda Carlson, Andrew Craig, Pierre Epstein, Jim Jansen, Suzie Plakson, and Harley Venton.
4	"They Shoot Guns, Don't They?"	Michael Lembeck	Russ Woody	January 25, 1995	8.6
After Double Rush is robbed, the employees pressure Johnny into buying a gun. The gun gets used once — but not during a robbery. Guest star: Skip O'Brien.
5	"Johnny and the Pacemakers"	Michael Lembeck	Stephen Nathan	February 1, 1995	8.5
Johnny reunites with his old band and performs with them, hoping to experience for the first time everything about being a rock star, including the partying that follows a show. The gig goes great, but afterward he finds that time has caught up with them all — all his aging bandmates want to do after the show is go back to their hotel rooms and get ready to go to bed. Guest stars: Mark Blankfield, Rick Casorla, Stephanie Dicker, Don Lake, Rick Marotta, and Billy Vera.
6	"Snowings and Goings"	Michael Lembeck	Jim Herzfeld	March 6, 1995	14.7
When a blizzard hits New York City, Leo and Zoe are stuck in the back seat of a car together, "The Kid" fills in as a guest on a television talk show, Hunter is trapped by an elderly woman who thinks he is her son, and Johnny must help a rock star who seems destined to miss his show. Guest stars: Jim Chiros, Radmar Agana Jao, Michael Lembeck, Mark L. Taylor, and Erica Yohn.
7	"The Show We Wrote the Day We Found Out We Were Going on Opposite Roseanne"	Michael Lembeck	Michael Curtis & Greg Malins	March 8, 1995	11.8
After Johnny fires Leo for losing a big account, Leo gets a job with two organized crime figures with whom he once served time in prison. Guest stars: Patrick Fischler, Nicky Katt, and Vic Polizos.
8	"Lower East Side Story"	Michael Lembeck	Caryn Lucas	March 15, 1995	10.0
Although Double Rush is locked in a vicious competition for business with Ed Foley Couriers, Hunter begins dating Ed Foley's daughter, Kate.
9	"Hell's Angel"	Michael Lembeck	Stephen Nathan	March 22, 1995	8.5
Johnny grew up with a guy who he says was "nothing but trouble," but the man has become a priest. It appears that he may not have changed, however, when he writes a bad check. Guest stars: Lou Bonacki, Robert Clohessy, and Gracie Moore.
10	"Love Letters"	Michael Lembeck	Caryn Lucas	March 29, 1995	7.1
Hunter rushes love letters back and forth between a young couple, and it affects the rest of the staff of Double Rush. Guest stars: Clea Lewis and Mitchell Whitfield.
11	"Slamming Into a Car Isn't Good"	Michael Lembeck	Russ Woody	April 5, 1995	7.3
While Brubeck tries to find out about the mysterious Barkley, Marlon wins a debate about who should get a rush job. After Marlon hits a taxicab and is hospitalized, the staff of Double Rush heads to the hospital to visit him — and spends some time there trying to find him. Guest stars: Joey Lauren Adams, Shari Ballard, James Kiriyama-Lem, Nick Searcy, Liz Sheridan, Pamala Tyson, and Tom Winkler.
12	"The Documentary"	Michael Lembeck	Andy Cowan	April 12, 1995	6.6
While PBS is filming a documentary about bicycle messengers at Double Rush, the company loses a big account, and Johnny, no longer able to afford to pay everyone on the company's staff, must decide who to fire. Guest stars: Former mayor of New York City Ed Koch as himself, Taylor Nichols, and Mujibur Rahman (of Mujibur and Sirajul) as himself.
13	"Crimes and Mrs. DeMotto"	Michael Lembeck	N/A	Unaired	N/A
