= Murphy Brown =

American television sitcom (1988–1998, 2018)

- Genre: Sitcom
- Created by: Diane English
- Starring: Candice Bergen; Faith Ford; Charles Kimbrough; Robert Pastorelli; Joe Regalbuto; Grant Shaud; Pat Corley; Lily Tomlin; Jake McDorman; Nik Dodani; Adan Rocha; Tyne Daly
- Composer: Steve Dorff
- Country of origin: United States
- Original language: English
- No. of seasons: 11
- No. of episodes: 260 (list of episodes)

Production
- Executive producers: Candice Bergen; Michael Saltzman; Rob Bragin; Bill Diamond; Marc Flanagan; Joel Shukovsky; Diane English; Eric Schotz; Korby Siamis; John Bowman; Gary Dontzig; Steven Peterman
- Producers: DeAnne Heline; Bob Jeffords; Deborah Smith; Eileen Heisler; Ned E. Davis; Tom Seeley; Norm Gunzenhauser; Joshua Sternin; Jennifer Ventimilia; Barnet Kellman; Russ Woody; Frank Pace
- Running time: 21–27 minutes
- Production companies: Shukovsky-English Productions/Entertainment; Bend in the Road Productions; Warner Bros. Television

Original release
- Network: CBS
- Release: November 14, 1988 – May 18, 1998
- Release: September 27 – December 20, 2018

Murphy Brown is an American television sitcom created by Diane English that premiered on November 14, 1988, on CBS. The series stars Candice Bergen as the eponymous Murphy Brown, a famous investigative journalist and news anchor for FYI, a fictional CBS television newsmagazine, and later for Murphy in the Morning, a cable morning news show.

The series originally ran until May 18, 1998, after airing a total of 247 episodes over ten seasons. In January 2018, it was announced that CBS ordered a 13-episode revival of Murphy Brown, which premiered on September 27, 2018. CBS canceled the revival after one season on May 10, 2019.

== Plot ==
=== Original run ===
Murphy Brown (Candice Bergen) is a recovering alcoholic who, in the show's first episode, returns to the fictional newsmagazine FYI for the first time following a stay at the Betty Ford Clinic residential treatment center. Over 40 and single, she is sharp-tongued and hard as nails. In her profession, she is considered one of the boys, having shattered many glass ceilings encountered during her career. Dominating the FYI news magazine, she is portrayed as one of America's hardest-hitting (though not the warmest or most sympathetic) media personalities.

Her colleagues at FYI include stuffy veteran anchor Jim Dial (Charles Kimbrough), who affectionately addresses Murphy as "Slugger" and reminisces about the glory days of Murrow and Cronkite. Murphy's best friend and sometime competitor is investigative reporter Frank Fontana (Joe Regalbuto), the only person who addresses her as "Murph". Though a daredevil reporter, insecurities regarding fame and (especially) his personal relationships have him in psychotherapy for the majority of the series. In early seasons, there was a running gag about Frank's toupée, which he hated, but which producers insisted he wear on the show.

Also present are the two newest members of the FYI team. Miles Silverberg (Grant Shaud), a 25-year-old yuppie Harvard graduate and overachiever fresh from public television, is appointed the new executive producer of FYI during Murphy's stay at Betty Ford. Naive and neurotic despite his lightning intellect, Miles is the perfect foil for Murphy's wit. Shaud left at the end of the eighth season, and his character was replaced during Season 9 by veteran TV producer Kay Carter-Shepley (Lily Tomlin). Kay did not have a background in journalism but instead had made a career as a producer of game shows.

The other new-kid-on-the-block is Corky Sherwood (Faith Ford), who replaced Murphy during her stint in rehab. A former Miss America from the (fictional) town of Neebo, Louisiana, Corky is the bane of the other journalists with her perky, relentlessly sunny personality—and dumbfounding lack of sophistication. Due to overwhelming audience reaction, management decides to retain Corky's services after Murphy's return, usually assigning her to lifestyle pieces or lightweight celebrity profiles. Despite her omnipresent perkiness, Corky does mature and acquires a fair amount of worldliness over the years, not the least of which comes courtesy of her marriage to high school classmate and writer Will Forest (during which she humorously and cluelessly amends her on-air surname to "Corky Sherwood-Forest"), subsequent divorce, and later elopement with Miles, immediately after which the couple has second thoughts — even before consummating the relationship — and decides they should "first" date (despite already being married to one another), eventually separating on good terms.

The FYI team also frequently socializes at Phil's, a bar-and-grill across the street from their office/studio in Washington, D.C. Phil, the bar owner, was played by Pat Corley. Phil's was portrayed as a Washington institution, whose owner knew everything about everybody who had ever been anybody in the capital—ranging from what brand of lingerie J. Edgar Hoover preferred to the identity of Deep Throat (unknown to the public at the time of the series' production). In a running gag during early seasons, whenever someone entered Phil's (casting bright sunlight from the open door into the dark, murky bar), the patrons shouted in unison, "Close the door!"

Brown was unmarried, but had a home life as well: she hired a laid-back, New Age philosophy-dispensing house painter named Eldin Bernecky (Robert Pastorelli) to repaint her house. He had so many grand ideas that he was in her employ for six seasons. Because he was a highly talented artist, his renovations were often delayed when he was struck by the urge to paint socially relevant murals throughout the house.

=== Revival ===
Some twenty years later, Murphy has been retired from broadcast journalism for a few years but constantly receives offers to return to the air. Following Donald Trump's election as president of the United States, Brown decides to accept an offer from fictional cable news network CNC to host a new morning news show titled Murphy in the Morning. She brings along her former FYI colleagues including Frank and Corky to co-host the program and Miles to produce it. The crew is joined by newcomer Pat Patel (Nik Dodani), who serves as the show's social media manager. As the program gets closer to air, Brown is startled to learn that her son Avery (Jake McDorman) has been given his own morning news program on Murphy's competitor, conservative cable news network Wolf News, with their shows scheduled to air against each other. Meanwhile, Murphy and the gang continue to spend their off-time at the bar and grill "Phil's Bar", now run by Phil's sister Phyllis (Tyne Daly) following Phil's death. Jim Dial, now in his 80s, widowed and retired, comes back on an occasional basis to act as an informal mentor to the Murphy in the Morning gang.

== Cast and characters ==
=== Main ===
Actor	Character	Seasons										
Actor	Character	1	2	3	4	5	6	7	8	9	10	11
Candice Bergen	Murphy Brown	Main	Main	Main	Main	Main	Main	Main	Main	Main	Main	Main
Faith Ford	Corky Sherwood	Main	Main	Main	Main	Main	Main	Main	Main	Main	Main	Main
Pat Corley	Phil	Main	Main	Main	Main	Main	Main	Main	Main (Note: During season eight, Corley was only credited for the episodes he appeared in.)		Guest	
Charles Kimbrough	Jim Dial	Main	Main	Main	Main	Main	Main	Main	Main	Main	Main	Recurring
Robert Pastorelli	Eldin Bernecky	Main	Main	Main	Main	Main	Main	Main			Guest	
Joe Regalbuto	Frank Fontana	Main	Main	Main	Main	Main	Main	Main	Main	Main	Main	Main
Grant Shaud	Miles Silverberg	Main	Main	Main	Main	Main	Main	Main	Main			Main
Lily Tomlin	Kay Carter-Shepley									Main	Main	
Dyllan Christopher	Avery Brown							Recurring	Recurring			
Jackson Buckley	Avery Brown									Guest		
Haley Joel Osment	Avery Brown										Recurring	
Jake McDorman	Avery Brown											Main
Nik Dodani	Pat Patel											Main
Adan Rocha	Miguel Gonzales											Main
Tyne Daly	Phyllis											Main

- Candice Bergen as Murphy Brown, a famous investigative journalist and news anchor for FYI. In seasons 8 and 9, she also co-hosts a second show called Front and Center. Brown returns to television in her own morning news show Murphy in the Morning.
- Faith Ford as Corky Sherwood, a perky reporter (and former Miss America) hired to replace Murphy during her stay at the Betty Ford Clinic. Years later, she joins Murphy in the Morning as a co-host.
- Pat Corley as Phil (seasons 1–8; guest season 10), the extremely well-connected owner of Phil's Bar where the staff of FYI are regulars.
- Charles Kimbrough as Jim Dial (seasons 1–10; recurring season 11), the trustworthy veteran news anchor for FYI.
- Robert Pastorelli as Eldin Bernecky (seasons 1–7; guest season 10), an eccentric house painter that Murphy hires to renovate her house (and later employs as a live-in nanny).
- Joe Regalbuto as Frank Fontana, an investigative reporter on FYI and later Murphy in the Morning, and Murphy's best friend.
- Grant Shaud as Miles Silverberg (seasons 1–8, 11), the very young and nervous, but also bright and competent, executive producer at FYI and later Murphy in the Morning.
- Lily Tomlin as Kay Carter-Shepley (seasons 9–10), a crafty veteran television producer who has absolutely no news experience, and who replaces Miles at FYI.
- Dyllan Christopher (recurring seasons 7–8), Jackson Buckley (guest season 9), Haley Joel Osment (recurring season 10), and Jake McDorman (season 11) as Avery Brown, Murphy's son and a journalist and a liberal commentator on the conservative-leaning Wolf Network. In the original run of the series, he appears as a young child while in the revival he is some twenty years older.
- Nik Dodani as Pat Patel (season 11), the director of social media for Murphy in the Morning.
- Adan Rocha as Miguel Gonzales (season 11), a college student working at Phil's Bar in order to make extra money for his tuition.
- Tyne Daly as Phyllis (Season 11), the sister of Phil and the current owner of Phil's Bar.

=== Recurring ===
==== Behind the scenes at FYI ====
- John Hostetter as John, the stage manager at FYI.
- Ritch Brinkley as Carl Wishnitski, a cameraman at FYI who has an ongoing attraction to Murphy.
- Alan Oppenheimer as Gene Kinsella, a news-division executive. Seen as a recurring character in seasons 1–5, Kinsella is generally supportive of and liked by his FYI staff. In-show, the character is let go from his position and replaced with...
- Julius Carry as Mitchell Baldwin, the Machiavellian new boss who replaces Gene Kinsella. Baldwin, a Black man used the team's liberal-Caucasian guilt to railroad through changes in FYI's format and content. Appears in seasons 5 and 6, and in a dream sequence in season 8. Essentially superseded as the network thorn in FYI's side by...
- Garry Marshall as Stan Lansing, the very excitable, aggressive, and micro-managing network president. His frequent and impromptu whims are the bane of the FYI staff. Seen fairly regularly in seasons 6–9, and one final time in season 10.
- Paul Reubens as Andrew J. Lansing III, Stan Lansing's sociopathic nephew. He is introduced as one of Murphy's 93 secretaries du jour and was one of only three who measure up to Murphy's standards. Like the few other secretaries who were actually competent, Andrew is lured away from Murphy by another job by the end of the episode; in his case, he is promoted to a network executive position through nepotism. He periodically appears in later episodes, although his network career is wildly unpredictable, largely due to the mercurial nature of his uncle and mentor—at various times, Andrew is a network VP, an executive producer, and a mailboy. Seen as an occasional character in seasons 7–9.

==== On camera at FYI ====
- Christopher Rich as Miller Redfield, an empty-headed, pretty-boy reporter with a local affiliate who had semi-regular appearances on the show. At first, he was a recurring substitute anchor, but after a gap of a few years, he became a regular member of the FYI team —- although the rest of the team frequently (usually unsuccessfully) conspired to get rid of him. Later co-hosted a separate news show with Murphy called Front and Center, produced out of the same office. Seen once per season in seasons 2–4, he was then seen very frequently in seasons 7–9.
- Wallace Shawn as Stuart Best, a buffoonish former FYI reporter who annoyed Murphy, Jim, and Frank to the point that the three colluded to have him fired —- twice. After the second firing, Stuart returned as a hopelessly inept party-line politician who invariably broke down under even the most sympathetic questions by Murphy while on-air. Appeared once a season in seasons 6–9.
- Scott Bakula as Peter Hunt, a reporter and occasional love interest of Murphy's. Seen in seasons 6 through 8.
- Paula Cale as McGovern, a conservative young reporter based on MTV's Kennedy. She was added to the program when management tried to appeal to a younger demographic. Seen for a run of episodes as a regular towards the end of season 7, the character was then quietly dropped without explanation and never mentioned again.

==== Family and love interests ====
- Colleen Dewhurst as Avery Brown, a museum curator and Murphy's opinionated mother. Dewhurst won two Emmy Awards for her appearances, appearing in a total of four episodes in seasons 1–3. When Dewhurst died in 1991, the writers chose to have her character die as well, and dedicated the episode to the memory of Dewhurst. Murphy, who was pregnant at the time of her mother's death, named her son Avery in her mother's memory the following season.
- Darren McGavin as Bill Brown, a newspaper publisher and Murphy's father. Bill shared an adversarial relationship with his ex-wife Avery—especially after marrying Karen, a fresh-faced twenty-something who taught yoga. McGavin appeared in four episodes as Bill Brown (in seasons 2, 4 and 5) and earned an Emmy nomination in 1990 for his performance.
- Jay Thomas as Jerry Gold, an abrasive tabloid talk show host who became a friend of Murphy's and an occasional love interest, despite their significantly different journalistic values. Seen in seasons 2–4; returns in a dream sequence in 8, and in one episode (now about to get married) during season 10.
- Robin Thomas as Jake Lowenstein, an underground leftist radical and Murphy's ex-husband from long before her FYI days. Seen very infrequently, for a total of five episodes in seasons 1, 3, 4 and 8. Murphy and Jake had a brief relationship during season three, which resulted in Murphy's pregnancy.
- Jane Leeves as Audrey Cohen, Miles' girlfriend, seen occasionally in seasons 2–5. Though she and Miles were headed for marriage, the relationship ended abruptly—offscreen, Leeves joined the cast of Frasier in 1993, and was no longer available to appear on Murphy Brown.
- Janet Carroll (seasons 2–9) and Concetta Tomei (season 10) as Doris Dial, anchorman Jim Dial's equally stoic, but kind-hearted wife.
- Pat Finn as Phil Jr. (ten episodes in Seasons 8 and 9), Phil's son who, though somewhat empty-headed, takes on running Phil's Bar after his father dies.
- Dena Dietrich as Phyllis (two episodes in Season 2 & one episode in Season 9), Phil's wife and mother of their four children: Little Phil, Phillip, Felicia, & Phil Jr.

==== Behind the scenes at Murphy in the Morning (season 11 only) ====
- Andre Ward as Julius, the stage manager of Murphy in the Morning.
- Merle Dandridge as Diana Macomber, the head of cable news network CNC, which airs Murphy in the Morning.

== Storyline ==
=== Early seasons ===
The cast of Murphy Brown (1988–96, from left): (front) Kimbrough, Bergen, Regalbuto, Ford, Shaud; (back) Pastorelli, Corley

The first season saw Murphy relearning her job without the use of two crutches—alcohol and cigarettes. In the pilot episode, she complained the only vice she had left herself was chewing yellow number-two pencils. It also set up the series-long running gag of Murphy's battles with the off-beat and sometimes downright bizarre characters who were sent by Personnel to act as her secretary, none of whom ever last for more than an episode, save two; one played by Paul Reubens.

Action was divided between the FYI suite of offices and Murphy's Georgetown townhouse. Reality often blended with fiction with the many cameos of then-current media and political personalities. The most prominent was when Murphy Brown was asked to guest star as herself in the pilot of a sitcom entitled Kelly Green, about a female investigative journalist. Life imitated art when, after a less-than stellar performance, Murphy was berated by television journalist Connie Chung (herself in a Murphy Brown cameo appearance) for crossing the line and compromising her credibility.

Subsequent seasons saw the emergence of story arcs involving network politics with Gene Kinsella, Frank and Murphy's rivalry and Eldin's ongoing infatuation with Corky. A standout event was Miss Sherwood's marriage to Louisiana lawyer Will Forrest. During the brief engagement, a horrified Corky comes to the realization that she will now be "Corky Sherwood-Forrest". In the wedding episode, maid-of-honor Murphy, dressed as an antebellum belle in a hoop-skirted nightmare of a bridemaid's dress, rages her way through the entire affair while thwarting the press's attempts to photograph the nuptials (mirroring the Sean Penn/Madonna wedding a few years earlier).

=== Later seasons ===
The fifth season continued after the departure of series creator and showrunner Diane English. Murphy's struggles with parenthood were highlighted, as were the revolving-door of nanny characters mirroring her office tribulations. Corky's marriage unraveled and ended in divorce as she and Will grew apart. (Right before the wedding, Forrest had decided to abandon the practice of law and follow his true calling—creative writing.) This tragedy saw Corky become less the Pollyanna as she began to model herself after role-model Murphy.

The show went on, and FYI featured several changes in on- and off-camera staff: Peter Hunt, McGovern and Miller Redfield temporarily joined the regulars at the anchor desk. The network moved FYI to a new studio with a trendy exterior "Window on America". A significant story arc saw the network squelch an FYI exposé on the tobacco industry, leading to the resignation of first Dial, then the remainder of the cast. They all went to work reorganizing the poorly-performing news division of a fledgling network. In the end, Miles faced down the network; the "suits" relented, the staffers returned and the story aired. For his courage in standing up to the network brass, Miles was promoted to the news division's headquarters in New York—to the detriment of his new marriage to Corky.

As well, after years of working as her housepainter, and later nanny, Eldin (who was seen increasingly infrequently after season 5) left Murphy's employ during season 7 to study painting in Spain. (Actor Robert Pastorelli left Murphy Brown for his own starring vehicle, the sitcom Double Rush, which lasted one season in 1995.)

The cast of Murphy Brown for its final two seasons. Lily Tomlin is pictured fourth from the left.

By the start of the 1996–97 season, viewership was beginning to decline. Shaud left the series and comedian Lily Tomlin was brought in to replace him in the role of executive producer Kay Carter-Shepley to help bolster the sitcom's ratings. Kay proved that she had just as little journalistic experience as Miles Silverberg when he started with the show; the only experience Kay had in television—in spite of her venerable connections—was producing daytime game shows. Where Murphy had terrorized the younger Miles, the Machiavellian Kay often emerged victorious in her dealings with Murphy. Tomlin remained with the series until its end, but it did not help with the ratings.

For the fall of 1997, Murphy Brown was renewed for a tenth and final season, and was moved out of its usual Monday night slot to Wednesday night following The Nanny. The move did not work out, as the ratings fell even further than they had the season before. Murphy Brown finished the season in 85th place in the ratings, despite eventually being relocated to Monday night.

Beginning on October 1, 1997, the entire season's story arc was Murphy's battle with breast cancer. The storyline was not without controversy; an episode in which she used medical marijuana to relieve side effects of chemotherapy was attacked by conservative groups, and a women's health group protested an episode in which Murphy, while shopping for prosthetic breasts, uttered the line "Should I go with Demi Moore or Elsie the Cow?"

However, the show's handling of the subject was credited with a 30 percent increase in the number of women getting mammograms that year, and Bergen was presented an award from the American Cancer Society in honor of her role in educating women on the importance of breast cancer prevention and screening.

In the original run's final episode, Murphy met and interviewed God (played by Alan King) and Edward R. Murrow in a dream while undergoing surgery. Computer editing was used to insert footage of the real Murrow, who died in 1965, into the show. Diane English, who created the show, made a cameo appearance as a nurse who delivered the results to Murphy after her surgery. At the end of the episode, Murphy walks through her house seemingly alone, only to have Eldin appear at the end, offering to "touch up" her house.

== Continuation ==
=== Development ===
Following the end of the show's original run, series creator Diane English had been approached multiple times about potentially reviving the series. Around 2008, the show came the closest to being brought back to the air following Sarah Palin's nomination as the Republican vice-presidential nominee with comparisons being drawn between her and former Murphy Brown critic Dan Quayle. In 2017, Warner Bros. Television again approached English about reviving the series following the election of Donald Trump as president. English spent nine months developing an idea for a new iteration of the series before finally composing a script. Candice Bergen was then approached about signing on to the project and she agreed on the condition that Faith Ford, Joe Regalbuto, and Grant Shaud join as well.

On January 24, 2018, it was announced that CBS had given the production a series order for one season consisting of thirteen episodes set to air during the 2018–2019 season. English and Bergen were set to serve as executive producers of the revival which would, according to CBS, be set in "a world of cable news, social media, fake news and a very different political and cultural climate." Production companies involved with the series were slated to consist of Bend in the Road Productions and Warner Bros. Television. On February 27, 2018, it was announced that Pam Fryman would direct the revival's pilot episode.

On May 16, 2018, it was announced during the CBS upfronts presentation that the revival would now have Murphy anchoring a cable morning show, Murphy In the Morning, with her old team, lifestyle reporter Corky Sherwood, investigative journalist Frank Fontana, and producer Miles Silverberg, while Murphy's son Avery would host a rival, cable morning show that airs opposite his mother's program. On July 9, 2018, it was announced that the series would premiere on September 27, 2018. On September 21, 2018, it was reported that CBS had extended the running time of the premiere episode of the revival by five minutes.

On November 28, 2018, it was reported that the season would end after the thirteen episodes ordered by CBS had aired. However, it was further reported that the series was still under consideration by CBS to be renewed for another season. On May 10, 2019, CBS canceled the revival series after a single season.

=== Casting ===
Alongside the initial announcement of the revival, it was confirmed that Candice Bergen would reprise her role as Murphy Brown. On February 26, 2018, it was announced that Faith Ford, Joe Regalbuto, and Grant Shaud were joining the main cast and reprising their roles from the series' original run. It was also reported Charles Kimbrough would not be returning to the series full-time, but might make a guest appearance in the revival. On March 16, 2018, it was announced that Jake McDorman and Nik Dodani had also joined the main cast. McDorman was set to assume the role of Murphy Brown's now adult son Avery. On April 19, 2018, it was announced that Tyne Daly had joined the main cast in the role of Phyllis, the sister of the deceased bar owner Phil from the series' original run. On August 5, 2018, it was confirmed during the Television Critics Association's annual summer press tour that Kimbrough would reprise his role from the series' original run in a three-episode story arc. On September 13, 2018, it was reported that Adan Rocha had been cast in a series regular role. In October 2018, it was announced that Merle Dandridge had joined the cast in a recurring capacity and that Bette Midler, Brooke Shields, John Larroquette, Katie Couric, and Peter Gallagher would appear in guest-starring roles.

Before the premiere of the season, it was reported that the first episode would feature a guest appearance from a prominent individual. The identity of the guest was kept secret until the episode aired with the network going so far as to not include the scene in which they appeared in screeners for the press. Upon the episode's release, it was revealed that the guest star was in fact former secretary of state and Democratic presidential nominee Hillary Clinton.

=== Critical response ===
On the review aggregation website Rotten Tomatoes, the season holds an approval rating of 45% with an average rating of 6.00 out of 10, based on 47 reviews. The website's critical consensus reads, "This just in: while the nostalgia and wit are welcome, Murphy Brown's dated messaging tactics feel heavy-handed and smug, leaving this formerly formidably timely series feeling like a reboot reaching for the headlines." Metacritic, which uses a weighted average, assigned the season a score of 53 out of 100 based on 27 critics, indicating "mixed or average reviews".

== Episodes ==
Season	Episodes	Originally released		Rank	Avg. rating (Note: In households; seasons 1-9)/ Avg. viewers (Note: In millions; seasons 10–11)
Season	Episodes	First released	Last released	Rank	Avg. rating/ Avg. viewers
1	22	November 14, 1988	May 22, 1989	36	14.9
2	27	September 18, 1989	May 21, 1990	26	14.7
3	26	September 17, 1990	May 20, 1991	6	16.9
4	26	September 16, 1991	May 18, 1992	3	18.6
5	25	September 21, 1992	May 17, 1993	4	17.9
6	25	September 20, 1993	May 16, 1994	9	16.3
7	26	September 19, 1994	May 22, 1995	16	14.1
8	24	September 18, 1995	May 20, 1996	18	12.3
9	24	September 16, 1996	May 19, 1997	34	10.4
10	22	October 1, 1997	May 18, 1998	86	9.9
11	13	September 27, 2018	December 20, 2018	35	8.47

== Cultural impact ==
=== Murphy as a single mother ===
In the show's 1991–92 season, Murphy became pregnant. When her baby's father (ex-husband and current underground radical Jake Lowenstein) expressed his unwillingness to give up his own lifestyle to be a parent, Murphy chose to have the child and raise it alone. Another major fiction-reality blending came at Murphy's baby shower: the invited guests were journalists Katie Couric, Joan Lunden, Paula Zahn, Mary Alice Williams and Faith Daniels, who treated the fictional Murphy and Corky as friends and peers.

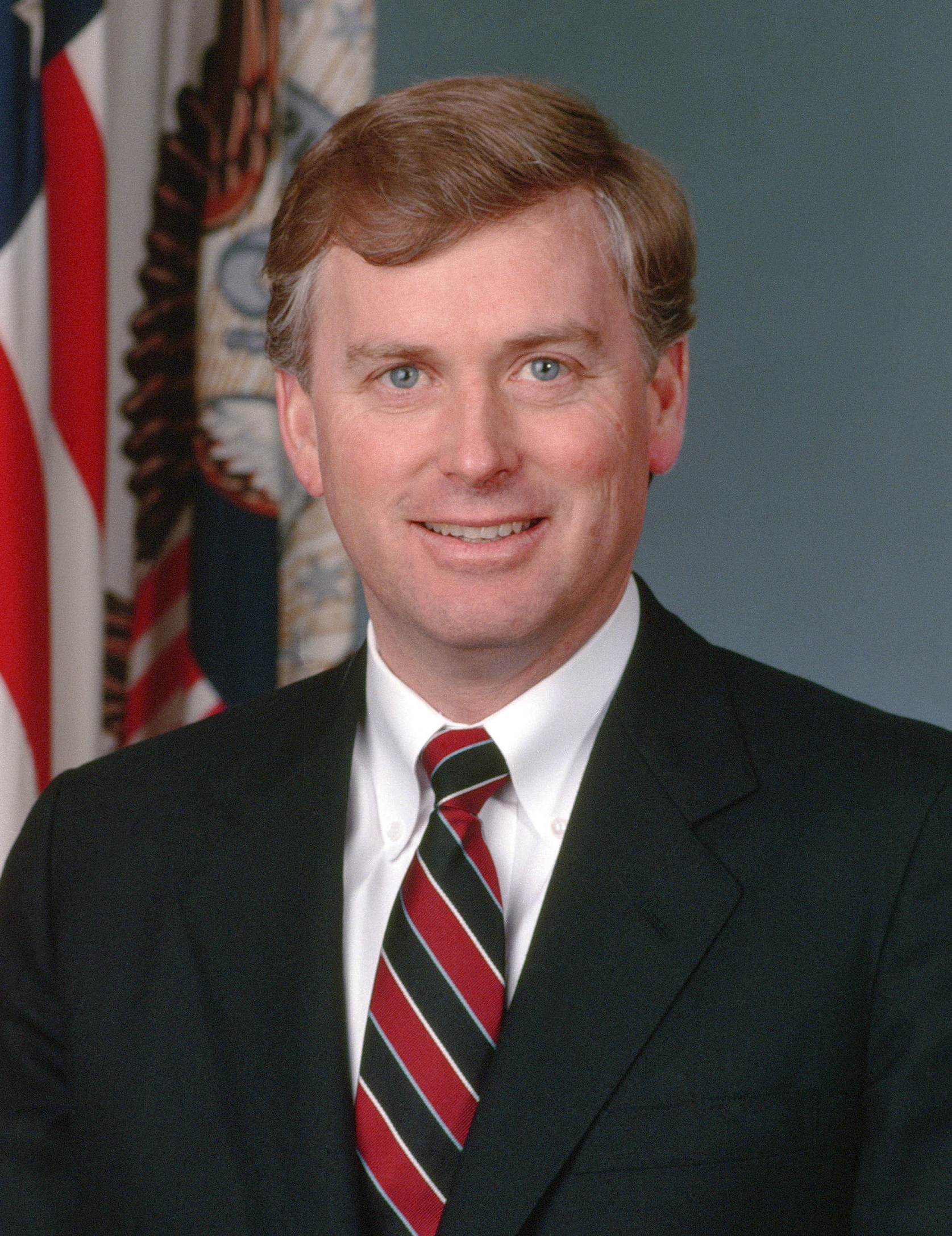
Dan Quayle criticized single parenting during his 1992 speech.

At the point where she was about to give birth, she had stated that "several people do not want me to have the baby. Pat Robertson; Phyllis Schlafly; half of Utah!" Right after giving birth to her son Avery, Murphy sang the song "(You Make Me Feel Like) A Natural Woman". This storyline made the show a subject of political controversy during the 1992 American presidential campaign. On May 19, 1992, Vice President Dan Quayle spoke at the Commonwealth Club in San Francisco. During his speech, he criticized the Murphy Brown character for "mocking the importance of fathers by bearing a child alone".

Quayle's remarks caused a public discussion on family values, culminating in the 1992–93 season premiere, "You Say Potatoe, I Say Potato", where the television characters reacted to Quayle's comments and produced a special episode of FYI showcasing and celebrating the diversity of the modern American family. Because Quayle's actual speech made little reference to Murphy Brown's fictional nature (other than the use of the word character), the show was able to use actual footage from his speech to make it appear that, within the fictional world of the show, Quayle was referring to Murphy Brown personally, rather than to the fictional character. At the end, Brown helps organize a special edition of FYI focusing on different kinds of families, then arranges a retaliatory prank in which a truckload of potatoes is dumped in front of Quayle's residence while a disc jockey playfully commenting on the incident notes the Vice President should be glad people were not making fun of him for misspelling "fertilizer". This referenced how, on June 15, 1992, at a spelling bee in Trenton, New Jersey, Quayle had erroneously corrected an elementary-school student's spelling of "potato" to "potatoe". The cue card used by the teacher read "potatoe". When Candice Bergen won another Emmy that year, she thanked Dan Quayle. The feud was cited by E! as #81 on its list of "101 Reasons the '90s Ruled".

In 2002, Bergen said in an interview that she personally agreed with much of Quayle's speech, calling it "a perfectly intelligent speech about fathers not being dispensable" and adding that "nobody agreed with that more than I did."

Quayle eventually displayed a sense of humor about the incident—after the controversy died down, he appeared for an interview on an independent Los Angeles TV station and for his final question was asked what his favorite TV show was. He responded with "Murphy Brown—Not!" The station later used the clip of Quayle's response to promote its showing of Murphy Brown re-runs in syndication.

Quayle's complaint notwithstanding, prime-time TV in 1992 was "boosting family values more aggressively than it has in decades", wrote Time magazine critic Richard Zoglin, citing everything from Home Improvement to Roseanne. Murphy Brown was worth highlighting in a vice-presidential speech "not because it represented the state of television and the culture in general" but because Murphy's choice of single motherhood departed from it. The show has been seen as blazing a trail for single-mother characters in Ally McBeal, Sex and the City, Desperate Housewives, and The Good Wife—and "benefited from Bergen's character going through a political maelstrom so none of them had to."

In 2010, Murphy was ranked #25 on the TV Guide Network special, 25 Greatest TV Characters of All Time.

== Syndication ==
Murphy Brown was unsuccessful when it was introduced in off-network syndication in the 1990s, in part because of costly music rights fees. Also, some topical news and cultural references featured in episodes of the show had quickly become dated. It was reintroduced to cable and digital multicast networks in the 2010s, beginning with a run on Encore Classic in 2013, with the series airing on Antenna TV from January 2018–August 2021, then it later moved to sister station Rewind TV as of the channel's launch on September 1, 2021.

== Home media ==
Warner Home Video released the first season of Murphy Brown on DVD in Region 1 on February 8, 2005. Due to low sales and high music licensing costs, no future releases are planned.

DVD name	Eps	Release dates			Notes
DVD name	Eps	Region 1	Region 2	Region 4	Notes
The Complete First Season	22	February 8, 2005	N/A	N/A	A documentary, Murphy Brown: An FYI Exclusive, features a look back at season one and how it all began with interviews by Creator/Executive Producer Diane English, Candice Bergen, writers and supporting cast.; Episode commentary on "Summer of '77" and "Respect" with Candice Bergen and Diane English.
