= Murphy Brown season 11 =

Murphy Brown
- Season 11
- Promotional poster
- Starring: Candice Bergen; Faith Ford; Joe Regalbuto; Grant Shaud; Jake McDorman; Nik Dodani; Adan Rocha; Tyne Daly
- No. of episodes: 13

Release
- Original network: CBS
- Original release: September 27 – December 20, 2018

Season chronology
- ← Previous; Season 10

The eleventh and final season of the American television sitcom Murphy Brown follows news anchor Murphy Brown and the cast and crew of the morning news show Murphy in the Morning as they combat the rise of misinformation and fake news from their studio in Washington, D.C. The season was produced by Warner Bros. Television and Bend in the Road Productions, with Diane English and Candice Bergen serving as executive producers.

Bergen stars as Murphy Brown and is joined by principal cast members Faith Ford, Joe Regalbuto, and Grant Shaud, who reprised their roles from the previous seasons, with Jake McDorman, Nik Dodani, Adan Rocha, and Tyne Daly joining them. Upon its premiere, the season was met with a mixed response from critics though it did receive awards recognition including a Golden Globe Award for Best Actress – Television Series Musical or Comedy nomination for Bergen.

== Cast and characters ==
=== Main ===
- Candice Bergen as Murphy Brown, a famous investigative journalist and news anchor for FYI. Following a brief retirement, Brown returns to television in her own morning news show Murphy in the Morning.
- Faith Ford as Corky Sherwood, a reporter hired by FYI to replace Murphy during her stay at the Betty Ford Clinic. Years later, she joins Murphy in the Morning as a co-host after getting fired from her job on another morning talk show.
- Joe Regalbuto as Frank Fontana, an investigative reporter on FYI and later Murphy in the Morning.
- Grant Shaud as Miles Silverberg, an executive producer at FYI and later Murphy in the Morning.
- Jake McDorman as Avery Brown, Murphy's son, a journalist and a liberal commentator on the conservative-leaning Wolf Network.
- Nik Dodani as Pat Patel, the director of social media for Murphy in the Morning.
- Adan Rocha as Miguel, a college student working at Phil's Bar in order to make extra money for his school tuition.
- Tyne Daly as Phyllis, the sister of Phil and the current owner of Phil's Bar.

=== Recurring ===
- Andre Ward as Julius, the stage manager of Murphy in the Morning.
- Merle Dandridge as Diana Macomber, the head of cable news network CNC, which airs Murphy in the Morning.
- Charles Kimbrough as Jim Dial, the former veteran news anchor for FYI whom Murphy seeks out for advice.

=== Guest ===
- Hillary Clinton as Hilary Clendon ("Fake News"), an applicant for the position of Murphy's secretary.
- Ashley Austin Morris as Addie Abrams ("I (Don't) Heart Huckabee"), one of Murphy's secretaries, who arrives to work hung over.
- Harris Yulin as Professor Talbot ("#MurphyToo"), a collegiate journalism professor of Murphy's who sexually harassed her while she was his student.
- Joey Slotnick as Brandon Jensen ("#MurphyToo"), the leader of a sexual harassment seminar for the employees of Murphy in the Morning.
- David Costabile as Ed Shannon ("Three Shirts to the Wind"), a former White House advisor whom Diana wants to have appear on Murphy in the Morning. Murphy is unsure as to whether she should give him a platform or not with Corky and Frank against the idea and Miles tentatively in favor of it.
- Katie Finneran as Christy Shepherd ("The Girl Who Cried About Wolf"), a news anchor at the Wolf Network whom Frank begins dating.
- Peter Gallagher as John Haggerty ("Results May Vary"), a conservative right-wing news anchor at the Wolf Network who hosts The Wolf Pack news show and covers the 2018 midterm elections with Avery.
- Kara Lindsay as Callie Clark ("Results May Vary"), a co-host of the Wolf Network show The Wolf Pack alongside John Haggerty.
- Bette Midler as Caprice Feldman-Morton ("A Lifetime of Achievement"), a former secretary of Murphy's who recently became the largest shareholder of CNC following the death of her husband, Carl Morton.
- John Larroquette as Nate Campbell ("A Lifetime of Achievement"), a federal judge for the D.C. Circuit court who Murphy meets at the Lionel P. Humboldt Lifetime Achievement Award dinner and whom she later has a one-night stand with.
- Katie Couric as herself ("A Lifetime of Achievement"), a journalist and longtime friend of Murphy and Corky. She runs into them while hosting the Lionel P. Humboldt Lifetime Achievement Award dinner.
- Analeigh Tipton as Lauren McCoy ("A Lifetime of Achievement"), an archivist at the Smithsonian and Avery's date to the Lionel P. Humboldt Lifetime Achievement Award dinner.
- Brooke Shields as Holly Mackin Lynne ("The Coma and the Oxford Comma"), a friend of Corky's from her beauty pageant days who awakens from a coma after ten years.
- Stephen Plunkett as Charles Lynne ("The Coma and the Oxford Comma"), Holly's husband who was acquitted of attempted murder while she was in her coma.
- Joanna P. Adler as Mary Kate #97 ("The Coma and the Oxford Comma"), one of Murphy's secretaries who takes grammar very seriously.
- Harrison Chad as Connor ("The Coma and the Oxford Comma"), a friend of Avery's whom he has known since high school.
- Valente Rodriguez as Carlos Gonzales ("Thanksgiving and Taking"), a food truck owner and Miguel's father who entered the United States illegally many years ago. He comes over to Murphy's home for Thanksgiving but is apprehended by ICE and deported.
- Selenis Leyva as Maria Gonzales ("Thanksgiving and Taking"), a food truck owner and Miguel's mother. Along with her husband, she is apprehended by ICE and deported on Thanksgiving.
- Judy Gold as Officer Lynch ("Thanksgiving and Taking"), an ICE agent who apprehends the Gonzales
- Ethan Slater as Officer Reynolds ("Thanksgiving and Taking"), an ICE agent who apprehends the Gonzales
- Bart Shatto as Zac ("Beat the Press"), a Trump supporter from Altoona, Pennsylvania whom Avery interviews shortly before being assaulted
- Peter Scolari as Fred Noonan ("The Wheels on the Dog Go Round and Round"), a health inspector who investigates Phil's bar
- Negin Farsad as Maha Bijan ("The Wheels on the Dog Go Round and Round"), an employee at the 14th Street Animal Shelter who sells Murphy a disabled dog
- Lindsay Mendez as Rachel ("The Wheels on the Dog Go Round and Round"), a producer on Avery's news program who pushes him to read what the network has instructed him to
- Andrea Mitchell as herself ("Happy New Year")
- Lawrence O'Donnell as himself ("Happy New Year")
- Zachary James as Secret Serviceman ("Happy New Year")

== Episodes ==
No. overall	No. in season	Title	Directed by	Written by	Original release date	Prod. code	U.S. viewers (millions)
248	1	"Fake News"	Pamela Fryman	Diane English	September 27, 2018	T36.10001	7.50
Following a brief retirement, Murphy Brown decides to accept an offer to host a morning news show on the cable news network CNC, titled Murphy in the Morning. She brings along her former FYI colleagues, Corky Sherwood and Frank Fontana as her co-hosts, and Miles Silverberg to produce it. Her son Avery has also been given his own morning news program on a rival network, the Wolf Network which airs against his mother's. Her show's social media manager, Pat Patel wants Murphy to join social media, and that gets her into a Twitter war with Donald Trump during her first show. Phil's Bar is now run by Phil's sister, Phyllis.
249	2	"I (Don't) Heart Huckabee"	Pamela Fryman	Tom Palmer	October 4, 2018	T36.10002	7.12
Murphy has been banned from any White House press briefings because of her on-air tiff with President Trump, so she and her team try to sneak her into a press briefing. Wearing a disguise she poses as a French reporter named Cossette, and is able to get in. Once inside she ditches her disguise, and eventually asks Sarah Huckabee Sanders, why she lies. Murphy wants her fellow journalists including Avery to walk out with her but they don't. Avery is mad that she took over the briefing and prevented him from asking Sarah a question. Phyllis hires a DREAMer named Miguel to help her out at the bar.
250	3	"#MurphyToo"	Don Scardino	Gina Ippolito & Skander Halim	October 11, 2018	T36.10004	6.76
After a workplace harassment seminar, Murphy reveals to Avery that she has her own #MeToo moment. She tells him that a former professor took advantage of her when she was 19. She goes to confront him but he denies it, and blames her. He tries to take credit for her success but she quickly shuts him up by saying that she worked hard for her success in spite of him. Meanwhile Frank tests an app that Pat developed that will zap him every time he says something inappropriate. Miles has romantic feelings for a co-worker, and Miguel ducks whenever someone says "ice".
251	4	"Three Shirts to the Wind"	Don Scardino	Laura Krafft	October 18, 2018	T36.10003	6.39
In an effort to boost the ratings of Murphy in the Morning, Diana Macomber, the head of CNC, wants Murphy to interview former White House adviser Ed Shannon. Murphy struggles with whether or not to give Shannon, who professes extreme far-right views, a platform on her show. Frank and Corky are against the idea but Miles is tentatively for it, mainly due to his fear of upsetting Diana. In an effort to make up her mind, Murphy seeks out the advice of her former FYI co-anchor, Jim Dial. He advises her not to do the interview citing his belief that having Shannon on the program would promote a false equivalency and help to normalize his views. Murphy takes Dial's advice and does not hold the interview but ultimately ends up debating Shannon anyway when he tracks her down at Phil's. Later, Murphy is informed by Avery that her confrontation with Shannon was recorded and a video of it has gone viral online.
252	5	"The Girl Who Cried About Wolf"	Don Scardino	Norm Gunzenhauser	October 25, 2018	T36.10005	6.05
The Murphy in the Morning staff prepare to broadcast a story featuring a pharmaceutical company whistleblower who possesses information concerning America's opioid epidemic during which time Murphy and Frank's longtime friendship is tested. It is revealed that Frank has recently begun dating a news anchor from the rival Wolf Network and Murphy and the rest of the show's crew express their concern with the possibility of their upcoming news story leaking to their competitors. Frank responds by accusing Murphy of being hypocritical as her son Avery is also a Wolf employee.
253	6	"Results May Vary"	Don Scardino	Gary Dontzig & Steven Peterman	November 1, 2018	T36.10006	5.94
CNC and Wolf Network's morning teams both host day-long coverage of the 2018 midterm elections. During the broadcast of Murphy in the Morning, Frank struggles to stay awake and alert, while Pat deals with stage fright over his first on-camera appearance. Meanwhile, Avery appears on the Wolf Network's panel show The Wolf Pack with veteran news anchor John Haggerty. Avery finds himself forced into holding his ground when Haggerty begins to assert his authority and standing at the network.
254	7	"A Lifetime of Achievement"	Michael Lembeck	Tom Seeley	November 8, 2018	T36.10007	6.01
The Murphy in the Morning crew attend a lifetime achievement award dinner for Jim Dial, where Murphy meets Judge Nate Campbell with whom she later has a one night stand. Meanwhile, Avery is nervous about introducing his date to his mother, Corky carries on an old rivalry with Katie Couric, Miles learns that Pat is gay, and Jim frets over the fact that Phyllis is viewing her escorting him to the dinner as a date.
255	8	"The Coma and the Oxford Comma"	Michael Lembeck	Marc Flanagan	November 15, 2018	T36.10008	5.96
Corky's beauty pageant friend, Holly Mackin Lynne has woken up after being in a coma for ten years. The Murphy in the Morning team wants to be the ones to break the story that she has woken up. When Holly went into the coma it was a nationwide story, and her husband was put on trial for attempted murder. Her husband was acquitted but Murphy still believes that he was the one who pushed her down the stairs. Corky refuses to believe that her childhood friend could do such a thing. Holly begins to remember that night and says that she tripped over the cat which made her fall down the stairs. But when Corky does a live report at her bedside, she reveals what really happened that night. She and her husband were fighting and he greased the floor with Pam so she could fall. She lied about the cat so she could call him out on live television. The Wolf Network makes a promo that makes Avery look sexy.
256	9	"Thanksgiving and Taking"	Michael Lembeck	Russ Woody	November 22, 2018	T36.10009	4.75
Notoriously culinarily-challenged Murphy invites her friends to join her and Avery for Thanksgiving dinner, much to everyone's chagrin. Despite a heavy storm blowing in, Frank, Corky, Miles, Pat, Avery, Phyllis, Miguel and his parents all arrive for the meal. However, a number of setbacks delay the dinner until a power outage forces everyone outside to Miguel's parents' food truck to cook the meal. The holiday then takes a sour turn when ICE arrives to arrest Miguel's parents for illegal immigration. Miguel is heartbroken as he watches his parents led away to be deported as Phyllis vows to watch over him. Avery has Pat record the arrest and, the following day, a tearful Murphy reports on the arrest on her show and vows to help fight for immigration reform so families like Miguel's will not be separated any more.
257	10	"Beat the Press"	Pamela Fryman	Tom Palmer	November 29, 2018	T36.10010	5.59
When Frank volunteers to cover a rally in Pennsylvania, he is subsequently called out by the president and, later, attacked by some of the locals in the parking lot. When Avery goes to follow up on the story for Frank, he, too is assaulted. The events cause Murphy to approach an interview more cautiously and prompt a debate between herself and the gang over their concerns of the growing dangers of the journalism field. In the end, despite the dangers, Murphy and the gang resolve to keep reporting the news in the same manner they always have.
258	11	"The Wheels on the Dog Go Round and Round"	Pamela Fryman	Laura Krafft	December 6, 2018	T36.10011	5.97
Avery is given a new time slot in prime time at The Wolf Network and is excited over the promotion, though Murphy and the others have their reservations and inform Avery he will be expected to toe the company line. Avery denies this will be the case but soon learns otherwise when he is asked by his producer to read on air a network-penned editorial, forcing Avery to choose between his job and his journalistic integrity. Meanwhile, Corky ambushes Murphy into joining her for a human interest piece at a dog shelter and manipulates Murphy into adopting a dog. Murphy proudly volunteers after learning of the animals that get put down and offers to take the next one scheduled for euthanasia, but gets more than she bargained for when the dog turns out to have wheels. Murphy and Avery soon take to the animal, however, naming him Ben-Hur Brown, or Benny for short.
259	12	"AWOL"	Joe Regalbuto	Gary Dontzig & Steven Peterman	December 13, 2018	T36.10012	5.55
Murphy and the gang attempt to shed light on the ongoing conflict in Afghanistan but keep getting stonewalled by Pentagon brass. Miles attempts to give the team more time to report the story on air but the situation is complicated when one of Murphy's sources goes missing. Meanwhile, Avery is still adjusting to unemployment and has trouble finding ways to feel useful. After listening to Murphy and Frank talk about the old days, he is inspired to work as a freelance journalist and go to Afghanistan to find Murphy's source. Murphy expresses her reservations on the idea but ultimately allows Avery to go.
260	13	"Happy New Year"	Barnet Kellman	Story by : Tom Seeley & Norm Gunzenhauser; Teleplay by : Gina Ippolito & Skander Halim	December 20, 2018	T36.10013	5.21
A reluctant Phyllis is talked into throwing a New Year's Eve party to commemorate the 100th anniversary of Phil's and Murphy and the gang try to have a great time, despite their worry over Avery, who is still in Afghanistan. At the party, Corky tries to land an interview with the Vice President while Jim Dial, Murphy and other guests reminisce over the special memories they made in Phil's. In the end, Murphy gets a happy surprise when Avery returns home safe and sound and with the evidence from Murphy's source to break the Afghanistan story.

== Production ==
=== Development ===
Following the end of the show's original run, series creator Diane English had been approached multiple times about potentially reviving the series. Around 2008, the show came the closest to being brought back to the air following Sarah Palin's nomination as the Republican vice-presidential nominee with comparisons being drawn between her and former Murphy Brown critic Dan Quayle. In 2017, Warner Bros. Television again approached English about reviving the series following the election of Donald Trump as president. English spent nine months developing an idea for a new iteration of the series before finally composing a script. Candice Bergen was then approached about signing on to the project and she agreed on the condition that Faith Ford, Joe Regalbuto, and Grant Shaud join as well.

On January 24, 2018, it was announced that CBS had given the production a series order for one season consisting of thirteen episodes set to air during the 2018–2019 season. English and Bergen were set to serve as executive producers of the revival which would, according to CBS, be set in "a world of cable news, social media, fake news and a very different political and cultural climate." Production companies involved with the series were slated to consist of Bend in the Road Productions and Warner Bros. Television. On February 27, 2018, it was announced that Pam Fryman would direct the revival's pilot episode.

On May 16, 2018, it was announced during the CBS upfronts presentation that the revival would now have Murphy anchoring a cable morning show, Murphy in the Morning, with her old team, lifestyle reporter Corky Sherwood, investigative journalist Frank Fontana, and producer Miles Silverberg, while Murphy's son Avery would host a rival, cable morning show that airs opposite his mother's program. On July 9, 2018, it was announced that the series would premiere on September 27, 2018. On September 21, 2018, it was reported that CBS had extended the running time of the premiere episode of the revival by five minutes.

On November 28, 2018, it was reported that the season would end after the thirteen episodes ordered by CBS had aired. However, it was further reported that the series was still under consideration by CBS to be renewed for another season. On May 10, 2019, CBS canceled the revival of the series after only a single season due to lackluster ratings.

=== Casting ===
Alongside the initial announcement of the revival, it was confirmed that Candice Bergen would reprise her role as Murphy Brown. On February 26, 2018, it was announced that Faith Ford, Joe Regalbuto, and Grant Shaud were joining the main cast and reprising their roles from the series' original run. It was also reported Charles Kimbrough might make a guest appearance in the revival. On March 16, 2018, it was announced that Jake McDorman and Nik Dodani had also joined the main cast. McDorman is set to assume the role of Murphy Brown's now adult son Avery. On April 19, 2018, it was announced that Tyne Daly had joined the main cast in the role of Phyllis, the sister of the deceased bar owner Phil from the series' original run. On August 5, 2018, it was announced during the Television Critics Association's annual summer press tour that Charles Kimbrough would reprise his role from the series' original run in a three episode story arc. On September 13, 2018, it was reported that Adan Rocha had been cast in a series regular role. In October 2018, it was announced that Merle Dandridge had joined the cast in a recurring capacity and that Bette Midler, Brooke Shields, John Larroquette, Katie Couric, and Peter Gallagher would appear in guest starring roles.

Before the premiere of the season, it was reported that the first episode would feature a guest appearance from a prominent individual. The identity of the guest was being kept secret until the episode aired with the network going so far as to not include the scene in which they appeared in screeners for the press. Upon the episode's release, it was revealed that the guest star was in fact former secretary of state and Democratic presidential nominee Hillary Clinton.

== Release ==
=== Marketing ===
On April 6, 2018, the first photograph of the cast of the new season was released. On May 16, 2018, the first trailer for the series was released. On August 5, 2018, a promo for the season was released featuring the cast going through the table read of the season premiere. On August 23, 2018, another promo for the series was released featuring Brown and Fontana mocking Donald Trump.

=== Distribution ===
In Canada, the season premiered on September 27, 2018, on CityTV. In Australia, it premiered on November 26, 2018, on Network Ten.

== Reception ==
=== Critical response ===
The season was met with a mixed response from critics upon its premiere. On the review aggregation website Rotten Tomatoes, the season holds an approval rating of 45% with an average rating of 6.00 out of 10, based on 47 reviews. The website's critical consensus reads, "This just in: while the nostalgia and wit are welcome, Murphy Brown's dated messaging tactics feel heavy-handed and smug, leaving this formerly formidably timely series feeling like a reboot reaching for the headlines." Metacritic, which uses a weighted average, assigned the season a score of 53 out of 100 based on 28 critics, indicating "mixed or average" reviews.

In a negative review, Variety's Daniel D'Addario was critical of the revival saying, "Murphy Brown 1.0 was a sitcom about what it took to make a good news show — the compromises that go along with that, not all of them journalistic. The supporting characters, once quirky and helpful pals to Murphy, now seem drained: They only pipe up when they have something to say about Trump." In another unfavorable evaluation, Rolling Stone's Alan Sepinwall was similarly dismissive of the season giving it two out of five stars and saying, "The revival, again run by Emmy-winning creator Diane English, is conscious that the world has changed in the 20 years since we last saw Murphy and friends. The problem is that Murphy Brown itself really hasn’t, and that does more to tarnish the real show's legacy than anything else."

In a more positive critique, Indiewire's Liz Shannon Miller awarded the season a grade of "A−" and praised it saying, "Easily the best aspect of Murphy Brown is how it acknowledges the meta elements of its existence without sacrificing the quality of its comedy or breaking the fourth wall...The writing never forgets just what a trash fire the news can be today, but in unleashing Murphy on the world, there’s the faintest glimpse of hope that maybe, just maybe, change is possible." In an additional favorable assessment, the Los Angeles Times' Robert Lloyd said of the season, "It's funny and sweet and true to its roots, if, at times, a little obvious in its aims."

=== Ratings ===
While the first episode of the season showed a marked improvement in ratings in its time slot in comparison to the previous year, the series fell short of the ratings of two other recently revived sitcoms from the 1980s and 90s, Roseanne and Will & Grace. Nielsen, the primary provider of television ratings information to the entertainment industry, later reported that the first episode of the season ranked number one among same-gender couples for the first week of the 2018-19 television season.

Viewership and ratings per episode of Murphy Brown season 11
No.	Title	Air date	Rating/share (18–49)	Viewers (millions)	DVR (18–49)	DVR viewers (millions)	Total (18–49)	Total viewers (millions)
1	"Fake News"	September 27, 2018	1.1/4	7.50	0.7	3.64	1.8	11.15
2	"I (Don't) Heart Huckabee"	October 4, 2018	1.0/4	7.12	0.5	2.83	1.5	9.96
3	"#MurphyToo"	October 11, 2018	1.0/4	6.76	0.4	2.42	1.4	9.19
4	"Three Shirts to the Wind"	October 18, 2018	0.9/4	6.39	0.4	2.40	1.3	8.79
5	"The Girl Who Cried About Wolf"	October 25, 2018	0.8/3	6.05	0.4	2.15	1.2	8.20
6	"Results May Vary"	November 1, 2018	0.8/3	5.94	0.4	2.23	1.2	8.17
7	"A Lifetime of Achievement"	November 8, 2018	0.8/3	6.01	0.4	2.18	1.2	8.19
8	"The Coma and the Oxford Comma"	November 15, 2018	0.9/4	5.96	0.4	2.15	1.3	8.12
9	"Thanksgiving and Taking"	November 22, 2018	0.8/3	4.75	0.4	2.24	1.2	6.99
10	"Beat the Press"	November 29, 2018	0.8/3	5.59	0.3	1.84	1.1	7.44
11	"The Wheels on the Dog Go Round and Round"	December 6, 2018	0.8/3	5.97	—N/a	1.86	—N/a	7.83
12	"AWOL"	December 13, 2018	0.7/3	5.55	0.3	1.68	1.0	7.22
13	"Happy New Year"	December 20, 2018	0.7/3	5.21	0.4	1.78	1.1	7.01

=== Awards and nominations ===
Year	Award	Category	Nominee(s)	Result	Ref.
2019	Golden Globe Awards	Best Actress – Television Series Musical or Comedy	Candice Bergen	Nominated	
2019	Art Directors Guild Awards	Excellence in Production Design for a Multi-Camera Series	Jane Musky (for "#MurphyToo")	Nominated	
