= List of Murphy Brown episodes =

The following is a list of episodes for the American television sitcom Murphy Brown. The series premiered on November 14, 1988, on CBS, and ended on May 18, 1998. A total of 260 episodes have aired, most recently airing its eleventh season. A 13-episode eleventh season revival of the series premiered on September 27, 2018.

== Series overview ==
Season	Episodes	Originally released		Rank	Avg. rating (Note: In households; seasons 1-9)/ Avg. viewers (Note: In millions; seasons 10–11)
Season	Episodes	First released	Last released	Rank	Avg. rating/ Avg. viewers
1	22	November 14, 1988	May 22, 1989	36	14.9
2	27	September 18, 1989	May 21, 1990	26	14.7
3	26	September 17, 1990	May 20, 1991	6	16.9
4	26	September 16, 1991	May 18, 1992	3	18.6
5	25	September 21, 1992	May 17, 1993	4	17.9
6	25	September 20, 1993	May 16, 1994	9	16.3
7	26	September 19, 1994	May 22, 1995	16	14.1
8	24	September 18, 1995	May 20, 1996	18	12.3
9	24	September 16, 1996	May 19, 1997	34	10.4
10	22	October 1, 1997	May 18, 1998	86	9.9
11	13	September 27, 2018	December 20, 2018	35	8.47

== Episodes ==
=== Season 1 (1988–89) ===
No. overall	No. in season	Title	Directed by	Written by	Original release date	U.S. viewers (millions)	Rating/share (households)
1	1	"Respect"	Barnet Kellman	Diane English	November 14, 1988	19.2	14.7/22
Murphy (Candice Bergen) returns to FYI after rehab at the Betty Ford clinic, and isn't sure she still has her edge. In her first week back she deals with Miles, (Grant Shaud) a new young executive producer; Corky, (Faith Ford), a new beauty-queen anchor; Eldin, (Robert Pastorelli), a hard-to-reach housepainter; and a publicity-seeking interview subject (Tony Goldwyn) who wants to avoid the one question on everyone's mind.
2	2	"Devil with a Blue Dress On"	Barnet Kellman	Korby Siamis	November 21, 1988	16.3	12.0/18
Miles assigns Corky to help Murphy's story on a stonewalling businessman. When Corky uncovers his ability to slip through customs unchecked, and Murphy finds drug-smuggling under it, she almost feels guilty about taking credit for the story. But on air, Corky "grabs the brass ring."
3	3	"Nowhere to Run"	Barnet Kellman	Russ Woody	November 28, 1988	23.6	15.5/22
Murphy investigates a federal prosecutor who's linked to mob-run prostitution. Miles fears for his life when he receives his first death threat.
4	4	"Signed, Sealed, Delivered"	Barnet Kellman	Diane English	December 5, 1988	20.4	13.6/20
Miles schedules Murphy to interview her radical ex-husband, Jake Loewenstein (Robin Thomas). Murphy and Jake's feelings for one another begin to ruin the chance for a professional interview.
5	5	"Murphy's Pony"	Barnet Kellman	Diane English	December 11, 1988	19.6	14.0/21
During the Christmas holidays, a mother abandons her children to the care of Murphy Brown. Murphy goes all out to help them out.
6	6	"Baby Love"	Barnet Kellman	Korby Siamis	December 12, 1988	19.7	14.1/21
Murphy feels maternal pangs after visiting with a pregnant friend. She considers in vitro fertilization and talks Frank into being the donor. When that option doesn't pan out, they consider a physical union.
7	7	"Set Me Free"	Barnet Kellman	Diane English	December 19, 1988	21.0	15.0/23
Murphy's having a rotten day, complicated by a gunman who interrupts the show and demands they read his statement on the air and it gets capped off by the painter she hired to do her kitchen sticking around to finish "extending myself."
8	8	"And So She Goes"	Barnet Kellman	Denise Moss & Sy Dukane	January 2, 1989	27.1	19.1/28
Murphy's longtime nemesis asks for her to deliver the eulogy at his funeral, and Murphy sees it as her chance to have the last laugh or so she thinks.
9	9	"I Would Have Danced All Night"	Barnet Kellman	Steven Peterman & Gary Dontzig	January 9, 1989	24.4	17.4/25
Murphy is perplexed and angry when everyone on the staff is invited to the inaugural ball of President-elect Bush. Was it something she reported? Miles debates about asking a taller woman to the ball.
10	10	"Kyle"	Barnet Kellman	Russ Woody	January 16, 1989	19.4	14.0/21
Murphy's story wins freedom for an innocent man (Leslie Jordan); when the rest of the team realizes he has a problem adjusting with the outside world, Miles offers him a job as Murphy's secretary.
11	11	"Off the Job Experience"	Barnet Kellman	Tom Seeley & Norm Gunzenhauser	January 23, 1989	23.7	16.2/24
Miles suspends Murphy for her handling of an interview. She leaves the office for two weeks and becomes miserable.
12	12	"Why Do Fools Fall in Love?"	Barnet Kellman	Korby Siamis	February 13, 1989	20.2	14.2/21
Cupid strikes the staff when Murphy reluctantly fixes Frank up on the condition he finds someone for her. Murphy's latest secretary has a crush on Jim.
13	13	"Soul Man"	Barnet Kellman	Tom Seeley & Norm Gunzenhauser	February 20, 1989	20.2	14.0/21
Murphy tries to gain entry into Washington's last exclusive club; trouble is, it's for men only. Murphy tries to get Jim to sponsor her when she discovers a loophole in the by-laws.
14	14	"It’s How You Play the Game"	Barnet Kellman	Russ Woody	February 27, 1989	20.2	14.3/21
To get the public to see Frank's piece on the homeless, the FYI team competes with Jerry Gold's show on its level, with surprising results.
15	15	"Mama Said"	Barnet Kellman	Diane English	March 6, 1989	20.5	14.7/21
Murphy's overbearing mother (Colleen Dewhurst) comes to visit for an unspecified length of time.
16	16	"Moscow on the Potomac"	Barnet Kellman	Sy Dukane & Denise Moss	March 13, 1989	22.8	16.2/25
Murphy prepares for a joint broadcast with the Soviet news equivalent of Murphy Brown (Robin Strasser).
17	17	"My Dinner with Einstein"	Barnet Kellman	Gary Dontzig & Steven Peterman	March 20, 1989	20.8	15.6/22
Murphy dates a physicist (Buck Henry) to prove looks aren't everything, but he proves to be a party guy.
18	18	"Funnies Girl"	Barnet Kellman	Tom Seeley & Norm Gunzenhauser	April 10, 1989	20.8	15.0/23
An on-camera slip of the tongue, makes Murphy the butt of a cartoonist's joke in "The Adventures of Mouthy Brown," then the rest of the staff falls victim.
19	19	"The Unshrinkable Murphy Brown"	Barnet Kellman	Denise Moss & Sy Dukane	May 1, 1989	20.3	14.3/23
While Murphy is grilling him on the show, a judge dies of a heart attack. This causes Murphy to lose her edge, so she attends a group therapy session.
20	20	"The Summer of '77"	Barnet Kellman	Diane English	May 8, 1989	18.2	13.3/20
Eldin meets Corky for the first time and becomes infatuated with her. Phil reflects on the first time he met Murphy, when she first came to Washington to audition against Linda Ellerbee & Frank Fontana for FYI.
21	21	"The Bickners"	Barnet Kellman	Russ Woody	May 15, 1989	17.2	12.4/19
A minor traffic accident with a sweet elderly couple results in a $1.5 million lawsuit for Murphy.
22	22	"The Morning Show"	Barnet Kellman	Kathryn Baker	May 22, 1989	17.8	12.7/21
During an off week at FYI, Murphy & Corky co-anchor the network's morning show; Murphy finds it's a job she just isn't made for. Murphy's new secretary has a passing resemblance to a "dead" celebrity.

=== Season 2 (1989–90) ===
No. overall	No. in season	Title	Directed by	Written by	Original release date	U.S. viewers (millions)
23	1	"The Brothers Silverberg"	Barnet Kellman	Diane English	September 18, 1989	23.9
When Miles' older brother, Josh (Jon Tenney), visits, he and Murphy discover a mutual attraction. Jane Leeves makes her first appearance as Miles' girlfriend Audrey.
24	2	"Anchors Away"	Barnet Kellman	Kathryn Baker	September 25, 1989	23.0
The network sends Jim to Libya for two weeks, so they can audition a handsome new anchor (Christopher Rich) for FYI; they don't count on the retaliation of Murphy and the gang.
25	3	"The Memo that Got Away"	Barnet Kellman	Denise Moss & Sy Dukane	October 2, 1989	19.6
A high-school computer hacker stumbles onto a memo by Murphy about her co-workers; he plans to publish it in the school paper.
26	4	"TV or Not TV"	Barnet Kellman	Craig Hoffman	October 16, 1989	20.2
An FYI-inspired sitcom sends its star (Morgan Fairchild) to Washington to research her part: Murphy Brown. Special appearance by Connie Chung.
27	5	"Miles' Big Adventure"	Barnet Kellman	Tom Seeley & Norm Gunzenhauser	October 23, 1989	21.4
While on vacation, Miles' return flight is delayed by an Air Force pilot who has hijacked an F15-Eagle loaded with nuclear warheads.
28	6	"Buddies Schmuddies"	Barnet Kellman	Russ Woody	October 30, 1989	19.6
Frank and Murphy compete for the same story, but their intense competition puts the story in jeopardy. Phil—to improve his business at night—tries adding live entertainment to the bar.
29	7	"Whose Garbage is it Anyway?"	Barnet Kellman	Sy Dukane & Denise Moss	November 6, 1989	18.8
Jerry Gold bets the staff that they can't be environmentally responsible for a two-week period; if they lose, Murphy must appear on his show.
30	8	"And the Whiner Is..."	Barnet Kellman	Kathryn Baker	November 13, 1989	19.8
Murphy & Frank lose the Humboldt Award to Corky. Then to ride the PR wave, the network brass decides to give next week's lead story to the award winner. Alex Rocco crosses over in his role from The Famous Teddy Z.
31	9	"Roasted"	Barnet Kellman	Tom Seeley & Norm Gunzenhauser	November 20, 1989	21.3
The staff plans a surprise roast for Jim on his 25th anniversary at the network, he tells Murphy before the event that he "couldn't handle a chance meeting with anyone I know." Special appearances by Irving R. Levine and Walter Cronkite.
32	10	"Brown Like Me"	Barnet Kellman	Diane English	November 27, 1989	20.0
33	11	"Brown Like Me"	Barnet Kellman	Diane English	November 27, 1989	20.0
Murphy is set to receive the Robert F. Kennedy Journalism Award, so the rest of the staff convince her that at least one of her estranged parents should attend. She concedes and invites her father (Darren McGavin). Sparks fly when her father arrives with his new young wife and child, and later her mother shows up.
34	12	"The Strike"	Barnet Kellman	Steven Peterman & Gary Dontzig	December 11, 1989	21.2
To start a significant dialog, Murphy decides she will break the technicians' strike by bringing both sides together for cake and conversation.
35	13	"Here's to You Mrs. Kinsella"	Barnet Kellman	Russ Woody	December 18, 1989	26.3
While Murphy is throwing a birthday party for Gene Kinsella, Miles recognizes a woman he had a one-night stand with at a broadcaster's convention: Mrs. Kinsella. However, Kinsella thinks that his wife is having an affair with Frank.
36	14	"What Are You Doing New Year's Eve?"	Barnet Kellman	Diane English	January 1, 1990	27.4
Corky is having a New Year's Eve party, and Murphy wants to avoid it. Everyone challenges her to be able to enjoy the occasion without her old vice. Sober, Murphy can still bring life to a dull party.
37	15	"Subpoena Envy"	Barnet Kellman	Denise Moss & Sy Dukane	January 8, 1990	25.8
Murphy is subpoenaed to appear before a grand jury, but instead of divulging her source she goes to jail. Prison is not what she hoped for or expected, but then neither is the duration of her stay.
38	16	"I Want My FYI"	Barnet Kellman	Tom Seeley & Norm Gunzenhauser	January 29, 1990	22.6
Miles asks the staff to be mentors for a group of young reporters who will be doing a pilot for an FYI-type program for kids; Murphy over helps her protégée (Mayim Bialik). Guest starring Mark-Paul Gosselaar.
39	17	"Frankly Speaking"	Barnet Kellman	Gary Dontzig & Steven Peterman	February 5, 1990	23.0
Frank meets the woman of his dreams, a woman he dates more than once. However, she is a psychologist and analyzes every little thing Frank does, something that drives him crazier than he already is.
40	18	"The Murphy Brown School of Broadcasting"	Barnet Kellman	Marilyn Anderson & Billy Riback	February 12, 1990	14.2
Murphy's journalism mentor from her high school days (William Schallert) has retired. To combat inactivity, he comes to Washington to open a journalism school using her name.
41	19	"Bad Girls"	Barnet Kellman	Gary Dontzig & Steven Peterman	February 19, 1990	20.8
It's February and sweeps month, so Miles gets Murphy and Corky to pose as hookers to break open an oil company scandal.
42	20	"Heart of Gold"	Barnet Kellman	Russ Woody	February 26, 1990	23.9
When Murphy learns things about Jerry Gold that no one else is privy to, she looks at him in a different light. They begin to have an affair that shocks everyone at FYI.
43	21	"On the Road Again"	Barnet Kellman	Sy Dukane & Denise Moss	March 5, 1990	23.1
On a publicity jaunt, Murphy and Jim find themselves snowbound in Kansas. While killing time in the bar, Murphy challenges Jim's ability to flirt, something Jim may later regret.
44	22	"But First a Word from Our Sponsor"	Barnet Kellman	Craig Hoffman	March 19, 1990	20.9
A worried viewer urges advertisers to boycott FYI for an upcoming piece Murphy has on sex education. Murphy flies out to keep the one sponsor they have for the controversial show.
45	23	"Frank's Appendectomy"	Barnet Kellman	Tom Seeley & Norm Gunzenhauser	April 9, 1990	21.6
A series of outrageous practical jokes—starting with a visit from "Deep Throat"—get out of hand.
46	24	"Fax or Fiction"	Barnet Kellman	Chris R. Westphal & Deborah Markoe-Klein	April 30, 1990	21.9
When a secret admirer sends a fax to Miles, Murphy takes it as a challenge to answer for him and then winds up starting a correspondence. Guest starring Teri Hatcher.
47	25	"The Bitch's Back"	Barnet Kellman	Gary Dontzig & Steven Peterman	May 7, 1990	19.7
Miles orders the staff to take a stress reduction class. Murphy slips a disc after reluctantly showing up for it; however, that doesn't stop her from working on a hot story. Guest starring Loretta Devine and Romy Rosemont as Murphy's nurses.
48	26	"Going to the Chapel: Part 1"	Barnet Kellman	Diane English & Korby Siamis	May 14, 1990	24.2
When a "geek" from her high school days comes to Washington, Corky's mother (Alice Hirson) & his mother arrange to have them get together. They meet, fall in love, and within two weeks announce their plans to get married. Corky runs out into the night with Eldin, however, when she thinks that maybe she hasn't really experienced life.
49	27	"Going to the Chapel: Part 2"	Barnet Kellman	Diane English & Korby Siamis	May 21, 1990	26.7
Upon returning, Corky decides to go ahead with the wedding, but the event is marred by even more last minute indecision, and then Murphy brings out the "soul." Special appearance by Frances Bergen as Mrs. Forrest. Also guest starring: Leeza Gibbons, John Tesh, Kathleen Sullivan and The Temptations.

=== Season 3 (1990–91) ===
No. overall	No. in season	Title	Directed by	Written by	Original release date	U.S. viewers (millions)
50	1	"The 390th Broadcast"	Barnet Kellman	Diane English	September 17, 1990	27.7
With the start of the 13th season, Miles decides it's time to change the image of FYI, so he hires a consultant (Harry Shearer).
51	2	"Brown and Blue"	Barnet Kellman	Sy Dukane & Denise Moss	September 24, 1990	26.0
Murphy wants to interview a controversial comic (Michael Chiklis), but after seeing some tapes of his act, she changes her mind. Miles sets up the interview anyway so Murphy decides to go ahead with it, the result of which makes for interesting viewing.
52	3	"Loco Hero"	Barnet Kellman	Steven Peterman & Gary Dontzig	October 1, 1990	25.6
Frank rescues people trapped in a hostage situation, but falls to pieces when his parents (Rose Marie and Barney Martin) come to town to celebrate their 50th wedding anniversary, a party Frank forgot to plan.
53	4	"Strike Two"	Barnet Kellman	Scott Kaufer	October 15, 1990	22.5
The on-air talent goes on strike, so management brings in Miller Redfield to handle Murphy's pending interview on the S&L crisis. When the only question Miller wants to know is why parking isn't validated, Miles must do the interview.
54	5	"The Gold Rush"	Barnet Kellman	Steven Peterman & Gary Dontzig	October 22, 1990	26.4
Jerry Gold joins FYI where, in a new feature, he goes "Nose to Nose" with Murphy and the sparks fly, then the fire is rekindled and the sparks fade away.
55	6	"Bob & Murphy & Ted & Avery"	Barnet Kellman	Diane English	November 5, 1990	26.9
Avery comes to stay with Murphy when she decides it's time to "change the scenery of my existence"; Murphy suggests she gets a boyfriend. Two hours later, she has a double date for herself and Murphy.
56	7	"The Last Laugh"	Barnet Kellman	Tom Palmer	November 12, 1990	24.5
Jim goes into hiding after losing control on the air, fearing the only thing people will remember about him is that one moment in his long career.
57	8	"Rootless People"	Barnet Kellman	Story by : Lisa Chernin and Sy Dukane & Denise Moss; Teleplay by : Sy Dukane & Denise Moss	November 19, 1990	25.7
Finished early with her story, Murphy terrorizes the rest of the staff with her practical jokes. When a gang of environmental terrorists kidnap her, nobody believes her.
58	9	"The Bummer of 42"	Barnet Kellman	Tom Palmer	November 26, 1990	26.0
Murphy gets a fake sister (Christine Ebersole) for her birthday and can't seem to shake her.
59	10	"Trouble in Sherwood-Forrest"	Barnet Kellman	Sy Dukane & Denise Moss	December 10, 1990	20.2
Murphy suggests that Corky throw a dinner party to save her marriage.
60	11	"Jingle Hell, Jingle Hell, Jingle All the Way"	Barnet Kellman	Gary Dontzig & Steven Peterman	December 17, 1990	21.1
The FYI crew decides to spend Christmas giving donations to charity rather than exchanging gifts, but Murphy buys presents anyway.
61	12	"Retreat"	Barnet Kellman	Tom Palmer	January 7, 1991	30.2
The FYI crew goes on a camping trip, but most of them just whine about the outdoors.
62	13	"Eldin Imitates Life"	Barnet Kellman	Peter Tolan	January 14, 1991	26.5
Murphy worries that Eldin's success as an artist will lead him to quit.
63	14	"Contractions"	Barnet Kellman	Scott Kaufer	January 21, 1991	29.0
As her contract nears its end, Murphy is offered a new job at the Wolf Network.
64	15	"Hoarse Play"	Barnet Kellman	Steven Peterman & Gary Dontzig	February 4, 1991	27.3
Murphy contracts laryngitis just as Miles bets she can get a quote at a Presidential news conference.
65	16	"The Novel"	Barnet Kellman	Korby Siamis	February 11, 1991	24.9
Murphy discovers that she's the basis for the love interest in Jim's novel.
66	17	"Terror on the 17th Floor"	Barnet Kellman	Sy Dukane & Denise Moss	February 18, 1991	27.3
After FYI is taken over by a conglomerate, a ruthless vice president is sent to do budget cuts—and Murphy is chosen to give her the business. Special Guest Kevin Conroy
67	18	"On Another Plane"	Barnet Kellman	Diane English	February 25, 1991	28.4
68	19	"On Another Plane"	Barnet Kellman	Diane English	February 25, 1991	28.4
Murphy and Frank see their lives flashing before their eyes when their plane develops engine trouble.
69	20	"Driving Miss Crazy"	Barnet Kellman	Tom Palmer	March 4, 1991	25.0
Corky puts a stop to her fellow car-poolers' jokes about her intelligence.
70	21	"Everytime it Rains... You Get Wet"	Barnet Kellman	Gary Dontzig & Steven Peterman	March 18, 1991	24.1
Miles wants the FYI team to present a feel-good story, but all they can deliver is bad news.
71	22	"Corky's Place"	Barnet Kellman	Tom Palmer	April 8, 1991	24.1
Corky wants Murphy as a guest on her first television special, but Murphy wants nothing to do with it.
72	23	"Small"	Peter Bonerz	Denise Moss & Sy Dukane	April 29, 1991	18.7
Murphy gets into big trouble for making a little joke about short men. Special appearance by Paula Zahn.
73	24	"The Usual Suspects"	Peter Bonerz	Sam Austin	May 6, 1991	21.3
Murphy goes around the globe to find out who on her team would reveal a story about her to a tabloid.
74	25	"Q&A on FYI"	Barnet Kellman	Peter Tolan	May 13, 1991	22.4
The FYI team competes against college whiz kids on a TV quiz show.
75	26	"Uh-Oh: Part 1"	Barnet Kellman	Story by : Korby Siamis & Diane English; Teleplay by : Diane English	May 20, 1991	28.8
Murphy's radical ex-husband Jake (Robin Thomas) and ex-lover Jerry (Jay Thomas) both re-enter her life, each hoping to resume their respective relationships with her.

=== Season 4 (1991–92) ===
No. overall	No. in season	Title	Directed by	Written by	Original release date	U.S. viewers (millions)
76	1	"Uh-Oh: Part 2"	Peter Bonerz	Story by : Diane English & Korby Siamis; Teleplay by : Diane English	September 16, 1991	34.0
77	2	"Uh-Oh: Part 3"	Peter Bonerz	Story by : Diane English & Korby Siamis; Teleplay by : Diane English	September 16, 1991	34.0
Murphy fears she may be pregnant after her encounters with her ex-husband Jake and her ex-lover Jerry. A series of home pregnancy tests proves her right.
78	3	"I'm As Much of a Man As I Ever Was"	Peter Bonerz	Steven Peterman & Gary Dontzig	September 23, 1991	28.6
In spite of her pregnancy, Murphy is determined to get a quote from the President while jogging.
79	4	"Male Call"	Peter Bonerz	Michael Patrick King	September 30, 1991	27.2
Murphy goes to a male-bonding workshop to interview the guru of a men's movement.
80	5	"The Square Triangle"	Peter Bonerz	Peter Tolan	October 7, 1991	28.3
Murphy hires Miles' girlfriend Audrey as a secretary and Frank may score a date with her when Miles feels suffocated.
81	6	"Full Circle"	Peter Bonerz	Diane English	October 14, 1991	28.3
Murphy tries to patch things up with her father when her mother passes away.
82	7	"The Smiths Go to Washington"	Peter Bonerz	Michael Patrick King	October 28, 1991	25.1
The FYI team tries to acquire a videotape of a senator's indiscretion from a Midwestern family.
83	8	"It Came From College"	Peter Bonerz	Anne Beatts	November 4, 1991	26.0
Murphy learns a lesson in parenting when a friend's daughter (Anne Heche) stops by.
84	9	"The Queen of Soul"	Peter Bonerz	Tom Palmer	November 11, 1991	28.7
Murphy asks for Aretha Franklin on FYI and is forced to stall when Miss Franklin is delayed.
85	10	"Inside Murphy Brown"	Peter Bonerz	Gary Dontzig & Steven Peterman	November 18, 1991	27.9
Murphy has an appointment for a chorionic villus sampling (CVS) test to determine the sex of her baby and to check for any genetic abnormalities. However, she needs someone to drive her to and from the gynecologist's office, so she asks a very reluctant Jim to take her since everyone else is busy. In the end, Murphy is relieved to discover that her baby is healthy, but she is also shocked and disappointed to discover that her baby is a boy and not the girl that she was expecting.
86	11	"Mission Control"	Peter Baldwin	Michael Patrick King	November 25, 1991	30.7
Murphy has a lot on her platter when she tries to prepare a Thanksgiving dinner at a mission.
87	12	"Be it Ever So Humboldt"	Peter Baldwin	Peter Tolan	December 9, 1991	25.7
Frank finally wins a Humboldt award—and develops a cocky attitude as a result of his victory.
88	13	"Love is Blonde"	Peter Baldwin	Tom Palmer	December 16, 1991	26.3
Corky considers having an affair with empty-headed ex-anchor Miller Redfield (Christopher Rich) while Will is in Hollywood.
89	14	"Anchor Rancor"	Peter Baldwin	Eugene Stein	January 6, 1992	29.0
Jim and Murphy lower themselves to a game of one-upmanship for a part-time anchor slot.
90	15	"Guess Who's Coming to Luncheon"	Peter Baldwin	Tom Palmer	January 13, 1992	27.8
Corky is asked to a White House luncheon, leading Murphy to try getting an invitation as well.
91	16	"Lovesick"	Peter Baldwin	Steven Peterman & Gary Dontzig	January 20, 1992	28.7
Upon returning home after being on assignment in England, Murphy begins to feel ill and is put on bed rest for two weeks after her doctor diagnoses her with preterm labor pains, and Jerry Gold moving in to take care of her only aggravates the situation.
92	17	"Heartfelt"	Lee Shallat	Michael Patrick King	February 3, 1992	27.6
Murphy throws a 30th birthday party for Miles with a theme that could increase his stress.
93	18	"Send in the Clowns"	Lee Shallat	Peter Tolan	February 24, 1992	27.2
Murphy faces a Senate committee to defend her right to free speech.
94	19	"Murphy Buys the Farm"	Lee Shallat	Tom Palmer	March 2, 1992	29.0
Murphy takes the FYI crew to a farm she may buy, but is forced to put up with their boredom.
95	20	"Come Out, Come Out, Wherever You Are"	Lee Shallat	Gary Dontzig & Steven Peterman	March 4, 1992	16.9
Miles fears he might be gay when he dreams about frolicking with the new publicity guy, Rick (Brian McNamara).
96	21	"Rage Before Beauty"	Lee Shallat	Peter Tolan	March 16, 1992	31.0
The network freaks out over Murphy's messed-up hair.
97	22	"Phil's Not So Silent Partner"	Lee Shallat	Tom Palmer	March 23, 1992	28.0
A friendship is at risk when Phil asks Murphy not to tell anyone that the bar is in financial trouble.
98	23	"He-Ho, He-Ho, It's Off to Lamaze We Go"	Peter Bonerz	Steven Peterman & Gary Dontzig	April 27, 1992	27.0
At her doctor's urging, Murphy enrolls in Lamaze class with Eldin acting as her coach. While at class, she alienates her teacher and classmates with her wiseacre repartee, but luckily for her, Eldin pays attention.
99	24	"On the Rocks"	Peter Bonerz	Ron Lux & Eugene Stein	May 4, 1992	27.9
Murphy is replaced by an anchorwoman from Toronto (Kate Mulgrew) whom she suspects is an alcoholic.
100	25	"A Chance of Showers"	Peter Bonerz	Michael Patrick King	May 11, 1992	30.0
Murphy has self-doubts when several news anchors come to town for her baby shower. Special appearances by Katie Couric, Faith Daniels, Joan Lunden, Mary Alice Williams and Paula Zahn.
101	26	"Birth 101"	Barnet Kellman	Korby Siamis & Diane English	May 18, 1992	33.7
During FYI's season finale, Murphy goes into labor on the air, just as she still tries to wrap her mind around the fact that she's having a baby.

=== Season 5 (1992–93) ===
No. overall	No. in season	Title	Directed by	Written by	Original release date	U.S. viewers (millions)
102	1	"You Say Potatoe, I Say Potato"	Peter Bonerz	Story by : Steven Peterman & Gary Dontzig & Korby Siamis; Teleplay by : Gary Dontzig & Steven Peterman	September 21, 1992	44.0
103	2	"You Say Potatoe, I Say Potato"	Peter Bonerz	Story by : Steven Peterman & Gary Dontzig & Korby Siamis; Teleplay by : Gary Dontzig & Steven Peterman	September 21, 1992	44.0
Murphy deals with criticism from Vice-President Dan Quayle about being a single parent. TV Guide ranked this episode #64 on its 2009 list of 100 Top Episodes.
104	3	"Life After Birth"	Peter Bonerz	Peter Tolan	September 28, 1992	30.9
The gang is not particularly happy when Murphy comes back to work with a bunch of stuffed animals after hiring a new nanny.
105	4	"Black, White & Brown"	Peter Bonerz	Michael Patrick King	October 5, 1992	27.5
Kinsella's sexy replacement plans big changes at FYI.
106	5	"I Never Sang for My Husband"	Peter Bonerz	Tom Palmer	October 12, 1992	27.5
Doris, feeling that her life is miserable, decides to become a cabaret singer and Jim has a hard time dealing with it.
107	6	"Night of Living News"	Peter Bonerz	Lee Aronsohn	October 26, 1992	26.3
Frank talks Murphy into co-hosting the late-night news with him.
108	7	"A Year to Remember"	Peter Bonerz	Michael Patrick King	November 2, 1992	20.3
Each of the staffers at FYI remember their own first experiences on Election Day.
109	8	"Midnight Plane to Paris"	Peter Bonerz	Lee Aronsohn	November 9, 1992	28.2
Murphy feels guilty for leaving her son behind when she gets an assignment in Paris.
110	9	"Me Thinks My Parents Doth Protest Too Much"	Peter Bonerz	Tom Palmer	November 16, 1992	25.3
Miles' activist parents (Richard Libertini and Kelly Bishop) show up to protest against an oil company.
111	10	"Winners Take All"	Peter Bonerz	Barbara Wallace & Thomas R. Wolfe	November 23, 1992	25.3
The staff of FYI is honored with an award, but they end up squabbling at their tribute dinner.
112	11	"Till Death or Next Thursday Do We Part"	Peter Bonerz	Peter Tolan	December 7, 1992	22.9
When Will is accused of plagiarism, Corky must read excerpts from her diary in court to prove his innocence.
113	12	"I'm Dreaming of a Brown Christmas"	Lee Shallat	Gary Dontzig & Steven Peterman	December 14, 1992	25.2
Murphy hosts a Christmas for the staff of FYI and two feuding relatives. Guest starring Marian Seldes as Aunt Brooke.
114	13	"Games Mother Play"	Peter Bonerz	Steven Peterman & Gary Dontzig	January 4, 1993	27.2
Murphy heads a children's group in order to spend more time with Avery.
115	14	"The British Invasion"	Lee Shallat	Peter Tolan	January 11, 1993	28.7
Audrey's old boyfriend (Trevor Goddard) stops by just as she moves in with Miles.
116	15	"Back to the Ball"	Lee Shallat	Dinah Kirgo	January 18, 1993	28.9
The staff of FYI tries to find a date for Murphy for the Inaugural Ball. Guest starring Charles Shaughnessy as Murphy's date, Michael.
117	16	"The Intern"	Lee Shallat	Tom Palmer	February 1, 1993	28.5
The new intern—a member of Corky's sorority—is not what everyone expected.
118	17	"Trickster, We Hardly Knew Ye"	Lee Shallat	Michael Patrick King	February 8, 1993	24.7
The staff of FYI holds a memorial service for Jim's recently deceased dog.
119	18	"The World According to Avery"	Lee Shallat	Lee Aronsohn	February 15, 1993	25.2
Murphy takes Avery to work where the staff of FYI gets to know him.
120	19	"Bump in the Night"	Lee Shallat	Peter Tolan	February 22, 1993	24.2
Murphy accompanies Frank when he's invited to appear on the Letterman show. Guest starring Teri Garr, with a special appearance by David Letterman.
121	20	"To Market, to Market"	Lee Shallat	Tom Palmer	March 1, 1993	25.8
The staff of FYI go to the market to buy baby food for Avery and meet a nun.
122	21	"Two For the Road"	Joe Regalbuto	Michael Patrick King & Peter Tolan	March 15, 1993	25.8
Murphy and Mitchell get stranded while on a road trip when the car breaks down.
123	22	"Murphy and the Amazing Leaping Man"	Lee Shallat	Michael Patrick King	March 22, 1993	25.8
As an improvement on his life, Frank gets a girlfriend and new furniture.
124	23	"The Egg & I"	Lee Shallat	Lee Aronsohn	May 3, 1993	21.6
Murphy attends the White House's Easter egg hunt in order to get an interview with the President.
125	24	"Ship of Phil's"	Lee Shallat	Bill Diamond & Michael Saltzman	May 10, 1993	19.4
On their annual poker night, Murphy bets her Porsche for Phil's boat. Special vocal appearance by Walter Cronkite.
126	25	"One"	Lee Shallat	Steven Peterman & Gary Dontzig & Korby Siamis	May 17, 1993	24.1
Murphy gets herself lost in New York forcing her to miss Avery's first birthday party. Special appearance by Barry Manilow.

=== Season 6 (1993–94) ===
No. overall	No. in season	Title	Directed by	Written by	Original release date	U.S. viewers (millions)
127	1	"The More Things Change"	Peter Bonerz	Story by : Gary Dontzig & Steven Peterman & Korby Siamis; Teleplay by : Gary Dontzig & Steven Peterman	September 20, 1993	25.1
The BBC films a piece on FYI. Peter Hunt (Scott Bakula) joins FYI as a new anchor.
128	2	"Angst For the Memories"	Peter Bonerz	Rob Bragin	September 27, 1993	25.3
Miles gets a counterculture hero (Martin Sheen) to appear on FYI.
129	3	"Black and White and Read All Over"	Peter Bonerz	Eileen Heisler & DeAnn Heline	October 4, 1993	25.1
Murphy and Mitchell get together.
130	4	"Political Correctness"	Peter Bonerz	Gary Dontzig & Steven Peterman & Korby Siamis	October 11, 1993	24.7
Miles forces the staff of FYI to attend a seminar on cultural sensitivity.
131	5	"The Young & the Rest of Us"	Peter Bonerz	Adam Belanoff	October 18, 1993	23.0
Corky feels blue on her 30th birthday.
132	6	"Ticket to Writhe"	Peter Bonerz	Nell Scovell	October 25, 1993	22.2
Miles intends to propose to Audrey during a Redskins game, unaware that she's planning to move back to England.
133	7	"I Don't Know You From Madam"	Peter Bonerz	Adam Belanoff	November 1, 1993	22.4
Murphy is assigned to do a report on a woman who runs a prostitution ring.
134	8	"All the Life That's Fit to Print"	Peter Bonerz	Bill Diamond & Michael Saltzman	November 8, 1993	20.7
A biographer wants to write a book about Murphy. Special appearances by Ed Bradley, Bob Dole, Linda Ellerbee, Orrin Hatch, Steve Kroft, Charles Kuralt, Sally Jessy Raphael, Morley Safer, Alan Simpson, Lesley Stahl and Mike Wallace.
135	9	"Bah Humboldt"	Peter Bonerz	Nell Scovell	November 15, 1993	24.7
Murphy, Frank and Peter are nominated for the Humboldt Award.
136	10	"Reaper Madness"	Peter Bonerz	Rob Bragin	November 22, 1993	21.2
Murphy gets obsessed with death when she reads about it in Avery's baby book.
137	11	"It's Not Easy Being Brown"	Peter Bonerz	DeAnn Heline & Eileen Heisler	November 29, 1993	21.8
Murphy hires a publicist who gets her booked on a children's TV show.
138	12	"To Have and Have Not"	Peter Bonerz	Colleen Taber & Ellen Svaco	December 6, 1993	22.8
Miles discovers that fame isn't as great as it sounds when he's misquoted in a local magazine.
139	13	"Sox and the Single Girl"	Peter Bonerz	Bill Diamond & Michael Saltzman	December 13, 1993	22.3
Murphy goes to a luncheon at the White House and accidentally brings the President's cat, Sox, home in her car. Special appearance by Joan Lunden.
140	14	"A Piece of the Auction"	Lee Shallat	Rob Bragin	January 3, 1994	25.5
Crass radio talk show host Marty Crane (Dennis Boutsikaris) takes aim at Murphy for being tough, mean, cold, and female, and then pays $10,000 to buy a day with her in a celebrity auction. They soon find out that they're more alike than either one of them thought.
141	15	"The Thrill of the Hunt"	Barnet Kellman	Adam Belanoff	January 10, 1994	24.0
Peter Hunt is back, with a broken arm. Is he angling to be rehired at FYI? Or is he interested in Murphy?
142	16	"The Deal of the Art"	Lee Shallat	Lisa Albert	January 17, 1994	27.0
After Murphy makes snide comments about modern art, she has to debate a group of artists and critics on PBS. Is a pile of sweeteners art just because important people say so? Murphy tests the critics with one of Avery's finger paintings. Guest starring Harriet Sansom Harris and Ian Abercrombie as two critics on Murphy's panel.
143	17	"The Anchorman"	Alan Rafkin	Bill Diamond & Michael Saltzman	January 24, 1994	25.1
It's tax time. Corky gets a refund, Miles has a computer crash, and Jim invests in a piano bar to fulfill a lifelong dream—and then discovers it's a gay bar.
144	18	"Fjord Eyes Only"	Lee Shallat	Eileen Heisler & DeAnn Heline	January 31, 1994	25.2
The team travel to cover the Lillehammer Olympics. Murphy's interview leads the top Norwegian skater to withdraw on the eve of the competition. Jim is sick for the first time since 1976.
145	19	"Crime Story"	Lee Shallat	Rob Bragin & Nell Scovell	February 28, 1994	24.7
FYI examines the issue of rising crime after Murphy's car is stolen. Guest starring Barbara Billingsley and Tom Poston as two of Murphy's neighbors.
146	20	"The Fifth Anchor"	Lee Shallat	Nell Scovell	March 7, 1994	25.2
The team choose clips for their 17th anniversary show and decide to get former correspondents to visit the set. Peter Hunt and Jerry Gold are unavailable—but what about Stuart Best (Wallace Shawn), who did six shows back in the day? The guy that Murphy, Jim, and Frank ganged up on to get rid of?
147	21	"Anything But Cured"	Lee Shallat	Russ Woody	March 14, 1994	23.5
Frank's shrink decides that seven years is long enough: he's cured. Murphy has the best secretary she ever has or ever will have: #66, Carol (Marcia Wallace), who used to work for some shrink in Chicago. Guest starring Richard Schiff and Bob Newhart.
148	22	"The Tip of the Silverburg"	Lee Shallat	Nell Scovell & Rob Bragin	March 28, 1994	23.8
Murphy takes Miles shopping and accidentally sees him naked from the waist down.
149	23	"It's Just Like Riding a Bike"	Lee Shallat	DeAnn Heline & Eileen Heisler	May 2, 1994	19.6
Peter Hunt comes back to town to pursue his relationship with Murphy.
150	24	"My Movie with Louis"	John Rich	Bill Diamond & Michael Saltzman	May 9, 1994	17.9
Over the network's objections, Murphy takes a small "but pivotal" role when Louis Malle (playing himself) films a political thriller in DC. Guest stars Garry Marshall as network head Stan Lansing.
151	25	"The More Things Stay the Same"	Alan Rafkin	Korby Siamis & Steven Peterman & Gary Dontzig	May 16, 1994	21.7
Jim, Frank, and Murphy renegotiate their contracts and imagine alternative careers during the run-up to FYI's 500th show.

=== Season 7 (1994–95) ===
No. overall	No. in season	Title	Directed by	Written by	Original release date	U.S. viewers (millions)
152	1	"Brown vs. the Board of Education"	Peter Bonerz	Rob Bragin	September 19, 1994	18.9
Murphy tries to impress the board members of the prestigious "Ducky Lucky Pre-School," by inviting them to a celebrity filled party.
153	2	"Where Have You Gone, Joe DiMaggio?"	Peter Bonerz	Michael Saltzman	September 26, 1994	21.5
A media frenzy ensues when famous ex-astronaut "Danger Duke" Robinson is wanted for questioning in the murder of his brother.
154	3	"Loose Affiliations"	Peter Bonerz	Elaine Pope & John Bowman	October 3, 1994	20.3
Murphy bad mouths the network's new fall line-up and as a result, the staff is forced to attend an affiliate's meeting.
155	4	"Be Careful What You Wish For"	Peter Bonerz	Adam Belanoff	October 10, 1994	21.6
Corky's handling of a tough interview impresses her colleagues, but it isn't a hit with her fans; she invites a few of the hate mail writers to the FYI offices.
156	5	"Burger, She Wrote"	Peter Bonerz	Molly Newman	October 17, 1994	21.9
When her life-sized statue of "Meaty Boy," an icon from a childhood burger place, is taken as a prank, Murphy unleashes a reign of terror against the suspected perpetrators.
157	6	"Humboldt IV: Judgment Day"	Peter Bonerz	Eileen Heisler & DeAnn Heline	October 24, 1994	20.4
Jim tries to get the staff to be part of the Humboldt Award judging committee. Frank just tries to get on the ballot since he forgot to send in his entry, but didn't forget his ad campaign. Murphy plans to go to a Motown festival with Peter after judging an easy category, but when she gets reassigned to another category, she makes the other judges' experiences—including Corky's—a living hell.
158	7	"Frank Cuts Loose"	Peter Bonerz	Bill Diamond	October 31, 1994	20.5
When FYI is moved out of its time slot to Saturday night, Frank goes upstairs to try to get the show moved back. Instead, he gets his big chance at being the lead anchor of the new magazine show that is taking the time slot. Then, the network asks Murphy to interview him before their first show.
159	8	"Reporters Make Strange Bedfellows"	Peter Bonerz	Eileen Heisler & DeAnn Heline	November 7, 1994	20.3
After her story falls apart, Peter & Murphy try to have a romantic weekend in the Cayman Islands. Just after arriving, Murphy gets word that the story is back on, then Peter stumbles onto a lead and then their competition begins.
160	9	"Prelude to a Kiss"	Alan Rafkin	Bill Diamond	November 14, 1994	21.4
Unbeknownst to Miles, Corky classifies a Saturday night dinner with him as a date. When he does find out, at first he isn't interested, but then changes his mind.
161	10	"Bye Bye Bernecky"	Alan Rafkin	Rob Bragin	November 21, 1994	23.0
Eldin's mother (Anne Meara) stops by to visit (she's a hit with the FYI staffers) and she has a letter for Eldin. The letter contains a chance for Eldin to study with a famous muralist in Spain, but it means he must leave Murphy and Avery, which is something he's reluctant to do, so Murphy fires him.
162	11	"The Secret Life of Jim Dial"	Alan Rafkin	Nell Scovell	November 28, 1994	21.5
A series of incidents, while Doris is away, make Jim the subject of a tabloid article and his co-workers begin to doubt the credibility of his side of the story.
163	12	"Brown in Toyland"	Alan Rafkin	Diane Burroughs & Joey Gutierrez	December 12, 1994	21.0
Murphy joins the frenzied masses of toy shoppers, when she overhears Avery tell Santa that he wants the hottest toy on the market for Christmas. This holiday season is turning into a bummer for Corky, when nothing seems to go right.
164	13	"The Best and Not-So-Brightest"	Peter Bonerz	Michael Saltzman	January 2, 1995	21.8
Stuart Best returns to Washington as a congressman and he humiliates Murphy at an inaugural party. To get her revenge, Murphy gets him on FYI to see where he stands on the issues, only to learn that Stuart didn't find out who was contributing to his campaign.
165	14	"Rumble in the Alley"	Peter Bonerz	Bill Barol	January 9, 1995	21.9
Murphy and Peter find out how much they don't know when they go out on a double date with Frank and a quick blind date that Peter finds for him. Corky and Miles's relationship begins to gel.
166	15	"Requiem For a Crew Guy"	Peter Bonerz	Eileen Heisler & DeAnn Heline	January 16, 1995	20.0
Murphy is the only one who can't remember Jack, a crew member who's just died; everyone else can, but Murphy is the one who's been asked to give the eulogy.
167	16	"I Want My MTV-Jay"	Peter Bonerz	Bill Diamond	January 23, 1995	22.2
While Lansing is in the hospital for a "heart attack," he decides to bring youth and cute animals into the CBS schedule. This includes the addition of a former MTV veejay to FYI. Murphy likes the new anchor, but her politics come out during a White House press conference.
168	17	"Specific Overtures"	Ned E. Davis	Adam Belanoff	February 6, 1995	22.0
When a network executive (Dan Castellaneta) sexually harasses Corky, Murphy deals with him and then gets slapped with a harassment suit of her own.
169	18	"A Rat's Tale"	Alan Rafkin	Rob Bragin	February 13, 1995	18.3
There is a rat running amok at FYI as they move to their new ground level studio, with a "Window on America"; when Murphy is seen catching a rat on camera, the animal rights activists react.
170	19	"It's Miller Time"	Alan Rafkin	Michael Saltzman	February 20, 1995	19.6
Miles begins to split his time with another show that features Miller Redfield, who is still interested in Corky. Murphy takes over FYI as a result. Meanwhile, Miles is too busy for a relationship with Corky.
171	20	"McGovern: Unclothed"	Alan Rafkin	DeAnn Heline & Eileen Heisler	February 27, 1995	21.5
When McGovern appears naked on the cover of Rolling Stone magazine, Murphy is certain that Lansing will get rid of her.
172	21	"The Good Nephew"	Alan Rafkin	Bill Diamond	March 13, 1995	21.4
Murphy is forced to hire Lansing's nephew as her new secretary. He proves to be the best one she's ever had, but only at the expense of the rest of the staff. Guest starring Paul Reubens as Andrew J. Lansing.
173	22	"FYI of the Hurricane"	Peter Bonerz	Rob Bragin	March 20, 1995	21.5
The staff is sent down to Florida to cover a hurricane and Murphy is showing signs of being pregnant again. Later, after the results of a test are in, Peter asks Murphy an important question.
174	23	"Model Relationships"	Peter Bonerz	Michael Saltzman	May 8, 1995	17.8
Miles begins dating Vendela, the supermodel, to make Corky jealous. Murphy relents and lets Corky help make her wedding plans, just so that pizza won't be on the menu.
175	24	"Make Room For Daddy"	Alan Rafkin	Elaine Pope & John Bowman	May 15, 1995	15.8
Murphy and Peter's busy schedules keep postponing the details for the various wedding activities. Murphy claims they are not pre-wedding jitters, but aren't they? Meanwhile, Miller confronts Corky about taking their relationship to the "next level": sex. Frank arranges Peter's bachelor party and when he doesn't make it, guess who shows up?
176	25	"Retrospective"	Eric Schotz	Bill Paolantonio & Greg Czech & Eric Schotz	May 22, 1995	16.0
177	26	"Retrospective"	Eric Schotz	Bill Paolantonio & Greg Czech & Eric Schotz	May 22, 1995	16.0
The first seven seasons of the show are highlighted by Lesley Stahl of CBS's 60 Minutes including interviews with the cast and Diane English, the series creator.

=== Season 8 (1995–96) ===
No. overall	No. in season	Title	Directed by	Written by	Original release date	U.S. viewers (millions)
178	1	"Altered States"	Peter Bonerz	Bill Diamond	September 18, 1995	25.0
With her marriage to Peter canceled, Murphy is skeptical at the sudden marriage of Miles and Corky.
179	2	"The Awful Truth"	Peter Bonerz	Michael Saltzman	September 25, 1995	19.6
Lansing's nephew becomes Vice President of Current Affairs and he lures Murphy into a new hard news show he's created featuring Walter Cronkite; however, soon Cronkite becomes Redfield and the hard news becomes infotainment.
180	3	"Fearless Frank"	Peter Bonerz	Joshua Sternin & Jennifer Ventimilia	October 2, 1995	17.4
Frank escapes death while interviewing a mass murderer. Frank would like to cover less action stories. However, Lansing, hoping for a ratings boost, wants Frank to cover even riskier stories. Frank starts doing the stunts and then Lansing wants him to jump off the building, live.
181	4	"Murphy's Law"	Peter Bonerz	Rob Bragin	October 9, 1995	18.2
Murphy's appearance in traffic court and her need to not get special treatment, because of her celebrity status, gets her a fine and 40 hours of community service. The judge demands that she reappear in court when it is reported that didn't serve her time by getting special treatment and as a result, the network hires a high-power "defense team."
182	5	"Sex or Death"	Peter Bonerz	David Sacks	October 16, 1995	18.9
Sex (consummation of his marriage to Corky) or death (from Murphy) is on the line for Miles when he gives a pivotal political story to each of them, then must take it back. He waffles and assigns the story to both of them.
183	6	"Miller's Crossing"	Joe Regalbuto	Alana Burgi & Marsha Myers	October 23, 1995	19.5
Murphy fears that she is losing her touch when she loses an important interview to Miller; however, his touch is a little different.
184	7	"The Feminine Critique"	Joe Regalbuto	Michael Saltzman	October 30, 1995	18.4
A truck crashes through the studio window, so the team accompanies Murphy back to her alma mater where she is receiving an honorary doctorate. However, the students in the women's studies program she helped establish think she is out of touch with women in the 90's.
185	8	"Bad Company"	Peter Bonerz	Joshua Sternin & Jennifer Ventimilia	November 6, 1995	17.5
Andrew comes down to Murphy with a story idea: a profile of a business mogul. She rejects the idea while Frank takes the idea but doesn't do anything with it. Andrew soon provides the dirt & Murphy and Frank do a big expose at the same time that this mogul buys the network.
186	9	"The Ten Percent Solution"	Peter Bonerz	Douglas Wyman	November 13, 1995	19.4
Murphy fires her agent, and then the rivalry begins when she signs with Jim's agent and gets everything she wants. Jim's jealousy builds and is revealed during an airing of The McLaughlin Group.
187	10	"The Humboldt Doldt"	Joe Regalbuto	Joshua Sternin & Jennifer Ventimilia	November 20, 1995	17.2
An ungrateful Miller wins the Humboldt Award for a story that the entire FYI staff worked on in a pinch for him on Front and Center. The staff soon waits anxiously for Murphy's retaliation.
188	11	"Dick and Dottie"	Peter Bonerz	Bill Diamond	November 27, 1995	18.0
Lansing wants Murphy to publicly apologize about a comment she made about a popular talk-show host. She tries, but things only get worse. Guest starring Fred Willard as Dick and Shelley Long as Dottie.
189	12	"All in the Family"	Joe Regalbuto	Bill Diamond	January 8, 1996	21.9
Corky and Miles decide to make their marriage official by having a real ceremony. The trouble begins when Nana Silverberg (Jean Stapleton) meets the Sherwoods and their differences of opinion are expressed after Corky finally tells her family about the fact they are already married.
190	13	"If You're Going to Talk the Talk"	Peter Bonerz	Sarah Dunn	January 15, 1996	17.8
Murphy is the reluctant winner of an interview with a celebrity who's never given one. Just as she gets into doing the whole "fluff" piece, a real news story breaks out. The network decides they want to continue with the "fluff", but will Murphy sacrifice her journalistic integrity?
191	14	"My Fair Miller"	Peter Bonerz	David Sacks	January 22, 1996	17.1
Lansing asks Jim to turn Miller into a real newsman. The rest of FYI is soon shocked to learn that Jim is responsible for the change in Miller. Jim, in turn, is shocked to find out that a similar thing was done for him many years ago.
192	15	"Old Flames"	Peter Bonerz	Rob Bragin	February 5, 1996	14.9
Murphy misses a social event and tries to pull an all-nighter to work on her latest story. Peter drops by unexpectedly (he's only in town for 24 hours). Murphy wants to keep working on her story; instead she falls asleep. She begins dreaming that she's on trial for all her relationship sins, and begins facing all her previous suitors in court.
193	16	"Up in Smoke"	Peter Bonerz	Michael Saltzman	February 12, 1996	16.7
Stuart Best is now a tobacco lobbyist but he has a change of heart when he decides that smoking really stinks. He gives FYI the memos, etc. that will expose the tobacco industry. He becomes a little nervous and meets with the network lawyers where a little detail reveals they could all be sued. Murphy contemplates her future in journalism, but Jim makes the move.
194	17	"Aftermath"	Peter Bonerz	Joshua Sternin & Jennifer Ventimilia	February 19, 1996	17.6
Jim's surprise resignation last week impacts the future of FYI. The staff convinces Lansing to get him back, but that doesn't work out the way they'd hoped. Lansing makes Miller their new anchor and Jim tells everyone that he is going to head the news division for the new ICN Network. Later, Murphy and Frank go there to convince him to return, but Murphy sees that in spite of the fact that everything is falling apart around him, he is truly enjoying himself.
195	18	"Trick or Retreat"	Joe Regalbuto	Sarah Dunn	February 26, 1996	21.3
Elizabeth Taylor cancels her interview with Murphy, because the police have a lead on her stolen pearls. Jim stops by for a chance to meet Miss Taylor. Meanwhile, Miles wants the team to stop torturing Miller. Miles asks Jim for a bit of advice and he suggests a retreat. So Miles takes the team north to get them to work together as a team.
196	19	"All Singing! All Dancing! All Miserable!"	Joe Regalbuto	Adolphus Spriggs	March 4, 1996	14.9
Murphy is coordinator of the Press-capades and is set on playing the role of Hillary Clinton in a sketch she's written. The rest of the cast wants her out and she concedes; however, Katie Couric has an accident before the show, so guess who gets the role. Guest starring Wolf Blitzer and Newt Gingrich.
197	20	"The Bus Stops Here"	Peter Bonerz	Marsha Myers & Alana Burgi	March 11, 1996	15.8
Miles gets to use the new T-2000 bus to cover a primary campaign stop in Madison. The bus breaks down before they get there, so they decide to do their coverage from a local diner. GOP aides and other networks discover the broadcast and descend on the diner, turning it into just another campaign story. Meanwhile, Jim and his team get to Madison and get the real story.
198	21	"When A. Lansing Loves a Woman"	Peter Bonerz	Joshua Sternin & Jennifer Ventimilia	April 29, 1996	12.3
A secret admirer fills Murphy's office with flowers, candy and other gifts. It's obvious who the admirer is: Andrew J. Lansing III. Andrew gets her to his place (under false pretenses). Frank rescues her; however, they discover the hideous truth.
199	22	"Casa Nova"	Peter Bonerz	Daphne Pollon	May 6, 1996	15.1
Frank, smitten with a real estate agent, buys a $5 million mansion that he can't afford.
200	23	"Stepping Out (Part 1)"	Peter Bonerz	Tom Seeley & Norm Gunzenhauser	May 13, 1996	15.3
Murphy celebrates her 8th year of sobriety, but she has a few steps to go. Making amends is her next step, an awfully big one but she tries really hard; everyone else is concerned about rumors of FYI moving its time slot. Murphy decides to confront Stan about the rumor. She finds out more than she wants to (and even more from Phil) then has to keep it a secret, especially from Corky and Frank. Murphy decides to quit FYI with Frank and Corky joining her.
201	24	"Miles Away (Part 2)"	Peter Bonerz	Rob Bragin & Bill Diamond & Michael Saltzman	May 20, 1996	16.0
The unemployed staff members decide it would be a slap in the face to the network if they helped Jim and his team out. Miller wants to move into Murphy's office. Miles fills Lansing in on the state of things. Lansing offers advice to Miles, which he declines. Lansing concedes, FYI is back, complete with Jim; the network is going to let them run the tobacco story. Charles Kuralt takes over Jim's responsibilities at ICN. Impressed with Miles' hardball tactics, Lansing offers him a big job in New York City and he accepts.

=== Season 9 (1996–97) ===
No. overall	No. in season	Title	Directed by	Written by	Original release date	U.S. viewers (millions)
202	1	"Executive Decision"	Peter Bonerz	Rob Bragin & Bill Diamond	September 16, 1996	21.24
Andrew moves in as the executive producer and the staff moves him out. They try to interview replacements, but Andrew keeps getting in the way. Lansing makes a decision that puts the executive producer of a game show in charge of FYI and she lays down one of the rules of her game. Lily Tomlin joins the cast as Kay Carter-Shepley.
203	2	"Power Play"	Peter Bonerz	Bob Stevens	September 23, 1996	18.93
Kay begins to wield her power. She starts with the wardrobe policy, the coffee island and holding the story meetings in her office. Murphy fights back and the rest of the staff joins her, even though they like the story assignments she's given them. Murphy stands fast as they all cave in. She confronts Kay and lets her know who's in charge; however, viewers discover who's really the master manipulator. Murphy takes Kay's story idea (moderating the Presidential debates) and finds out the rest have killed their stories. Kay offers to help them get them back as Murphy declares war.
204	3	"A Comedy of Eros"	Peter Bonerz	Joshua Sternin & Jennifer Ventimilia	September 30, 1996	17.80
Frank is getting one of his plays produced. When he gets an out-of-country assignment, he leaves Murphy in charge of looking after his interests in the production. Busy with her own story, Murphy takes a hands-off approach to the production, leaving the director to make his own decisions. The director decides on a major casting change; Murphy finds out about it, just before the curtain rises.
205	4	"Son of Dottie"	Peter Bonerz	Daphne Pollon	October 7, 1996	16.60
Dottie invites Avery to her son Harrison's birthday party, despite Murphy telling her she doesn't like her. Corky finds some interesting information on Dottie's clothing line, Murphy makes a deal and trades stories; then she dishes the dirt on Dottie. Even that doesn't initially keep Dottie away. Finally Dottie soon hates her; however, Murphy discovers that Avery still wants to go to the party. Murphy sneaks him in, but Dottie still demands an apology.
206	5	"Office Politics"	Joe Regalbuto	Bill Kunstler	October 14, 1996	14.9
Murphy begins to redecorate her bedroom into an office with a few extra amenities. Jim insists that she get a permit and have the job done properly; unfortunately, she's already started. To get a permit, she has to get permission from her neighbor, Old Man Swenson. Eventually an agreement is reached, but will Murphy endure him long enough to keep up her end of the bargain?
207	6	"Phil's Dead — Long Live Phil's"	Peter Bonerz	Tom Seeley & Norm Gunzenhauser	October 21, 1996	17.09
Phil passes away. When Phyllis announces her intention to sell, the gang decides to buy the bar. Trouble begins when each has their own idea how to improve the place. Finally they decide that they should keep one tradition.
208	7	"That's the Way the Corky Crumbles"	Joe Regalbuto	Joshua Sternin & Jennifer Ventimilia	October 28, 1996	15.5
Kay lays down an edict that the staff must stay in Washington, which puts a damper on Corky's trip to rendezvous with Miles in New York City. She also puts a stop to Murphy's expense account. In defiance, Murphy gets Corky on a plane to New York. Fortunately a breaking story in New York City works to Murphy's advantage. However, the next day, Corky "crumbles" under the feeling of guilt.
209	8	"Defending Your Life"	Peter Bonerz	Kirk Savell	November 4, 1996	13.8
Murphy is ready to anchor the election coverage. However, all her former secretaries have formed a support group. The eastern branch is led by Robert (Secretary #2) and they all try to show Murphy the error of her ways.
210	9	"Underdogs"	Peter Bonerz	Daphne Pollon	November 11, 1996	14.7
Murphy's former agent, Steve, gives her a copy of TV Q ratings. She discovers that Miller's ratings are very low and she sees an opportunity to finally get rid of him. So she hooks Miller up with her former agent and insists it would be a great time for him to renegotiate his contract using the "underdog theory". He is fired and ironically all the other networks start a bidding war for his services.
211	10	"Nobody's Perfect"	Peter Bonerz	Tom Palmer	November 18, 1996	15.2
Frank thinks that Dana may finally be the one. He asks Murphy to have lunch with her and give her approval. When she does, he hesitates, but then he moves in with her. At their first dinner party, some truths about Dana are revealed: She keeps a menagerie in her apartment, has a son, her furniture is being repossessed and her ex-husband has broken out of prison and is looking for a place to stay.
212	11	"A One Night Stan"	Joe Regalbuto	Tom Seeley & Norm Gunzenhauser	November 25, 1996	15.1
In an attempt to divert Kay's attention from FYI, Murphy suggests that Kay produce a new afternoon talk show that she also convinces Stan that he can host. Frank even gets to play the saxophone in the house band. The premiere show starts out really badly and guest Tom Hanks escapes. As a result, Murphy becomes the replacement guest.
213	12	"Separation Anxiety"	Joe Regalbuto	Bill Kunstler	December 2, 1996	14.7
Everyone tries to come up with an excuse to miss Jim and Doris's annual party. This year's festivities are anything but boring when their fight turns into a separation.
214	13	"Montezuma's Retreat"	Peter Bonerz	Joshua Sternin & Jennifer Ventimilia	December 16, 1996	13.5
Murphy suspects that Kay has ulterior motives when Kay says the network is sending the staff to a retreat in Mexico. Instead, while there, she must contend with filling all her free time avoiding a group of employees from a corporation that she exposed for their corrupt practices. Corky faces being without Miles, yet again. Jim discovers a "short"-age when he packs his own suitcase for the first time. Frank, fearing the worst when Kay wants to talk with him, gets the courage to confront her.
215	14	"The Big Thaw"	Peter Bonerz	Rob Bragin & Bill Diamond	January 6, 1997	14.96
When Kay and Murphy are the only ones to make it into the office during a snowstorm, Kay seizes the opportunity to get an evaluation of her performance. Instead, she gets Murphy giving her several examples of how she acted in a variety of situations.
216	15	"Who Do You Truss?"	Peter Bonerz	Bill Kunstler	January 13, 1997	16.47
Jim is going to the hospital for a hernia operation. Frank and Murphy both fight to do the commentary during his absence. Kay leaves the decision up to them. They decide to ask Jim, despite Jim's just regaining consciousness from his operation. Corky gets a protégé, who is a lot like she was years ago; it slowly drives her nuts.
217	16	"You Don't Know Jackal"	Joe Regalbuto	Daphne Pollon	January 20, 1997	14.52
When Kay isn't sure about the accuracy of Murphy's source, she wants to meet him. To keep her source's anonymity, Murphy and Frank decide to hire an impostor. Unfortunately they both hire someone for the part. The guy Frank hires, a video store clerk, seizes the opportunity to be on television when he tells Kay he'll appear to be on the show.
218	17	"Blind Date"	Joe Regalbuto	Joshua Sternin & Jennifer Ventimilia	February 3, 1997	14.28
Lansing is being honored at a dinner. Murphy arranges a blind date for Jim, but she mistakenly ends up with Miller. Meanwhile, despite the fact that he is in a committed relationship, Frank suddenly contends with being popular with the ladies.
219	18	"Oh, Danny Boy"	Peter Bonerz	Tom Palmer	February 10, 1997	14.96
Corky complains about the local dry cleaner; she plans to take action. Frank complains about Dana's delinquent son. Murphy suggests that he gets a job. Frank asks Kay and he suddenly becomes a valuable asset to the organization, as a strong arm man. Murphy, stuck keeping an eye on Danny, has to take him with her to Atlantic City. While there, gambling fever takes them over.
220	19	"Desperate Times"	Peter Bonerz	Joshua Sternin & Jennifer Ventimilia	February 17, 1997	12.26
To combat against some radical changes that Kay is proposing, Murphy enlists the aid of Andrew J. Lansing III, who has been recuperating in a Buddhist monastery.
221	20	"And That's the Way it Was?"	Peter Bonerz	Tom Seeley & Norm Gunzenhauser	February 24, 1997	12.61
Frank announces that he's taken the plunge; he bought a new Jaguar XK8. Corky comes in with a story about Walter Cronkite. Only she can't tell them what he said. However, she does but can't elaborate on the grunt he made about Murphy. Not knowing what he thinks begins to affect her performance. Frank tries to help out with help from Tom Snyder and Phil Jr. In the end, Murphy goes to confront Walter.
222	21	"How to Marry a Billionaire"	Peter Bonerz	Adam Balsam & Joshua Krawitz	April 28, 1997	12.77
A billionaire media mogul proposes marriage to Murphy while she is conducting an on-air interview with him. Murphy doubts the sincerity of the proposal, then the gift of an 8+ carat diamond ring arrives. She declines the invitation, but that doesn't keep Briggs from trying, via using Frank and the other FYI staffers. He even buys her contract from Lansing, then Kay steps in.
223	22	"Hero Today, Gone Tomorrow"	Peter Bonerz	Ron Fassler	May 5, 1997	10.17
Murphy and Frank sneak off work to go to an exhibit honoring broadcast journalism and run into Stuart Best, now working as a security guard. When Kay confronts them the next day, the news that Stuart rescued several artifacts from a fire at the museum leads the gang at FYI to believe that he started the fire himself. Guest starring Adam West.
224	23	"Mama Miller"	Steve Zuckerman	Bill Diamond & Rob Bragin	May 12, 1997	11.29
Miller's overbearing mother (Rue McClanahan) is going to write him off as her son since he is an idiot and not married yet. To impress her, Miller claims that he and Murphy are friends. Because Murphy is uncomfortable around Miller, his mother suspects they might be more than friends—something he doesn't readily deny.
225	24	"When One Door Closes..."	Joe Regalbuto	Bob Stevens	May 19, 1997	12.55
Murphy makes a candid comment about the President during the end credits for FYI that goes out on the air. When Murphy refuses to apologize, Lansing fires Kay. The next day, Murphy receives a phone call and is summoned to appear at the White House, where she sits and waits. Murphy returns from her audience with the President; she has a big decision to make regarding her future.

=== Season 10 (1997–98) ===
No. overall	No. in season	Title	Directed by	Written by	Original release date	U.S. viewers (millions)
226	1	"Murphy Redux"	Peter Bonerz	Marc Flanagan	October 1, 1997	12.07
Murphy says her goodbyes to the gang of FYI. She takes a month off before her new job at the White House starts. On her first day, Murphy enters the gate of the White House and forty minutes later she makes her exit. She goes back to FYI looking for her old job; though Joan Lunden is a prime candidate. When she does return, her first show back features a report by Corky on breast cancer. Appalled by the fact that neither Murphy nor Kay has had a recent mammogram, Corky insists they each get one. Kay's test is negative, but Murphy has to speak to the doctor.
227	2	"A Butcher, A Faker a Bummed-Out Promo Maker"	Peter Bonerz	Mike Chessler & Chris Alberghini	October 8, 1997	12.82
Murphy needs a biopsy, which she reluctantly gets right away and must wait to hear the results at the end of the next day. In the morning of the next day, the staff fights the network lawyers who want to kill their grocery chain story. As a compromise with the network, they can do their story if they have a legal consultant with them in the remote unit and Jim must do promos for all the local affiliates. When their undercover operative isn't going to work out and Frank is convinced he is too well known to pull it off, Kay volunteers. Meanwhile, Jim makes his promos. Just before going to dinner that evening, Murphy gets the results of her test and tells Frank the news.
228	3	"Ectomy, Schmectomy"	Peter Bonerz	Janis Hirsch	October 15, 1997	11.35
When Murphy and Frank don't show up for dinner, Kay speculates they are having a relationship. Murphy drops the bomb on the rest of the staff. Jim is speechless. Frank tries to help in every way that he can. Murphy faces a tough decision with the myriad of treatment options for her breast cancer. Guest starring Rita Moreno.
229	4	"Operation: Murphy Brown"	Joe Regalbuto	Norm Gunzenhauser & Tom Seeley	October 22, 1997	10.33
Murphy worries about how she is going to tell Avery about the trip to the hospital she is making to treat a word she can't yet bring herself to say. The gang plans to help Murphy keep the nature of her surgery from an annoying member of the paparazzi. Kay (disguised as Murphy), Jim and Corky try to keep the photographer diverted while Murphy is prepared for the procedure, but are the doctors prepared for her? Despite the efforts, the photographer gets photos and the real information about Murphy's visit, but fortunately, Frank deals with that issue. Meanwhile in recovery, Murphy meets a woman whose words help her to say the word "cancer."
230	5	"Florence Night-en Corky"	Joe Regalbuto	Jhoni Marchinko	October 29, 1997	10.54
Frank can't stop telling the story about him punching the paparazzi. Murphy returns to work the day after her surgery and she looks like hell and is very disoriented. Corky takes her home and offers to stay with her for a couple of days. Murphy becomes so dependent upon Corky that she hasn't got the time to take care of her own problems, such as her failing marriage to Miles.
231	6	"Waiting to Inhale"	Steve Zuckerman	Tom Seeley & Norm Gunzenhauser	November 5, 1997	12.54
Murphy begins her chemotherapy treatments. The treatments make her uncomfortable and take a lot out of her. She confronts Jim about his avoidance of her and her condition. In an effort to help her out, Jim purchases some marijuana to help ease her pain. They light up and deal with their issues.
232	7	"Petty Woman"	Joe Regalbuto	Bill Masters	November 12, 1997	10.66
Murphy's archrival, Athena Gillington (Joanna Gleason), invites her to one of her parties. Murphy doesn't want to go because she thinks it is a pity invitation. Murphy relents and attends the party where she discovers two things about Athena: that she is using Murphy's presence at the party as publicity for her "I Just Turned 50" book, and that Athena is much older than 50.
233	8	"From Here to Jerusalem"	Joe Regalbuto	Hayes Jackson	November 19, 1997	9.71
While acting as chaperone for one of Avery's field trips, Murphy meets a younger man who wants to take her out on a date. The staff worry about nominations for the upcoming Humboldt Awards; no one is nominated, except Murphy who is to receive the Lifetime Achievement Award. She is honored, but concerned that her illness might be the reason for receiving the honor at this point in her career. Murphy decides to accept the young man's offer and begins to enjoy herself. The gang is reluctant to accept him, and even Murphy feels she would be embarrassed to be seen with him when she plans to take him to the Humboldt Awards.
234	9	"Tempus Fugit"	Steve Zuckerman	Marc Flanagan & Bill Masters	November 24, 1997	11.50
Frank signs his new contract; Murphy is in the midst of negotiating her new deal. After Murphy can't make her appearance on the show, Corky fills in and does a great job conducting the scheduled interview. The network brass wants to give Corky the chance to report from the Middle East. The network only offers Murphy a one year deal instead of the usual three year deal, and Murphy won't back down until the network meets her on her terms.
235	10	"I Hear a Symphony"	Steve Zuckerman	Janis Hirsch	December 10, 1997	10.51
Corky is working to help the zoo with their charity auction. Murphy's bout with cancer has made her realize there may not another chance to do some of the things she'd like to do. When the one item goes up for bid that she is interested in, it's Murphy Brown vs. Olivia Newton-John for the right to conduct a symphony orchestra. Meanwhile, Doris tells Jim that it is time to file the divorce papers; Murphy encourages him to fight for her.
236	11	"From the Terrace"	Peter Bonerz	Jhoni Marchinko	December 17, 1997	9.68
Murphy fires yet another secretary (Julie Brown) and while searching for a story idea for Corky, Kay suggests the staff go out on the terrace. They get trapped out there when the door closes and no one has a key. Jim has a dinner date scheduled with Doris, Corky is going to miss the lighting of the White House tree, and Frank has a flight to Costa Rica. They have a chance to get back inside when Murphy's recently-fired secretary returns to the office, only for the ex-secretary it's revenge time. Kay feels they've been locked out on the terrace for some greater purpose, while Murphy has her doubts. Meanwhile, in a building across the way, a man and a woman fight about the time they're not spending on their relationship, only to be inspired by a group of people on a balcony.
237	12	"The Last Temptation of Murphy"	Steve Zuckerman	Hayes Jackson	January 7, 1998	9.66
Murphy's new secretary (Laura Kightlinger) makes a great cup of coffee, but doesn't have time for much else. Murphy receives a call from a former Wall Street trader who has just been released from his prison sentence for insider trading and he wants to be interviewed on the show. During the on camera interview, he proposes to use some of his money to hold a benefit run for breast cancer research, which he would like Murphy endorse. Later, off-camera, she does and really thinks that he might have changed when everything seems to go right with the event--until he tells her that he doubled the $1 million they rose. She also discovers that public opinion is split, not on what she did, but who she did it with.
238	13	"Turpis Capillus Annus"	Steve Zuckerman	Marilyn Suzanne Miller	January 14, 1998	9.01
The chemotherapy begins to take its toll on Murphy's hair. She begins to wear a wig and attends support group meetings. Guest starring Marcia Wallace and Wendie Jo Sperber.
239	14	"Wee Small Hours"	Steve Zuckerman	Story by : Bill Masters; Teleplay by : Norm Gunzenhauser & Jhoni Marchinko	January 21, 1998	9.39
Murphy battles insomnia and the gang helps her to get through the night. Frank, while he is on a stakeout with a SWAT team. Jim, while he is working on getting back together with Doris. Corky, while she is going through her storage locker of memories. Kay, who was up anyway, helps Murphy make and bake cookies from scratch, over the phone.
240	15	"Then and Now"	Peter Bonerz	Adam Belanoff	January 28, 1998	7.65
Kay's idea to take the show to Paris turns into the network's idea of airing old stories on a cable special. The staff tries to decide upon which of their old stories to show. Murphy sees herself side-by-side, then and now, and that causes her to return to her childhood home in Philadelphia in an attempt to recapture something from her childhood.
241	16	"Opus One"	Steve Zuckerman	Marc Flanagan & Janis Hirsch	April 6, 1998	9.69
Murphy is done with her chemotherapy and she thinks that is the best birthday present she could get for her upcoming 50th birthday. Frank and Murphy decide that it might be interesting to try going out on a date together. But Frank has to cut the date short, because he has a big surprise planned for Murphy's birthday: he has managed to have the American Bandstand recreated in the FYI studio, complete with Dick Clark and a variety of featured artists. Guest starring Sally Field, Chubby Checker, Lesley Gore, and Fabian.
242	17	"Seems Like Gold Times"	Joe Regalbuto	Story by : Russ Woody & Daphne Pollon; Teleplay by : Russ Woody	April 13, 1998	7.79
Jerry Gold returns from Germany and it seems just like old times for Murphy and Jerry and the gang. Even Kay sees it as she tells the gang how she thinks they are perfect for each other. Murphy and Jerry take the day off from work and feel the old sparks again. He inquires on her health. Jerry and Murphy end up in bed together. Murphy tells him she does not want a relationship. Jerry says likewise, because he's getting married. After Murphy tries to kick Jerry out of her house, he tells her he wants her to be his best man because he cares so much about her. Murphy agrees with much begrudging. Murphy pretends she's not hurt, but Kay can see it. She even goes so far as to say Jerry is in town so she will stop the wedding. At the wedding, Jerry and Murphy fight over why he's in town. Jerry thinks she doesn't want him to get married. They each blame each other. Jerry gets cold feet and admits he still cares for Murphy, and does not want to lose what they have, which will happen when he gets married. Murphy convinces him that if he really loves this woman, he has to do this. They say they love each other and Jerry gets married.
243	18	"Second Time Around"	Joe Regalbuto	Janis Hirsch	April 20, 1998	8.70
For a birthday present, Murphy helps her cancer support group friend Lisa to meet her high school crush. The gang decides to return the same favor for Murphy when Murphy mentions the name of boy she had a crush on; he was the lead in a high school production of "The Music Man." They set up a surprise meeting and they discover that Murphy's old crush is now a lounge singer. Guest starring Michael McKean.
244	19	"A Man and a Woman"	Steve Zuckerman	Jhoni Marchinko	April 27, 1998	8.43
To prove her point about gender identification, Kay shows up at Phil's dressed as a man. The disguise fools the staff and Murphy uses Kay in her disguise to stop the advances of an IRS tax accountant that has information Murphy needs for a big story. Unfortunately, the ploy jeopardizes Murphy's chances at the story. The staff tries to help Murphy rescue her story. Guest starring Rosie O'Donnell.
245	20	"Dial and Substance"	Steve Zuckerman	Tom Seeley & Norm Gunzenhauser	May 4, 1998	7.32
Murphy finds a secretary that she likes Don Rickles; only nobody else likes his abrasive approach. Jim is planning a rendezvous with Doris in Maine. When he tries to go through the metal detector at the airport he is found to be in possession of a small quantity of marijuana, which happens to be the marijuana that he purchased to help Murphy get through her chemotherapy. He dismisses it all as a minor inconvenience until the press gets hold of the story. In the ensuing media frenzy, while Jim prefers to remain silent, Murphy thinks it would be better to tell the truth and when she does, Jim stops talking to her.
246	21	"Never Can Say Goodbye"	Steve Zuckerman Barnet Kellman	Diane English	May 18, 1998	17.45
247	22	"Never Can Say Goodbye"	Steve Zuckerman Barnet Kellman	Diane English	May 18, 1998	17.45
Part 1: Murphy fires her last secretary (Bette Midler) and plans on leaving FYI. It has been six months since her last chemotherapy treatment. She wants to live the rest of her life. Jim mentions it might be time for him to go as well. The rest of the staff tries to come to grips with the situation. Meanwhile, shooting on location down the street, Julia Roberts stops by the offices of FYI hoping to meet Frank. To be free and clear of cancer, Murphy needs to get another mammogram. Unfortunately, the mammogram shows something that will require exploratory surgery to uncover its nature. Seeking comfort, Murphy reflects on the need to talk with Phil and no one is more surprised than she is when he returns from the dead. Seems he knew too much about Whitewater. Murphy goes under the knife as the gang waits outside. Murphy has an out-of-body experience that brings her up to heaven to conduct the only person she hasn't interviewed, God. Part 2: Jim seeks some career advice from Mike Wallace. Mike tells him he is boring and has lost his spark. Murphy begins her interview with God (Alan King), who tells her she must make the best of the gifts she has been given. The surgery reveals that the abnormality was just a cyst, so Murphy can go on with her life. The gang is happy for her, but is unsure what to do with themselves without Murphy as a part of FYI -- and they all decide it's time to move on. Frank and Julia finally get together and arrange a date. Jim prepares to leave and Murphy returns to the office. She is ready to tell everyone that she's changed her mind, when they all mention what they have in the works for their careers. Murphy confesses she doesn't want to leave, and everyone decides to continue with FYI after all. After a group hug, they all get together to reminisce on memories of the past. At the end of the day, Murphy returns to her townhouse -- where Eldin makes an entrance back into her life. Seems Avery used his mother's Sprint card to track Eldin down. (This serves as a reference to real life, as Candice Bergen was featured prominently in Sprint's ad campaign of the era.) Eldin proposes marriage to Murphy, but instead she offers him the opportunity to give the place a touchup.

=== Season 11 (2018) ===
No. overall	No. in season	Title	Directed by	Written by	Original release date	Prod. code	U.S. viewers (millions)
248	1	"Fake News"	Pamela Fryman	Diane English	September 27, 2018	T36.10001	7.50
249	2	"I (Don't) Heart Huckabee"	Pamela Fryman	Tom Palmer	October 4, 2018	T36.10002	7.12
250	3	"#MurphyToo"	Don Scardino	Gina Ippolito & Skander Halim	October 11, 2018	T36.10004	6.76
251	4	"Three Shirts to the Wind"	Don Scardino	Laura Krafft	October 18, 2018	T36.10003	6.39
252	5	"The Girl Who Cried About Wolf"	Don Scardino	Norm Gunzenhauser	October 25, 2018	T36.10005	6.05
253	6	"Results May Vary"	Don Scardino	Gary Dontzig & Steven Peterman	November 1, 2018	T36.10006	5.94
254	7	"A Lifetime of Achievement"	Michael Lembeck	Tom Seeley	November 8, 2018	T36.10007	6.01
255	8	"The Coma and the Oxford Comma"	Michael Lembeck	Marc Flanagan	November 15, 2018	T36.10008	5.96
256	9	"Thanksgiving and Taking"	Michael Lembeck	Russ Woody	November 22, 2018	T36.10009	4.75
257	10	"Beat the Press"	Pamela Fryman	Tom Palmer	November 29, 2018	T36.10010	5.59
258	11	"The Wheels on the Dog Go Round and Round"	Pamela Fryman	Laura Krafft	December 6, 2018	T36.10011	5.97
259	12	"AWOL"	Joe Regalbuto	Gary Dontzig & Steven Peterman	December 13, 2018	T36.10012	5.55
260	13	"Happy New Year"	Barnet Kellman	Story by : Tom Seeley & Norm Gunzenhauser; Teleplay by : Gina Ippolito & Skander Halim	December 20, 2018	T36.10013	5.21
