= John Christopher Jones (actor) =

American actor (1948–2025)

- Born: March 27, 1948; Greenfield, Massachusetts, U.S.
- Died: September 15, 2025 (aged 77); New York City, U.S.
- Education: Amherst College
- Occupation: Actor
- Years active: 1975–2024
- Spouse: Mary Beth Coudal (m. 1995)

John Christopher Jones (March 27, 1948 – September 15, 2025) was an American film, stage and television actor.

== Early life and career ==
Jones was born in Greenfield, Massachusetts, on March 27, 1948. He attended Amherst College, earning his bachelor's degree in English literature in 1971. After earning his degree, he attended the London Academy of Music and Dramatic Arts. He began his stage career in 1975, appearing in the stage play Little Black Sheep. He appeared in other plays such as The Miser, Beauty and the Beast, The Adventures of Tom Sawyer, Heartbreak House, Absurd Person Singular and The Day Room, for which he was nominated for a Drama Desk Award for Outstanding Ensemble Acting.

Later in his career, in 1977, Jones made his television debut, starring as Eddie Barnes in the CBS sitcom television series On Our Own, starring along with Lynnie Greene, Bess Armstrong and Dixie Carter. After the series ended in 1978, he starred as projectionist Marlon Bond in the CBS sitcom television series The Popcorn Kid, starring along with Bruce Norris, Raye Birk, Jeffrey Joseph, Penelope Ann Miller and Faith Ford. He guest-starred in television programs including The Sopranos (episode "From Where to Eternity"), Ed, As the World Turns, Dellaventura and Spenser: For Hire. He also appeared in films such as Desperate Hours, In & Out, Awakenings and Moonstruck.

Jones retired from acting in 2024, last appearing in the Paramount+ supernatural drama television series Evil.

== Personal life and death ==
In 1995, Jones married Mary Beth Coudal, a teacher and writer. Their marriage lasted until Jones's death in 2025.

In 2003, Jones was diagnosed with Parkinson's disease. He died from complications of the disease in New York City on September 15, 2025, at the age of 77.
