= Hope Fairfield-Shanowski =

- Hope & Faith character
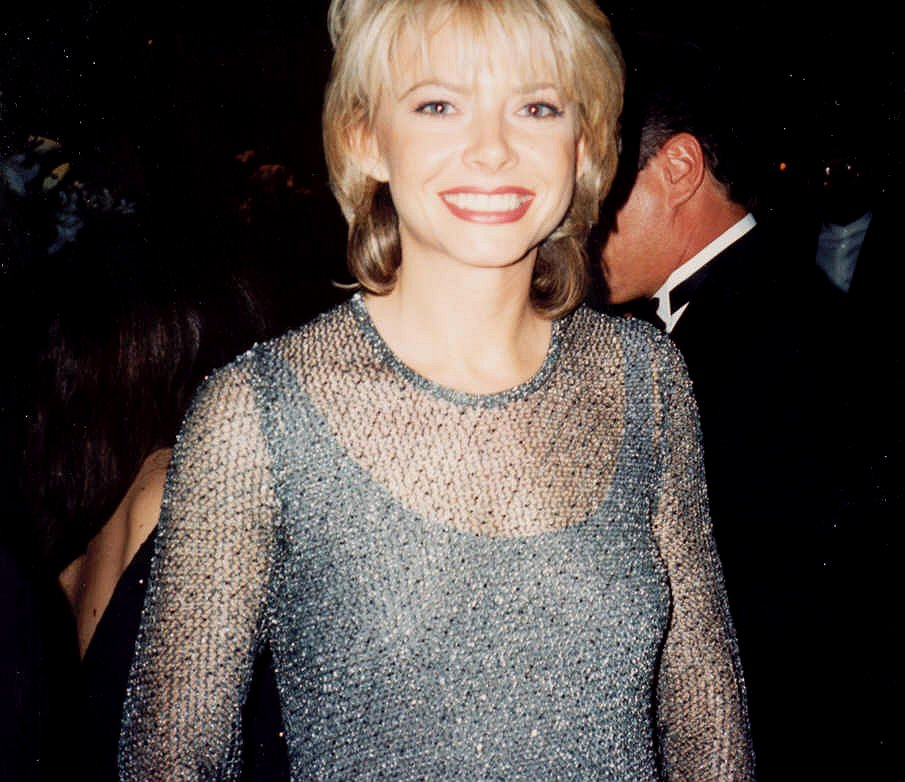
- Actress, Faith Ford acts as Hope Fairfield-Shanowski.
- First appearance: "The Pilot" )
- Last appearance: "Hope's Float"
- Created by: Joanna Johnson
- Portrayed by: Faith Ford

In-universe information
- Alias: Hope Fairfield
- Occupation: Housewife waitress
- Family: 'Jack Fairfield (father); Mary Jo Johnson Fairfield (mother, deceased); Sydney Shanowski (daughter); Hayley Shanowski (daughter); Justin Shanowski (son); Faith Fairfield(sister)
- Spouse: Charlie Shanowski
- Relatives: Dodi (first cousin once removed)

Hope Fairfield-Shanowski is a fictional character on the ABC sitcom Hope & Faith.

== Overview ==
Born as Hope Fairfield, to Jack Fairfield and Mary Fairfield . She lost her virginity to Randy Richter, somebody she used to date. She regrets it and wishes she had lost it instead to Charley Shanowski, Her husband. Hope is the matriarch of the family. She is usually the most sensible one, and is always reluctant to go along with her sister, Faith's schemes. She is married to Charlie and has 3 kids, Sydney, Hayley, and Justin. She likes to bake and garden. Faith Fairfield is Hope's sister and a soap opera star whose character was killed off, leading her to move in with Hope's family. In the middle of season 2 Hope starts a catering business with Faith and calls her business, 'Hope and Faith caterers'. But in one episode she makes it 'Hope and Grace caterers' because Faith took a job as a weather forecaster.
