= The Popcorn Kid =

- Genre: Sitcom
- Created by: Barry Kemp; Mark Ganzel
- Starring: Bruce Norris; Raye Birk; Jeffrey Joseph; Penelope Ann Miller; John Christopher Jones; Faith Ford
- Theme music composer: Gary Portnoy; Judy Hart Angelo
- Composer: Tim Truman
- Country of origin: United States
- Original language: English
- No. of seasons: 1
- No. of episodes: 6

Production
- Camera setup: Multi-camera
- Running time: 30 minutes
- Production company: MTM Enterprises

Original release
- Network: CBS
- Release: March 23 – April 24, 1987

The Popcorn Kid is an American sitcom that aired on CBS from March 23, 1987, to April 24, 1987.

== Premise ==
A 16-year-old working behind the candy counter of a movie theater in Kansas City dreams of someday being in show business.

== Cast ==
- Bruce Norris as Scott Creasman
- Raye Birk as Leonard Brown
- Jeffrey Joseph as Willie Dawson
- Penelope Ann Miller as Gwen Stottlemeyer
- John Christopher Jones as Marlin Bond
- Faith Ford as Lynn Holly Brickhouse

== Episodes ==
No.	Title	Directed by	Written by	Original release date	Prod. code
1	"Pilot"	Will Mackenzie	Mark Ganzel & Barry Kemp	March 23, 1987	1334
Scott starts a campaign to prevent the renovation of the Majestic Theater.
2	"There She Is, Vic Damone"	David Steinberg	Irene Mecchi	March 27, 1987	6503
Lynn Holly gets help from Scott to prepare for the Dream Queen Pageant.
3	"Career Day"	Will Mackenzie	Mark Ganzel & Barry Kemp	April 3, 1987	6501
Scott's father wants him to attend career day and give up his dreams of show business.
4	"The Break-Up"	Will Mackenzie	Mark Ganzel & Barry Kemp	April 10, 1987	6505
Lynn Holly dumps her Marine boyfriend to be with Scott.
5	"A Day in the Life of Ed Asner"	James Gardner	Mark Egan & Mark Solomon	April 17, 1987	6504
Marlin arranges an Edward Asner film festival, which is threatened by a tornado. Edward Asner guest stars as himself.
6	"A Car, a House, a Mouse and a Louse"	David Steinberg	Mark Ganzel & Barry Kemp	April 24, 1987	6506
The movie theater is held up by a mugger.
