= Suddenly Susan =

American television sitcom (1996–2000)

- Genre: Sitcom
- Created by: Clyde Phillips
- Developed by: Steven Peterman; Gary Dontzig
- Starring: Brooke Shields; Nestor Carbonell; Kathy Griffin; Judd Nelson; David Strickland; Barbara Barrie; Andréa Bendewald; Currie Graham; Eric Idle; Sherri Shepherd; Rob Estes
- Opening theme: "Ode to Joy" (cover version), composed by Ed Alton; (season 1); "Nothing on Me", performed by Shawn Colvin; (seasons 2–3); "Everybody Wants A Girl Like Susan", composed by Ed Alton; (season 4)
- Composer: Ed Alton
- Country of origin: United States
- Original language: English
- No. of seasons: 4
- No. of episodes: 93 (1 unaired)

Production
- Executive producers: Gary Dontzig; Steven Peterman; (both; seasons 1–3); Christopher Vane; (mid-late season 3); Maria Semple; (mid-season 3 – season 4); Brooke Shields (season 3-4); Mark Driscoll; (season 4)
- Camera setup: Videotape; multi-camera
- Running time: 23 minutes
- Production company: Warner Bros. Television

Original release
- Network: NBC
- Release: September 19, 1996 – December 26, 2000

Suddenly Susan is an American television sitcom that aired on NBC from September 19, 1996, to December 26, 2000. The series was created by Clyde Phillips and starred Brooke Shields in her first regular series. Shields played Susan Keane, a glamorous San Francisco magazine writer who begins to adjust to being single, and who learns to be independent minded after having been taken care of all her life. The series was developed by Gary Dontzig and Steven Peterman, who also served as executive producers during the first three seasons and was produced by Warner Bros. Television.

== Synopsis ==
Susan Keane (Brooke Shields) has always been taken care of by someone else. She worked as a copy editor at The Gate, a fictional San Francisco magazine. On her wedding day, she realizes that she and her wealthy, vain fiancé, Kip, are not meant for each other and that there is more to life than just being known as the "s" in "The Kip Richmonds." She abruptly leaves him at the altar. Now, she's suddenly just Susan. Susan's parents (guest stars Swoosie Kurtz and Ray Baker) were less than ecstatic about their daughter deciding to end her engagement to Kip, though her grandmother and confidant, Nana (Barbara Barrie), stands as a pillar of support for Susan.

The day after the wedding, Susan goes to her boss, Jack Richmond (Judd Nelson), the rebellious brother of Susan's former fiancé, Kip, begging for her job back. Instead, Jack assigns Susan to write a regular column about being suddenly single. Susan's coworkers include photographer Luis Rivera (Néstor Carbonell), boyish rock music reporter Todd Stites (David Strickland), restaurant critic Vicki Groener (Kathy Griffin), and, in later episodes, investigative reporter and Susan's old enemy Maddy Piper (Andréa Bendewald).

In the show's final season, The Gate is taken over by Ian Maxtone-Graham (Eric Idle) and overhauled into a men's magazine that is run out of an old warehouse in Chinatown. Along with this, Ian brings his own team of workers, including executive assistant and U.S. Navy veteran Miranda Charles (Sherri Shepherd), sportswriter Nate Knaborski (Currie Graham), and freelancer photographer Oliver Browne (Rob Estes). Susan is faced with a new set of problems and has to prove herself all over again.

Besides the task of putting together a magazine and focusing on the lead character's life, Suddenly Susan also focuses on the private lives of many employees in the show.

== Cast ==
- Brooke Shields as Susan Keane
- Néstor Carbonell as Luis Rivera, Susan's co-worker and Gate photographer
- Kathy Griffin as Vicki Groener, Susan's co-worker and Gate food/nightlife writer
- Judd Nelson as Jack Richmond, Susan's boss and original love interest (Seasons 1–3)
- David Strickland as Todd Stites, Susan's co-worker and Gate music critic (Seasons 1–3) (Note: The character portrayed by Strickland shares his name with a television producer who served as an associate producer on Murphy Brown from its sixth through tenth seasons (1994–98); Suddenly Susan developers Gary Dontzig and Steven Peterman wrote for the CBS sitcom for seven of its 11 total seasons (1988–93, 2018).)
- Barbara Barrie as Helen 'Nana' Keane, Susan's paternal grandmother
- Andréa Bendewald as Maddy Piper, Susan's co-worker and former high school rival, and Gate journalist (Seasons 2–3; guest star, Season 4) (Note: Bendewald was credited as a recurring guest star for the first five episodes of Season 2.)
- Currie Graham as Nate Knaborski, Susan's co-worker and Gate sportswriter (Season 4)
- Eric Idle as Ian Maxtone-Graham, Susan's boss (Season 4) (Note: The character portrayed by Idle is not connected, outside of sharing the same name, with the television writer of the same name.)
- Sherri Shepherd as Miranda Charles, Ian's executive assistant (Season 4) (Note: Prior to becoming a series regular, Shepherd guest starred as "Roni" in the Season 2 episode "It's a Mad, Mad, Mad, Maddy World".)
- Rob Estes as Oliver Browne, Susan's love interest and Gate freelance photographer (Season 4) (Note: Although Estes appeared in all but two episodes of Season 4 and was included in two of the three versions of that season's opening title sequence, he was credited as a "special guest star".)

== Episodes ==
=== Series overview ===
Season	Episodes	Originally released	
Season	Episodes	First released	Last released
1	22	September 19, 1996	May 8, 1997
2	26	September 22, 1997	May 18, 1998
3	23	September 21, 1998	May 24, 1999
4	22	September 20, 1999	December 26, 2000

=== Season 1 (1996–97) ===
No. overall	No. in season	Title	Directed by	Written by	Original release date	Prod. code	Viewers (millions)
1	1	"First Episode"	Andy Ackerman	Story by : Clyde Phillips; Teleplay by : Gary Dontzig & Steven Peterman & Billy Van Zandt & Jane Milmore & Clyde Phillips	September 19, 1996	465751	30.12
2	2	"Dr. No"	Steve Zuckerman	Dan O'Shannon	September 26, 1996	465752	28.49
3	3	"The Best Laid Plans"	Shelley Jensen	Mimi Friedman & Jeanette Collins	October 3, 1996	465754	25.07
4	4	"Suddenly Susan Unplugged"	Steve Zuckerman	Rick Singer & Andrew Green	October 10, 1996	465753	26.61
5	5	"Hoop Dreams"	Shelley Jensen	Heather MacGillvray & Linda Mathious	October 17, 1996	465755	24.35
6	6	"Lie! Lie! My Darling"	Shelley Jensen	Ian Praiser	October 31, 1996	465756	23.68
7	7	"Golden Girl Friday"	Shelley Jensen	Rick Singer & Andrew Green	November 7, 1996	465758	28.05
8	8	"Beauty and the Beasty Boy"	Steve Zuckerman	Maryanne Melloan	November 14, 1996	465757	28.08
9	9	"Cold Turkey"	Rod Daniel	Story by : Gary Dontzig & Steven Peterman; Teleplay by : Dan O'Shannon	November 21, 1996	465760	28.15
10	10	"Was It Something I Said?"	Steve Zuckerman	Marc Flanagan	December 12, 1996	465759	24.51
11	11	"The Walk-Out"	Barnet Kellman	Heather MacGillvray & Linda Mathious	December 19, 1996	465762	25.30
12	12	"The Me Nobody Nose"	Shelley Jensen	Mimi Friedman & Jeanette Collins	January 9, 1997	465764	28.61
13	13	"The Ways and Means"	Gail Mancuso	Jana Barto	February 27, 1997	465770	21.66
14	14	"What a Card"	Shelley Jensen	Rick Singer & Andrew Green	March 6, 1997	465765	24.18
15	15	"Love and Divorce American Style: Part 1"	Shelley Jensen	Ian Praiser	March 13, 1997	465767	25.62
16	16	"Love and Divorce American Style: Part 2"	Pamela Fryman	Dan O'Shannon	March 20, 1997	465768	22.80
17	17	"Love and Divorce American Style: Part 3"	Pamela Fryman	Susan Fales	March 27, 1997	465769	22.45
18	18	"With Friends Like These"	Shelley Jensen	Maryanne Melloan	April 10, 1997	465763	22.84
19	19	"Where the Wild Things Aren't"	Shelley Jensen	Maryanne Melloan	April 17, 1997	465761	21.47
20	20	"A Boy Like That"	Shelley Jensen	Gary Dontzig & Steven Peterman	April 24, 1997	465766	21.68
21	21	"Family Affairs"	Gail Mancuso	Phil Baker & Drew Vaupen	May 1, 1997	465771	21.87
22	22	"I'll See That and Raise You Susan"	Shelley Jensen	Neil J. Deiter	May 8, 1997	465772	21.44

=== Season 2 (1997–98) ===
No. overall	No. in season	Title	Directed by	Written by	Original release date	Prod. code	Viewers (millions)
23	1	"I Love You, I Think"	Tom Moore	Steven Peterman & Gary Dontzig	September 22, 1997	466301	13.02
24	2	"Past Tense"	Tom Moore	Mimi Friedman & Jeanette Collins	September 29, 1997	466302	11.51
25	3	"Truth and Consequences"	Pamela Fryman	Christopher Vane	October 6, 1997	466304	12.20
26	4	"Next Stop, Heaven"	Shelley Jensen	Becky Hartman Edwards	October 13, 1997	466303	12.76
27	5	"Susan's Minor Complication"	Shelley Jensen	Chuck Tatham	October 20, 1997	466306	11.67
28	6	"It's a Mad, Mad, Mad, Maddy World"	Shelley Jensen	Phil Baker & Drew Vaupen	November 3, 1997	466307	10.52
29	7	"It's My Nana and I'll Cry If I Want To"	Pamela Fryman	Chuck Tatham	November 10, 1997	466308	11.63
30	8	"A Kiss Before Dying...on Stage"	Tom Moore	Drew Vaupen & Phil Baker	November 17, 1997	466305	11.71
31	9	"The Old and the Beautiful"	Philip Charles MacKenzie	Rick Singer & Andrew Green	November 24, 1997	466310	10.69
32	10	"I Didn't Write This"	Pamela Fryman	Lisa Albert	December 8, 1997	466309	11.50
33	11	"Yule Never Know"	Philip Charles MacKenzie	Mimi Friedman & Jeanette Collins	December 15, 1997	466311	10.69
34	12	"A Kiss is Just Amiss"	Tom Moore	Christopher Vane	January 5, 1998	466312	12.85
35	13	"The Big Shalom"	Alan Rafkin	Rick Singer & Andrew Green	January 12, 1998	466313	12.04
36	14	"Matchmaker, Matchmaker"	Alan Rafkin	Becky Hartman Edwards	January 19, 1998	466314	11.81
37	15	"Car Trouble"	Shelley Jensen	Phil Baker & Drew Vaupen	January 26, 1998	466315	11.12
38	16	"Ready...Aim...Fong!"	Shelley Jensen	Chuck Tatham	February 2, 1998	466316	12.28
39	17	"Daddy Piper"	Joyce Gittlin	Dan O'Shannon	March 9, 1998	466317	11.29
40	18	"Not in This Life"	Leonard R. Garner Jr.	Christopher Vane	March 16, 1998	466318	10.03
41	19	"Models and Strippers and Wasps, Oh My!"	Tom Moore	David Kirkwood	April 6, 1998	466319	9.16
42	20	"Poetry in Notion"	Joanna Kerns	Becky Hartman Edwards	April 6, 1998	466320	9.32
43	21	"Pucker Up"	Philip Charles MacKenzie	Andrew Green	April 13, 1998	466323	9.71
44	22	"5,947 Miles"	Philip Charles MacKenzie	Jana Barto	April 20, 1998	466324	8.84
45	23	"A Tale of Two Pants"	Roger Christiansen	Michael McCarthy	May 4, 1998	466321	9.59
46	24	"A Tale of Two Pants"	Alan Rafkin	Rick Singer	May 4, 1998	466322	9.59
47	25	"Oh, How They Danced"	Shelley Jensen	Steven Peterman & Gary Dontzig	May 18, 1998	466325	12.28
48	26	"Oh, How They Danced"	Shelley Jensen	Steven Peterman & Gary Dontzig	May 18, 1998	466326	12.28

=== Season 3 (1998–99) ===
No. overall	No. in season	Title	Directed by	Written by	Original release date	Prod. code	Viewers (millions)
49	1	"Birds Do It, Bees Do It, Even Some of These Do It"	Shelley Jensen	Steven Peterman & Gary Dontzig	September 21, 1998	467351	11.96
50	2	"Feels Like the First Time"	Shelley Jensen	Christopher Vane	September 28, 1998	467352	10.90
51	3	"Don't Tell"	Philip Charles MacKenzie	Maria Semple	October 5, 1998	467353	11.08
52	4	"Sleeping with the Enemy"	Philip Charles MacKenzie	Phil Baker & Drew Vaupen	October 12, 1998	467354	10.77
53	5	"A Funny Thing Happened on the Way to Susan's Party"	Alan Rafkin	Chuck Tatham	October 26, 1998	467357	10.35
54	6	"War Games"	Philip Charles MacKenzie	Rick Singer	November 2, 1998	467355	11.34
55	7	"Seems Like Old Times"	Alan Rafkin	Becky Hartman Edwards	November 9, 1998	467358	9.05
56	8	"Trash-Test Dummies"	Alan Rafkin	Andrew Green	November 16, 1998	467356	9.96
57	9	"The Thanksgiving Episode"	Shelley Jensen	Chuck Tatham	November 30, 1998	467359	10.36
58	10	"The Apartment Hunt"	Shelley Jensen	Maria Semple	November 30, 1998	467360	11.61
59	11	"Merry Ex-Mas"	Shelley Jensen	Rick Singer	December 14, 1998	467361	10.68
60	12	"Wedding-Bell Blues"	Leonard R. Garner Jr.	Christopher Vane	January 11, 1999	467362	9.88
61	13	"On a Clear Day You Can Hear Forever"	Leonard R. Garner Jr.	Becky Hartman Edwards	January 18, 1999	467363	10.70
62	14	"One Man's Intervention Is Another Man's Tupperware Party"	Roger Christiansen	Gary Dontzig & Steven Peterman	January 25, 1999	467364	8.48
63	15	"Sometimes You Feel Like a Nut"	Shelley Jensen	Polly Levy	February 8, 1999	467365	10.08
64	16	"Ben Rubenstein, Meet Joe Black"	Shelley Jensen	Andrew Green	February 22, 1999	467366	10.38
65	17	"The Song Remains Insane"	Philip Charles MacKenzie	Michael McCarthy	March 1, 1999	467368	9.66
66	18	"Revenge of the Gophers"	Roger Christiansen	Phil Baker & Drew Vaupen	March 15, 1999	467367	9.61
67	19	"In This Corner...Susan Keane!: Part 1"	Philip Charles MacKenzie	Chuck Tatham	May 3, 1999	467369	7.62
68	20	"In This Corner...Susan Keane!: Part 2"	Philip Charles MacKenzie	Andrew Green	May 10, 1999	467370	7.43
69	21	"The First Picture Show"	Michael Kelly	Phil Baker & Drew Vaupen	May 17, 1999	467371	7.67
70	22	"Bowled Over"	Shelley Jensen	Jana Barto	May 24, 1999	467372	8.63
71	23	"A Day in the Life"	Alan Rafkin	Story by : Maria Semple & Christopher Vane; Teleplay by : Rick Singer	May 24, 1999	467373	12.35

=== Season 4 (1999–2000) ===
No. overall	No. in season	Title	Directed by	Written by	Original release date	Prod. code	Viewers (millions)
72	1	"The New Gate"	Lee Shallat Chemel	Mark Driscoll & Maria Semple	September 20, 1999	225501	8.07
73	2	"The Billboard"	Lee Shallat-Chemel	Mark Driscoll & Maria Semple	September 27, 1999	225504	6.87
74	3	"The Pushkin Letters"	Lee Shallat-Chemel	David Babcock	October 4, 1999	225503	4.77
75	4	"Vicki Moves In"	Lee Shallat-Chemel	Sylvia Green	October 11, 1999	225505	6.27
76	5	"Halloween"	Andrew Tsao	Ellen Idelson & Rob Lotterstein	October 18, 1999	225506	6.59
77	6	"Cheerleaders"	Andrew Tsao	David Flebotte	November 1, 1999	225507	7.42
78	7	"The Wish List"	Andrew Tsao	Ellen Idelson & Rob Lotterstein	December 6, 1999	225508	6.69
79	8	"First Date"	Alan Rafkin	David Babcock	December 13, 1999	225509	6.66
80	9	"The Birthday Party"	Roger Christiansen	Joel H. Cohen	December 20, 1999	225511	5.94
81	10	"Susan's Ex"	Craig Zisk	Robert Peacock	December 27, 1999	225512	6.05
82	11	"Luis Gets His Groove Back"	Lee Shallat-Chemel	Ed Yeager	December 27, 1999	225502	6.21
83	12	"Dinner Party"	Andrew Tsao	Story by : David Wright; Teleplay by : Stacy Traub	January 3, 2000	225514	7.46
84	13	"Stock Tip"	Andrew Tsao	Beth Seriff & Geoff Tarson	January 3, 2000	225513	7.45
85	14	"I Love You"	Andrew Tsao	Story by : Anne Rovak; Teleplay by : Sylvia Green	June 6, 2000	225515	4.32
86	15	"The Break Up"	Andrew Tsao	Stacy Traub	June 13, 2000	225516	4.75
87	16	"Girls Night Out"	Dana deVally Piazza	Robert Peacock	June 20, 2000	225518	5.76
88	17	"The Bird in the Wall"	Gordon Hunt	Lisa K. Nelson & Tod Himmel	June 27, 2000	225517	4.59
89	18	"The Gay Parade"	Alan Rafkin	Lisa K. Nelson & Tod Himmel	Unaired	225510	N/A
90	19	"Susan and the Professor"	Roger Christiansen	Beth Seriff & Geoff Tarson	December 26, 2000	225519	N/A
91	20	"The Reversal"	Michael Kelly	Story by : Mike Dieffenbach; Teleplay by : Joel H. Cohen	December 26, 2000	225520	N/A
92	21	"The Finale: Part 1"	Andrew Tsao	Ellen Idelson & Rob Lotterstein	December 26, 2000	225521	N/A
93	22	"The Finale: Part 2"	Andrew Tsao	Ellen Idelson & Rob Lotterstein	December 26, 2000	225522	N/A

== Production ==
=== Original pilot ===
In the show's original pilot, written by Billy Van Zandt and Jane Milmore and based on a dramatic script by Clyde Phillips, Susan worked at a publishing house editing children's books. After breaking up with her live-in boyfriend Ted (Brian McNamara), Susan finds herself "single" for the first time in years. Concurrently, Susan faces even greater challenges at work when her boss, Eric (Philip Casnoff), assigns her the task of working as an editor with Charlotte (Elizabeth Ashley), a hugely successful and highly opinionated romance novelist. Always on hand to provide support is Susan's grandmother, Nana (Nancy Marchand), her co-workers, acerbic best friend Marcy (Maggie Wheeler) and Neil (David Krumholtz), who has a crush on Susan.

When the series was picked up, former Murphy Brown writers/producers Gary Dontzig and Steven Peterman were brought in to redevelop the concept, being appointed as the show's co-showrunners. Other changes between the pilot and the series included Barbara Barrie replacing Nancy Marchand in the role of Nana, and Swoosie Kurtz and Ray Baker replacing Kurt Fuller and Caroline McWilliams as Susan's parents, Bill and Liz; the characters of Eric and Ted were reworked into the roles of Jack Richmond (played by Nelson) and his brother, Kip (Anthony Starke), whom Susan jilts during their wedding. (McNamara would later play Cooper Elliot, a friend of Jack's who briefly replaces him as publisher of The Gate through a poker game bet and takes Susan to Italy at the end of Season 1.) In the series, though the setting switches from a publishing house to a magazine, the main office set retained most of its features from the pilot; the most noticeable difference was that the elevator was at stage right. While the pilot's storyline featuring Elizabeth Ashley as one of the publishing house's clients was not used in the series, a cardboard cut out of Ashley that was featured in the pilot appears throughout the first three seasons of the show – it can be seen briefly behind Susan's desk, near the filing cabinets along the back wall.

The actual location for the exterior shots of the office was the Newhall Building at 260 California Street in San Francisco.

=== Death of David Strickland ===
David Strickland died by suicide in a Las Vegas motel room on March 22, 1999. Strickland's death was later incorporated into the show's third season finale, "A Day in the Life", which killed off his character, Todd Stites. The episode's plot finds Susan desperately trying to find Todd when she suspects he has gone missing after he fails to show up to work one morning. As the episode progresses, Susan learns about a number of good deeds that Todd had done around his neighborhood that she never knew about. In-character interviews with the supporting cast also appear throughout the episode, with each actor sharing their personal experiences they had with Strickland before his death, framed as each character's own memories of Todd. As the episode comes to an end, Todd's favorite song, "Praise You" by Fatboy Slim, plays outside of Luis' apartment as Susan and her co-workers sit in a circle praying for Todd's well-being. At last, the phone in the middle of the room rings, but the camera cuts away before the news of Todd's fate can be revealed. The episode ends with memorable clips of Strickland from the show and the memorial subtitle: "The Gods of comedy looked down upon you and smiled".

=== Fourth season and cancellation ===
Suddenly Susan Season 4 cast photo

Before production began on the fourth and final season, Judd Nelson and Andrea Bendewald left the show; Peterman and Dontzig also stepped down as showrunners, and the series replaced almost its entire writing staff (with the exception of executive producer Maria Semple, who joined the show at the start of Season 3 and took over showrunning duties alongside Mark Driscoll, one of the new writers hired for the fourth season). The departures of Nelson and Bendewald, along with the death of Strickland, prompted Driscoll and Semple to retool the series: The Gate was transformed into a men's magazine by its new owner, Ian Maxtone-Graham (Eric Idle), and relocated from its trendy uptown offices overlooking the bay to a dingy former warehouse in Chinatown. In tow, Ian brought his own team of workers, including executive assistant and U.S. Navy veteran Miranda Charles (Sherri Shepherd), sports writer Nate Knaborski (Currie Graham), and freelance photographer Oliver Browne (Rob Estes). Faced with new challenges, Susan suddenly had to prove herself all over again.

Airing between Seinfeld and ER during its first season, Suddenly Susan was initially a ratings success, attracting almost 25 million viewers per episode, despite mostly unfavorable critical reviews. When the show was moved to Monday nights at 8:00 p.m. (against the Top 30 hit Cosby) for the second season, the show experienced a large decline in viewership, sliding from #3 to #71 in one year, bringing in less than 11 million viewers. The ratings failed to bounce back, and in its final season, the show barely ranked in the top 100, prompting NBC to pull it from the schedule in January. It returned briefly in June, but at the end of the month was pulled from the network's prime-time schedule with five episodes left unaired. One episode, "The Gay Parade", remained unaired by NBC (but was eventually shown on Lifetime a few years later); the final four episodes (including the two-part series finale) were burned off from 2:00 to 4:00 a.m. EST on December 26, 2000, airing as part of the NBC All Night overnight block.

== Reception ==
On Rotten Tomatoes, season 1 has an approval rating of 55% based on reviews from 11 critics. The website's critical consensus was: "Comedic inspiration doesn't spark Suddenly for this Susan, hampered by derivative gags that undermine Brooke Shields' energetic performance."

Caryn James of the New York Times wrote: "Like its lead character, Suddenly Susan has no identity of its own. The beauty of the magic time slot is that it gives Suddenly Susan, with its engaging star and flexible format, a well-deserved chance to grow."

Ken Tucker of Entertainment Weekly gave it a grade C and called it: "A wearyingly self-conscious updating of The Mary Tyler Moore Show: nice girl trying to make it in the competitive workplace of a big town."

=== Ratings history ===
Season	TV Season	Episodes	Season premiere	Season finale	Time slot (ET)	Rank	Viewers (in millions)
1	1996–97	22	September 19, 1996	May 8, 1997	Thursday at 9:30 pm (Episodes 1–12); Thursday at 8:30 pm (Episodes 13–22)	#3	16.5
2	1997–98	26	September 22, 1997	May 18, 1998	Monday at 8:00 pm (Episodes 1–19, 21–23, 25); Monday at 8:30 pm (Episodes 20, 24, 26)	#65	7.9
3	1998–99	23	September 21, 1998	May 24, 1999	Monday at 8:00 pm (Episodes 1–9, 11–22); Monday at 8:30 pm (Episodes 10, 23)	#81	9.5
4	1999–2000	22^{[a]}	September 20, 1999	June 27, 2000^{[b]}	Monday at 8:00 pm (Episodes 1–10, 12); Monday at 8:30 pm (Episodes 11, 13); Tuesday at 8:00 pm (Episodes 14–17)	#94	6.6

^{^[a]}Twenty-three episodes were produced for season four, but episode 18, "The Gay Parade" was never broadcast.
^{^[b]}End of the series' original broadcast run. Last four episodes were aired six months later.
