= Russ Woody =

American novelist

- Education: California State University, Chico
- Occupations: Author; television producer; writer
- Years active: 1981–present

Russ Woody is an American author, television producer and writer.

== Career ==
Woody grew up in Walnut Creek, California. In 1979, he graduated from California State University, Chico with a bachelor's degree in Broadcast Journalism and a minor in Speech and Drama.

Since the early 1980s, he has amassed a number of producing and writing credits in television in the series Benson, Fantasy Island, Webster, Newhart, Valerie's Family, St. Elsewhere, Hill Street Blues, Parenthood, Good Sports, Room for Two, Double Rush, Mad About You, The Drew Carey Show, Cybill (for which he won a Golden Globe Award), Style & Substance, Becker, True Jackson, VP, Notes from the Underbelly, The Middle and Murphy Brown, for which he won a Primetime Emmy Award as a part of the show's writing team. He also worked as a production assistant on Bosom Buddies and Family Ties.

== Personal life ==
Woody currently lives in Los Angeles and Ventura with his wife, Catherine, and his sons, Henry and Joe.
