= Gary Dontzig =

American television producer, screenwriter and actor (1946–2026)

- Born: March 18, 1946; New York City, U.S.
- Died: February 23, 2026 (aged 79); Los Angeles, California, U.S.
- Occupations: Television producer, screenwriter, actor
- Notable work: Murphy Brown, Suddenly Susan, State of Grace, Becker, Hannah Montana
- Partner: Gary Campbell

Gary Dontzig (March 18, 1946 – February 23, 2026) was an American television producer, screenwriter and actor. He worked as a writer/producer for television programs including Murphy Brown, Suddenly Susan, Becker, and Hannah Montana. He and his writing partner, Steven Peterman, wrote for the second season of W.I.T.C.H., having been hired by their long-time friend and neighbor Greg Weisman.

Dontzig won two Primetime Emmy Awards and was nominated for three more in the categories Outstanding Comedy Series and Outstanding Writing for a Comedy Series from 1991 to 1993. In addition to his television work, he wrote plays and taught at American University.

Dontzig was born in New York City on March 18, 1946. He died of an autoimmune syndrome at the Cedars-Sinai Medical Center in Los Angeles, on February 23, 2026, at the age of 79.
