= Faith Ford =

American actress (born 1964)

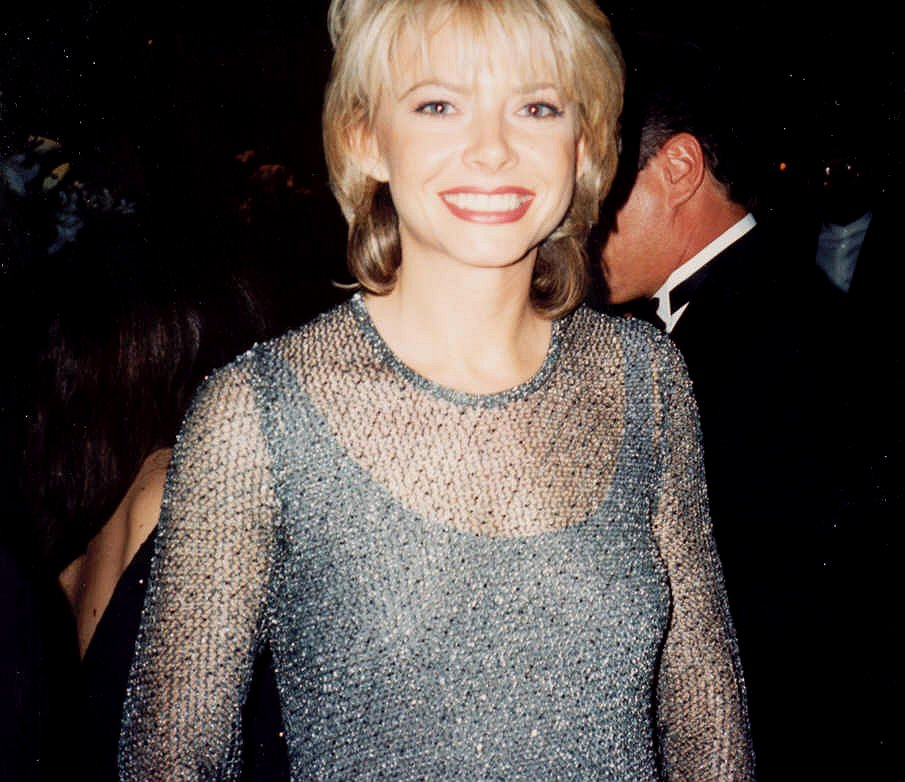
- Ford at the 1994 Emmy Awards
- Born: Faith Alexis Ford; September 14, 1964 (age 61); Alexandria, Louisiana, U.S.
- Occupation: Actress
- Years active: 1983–present
- Spouses: Robert Nottingham (m. 1989–1996); Campion Murphy (m. 1998)

Faith Alexis Ford (born September 14, 1964) is an American actress. She played Corky Sherwood on the CBS sitcom Murphy Brown, receiving five Primetime Emmy Award nominations. She also played Hope Shanowski on the ABC sitcom Hope & Faith.

== Early life ==
Ford was born Faith Alexis Ford in Alexandria, Louisiana. She is the younger daughter of Patricia Walker, a schoolteacher, and Charles Ford, an insurance agent. Ford lived in nearby Pineville and began acting while attending Pineville High School. At 17, she moved to Manhattan, where she began modeling and acting.

== Career ==
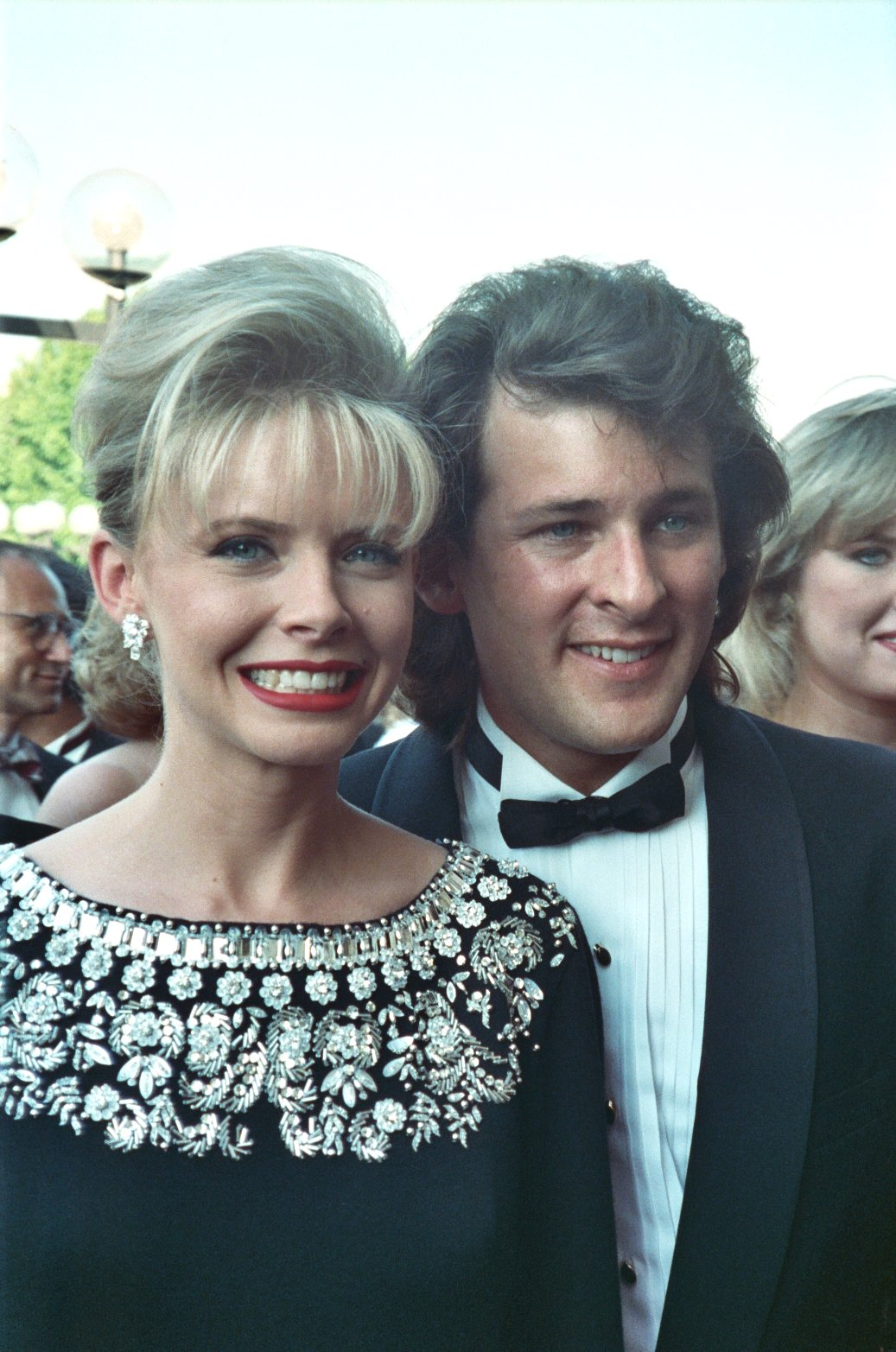
Ford with her former husband Robert Nottingham at 1990 Emmy Awards

In 1983, Ford landed her first television role on ABC's One Life to Live. Her first major role was playing the Julia Shearer character for several years on the NBC soap opera Another World, a role Kyra Sedgwick previously played. Ford then moved to Hollywood, where she got a regular role on the short-lived sitcom The Popcorn Kid. She then had a five-episode appearance on thirtysomething, played a homeless woman on Family Ties, and joined Murphy Brown. After the series’s ten-year run, Ford pursued other TV endeavors. In 1998, she executive-produced her own short-lived sitcom, Maggie Winters. Ford also appeared on The Norm Show with Norm Macdonald, Laurie Metcalf, and Artie Lange from 1999 to 2001.

Ford starred in Hope & Faith for three years with Kelly Ripa, playing Hope Fairfield-Shanowski, a homemaker living a peaceful life until her sister, a star Hollywood actress, moves in and complicates her life.

In 2004, she published her own cookbook, Cooking with Faith, crediting her mother and two grandmothers for teaching her how to cook. In the Disney film released in early 2005, The Pacifier, Ford played the mother of a family whose husband had died. In 2007, she appeared in the sitcom Carpoolers. In June 2009, she spoke about her series and the future of digital programming at the Digital Content NewFront. In 2011, Ford appeared in the Disney teen film, Prom, playing the role of Kitty Prescott, mother of the main character Nova Prescott, played by Aimee Teegarden.

On February 26, 2018, it was announced that Ford would return to a revival of Murphy Brown with costars Candice Bergen, Joe Regalbuto, and Grant Shaud. She appeared in all 13 episodes.

== Personal life ==
Ford was married to Robert Nottingham from 1989 to 1996. She has been married to writer/director Campion Murphy since 1998. Ford and Murphy coproduced an original short film entitled Citation of Merit, which appeared in numerous film festivals across the United States.

Ford has been diagnosed with Graves' disease.

Her sister, Devon O'Day, also is in the entertainment industry, most notably in radio.

== Filmography ==
=== Film ===
Year	Title	Role	Notes
1987	You Talkin' to Me?	Dana Archer	
1993	For Goodness Sake		Short film
1994	North	Donna Nelson	
1998	Sometimes They Come Back... for More	Dr. Jennifer Wells	
2003	Beethoven's 5th	Sheriff Julie Dempsey	
2005	The Pacifier	Julie Plummer	
2011	Prom	Kitty Prescott	
2011	Escapee	Det. Alison Jensen	
2013	The Day I Finally Decided to Kill Myself	Sally	Short film
2019	Jake and Kyle Get Wedding Dates	Holly Westen (voice)	Direct-to-video
2023	We Have a Ghost	Barbara Mangold	

=== Television ===
Year	Title	Role	Notes
1983	One Life to Live	Muffy Critchlow	Series regular
1983–1984	Another World	Julia Shearer	Series regular
1985	Hardcastle and McCormick	Tina Cutler	Episode: "The Career Breaker"
1986	Webster	Terry Berman	Episode: "Almost Home"
1986	Scarecrow and Mrs. King	Tina Cutler	Episode: "All the World's a Stage"
1986	Cagney & Lacey	Karen Price	Episode: "Rites of Passage"
1987	The Popcorn Kid	Lynn Holly Brickhouse	Series regular (6 episodes)
1987	If It's Tuesday, It Still Must Be Belgium	Kalin Brewster	Television film
1987–1988	thirtysomething	Janine	5 episodes
1988–1998, 2018	Murphy Brown	Corky Sherwood	Main role (250 episodes); Nominated: American Comedy Award for Funniest Supporting Actress in a Comedy Series (1990, 1996); Golden Globe Award for Best Supporting Actress – Series, Miniseries or Television Film (1991–92); Primetime Emmy Award for Outstanding Supporting Actress in a Comedy Series (1989–92, 1994); Screen Actors Guild Award for Outstanding Performance by an Ensemble in a Comedy Series
1990	Murder, She Wrote	Sunny Albertson	Episode: "Good-Bye Charlie"
1993	Poisoned by Love: The Kern County Murders	Joyce Catlin	Television film
1993	The Hidden Room	Iris / Ruth	Episode: "The Third Option"
1996	A Weekend in the Country	Susan Kaye	Television film
1996	Her Desperate Choice	Jody Murdock	Television film
1996	Night Visitors	Kelly Wells	Television film
1998–1999	Maggie Winters	Maggie Winters	Series regular (16 episodes)
1999–2001	The Norm Show	Shelly Kilmartin	Series regular (29 episodes)
2000	Family Guy	Corky Sherwood/Sarah Bennett	Episodes: "A Picture's Worth a Thousand Bucks" "I Am Peter, Hear Me Roar"
2002	Mom's on Strike	Pam Harris	Television film
2003–2006	Hope & Faith	Hope Shanowski	Lead role (73 episodes)
2007–2008	Carpoolers	Leila Brooker	Series regular (13 episodes)
2008	Criminal Minds	Vanessa Hill	Episode: "Normal"
2008	A Kiss at Midnight	Susan Flowers	Television film
2009	The Fish Tank	Ann	Pilot
2009	My Name Is Earl	Rachel McGann	Episode: "Got the Babysitter Pregnant"
2009	Sorority Wars	Summer	Television film
2011	Field of Vision	Jody McFarland	Television film
2011	Trading Christmas	Emily	Television film
2015	The Middle	Sheila	Episode: "Thanksgiving VII" (season 7)
2015	The Bridge	Donna Bartons	Television film
2016	The Bridge Part 2	Donna Bartons	Television film
2017	Christmas in Mississippi	Caroline Logan	Television film
2022	Killing It	Angelica	2 episodes
2023	Night Court	Gina Stone	Episode: "Blood Moon Binga" (season 1, episode 8)

== Accolades ==
In 2017, she won the MovieGuide Grace Award for her role in The Bridge, Part 2.
