= List of NewsRadio episodes =

NewsRadio is an American sitcom, originally broadcast from 1995 to 1999 by NBC. In total, 97 episodes were broadcast spanning 5 seasons.

== Series overview ==
Season	Episodes	Originally released	
Season	Episodes	First released	Last released
1	7	March 21, 1995	May 9, 1995
2	21	September 19, 1995	April 28, 1996
3	25	September 18, 1996	June 5, 1997
4	22	September 23, 1997	May 12, 1998
5	22	September 23, 1998	May 4, 1999

== Episodes ==
=== Season 1 (1995) ===
No. overall	No. in season	Title	Directed by	Written by	Original release date	Prod. code	Viewers (millions)
1	1	"Pilot"	James Burrows	Paul Simms	March 21, 1995	100	17.8
Wisconsin native Dave Nelson arrives in New York to start his new job as the News Director at WNYX. His first task: fire the old News Director. Guest stars Kurt Fuller as Ed Harlow, Greg Lee as Rick, Wallace Langham as Jeff, Beau Billingslea as The Security Guard, and Ella Joyce as Catherine Duke. Neither Joe Rogan nor Khandi Alexander appear in the pilot. Greg Lee's "Rick" character is similar to Rogan's "Joe" character, and Ella Joyce plays "Catherine." Catherine's last name is not revealed in this episode. Joyce is mostly offscreen, though she can be heard delivering several newscasts (and can be very briefly glimpsed in the broadcast booth in a few shots). She is seen clearly towards the end of the episode standing outside the broadcast booth, but has no lines during this scene. Ray Romano was originally slated to play the "Electrician" character, but both Romano and the show's producers mutually agreed that he was not a good fit for the show.
2	2	"Inappropriate"	James Burrows	Paul Simms	March 28, 1995	102	16.3
Dave and Lisa's disagreement over how to respond to an on-air gaffe by Matthew leads to a romantic encounter and the start of a secret office relationship. Guest stars Kenny Johnston as Danny. This is the first appearance of Joe Rogan as Joe and Khandi Alexander as Catherine.
3	3	"Smoking"	James Burrows	Josh Lieb & Brad Isaacs & Paul Simms	April 4, 1995	103	15.4
Bill is having trouble complying with a new anti-smoking ordinance, so Dave tries to help him quit. Guest stars Monte Russell as Paramedic.
4	4	"The Crisis"	James Burrows	Josh Lieb	April 11, 1995	101	12.9
Coverage of a subway accident is hampered by petty jealousies surrounding Matthew's new desk. Guest stars Steve Arlen as Bob, and Mark Davenport as Delivery Man.
5	5	"Big Day"	Alan Myerson	Joe Furey & Brad Isaacs & Josh Lieb & Paul Simms	April 18, 1995	105	15.5
The staff unwittingly confide in Dave their expectations for their annual bonus, not knowing that Jimmy has delegated the task to Dave. During this episode, food humorously keeps appearing on Bill's desk. Guest stars Albie Selznick as Copy Guy, and Joe Wein as Delivery Guy.
6	6	"Luncheon at the Waldorf"	Peter Baldwin	Brad Isaacs	May 2, 1995	104	13.1
Lisa is worried about Bill's motivation for taking Beth to a broadcaster's luncheon. Dave has to deal with the station being grossly over-budget.
7	7	"Sweeps Week"	Peter Bonerz	Joe Furey & Paul Simms	May 9, 1995	106	12.9
Dave's ex-girlfriend from Wisconsin arrives for a visit, under the assumption that they are still dating, and proceeds to make Lisa nervous. Guest stars Janeane Garofalo as Nancy, and Bill Geisslinger as Tom P. Baxter.

=== Season 2 (1995–96) ===
No. overall	No. in season	Title	Directed by	Written by	Original release date	Prod. code	Viewers (millions)
8	1	"No, This Is Not Based Entirely on Julie's Life"	Alan Myerson	Paul Simms	September 19, 1995	202	16.1
Beth attempts to take nude pictures of herself for her boyfriend. Joe tries to find out who has been stealing his gelato. Guest stars Chris Kattan as Employee #3. Steve Susskind debuts as Milos the Janitor. The episode title (not seen on screen) is an inside joke amongst the production staff, referring to producer Julie Bean.
9	2	"Goofy Ball"	Alan Myerson	Paul Simms	September 26, 1995	201	15.7
Mr. James introduces the staff to "Goofy Ball," an annoying toy made by one of his companies. Dave and Lisa consider revealing their relationship. Bill has a stalker, and buys a taser which has been built by Joe. Guest stars Dennis Miller as The Stalker, Judd Apatow as the voice of the Goofy Ball, Alison Brahe as Sheila, Wendy Hamilton as Emily and Elisabeth Sjoli as Carol
10	3	"Rat Funeral"	Alan Myerson	Paul Simms & Lewis Morton	October 10, 1995	205	18.4
Dave is mystified by the staff's affection for a rat living in the station. When the rat dies, the staff holds a funeral.
11	4	"The Breakup"	Peter Bonerz	Paul Simms	October 31, 1995	206	13.6
Beth forces Dave and Lisa to reveal their relationship to the staff when she gets caught in the middle of a bad break-up fight.
12	5	"Shrink"	Michael Lembeck	Andrew Gordon & Eileen Conn	November 7, 1995	208	16.8
Dave agrees to bring in a therapist to counsel the staff and relieve some of the tension in the office. Guest stars John Ritter as Dr. Frank Westford.
13	6	"Friends"	Michael Lembeck	Brian Kelley & Josh Lieb	November 14, 1995	209	17.1
Dave hires a temp to help Beth organize the station's files. Guest stars Bebe Neuwirth as Sandi Angelini. Recurring characters Tone Lōc as Security Guard (Lorenzo), and Toby Huss as Guard #2 (Junior).
14	7	"Bill's Autobiography"	Michael Lembeck	Joe Furey	November 21, 1995	207	14.9
Bill receives an offer to publish his autobiography, but he soon realizes that there is not much in his life worth committing to paper.
15	8	"Negotiation"	Leonard R. Garner Jr.	Dawn DeKeyser	November 28, 1995	210	14.3
Matthew receives a meaningless promotion and his efforts to organize the station are sabotaged by Bill. Lisa tries to find another job, giving a screen test interviewing Anthrax for MTV. Mr. James begins his search for a wife using business tactics, starting with a list of 36 women. Guest stars Anthrax, and Natalia Nogulich as Melanie Sanders.
16	9	"The Cane"	Alan Myerson	Brad Isaacs	December 12, 1995	204	14.4
Mr. James hosts a staff retreat in his office. Bill buys a cane and annoys Dave with it. Guest stars Jane Lynch as Carol.
17	10	"Xmas Story"	Leonard R. Garner Jr.	Lewis Morton	December 19, 1995	212	18.6
Mr. James buys sports cars for everyone on the staff except for Matthew, who gets tapes. Bill thinks that the Santa Claus down in the lobby is stalking him. Guest stars David Anthony Higgins as Santa; Recurring characters Tone Lōc as Lorenzo, and Toby Huss as Junior.
18	11	"Station Sale"	Tom Cherones	Leslie Caveny, Brian Kelley, Lewis Morton, Joe Furey, Josh Lieb, & Paul Simms	January 7, 1996	211	21.5
The staff tries to convince Jimmy not to sell the station. Bill misquotes Alfred Tennyson's "The Charge of the Light Brigade" and then attributes it to John Keats. The date he gives, 1776, is 19 years before Keats was born and 78 years before the poem was published. Jimmy's wife candidate list has narrowed to 29. Loretta Swit is mentioned as having been crossed off. Guest stars Maureen Mueller as Jane.
19	12	"Bitch Session"	James Burrows	Brian Kelley	January 14, 1996	213	16.7
Dave accidentally overhears the staff complaining about him.
20	13	"In Through the Out Door"	Patrick Maloney	Leslie Caveny, Joe Furey, Alan J. Higgins, Josh Lieb, Drake Sather, & Paul Simms	February 4, 1996	217	18.4
Joe tries to teach Matthew about gambling. Dave has to give a speech introducing Bill at a dinner. Beginning with this episode and continuing through the end of season two, each episode is titled after a Led Zeppelin album. Steve Susskind returns as Milos the Janitor.
21	14	"The Song Remains the Same"	Tom Cherones	Sam Johnson, Chris Marcil, Joe Furey, & Lewis Morton	February 18, 1996	218	12.5
Beth discovers that she has a secret admirer. Mr. James plays April Fool's pranks in the office, despite it being February, resulting in Catherine being drenched in water and Matthew getting green slimed. Meanwhile a reporter from The Wall Street Journal interviews Bill.
22	15	"Zoso"	James Burrows	Josh Lieb, Lewis Morton, Joe Furey, & Paul Simms	February 25, 1996	214	15.4
Beth and Lisa ask Mr. James to teach them how to negotiate. Lisa asks Dave for a raise. Guest stars George Hamilton as Don Green.
23	16	"Houses of the Holy"	Gregg Heschong	Dawn DeKeyser, Brian Kelley, Joe Furey, & Paul Simms	March 10, 1996	215	14.1
Catherine is out sick, so Bill puts Joe on the air in order to frustrate Dave's plans. Meanwhile, Beth becomes enamored of Mr. James' weird nephew Theo (guest star David Cross.)
24	17	"Physical Graffiti"	Patrick Maloney	Josh Lieb & Paul Simms	March 24, 1996	216	14.7
Bill and Catherine's practical joke war escalates. Dave is annoyed that Lisa still has a relationship with her ex-boyfriend.
25	18	"Led Zeppelin"	Patrick Maloney	Leslie Caveny	March 31, 1996	221	15.8
Lisa and Dave have broken up, and Lisa will communicate with Dave only in writing.
26	19	"Presence"	Lee Shallat Chemel	Alan J. Higgins & Josh Lieb	April 14, 1996	219	14.5
Jimmy loses Bill in a poker game, and Lisa has to try to win him back. In the episode, a Star Wars Boba Fett action figure is shown and discussed in several scenes, which the commentary notes required permission from Lucasfilm. "BOBA FETT COURTESY OF J.T. HUTT" appears in the episode's credits.
27	20	"Coda"	Lee Shallat Chemel	Brian Kelley, Lewis Morton, Josh Lieb, & Paul Simms	April 21, 1996	220	12.8
Dave, Bill and Mr. James work on a promotional spot. Lisa helps Joe study for a test. Matthew tries to sign up people for a summer house in the Hamptons. Steve Susskind returns as Milos the Janitor.
28	21	"Led Zeppelin II"	James Burrows	Drake Sather	April 28, 1996	222	19.0
The building catches fire, bringing Dave and Lisa back together. Mr. James thinks he has found the ideal woman.

=== Season 3 (1996–97) ===
No. overall	No. in season	Title	Directed by	Written by	Original release date	Prod. code	Viewers (millions)
29	1	"President"	Tom Cherones	Paul Simms	September 18, 1996	302	12.6
Jimmy announces he is running for President of the United States. Matthew grows some facial hair while on vacation. Guest stars Al Roker as Guy.
30	2	"Review"	Tom Cherones	Josh Lieb	September 25, 1996	301	11.0
Matthew discovers the comic strip Dilbert and quits his job when Dave refuses to let him do a story about it. Dave tries to reassure the staff that an underwhelming magazine critique is not as bad as it sounds. Guest stars Scott Adams as coffee shop patron, Michael Adler as man pretending to be Scott Adams, and Mark Fite as coffee shop counterman.
31	3	"Massage Chair"	Tom Cherones	Lewis Morton	October 2, 1996	303	10.6
Bill buys a massage chair in defiance of budget cuts at the station. Dave fights Mr. James over the elimination of free snacks from the breakroom.
32	4	"Arcade"	Tom Cherones	Brian Kelley	October 23, 1996	304	10.8
Beth replaces the lobby sandwich machine with the arcade game Stargate Defender, causing Dave's old video game obsession to resurface. Bill is upset because he finds the sandwiches from the old machine to be delicious, and begins hoarding them. After a series of mental lapses, Lisa and Dave retake the SATs to see if they are getting dumber. Guest stars Eugene Jarvis, Wesley Jonathan, and Leelee Sobieski.
33	5	"Halloween"	Tom Cherones	Sam Johnson & Chris Marcil	October 30, 1996	307	12.1
The staff is not invited to Mr. James' annual Halloween party because he thinks they're "too cool for school." Dave and Lisa persuade him to let them come. Bill becomes depressed after a psychic tells him the exact date of his death, but then falls in love with an elderly woman.
34	6	"Awards Show"	Tom Cherones	Drake Sather	November 6, 1996	305	11.3
The staff attends an awards banquet. Matthew frets over his belief that the breakroom is infested with ants. Guest stars Bob Costas as himself, Johnny Crear as elderly man, Steven Gilborn as Marty "The Party" Jackson, and Kevin J. O'Neill as bartender.
35	7	"Daydream"	Tom Cherones	Paul Simms	November 13, 1996	308	10.7
A hot day and a broken air conditioner cause the thoughts of every character to drift. This episode is filled with movie/television parodies, particularly Beth's hallucinations, which are inspired by the horror films she saw with Matthew (Aliens, A Nightmare on Elm Street). At the end of the episode, Mr. James has a hallucination (or does he?) that spoofs the famous ending to St. Elsewhere's series finale.
36	8	"Movie Star"	Tom Cherones	Lew Morton	November 20, 1996	309	10.4
James Caan visits Bill as part of research for his new movie, but he soon becomes fixated by Matthew's odd behavior. Dave tries to buy a television set for Lisa. Superfan Jimmy James has an extra Knicks ticket, and Joe conducts a trivia contest between Beth and Catherine to determine who gets the seat. Guest stars James Caan as himself.
37	9	"Stocks"	Tom Cherones	Alan J. Higgins	December 11, 1996	306	10.3
Jimmy teaches Beth how to play the stock market, but refuses to help Bill. Matthew pretends to have flown to Japan, bringing back gifts for the office, including a samurai katana for Dave. Lisa is reluctant to ask for a new chair because she doesn't want it to look like Dave is playing favorites.
38	10	"Christmas"	Patrick Maloney	Drake Sather	December 18, 1996	311	11.0
Dave covers for his employees so they can leave early, but still manages to take Lisa to Wisconsin before Christmas is over.
39	11	"The Trainer"	Gregg Heschong	Joe Furey	December 19, 1996	312	20.33
Bill joins a gym; the WNYX staff discover a secret about Dave's past. Guest stars Ben Stiller as Vic and Patton Oswalt as Guy.
40	12	"Rap"	Tom Cherones	Story by : Paul Simms & Drake Sather; Teleplay by : Alan J. Higgins & Brian Kelley	January 8, 1997	310	11.68
Bill discovers the evils of rap music. Lisa has a problem with being named "cutest reporter" by a local magazine. Guest stars Chuck D as himself.
41	13	"Led Zeppelin Boxed Set"	Tom Cherones	Story by : Josh Lieb & Joe Furey; Teleplay by : Lew Morton & Chris Marcil & Sam Johnson	January 15, 1997	313	10.13
Matthew finally stands up to Bill's bullying, and proceeds to go on a power trip. Catherine teaches Jimmy how to beat a crooked three card monte dealer.
42	14	"Complaint Box"	Tom Cherones	Story by : Joe Furey & Josh Lieb; Teleplay by : Brian Kelley & Lewis Morton	January 29, 1997	314	9.59
The new complaint box causes problems for Dave. Jimmy goes fishing, while his satellite hookup goes to the movies.
43	15	"Rose Bowl"	Tom Cherones	Story by : Lewis Morton & Paul Simms; Teleplay by : Alan J. Higgins & Josh Lieb	February 5, 1997	315	8.15
Dave agrees to let the staff review each other, while Jimmy takes a con artist to court. Joe teaches Jimmy the secret masonic word "Tubal-cain" that might automatically win him the court case. Guest stars George Lindsey as himself, David Clennon as the Judge, and Glenn Walker Harris Jr. as the con artist.
44	16	"Kids"	Tom Cherones	Story by : Joe Furey & Drake Sather; Teleplay by : Sam Johnson & Chris Marcil	February 12, 1997	316	8.73
Dave must figure out who is leaving pornography around the office in the midst of an elementary school field trip. Jimmy hits on the kids' teacher over a fancy lunch. Guest stars Stephanie Erb as the teacher.
45	17	"Airport"	Tom Cherones	Drake Sather	February 19, 1997	317	8.26
While Bill and Dave are stuck in a St. Louis airport, Lisa runs the office, and Beth and Matthew water Bill's plants. Guest stars Michael James McDonald, Stoney Westmoreland, Jim Fyfe, and Daniel Hagen.
46	18	"Twins"	Tom Cherones	Lewis Morton	March 12, 1997	318	9.84
Matthew's "identical twin" brother Andrew arrives for a visit. Bill's greed almost bankrupts the station. Guest stars Jon Stewart as Andrew. Maura Tierney does not appear in this episode because she was filming Liar Liar.
47	19	"Office Feud"	Leonard R. Garner Jr.	Sam Johnson & Chris Marcil	March 19, 1997	319	9.76
Joe, Dave, and Beth deal with the noisy environmentalists who've moved in upstairs; Lisa covers the Easter Egg hunt at the White House; Bill and Catherine argue over Bill's sponsorship by Rocket Fuel Malt Liquor. Guest stars Sara Paxton as Sara.
48	20	"Our Fiftieth Episode"	Tom Cherones	Story by : Josh Lieb; Teleplay by : Joe Furey & Paul Simms	April 2, 1997	321	9.08
An argument over a traffic ticket gets Bill committed to a mental hospital. Guest stars Jon Lovitz as Fred. All of Vicki Lewis's scenes were shot separate from primary production because she was away filming Mouse Hunt. She is completely absent from the following episode, "Sleeping," for the same reason.
49	21	"Sleeping"	Judi Elterman	Story by : Alan J. Higgins & Paul Simms; Teleplay by : Brian Kelley	May 7, 1997	322	6.87
Matthew hides in the break room fridge to scare anyone who opens it, eventually causing Mr. James to have a heart attack. Mr. James' lawyer shows Dave and Lisa a video tape wherein Mr. James reveals his wish to spend his remaining time with his friends and colleagues at WNYX in the case of a life-threatening illness. Mr. James is moved into the WNYX break room while he recovers from his coma and the staff is asked to talk to him during the day. Lisa decides that she wants to have a baby. Bill recreates his time as a college overnight DJ. Guest stars Scott N. Stevens as Dr. Mandel.
50	22	"The Real Deal"	Tom Cherones	Story by : Josh Lieb & Lew Morton; Teleplay by : Joe Furey & Paul Simms	May 7, 1997	320	7.82
Desperate to keep "The Real Deal" on the air despite floundering ratings, Bill and Lisa attempt to interview Jerry Seinfeld in a restaurant and record the results. Matthew reveals to everybody that he is still a virgin (at 28½), and subsequently loses his virginity to his gorgeous girlfriend in the breakroom. Guest stars Jerry Seinfeld as himself, Bobbie Brown as Irene, Gregg Daniel as Kevin Sparks, Mark Fite as Waiter.
51	23	"Mistake"	Tom Cherones	Story by : Joe Furey & Paul Simms; Teleplay by : Josh Lieb & Drake Sather	May 14, 1997	323	7.06
Dave faces the wrath of the staff when he makes several disparaging comments about them in a magazine article. Matthew feels threatened by the "weird" new temp Brent. Guest stars French Stewart as Brent.
52	24	"Space"	Tom Cherones	Story by : Brian Kelley & Lewis Morton; Teleplay by : Joe Furey & Josh Lieb and Paul Simms	May 21, 1997	324	7.22
WNYX is imagined as a news radio station in space in the future. The crew still have the same jobs, and WNYX is still a radio station. Bill and Catherine read ads ("Soylent Green, made from the best stuff on Earth: people") and news from the future. Meanwhile, Joe is thawed out after more than 80 years of suspended animation to fix the reactor for the station. Jimmy needs to cut the budget, so he needs to have either Bill or Catherine go into suspended animation for 50 years. Dave and Lisa, meanwhile, are still trying to figure out if they should live together, and where. Although Joe tinkers with the reactor, his repairs (hitting it numerous times with a pair of pliers and then pulling out a circuit board) fail to produce the desired effect, and he announces that the whole station will blow up unless everyone (save for two people) goes into suspended animation pods for 50 years so they can shut the station down and wait for help. The crew, with the exception of Bill (who is paranoid that someone else will wind up making just as much money when he wakes up) and Matthew (who tells his android girlfriend to take his place—even though, as she tries to point out, she doesn't need oxygen or food to survive) get into the pods. Matthew trips over a cord, unplugging the pods from their power source, instantly killing everyone except for himself and Bill. Bill then informs Matthew that they'll have to re-start the human race together. (Matthew agrees--"But no gay stuff.") Guest stars Bobbie Brown as Irene.
53	25	"Injury"	Rich Beren	Paul Simms	June 5, 1997	203	14.47
When uninsured Matthew is injured goofing off at work, Dave and Lisa try to pass it off as a workplace accident so that workers' compensation will pay for the hospital costs. Bill objects to a fellow newscaster's use of the word "penis" on the air by giving a series of on-air editorials in which he uses the word a number of times himself. Guest stars Bob Odenkirk as Dr. Smith. Norm Macdonald returns as Roger, Mr. James' lawyer. This episode was intended to appear in season 2. It was delayed because the script called for Bill (Phil Hartman) to repeatedly use the word "penis" (some of which were ultimately edited out). Because of this, the episode is intentionally featured on both the first (Seasons 1 & 2) and second (Season 3) NewsRadio DVD releases.

=== Season 4 (1997–98) ===
No. overall	No. in season	Title	Directed by	Written by	Original release date	Prod. code	Viewers (millions)
54	1	"Jumper"	Tom Cherones	Paul Simms	September 23, 1997	401	16.69
Bill tries to save a suicidal man standing on the ledge outside of Dave's office. Guest stars Jon Lovitz as Mike Johnson, and Ivan Allen as Newsman. This is the second appearance of Jon Lovitz on NewsRadio. He played the part of a mental patient in season three's Our Fiftieth Episode.
55	2	"Planbee"	Tom Cherones	Brian Kelley	September 30, 1997	402	12.94
Mr. James brings in Andrea, an efficiency expert, to bring some order to WNYX. The staff tries to protect Matthew from being fired. Bill auditions for a television news anchor job. Guest stars Scott Valentine as Producer, Charlotte Booker as Makeup Artist, John Vosler as Painter. Recurring characters Lauren Graham as Andrea, and Michael Kostroff as Carl.
56	3	"The Public Domain"	Tom Cherones	Joe Furey	October 28, 1997	404	14.75
Andrea tries to replace Dave with a bland, laconic executive named Steve. Bill decides to embark on a Mark Russell-style piano act, performing satirical songs about politics and angering Dave in the process. Mr. James brings a documentary crew to the station. Matthew continues to lobby Dave for his old job. Guest stars Paul Gleason as Steve Johnson, Peter Spellos as Camera Guy, and Cheryl Kirby as Passenger. Lauren Graham returns as Andrea. As noted in this episode's DVD commentary, this episode is entitled "The Public Domain" because the songs Bill played on the piano were all in the public domain: When Johnny Comes Marching Home Again; Twinkle, Twinkle, Little Star; Row, Row, Row Your Boat; etc.
57	4	"Super Karate Monkey Death Car"	Tom Cherones	Josh Lieb	November 4, 1997	403	13.12
Mr. James hosts a bookstore reading of his newly-republished autobiography, which he had translated back into English because it was a bestseller in Japan; but he finds that Jimmy James: Capitalist Lion Tamer is now titled Jimmy James: Macho Business Donkey Wrestler and is full of bizarre turns of phrase. Andrea subjects the staff to polygraph tests, which leads to Lisa revealing her extensive criminal record. Guest stars Dave Allen as Lackey, Mark Conley as Pilot, Zuhair Haddad as Maitre d', Brian Posehn as Fan, Ron Jeremy as Fan, and Michael Raysses as Technician. Lauren Graham returns as Andrea.
58	5	"French Diplomacy"	Tom Cherones	Drake Sather	November 11, 1997	405	13.22
Bill's editorials become more than Lisa can handle. Dave breaks up with Lisa because he thinks the relationship will hurt them at work. Andrea, who is hurt that she didn't know about the relationship, helps Lisa get revenge by making her the boss and making Dave Bill's producer. Guest stars Nancy Bell as Brandi, and Edith Barnes as Mrs. Barnes. Lauren Graham returns as Andrea.
59	6	"Pure Evil"	Tom Cherones	Story by : Brian Kelley & Lewis Morton; Teleplay by : Paul Simms	November 18, 1997	407	12.02
Dave plots against Lisa to get his job back by goading Bill to do fake interviews of President Clinton on the air. Matthew starts sleeping in Lisa's office. Guest stars George Dobesh as Senator, and Grace Morley as Cindy.
60	7	"Catherine Moves On"	Tom Cherones	Josh Lieb & Paul Simms	November 25, 1997	408	12.87
Catherine announces she is leaving WNYX. The rest of the staff offer Mr. James their versions of how Catherine quit and why, colored by their own perceptions. Joe makes one last attempt to get with Catherine.
61	8	"Stupid Holiday Charity Talent Show"	Tom Cherones	Alan J. Higgins	December 16, 1997	409	13.33
Mr. James offers to give Matthew his job back if WNYX wins the New York Holiday Charity Talent Show, so that he can win a bet with Ted Turner. Dave reveals a new talent - knife-throwing. Bill plays piano for Beth while she sings "Makin' Whoopee", and attempts to coach her in her singing. Ultimately, Matthew takes the stage as a ventriloquist, and his pathetic act wins him the contest on a sympathy vote, getting him his job back. Guest stars Kevin McDonald as Throwdini, and Tom Parks as Emcee.
62	9	"The Secret of Management"	Tom Cherones	Lewis Morton	January 1, 1998	406	15.25
Bill hires a butler. Lisa asks Mr. James to teach her "The Secret of Management". Matthew is depressed. Guest stars Ian Abercrombie as Cadbury, and Mary Lynn Rajskub as Waitress.
63	10	"Look Who's Talking"	Tom Cherones	Joe Furey	January 6, 1998	412	12.29
Bill decides that he wants to adopt a child. Lisa grows jealous because Bill has a natural rapport with children which she lacks, but Dave comes to think Bill will be a great father. Mr James takes part in a bachelor auction for charity, and rents a duchess title for Beth so that she can bid on him. Joe accompanies her, acting as her homosexual limo driver. Guest stars Denise Dowse as Adoption Agent, Judy Geeson as Auctioneer, Lynn A. Henderson as Mother #1, Clarinda Ross as Mother #2, Patricia Place as Rich Woman, Logan Craig O'Brien as Charlie, Jim Hanna as Husband, Kate Gladfelter as Wife, and Reed Rudy as Rich Guy.
64	11	"Chock"	Tom Cherones	Sam Johnson & Chris Marcil	January 13, 1998	410	13.54
It is Dave's 32nd birthday, and the other members of his college a cappella group show up at WNYX to reform the group. Guest stars Bob Odenkirk as Bob, David Cross as David, and Brian Posehn as Brian.
65	12	"Who's the Boss: Part 1"	Gregg Heschong	Josh Lieb	January 20, 1998	411	12.62
Lisa is tired of being the boss and Dave doesn't want the job. They decide to "punish" Bill by making him the boss in order to teach him a lesson after his insubordinate behavior. Most of the office comes to believe Bill is a great boss after he gives pointless tasks to Matthew and Beth.
66	13	"Who's the Boss: Part 2"	Tom Cherones	Brian Kelley	February 3, 1998	413	12.09
Mr. James decides to let the staff vote between Dave and Lisa to determine who will be the boss, though they are both open about not wanting the job throughout the entire election. Matthew runs for floor fire marshal. Joe's brothers show up and create mayhem. Guest stars Bryan Callen as Russ Garreli, Nick DiPaolo as Jack Garreli, and Robert Hegyes as Sal Garreli. Michael Kostroff returns as Carl.
67	14	"Security Door"	Tom Cherones	Story by : Joe Furey & Lewis Morton; Teleplay by : Sam Johnson & Chris Marcil	February 24, 1998	415	12.10
Dave has a security door installed at the station. Everyone immediately circumvents the door. Bill tries out for a commercial.
68	15	"Big Brother"	Judi Elterman	Lewis Morton	March 3, 1998	414	10.54
Matthew gets involved in a mix-up at the Big Brother program. Bill tries to get Dave jealous by telling him that Lisa is dating somebody else. Guest stars Michael Buchman Silver as Danny, and Mike Colt as Guard.
69	16	"Beep, Beep"	Tom Cherones	Alan J. Higgins	March 18, 1998	416	8.18
Mr. James gives Matthew a small battery-powered car for his birthday, and tries to get Dave and Lisa back together so that they can be more productive. Guest stars Antoinette Valente as Mary.
70	17	"Balloon"	Tom Cherones	Story by : Joe Furey & Paul Simms; Teleplay by : Josh Lieb	March 25, 1998	417	8.09
Mr. James decides that he needs to fly around the world in a hot air balloon in order to prove his machismo to the other billionaires. Guest stars Dave Nemeth as TV Anchor.
71	18	"Copy Machine"	Joe Furey	Drake Sather	April 8, 1998	418	7.65
Ted from accounting is killed by the copy machine and Joe feels responsible. Dave has trouble dealing with his grief over the death even though he didn't know Ted, and Ted's former college roommate comes to the office to talk to the staff about their memories of Ted, in preparation for his eulogy. Guest stars Tom Gallop as Jack, and Christopher Randolph as Paramedic.
72	19	"Monster Rancher"	Tom Cherones	Story by : Brian Kelley & Lewis Morton; Teleplay by : Sam Johnson & Chris Marcil	April 15, 1998	419	7.24
Mr. James makes Dave hire his nephew Walt (Brad Rowe). Dave resents it at first, but Walt is genuinely interested in radio, and has been obsessed with Dave's radio career since seeing him speak in junior high. Dave is touched and begins to give advice to Walt, which soon backfires when Walt reveals his crush on Lisa. Bill feels threatened by Walt's youth and good looks. Matthew asks Lisa out on a date, and she has trouble not hurting his feelings. Joe Rogan does not appear.
73	20	"4:20"	Judi Elterman	Paul Simms	April 29, 1998	420	7.15
Mr. James invites the WNYX staff to a smoker at his men's club, where Matthew and Joe will participate in a no holds barred Ultimate Fight. Walt's crush on Lisa bothers Bill more than it does Dave. Guest stars David Dunard as Referee, and Brad Rowe returns as Walt.
74	21	"Jackass Junior High"	Tom Cherones	Story by : Drake Sather & Paul Simms; Teleplay by : Joe Furey & Alan J. Higgins	May 6, 1998	421	6.63
Beth is on vacation and Lisa is the only woman working in the station. The guys see this as a license to be vulgar, because they think of Lisa as "one of the guys". Bill becomes worried the people don't think he is funny. Mr. James discovers a tax loophole and turns the station into a historic landmark, as long as they host six tours a day. Guest stars Mark Jonathan Davis as himself, Jonelle Kennedy as Cheryl, Michelle Benes as Tour Woman, Doug Gochman as Tourist #1, Allan Murray as Tourist #2, Grady Hutt as Teenager, and Mathew Weiss as Kid. Brad Rowe returns as Walt. Vicki Lewis is not in this episode; she was away working on Pushing Tin.
75	22	"Sinking Ship"	Tom Cherones	Story by : Chris Marcil, Lew Morton, Drake Sather, & Paul Simms; Teleplay by : Joe Furey, Brian Kelley, Josh Lieb, & Sam Johnson	May 12, 1998	422	8.63
Another "what if" episode that places Newsradio on the Titanic. Guest stars Emil Alexander as Porter, and Brad Rowe returns as Walt. Vicki Lewis does not appear in this episode, and she is not included in the specially-created opening credits. Her absence was noted at the end of the show, when the audience is told that she was in Toronto working on Pushing Tin. She does, however, appear on the DVD commentary. Hartman himself hosts this episode, book-ending the story. The episode marks his final appearance in the series (He would die later that month).

=== Season 5 (1998–99) ===
No. overall	No. in season	Title	Directed by	Written by	Original release date	Prod. code	Viewers (millions)
76	1	"Bill Moves On"	Tom Cherones	Paul Simms	September 23, 1998	501	13.25
The staff members mourn Bill's death. Guest stars Khandi Alexander as Catherine Duke. The cast could barely get through reading the script due to the death of Phil Hartman. They broke down in tears several times while filming the episode. This aired the day before what would have been Hartman's 50th birthday.
77	2	"Meet the Max Louis"	Tom Cherones	Josh Lieb	October 7, 1998	502	10.29
Dave hires Max Louis (Jon Lovitz) as Bill's replacement.
78	3	"Lucky Burger"	Tom Cherones	Alan J. Higgins	October 14, 1998	503	9.71
Matthew is determined to prove Max a fraud, while Lisa takes a job at a fast food restaurant to ferret out corruption. Guest stars David Anthony Higgins as The Manager.
79	4	"Noise"	Tom Cherones	Sam Johnson & Chris Marcil	October 21, 1998	504	8.78
Dave and Jimmy become addicted to Joe's white noise box. Matthew comes to terms with Max, while Lisa feuds with him over "This Day in History."
80	5	"Flowers for Matthew"	Tom Cherones	Mark O'Keefe & Ron Weiner	October 28, 1998	505	9.82
Joe's smart drink actually makes Matthew smart, but it can't last forever. Beth and Max may have feelings for one another, but Max throws Lisa into the mix.
81	6	"Jail"	Tom Cherones	Tom Saunders & Kell Cahoon	November 4, 1998	506	10.74
Jimmy is arrested as infamous hijacker D. B. Cooper. Johnny Johnson temporarily replaces Jimmy, but looks to make it permanent. Guest stars Langdon Bensing as FBI Agent, David Basulto as Guard #1, Jeff Greenwald as Security Guard, and Aaron Knight as Guard #1. Patrick Warburton joins as Johnny Johnson.
82	7	"The Lam"	Tom Cherones	Sam Johnson & Chris Marcil	November 11, 1998	507	10.39
Fugitive Jimmy hides out with Dave's parents. Johnny offers to stop being evil if Lisa will marry him. Guest stars Spencer Garrett as G-Man, and Patrick Warburton returns as Johnny Johnson.
83	8	"Clash of the Titans"	Tom Cherones	Josh Lieb	November 24, 1998	508	9.77
Jimmy is cleared of all charges when Adam West confesses to the crime, but now has to fight to get his company back from Johnny. Guest stars Casey Sander as Prosecutor, Julius Tennon as Judge, and Adam West as himself. Patrick Warburton returns as Johnny Johnson.
84	9	"Boston"	Tom Cherones	Alan J. Higgins	December 9, 1998	509	8.55
Max accidentally restores Lisa's Boston accent; Dave records an inspirational message for his high school.
85	10	"Spooky Rapping Crypt"	Tom Cherones	Mark O'Keefe	December 15, 1998	510	9.97
Beth causes Jimmy's ire when she demands a profit sharing plan; Matthew discovers Lisa's Satanic cult through recovered memory therapy.
86	11	"Stinkbutt"	Tom Cherones	Drake Sather	January 5, 1999	511	11.26
Joe and Beth paint a mural; Lisa and Matthew wear the same outfit; Max fights with Jimmy's new security consultant. Guest stars Toby Huss as Jack Frost.
87	12	"Apartment"	Skip Collector	Story by : Sam Johnson & Chris Marcil; Teleplay by : Tom Saunders & Kell Cahoon	January 12, 1999	512	10.88
Dave and Lisa fight over a new apartment. Joe puts up a webcam.
88	13	"Towers"	Judi Elterman	Story by : Cliff Schoenberg; Teleplay by : Alan J. Higgins	February 2, 1999	513	9.54
Jimmy plans to build gigantic J-shaped twin towers; Matthew transforms into a 70's punk to avoid dealing with his 30th birthday.
89	14	"Hair"	Tom Cherones	Josh Lieb	February 9, 1999	514	8.75
Joe hypnotizes Jimmy to cure his fear of hippies; Beth and Max are spoiling Lisa's new puppy.
90	15	"Assistant"	Tom Cherones	Ron Weiner	February 16, 1999	515	10.03
Joe is smitten over Lisa's new assistant; Jimmy redecorates the men's room and Beth fights for access to it. Guest stars Tiffani-Amber Thiessen as Foxy Jackson.
91	16	"Wino"	Tom Cherones	Sam Johnson & Chris Marcil	February 23, 1999	516	10.15
Johnny Johnson (guest star Patrick Warburton) returns--claiming to be no longer evil, but now as a wino--to ask for Lisa's hand in marriage. Guest stars Alan Frazier as Bum.
92	17	"Wedding"	Tom Cherones	Tom Saunders & Kell Cahoon	March 2, 1999	517	10.01
Dave tries to prevent Lisa from marrying Johnny. Guest stars Paul F. Tompkins as Justice of the Peace, and Jeb Barrows as man in Black. Returning guest stars Alan Frazier as Bum and Patrick Warburton returns as Johnny Johnson.
93	18	"Ploy"	Tom Cherones	Mark O'Keefe	March 9, 1999	518	9.97
Lisa hyphenates her last name; Max announces he's going to quit. But what are his intentions?
94	19	"Padded Suit"	Dave Foley	Story by : Mike Preister; Teleplay by : Ron Weiner	April 13, 1999	519	7.96
Matthew and Max learn Joe's self-invented martial art of "Joe-Jitsu", with the help of a padded suit. Meanwhile, Dave plans to fire someone, while Jimmy starts a crusade against Mother's Day.
95	20	"Freaky Friday"	Skip Collector	Story by : Brad Copeland; Teleplay by : Josh Lieb	April 20, 1999	520	8.32
Jimmy and Matthew switch places for a day; Beth is caught cheating a CD club; Max is banned from the break room. Guest stars Wayne Federman as Randy Stark.
96	21	"Retirement"	Judi Elterman	Story by : Paul Simms; Teleplay by : Joe Furey & Brian Kelley	April 27, 1999	521	8.02
Jimmy announces he's selling the station to retire to New Hampshire.
97	22	"New Hampshire"	Tom Cherones	Story by : Josh Lieb & Paul Simms; Teleplay by : Sam Johnson & Chris Marcil	May 4, 1999	522	8.58
Jimmy sells the station and retires to New Hampshire, and tries to take the WNYX staff with him.
