= Love and Support =

- Official "Love and Support" Poster
- Directed by: Joe Furey
- Starring: Joe Furey; Pat Finn; Kristin Dattilo
- Release date: 2001

Love and Support is a 2001 film by Joe Furey, starring Joe Furey, Pat Finn, Kristin Dattilo, Jenna Byrne, and Wayne Federman.

Joe Furey was a writer for NewsRadio, Watching Ellie, and David Letterman. Special features on the DVD include interviews with Dave Foley, Maura Tierney, Julia Louis-Dreyfus and Edie Falco. It has been released earlier as part of a film festival on DVD, without the special features.
