= Jeff Greenwald =

American author, photographer and monologist

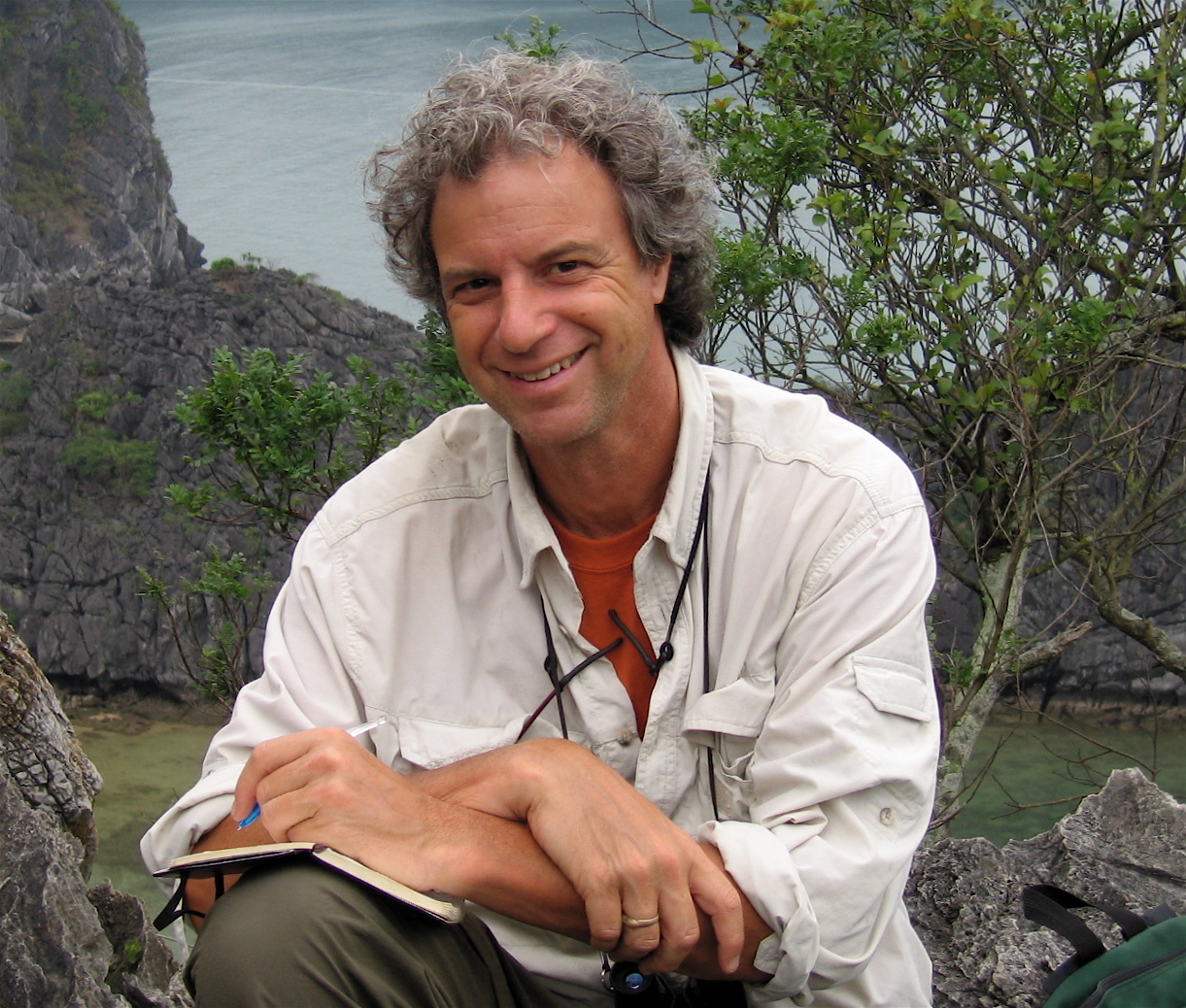
- Born: March 6, 1954 (age 72); Bronx, New York
- Occupations: Author, photographer, monologist
- Years active: 1979–present
- Website: jeffgreenwald.com

Jeff Greenwald (born March 6, 1954) is an American author, photographer, and monologist. He now resides in Oakland, California.

== Biography ==
On Greenwald's first trip to Asia in 1979, he designed urban playgrounds for UNICEF and the Nepal Children's Organization. Arriving several months later in Thailand during the Khmer civil war, he served as a volunteer water engineer at Khao-I-Dang—-the largest of the Cambodian refugee camps. These early travel experiences shaped his career and philosophy about travel. In the Spring of 1983, Greenwald was awarded a journalism fellowship by the Rotary International Foundation, and departed for a second trip to Asia. Over the course of 16 months he lived in Kathmandu, Nepal, and made excursions to the Himalaya, India, Sri Lanka, Hong Kong, Japan, Java, and Bali. His articles about those trips appeared in the magazines GEO and Islands. It was around this time that he began writing Mr. Raja’s Neighborhood: Letters from Nepal. Four years later, his travels in Nepal and Tibet would inspire Shopping for Buddhas, first published by Harper and Row in 1990. A later edition, published in the Lonely Planet "Journeys" series, won the Lowell Thomas Gold Award for Best Travel Book of 1996. A 25th Anniversary edition, which includes Nepal's political upheavals since 1995, was added.

As he circled the globe writing The Size of the World in 1993-1994, Greenwald posted a series of real-time dispatches to GNN, the Global Network Navigator, describing his journey. The first was posted on January 6, 1994, from Oaxaca, Mexico. Nineteen more followed. Consequently, Greenwald is hailed as an internet pioneer for creating the first international travel "blog" (five years. before the term was coined) on the World Wide Web. In 2003, Greenwald co-founded the organization Ethical Traveler, of which he serves as the Executive Director. A project of the Earth Island Institute, Ethical Traveler is a global community dedicated to exploring the ambassadorial potential of world travel, as outlined in Greenwald's "Thirteen Tips for the Accidental Ambassador."

Using his many travel adventures as material, Greenwald developed a one-man show in 2003 called "Strange Travel Suggestions." The show, which premiered at The Marsh in San Francisco to critical acclaim, is an improvised monologue. Each performance's stories and arc is determined by an audience volunteer's spin of an on-stage "wheel of fortune". A more recent show, "108 Beloved Objects," based on Greenwald's 2021 book of the same name, premiered in San Leandro in September 2022 as part of Brian Copeland's "Best of SF Solo" performance series.

Thanks to a casting director who was a fan of his writing, Greenwald made a cameo appearance as Security Guard on the "Jail" episode of the NBC sitcom NewsRadio.

In 2021, Greenwald was diagnosed with Parkinson's Disease. In May 2024—hearkening back to his groundbreaking travel "blogs" of 1994—he began a series of Substack posts ("Jeffji's Big World") relating his adventures in everyday life—from a cruise along the Maine coast to Burning Man—to his "journey" with Parkinson's.

== Bibliography ==
- Mr. Raja's Neighborhood: Letters from Nepal (1986, John Daniel Publications)
- Shopping for Buddhas (1990, Harper & Row; 1996, Lonely Planet; 2014, Travelers' Tales)
- The Size of the World (1996, Globe Pequot; March 1997, Ballantine Books)
- Future Perfect: How Star Trek Conquered Planet Earth (1998, Viking; 1999, Penguin; 2016, Kindle)
- Scratching the Surface: Impressions of Planet Earth from Hollywood to Shiraz (2002, Naga Press)
- Snake Lake (2010, Counterpoint Press)
- Out of Nothing: Conversations with Larry Harvey (2019, Black Rock Philosophical Center)
- The Nine Gifts: A First Aid Kit for Mind, Body and Spirit (2020, with Christine Marie Mason)
- 108 Beloved Objects: Letting Go of Stuff, Keeping Our Stories (2021, self-published)
- Greenwald has written stories and essays for such publications as The New York Times Magazine, Wired, National Geographic Adventure, Outside, New Scientist, and Craftsmanship. His travel writing appears in numerous anthologies, such as The Kindness of Strangers, In Search of Adventure, Salon Wanderlust, and in many volumes of the award-winning Travelers Tales series.

== Quotes ==
- "For anyone with an appetite for fantastic legends, a thirst for color (especially red), and a general craving for utter theological wonder, Nepal is a case study in all-you-can-eat."
- "We go where we need to go, then try to figure out what we're doing there."
- "Every time I set off on a journey, I feel like God has thrown me the keys to her car."
