= List of Becker episodes =

Becker is an American situation comedy television series created by Dave Hackel that aired on CBS for six seasons from November 2, 1998 to January 28, 2004. A total of 129 episodes were produced. The number of every episode appears as the change readout on the register at Reggie's diner.

== Series overview ==
Season	Episodes	Originally released	
Season	Episodes	First released	Last released
1	22	November 2, 1998	May 17, 1999
2	24	September 20, 1999	May 22, 2000
3	24	October 9, 2000	May 14, 2001
4	24	October 1, 2001	May 20, 2002
5	22	October 6, 2002	April 20, 2003
6	13	October 8, 2003	January 28, 2004

== Episodes ==
=== Season 1 (1998–99) ===
No. overall	No. in season	Title	Directed by	Written by	Original release date	Prod. code	Viewers (millions)
1	1	"Pilot"	Andy Ackerman	Dave Hackel	November 2, 1998	40215–001	13.77
Becker deals with an HIV-positive child, and the fact that Reggie has inherited his favorite diner from her father.
2	2	"Take These Pills and Shove 'Em"	Andy Ackerman	Marsha Myers	November 9, 1998	40215–004	14.00
Becker must convince a skeptical patient, Mr. Marino, that his diabetes has triggered a minor heart attack and that he needs treatment. Meanwhile, Jake takes a sculpting class in order to meet women.
3	3	"Sex in the Inner City"	Andy Ackerman	David Isaacs & Sue Herring	November 16, 1998	40215–003	14.00
Despite his best efforts, Becker cannot escape the sexual overtones that follow him throughout the day. As his day progresses, a bemused Becker is faced with various circumstances that make him all too aware of his sex life – or, rather, lack thereof.
4	4	"Tell Me Lies"	Andy Ackerman	Russ Woody	November 30, 1998	40215–002	13.03
Becker and Jake notice that Reggie is upset about something, but she refuses to tell them why. Becker presses Reggie for details, but she responds with a series of lies before finally revealing the truth. Note: This episode marks the last television appearance of actor Noam Pitlik.
5	5	"My Dinner with Becker"	Lee Shallat-Chemel	Teresa O'Neill	December 7, 1998	40215–006	14.41
When a patient tries to set Becker up on a blind date, he initially declines the offer, but he eventually agrees to meet the woman. Meanwhile, Reggie's evening goes south when she realizes that the guy she is dating is just too nice.
6	6	"Man Plans, God Laughs"	Andy Ackerman	Ian Gurvitz	December 14, 1998	40215–005	13.90
Becker's attempt at friendship is short lived. With Margaret at home with the flu, the flaky Linda is left in charge of the office. Reggie receives an unwelcome visit from a former high-school classmate.
7	7	"City Lights"	Andy Ackerman	Russ Woody	December 21, 1998	40215–008	12.52
Becker is crabbier than ever when a flickering street light keeps him from getting any sleep. When the city refuses to make the broken street light a priority assignment, Becker takes matters into his own hands.
8	8	"Physician, Heal Thyself"	Lee Shallat-Chemel	Ian Gurvitz	January 11, 1999	40215–009	14.89
The arrogant Bronx doctor is once again complaining about the shortcomings of society, sparking another verbal sparring match with Reggie. But when his back goes out, he has no choice but to call her for help.
9	9	"Choose Me"	Andy Ackerman	Marsha Myers	January 18, 1999	40215–010	15.73
When Reggie announces that she has an extra ticket to a Rangers-Flyers hockey game, Jake and Becker each makes it his primary goal to be chosen as the lucky recipient.
10	10	"P.C. World"	Jeff Melman	Michael Markowitz	January 25, 1999	40215–013	14.68
When a self-serving reporter witnesses a heated argument between Becker and a man at the diner, he determines that Becker's comments are "politically incorrect" and uses his newspaper column to create a local controversy. Becker tries his best to ignore the situation but has a hard time letting it go and decides to confront the reporter and expose his hypocrisy.
11	11	"Scriptus Interruptus"	Andy Ackerman	Ian Gurvitz	February 1, 1999	40215–014	15.16
Becker agrees to write an article for a fellow doctor's medical journal, but has trouble finishing the project when he cannot seem to acquire five minutes of quiet time before something or someone finds a way to interrupt his concentration.
12	12	"Love! Lies! Bleeding!"	Andy Ackerman	Michael Markowitz	February 8, 1999	40215–007	12.63
Becker deals with a series of Valentine's Day issues with his usual cynical approach, but a late night hospital visit abruptly softens his perspective as he begins to understand why this holiday can be so important to others.
13	13	"Becker the Elder"	Andy Ackerman	Dave Hackel	February 15, 1999	40215–011	14.92
Becker is less than thrilled when his estranged father, Fred (Dick Van Dyke), makes an unannounced visit. Although Becker is unhappy to see his father, the others are instantly charmed by Fred's easygoing personality.
14	14	"Larry Spoke"	Andy Ackerman	Russ Woody	February 22, 1999	40215–015	13.31
Becker copes with a patient who believes he can talk directly to God. Meanwhile, Linda decides to keep a jacket mistakenly returned to her by her drycleaner.
15	15	"Activate Your Choices"	Andy Ackerman	David Isaacs	March 1, 1999	40215–012	13.40
When Becker learns that his ex-wife Sandra is in town for a book signing tour, he feigns disinterest until he learns that chapters of her new self-help publication denounces "Angry Man," a pseudonym for Becker. When Becker confronts Sandra at her hotel, it becomes abundantly clear that their explosive chemistry remains fiercely intact.
16	16	"Limits and Boundaries"	Lee Shallat-Chemel	Dave Hackel	March 8, 1999	40215–016	14.30
When a patient's mother desperately needs Becker to watch her two kids for the day, he reluctantly agrees. But when the day turns into an unexpected sleepover at Becker's, his attempts to establish rules for the kids are ineffective.
17	17	"Partial Law"	Ken Levine	Michael Markowitz	April 5, 1999	40215–017	13.84
When Becker's computer is stolen from his apartment, he is shocked to learn that the insurance company's reimbursement will not even cover the cost of a keyboard. Against his better judgment, he purchases a top-of-the-line system via shady means and soon realizes he has made a "fatal error."
18	18	"Saving Harvey Cohen"	Andy Ackerman	Eric Cohen	April 12, 1999	40215–019	14.12
Much to Becker's dismay, an alley cat finds its way into his office and refuses to leave. When they realize that the cat is sick, Becker is guilted into taking care of it.
19	19	"Truth and Consequences"	Leonard R. Garner Jr.	Marsha Myers	April 19, 1999	40215–020	13.11
Becker's cousin Barry invites him over to his house for dinner, and Becker learns first-hand that Barry and his wife are having major marital problems. However, Becker makes the situation worse by letting it slip that Barry once had an affair, which puts Becker in an awkward position.
20	20	"Drive, They Said"	Andy Ackerman	Ken Levine & David Isaacs	May 3, 1999	40215–021	13.31
Becker reluctantly agrees to shuttle Reggie, Margaret, Jake and Linda to various engagements in Queens when they learn that he is heading that way in his car. It quickly becomes a "what-was-I-thinking" scenario for the gang when Becker's road-rage behind the wheel causes an accident. The original broadcast of this episode included cameos by Hilton Lucas from Cosby, Doug Heffernan from The King of Queens and Ray Barone from Everybody Loves Raymond. These cameos were cut from the syndicated and DVD versions.
21	21	"Lucky Day"	Andy Ackerman	Earl Pomerantz	May 10, 1999	40215–018	13.86
A prime parking space, an unexpected tax refund and a flawless trip to the post office are just a few of the lucky breaks bestowed upon Becker. Unable to accept the idea that he might just be having a good day, he remains wary of each new stroke of luck and convinces himself that payback is on its way.
22	22	"Regarding Reggie"	Andy Ackerman	Russ Woody	May 17, 1999	40215–022	13.44
Becker tries to find a date for a medical fundraiser while everyone insists that he should just ask Reggie. Fearing that Reggie will misread his invitation, Becker struggles to find someone else to take to the event.

=== Season 2 (1999–2000) ===
No. overall	No. in season	Title	Directed by	Written by	Original release date	Prod. code	Viewers (millions)
23	1	"Point of Contact"	Andy Ackerman	Michael Markowitz	September 20, 1999	40215–023	15.16
After saving a woman's life in the diner (Kim Darby), Becker believes that she has become his stalker.
24	2	"Imm-Oral Fixations"	Andy Ackerman	Ian Gurvitz	September 27, 1999	40215–024	16.22
After quitting smoking, Becker picks up another addiction (sex).
25	3	"Cyrano de Beckerac"	Ken Levine	Marsha Myers	October 4, 1999	40215–025	14.12
When Becker learns his patient is dating Reggie, he lends him some dating advice. Meanwhile, Linda tries to mentor a child with behavioral issues.
26	4	"Linda Quits"	Ken Levine	Glenn Gers	October 11, 1999	40215–026	15.39
Linda decides to quit her job at Becker's office. Meanwhile, the rest of the gang are trying to figure out what a man in front of Reggie's diner is waiting for.
27	5	"My Boyfriend's Back"	Andy Ackerman	Dana Borkow	October 18, 1999	40215–027	14.05
As Reggie dates her high school crush, Becker becomes upset when he learns of an old friend's recent success.
28	6	"Shovel Off to Buffalo"	Andy Ackerman	David Isaacs	October 25, 1999	40215–028	16.35
Becker and Reggie are stranded in Buffalo when their flight to Chicago is delayed due to bad weather.
29	7	"He Said, She Said"	Andy Ackerman	April Kelly	November 1, 1999	40215–029	14.70
Becker is visited by a friend of an old friend who turns out to be the old friend. Meanwhile Margaret is upset with an acquaintance over an old debt.
30	8	"Stumble in the Bronx"	Andy Ackerman	Matthew Weiner	November 8, 1999	40215–030	14.98
Becker is shot in the shoulder while trying to help Jake, who got robbed at gunpoint. He meets his surgeon, Elizabeth (Frances Fisher), with whom he frequently clashes.
31	9	"Hate Thy Neighbor"	Andy Ackerman	Anne Flett-Giordano & Chuck Ranberg	November 15, 1999	40215–031	15.22
While recovering from the shooting, Becker must put up with his neighbors. Elizabeth also returns, starting a relationship with Becker. Meanwhile, Margaret and Linda must find a temporary doctor while Becker is out.
32	10	"Pain in the Aspirin"	Gregg Heschong	Russ Woody	November 22, 1999	40215–032	15.61
Elizabeth claims that she doesn't have any aspirin, but Becker finds a bottle of them while earlier snooping through her purse. Becker obsesses about her "lie" while ignoring his. Bob wins the lottery.
33	11	"Blind Curve"	Andy Ackerman	Matthew Weiner	November 29, 1999	40215–033	15.90
Jake's former best friend and person that caused his blindness returns to town wanting Jake's forgiveness.
34	12	"Santa on Ice"	Andy Ackerman	Marsha Myers	December 13, 1999	40215–034	16.81
Becker ends up spending Christmas Eve in the morgue while he tries to identify a man who died while in his office. Meanwhile, Reggie gets ready for her Christmas party.
35	13	"The Hypocratic Oath"	Andy Ackerman	Ian Gurvitz	January 10, 2000	40215–035	17.90
When Margaret takes time off from work, Becker and Linda have to deal with a bad day at the office without her.
36	14	"The Rumor"	Andy Ackerman	Earl Pomerantz	January 17, 2000	40215–036	16.34
A rumor is started that Becker is suffering from a terminal illness.
37	15	"All the Rage"	Lee Shallat-Chemel	Michael Markowitz	February 7, 2000	40215–037	13.84
Becker must undergo anger management classes after he verbally assaults two police officers. Meanwhile, Bob's mother kicks him out of the retirement home.
38	16	"Old Yeller"	Darryl Bates	Mark Egan	February 14, 2000	40215–038	15.31
Everyone believes Becker is going through a mid-life crisis after he buys a motorcycle.
39	17	"The Roast That Ruined Them"	Andy Ackerman	Dana Borkow	February 21, 2000	40215–039	15.57
Becker's girlfriend pressures him into hosting a dinner party.
40	18	"For Whom the Toll Calls"	Andy Ackerman	Matthew Weiner	February 28, 2000	40215–040	10.40
After receiving a faulty charge on his telephone bill, Becker has to fight the phone company to take it off. Meanwhile, Bob produces a set of inspirational tapes.
41	19	"The Bearer of Bad Tidings"	Andy Ackerman	Marsha Myers	March 20, 2000	40215–041	17.00
Becker accidentally leaves a phone message for the child of a deceased patient while annoyed with Linda and her friend (also named Linda). Now, Becker tries desperately to delete it before the person listens to it, ultimately accidentally informing the wrong family that their father died.
42	20	"One Angry Man"	Andy Ackerman	Dan Wilcox	April 10, 2000	40215–042	14.50
Becker and Linda both receive jury duty.
43	21	"Sight Unseen"	Darryl Bates	Michael Markowitz	May 1, 2000	40215–043	16.76
Jake ponders breaking up with a woman when he learns she too is blind.
44	22	"Crosstalk"	Andy Ackerman	Ian Gurvitz	May 8, 2000	40215–044	15.34
Becker and a priest (John Mahoney) go head-to-head over religion. Meanwhile, Reggie, Jake and Bob venture into online investments. Also, Linda can't stop laughing after hearing about Asperger syndrome.
45	23	"Cooked"	Ken Levine	Russ Woody	May 15, 2000	40215–046	15.11
Becker's girlfriend gets a job offer in Chicago, which prompts John to tell her how he feels about her.
46	24	"Panic on the 86th"	Andy Ackerman	Ken Levine & David Isaacs	May 22, 2000	40215–045	16.05
Reggie suffers a panic attack when thinking about her future; Becker becomes friends with a prostitute.

=== Season 3 (2000–01) ===
No. overall	No. in season	Title	Directed by	Written by	Original release date	Prod. code	Viewers (millions)
47	1	"The Film Critic"	Andy Ackerman	Ian Gurvitz	October 9, 2000	40215–047	16.73
Becker attempts to see a movie, but it keeps getting interrupted by rude people in the theater.
48	2	"Super Bob"	Ken Levine	Dana Borkow	October 16, 2000	40215–048	17.58
After the building superintendent in Becker's building dies, Linda gets Bob to be his replacement.
49	3	"One Wong Move"	Andy Ackerman	Russ Woody	October 23, 2000	40215–051	17.00
Becker leaves his credit card at a Chinese restaurant that the others convinced him to go to.
50	4	"What Indifference a Day Makes"	Darryl Bates	Michael Markowitz	October 30, 2000	40215–050	16.72
Becker feels useless when a young student shadows him at work for a day.
51	5	"The Usual Suspects"	Ken Levine	Ken Levine	November 6, 2000	40215–054	17.31
After Becker's office is vandalized, he calls a detective to figure out who did it.
52	6	"The Wrong Man"	Andy Ackerman	Matthew Weiner	November 13, 2000	40215–052	17.81
Becker is visited by a now-married ex-girlfriend.
53	7	"Beckerethics"	Ken Levine	Marsha Myers	November 20, 2000	40215–049	17.98
Becker's car is stolen. A guy asks Reggie to marry him after two days.
54	8	"Smoke 'Em If You Got 'Em"	Andy Ackerman	Kate Angelo	November 27, 2000	40215–053	16.91
Becker bets Jake 50 dollars that he never smokes again, but Jake increases the bet to 100 dollars that Becker won't make it through the day without a cigarette. Becker's attempts to quit smoking are rocky at best, but the two raise the stakes to 300 dollars.
55	9	"Dr. Angry Head"	Andy Ackerman	Marsha Myers	December 11, 2000	40215–057	18.05
Becker's back goes out while standing near a department store Christmas display and he is unable to move.
56	10	"Margaret's Dream"	Gregg Heschong	Mark Egan	December 18, 2000	40215–055	17.58
Margaret has a sexual dream involving Becker, who plans to give Margaret a raise.
57	11	"Heart Breaker"	Joyce Gittlin	Mark Wilding	January 8, 2001	40215–056	17.09
Becker is anxious about dating a younger woman. Reggie gets death threats from a former classmate.
58	12	"The Trouble with Harry"	Wil Shriner	Anne Flett-Giordano & Chuck Ranberg	January 22, 2001	40215–058	17.09
One of Becker's patients dies and leaves his ashes to him.
59	13	"The Princess Cruise"	Ken Levine	Michael Markowitz	February 5, 2001	40215–061	18.37
Linda accidentally sends Becker on a gay cruise for vacation.
60	14	"Pretty Poison"	Andy Ackerman	Matthew Weiner	February 12, 2001	40215–063	15.55
When Becker's college sweetheart comes back into his life, he isn't prepared for the baggage she brings with her.
61	15	"2001½: A Graduation Odyssey"	Darryl Bates	Russ Woody	February 19, 2001	40215–062	15.66
Becker is excited to give a speech to a graduating high school class.
62	16	"Elder Hostile"	Andy Ackerman	Dana Borkow	February 26, 2001	40215–059	15.06
Becker treats Jake's grandmother, and earns the ire of both.
63	17	"The Ugly Truth"	Andy Ackerman	Matthew Weiner	March 5, 2001	40215–060	15.90
Jake's disability benefits get cut off after he receives a driver's license renewal form in the mail. Meanwhile, Reggie performs a psychology experiment on Becker and then becomes paranoid about Becker trying to get even.
64	18	"The More You Know"	Andy Ackerman	David Isaacs	March 19, 2001	40215–064	16.06
Linda and Reggie date the same man. Bob searches for the prostitute in the building.
65	19	"You Say Gay Son, I Say Godson"	Darryl Bates	Gary Dontzig & Steven Peterman	April 9, 2001	40215–067	15.75
Becker's godson confides in him that he needs help telling his dad he is gay.
66	20	"Nocturnal Omissions"	Wil Shriner	Ian Gurvitz	April 16, 2001	40215–065	14.43
Becker has insomnia and his friends try to help him get through it.
67	21	"The TorMentor"	Andy Ackerman	Kate Angelo	April 23, 2001	40215–066	15.34
Becker runs into an old college mentor/professor who doesn't remember him, much to Becker's chagrin.
68	22	"Small Wonder" (Part 1)	Andy Ackerman	Dana Borkow	April 30, 2001	40215–068	15.36
An obese patient of Becker's refuses to lose weight, so Becker takes him to a gym where he suffers a heart attack. Linda suspects that people think she's dumb because she has dyed her hair blonde.
69	23	"Sue You" (Part 2)	Andy Ackerman	Marsha Myers	May 7, 2001	40215–069	15.81
After being grateful to his doctor for saving his life at the gym, Becker's patient sues him on the advice of his hospital roommate, a lawyer who Becker insulted earlier. After being advised to settle, an incident in Central Park convinces him not to and he vows to fight it.
70	24	"Trials and Defibrillations" (Part 3)	Andy Ackerman	Russ Woody	May 14, 2001	40215–070	15.24
Becker's lawsuit goes to trial.

=== Season 4 (2001–02) ===
No. overall	No. in season	Title	Directed by	Written by	Original release date	Prod. code	Viewers (millions)
71	1	"Psycho Therapy"	Andy Ackerman	Matthew Weiner	October 1, 2001	40215–071	18.21
Becker is ordered by the court to see a psychologist (Rhea Perlman), though she turns out to be even angrier than he is. Linda searches for a new job.
72	2	"Breakfast of Chumpions"	Andy Ackerman	Russ Woody	October 8, 2001	40215–072	17.27
Becker buys a ticket for a pancake breakfast from a little girl. The breakfast becomes strained when Becker is forced to sit next to Doc Dome, a rival private practitioner with a dubious past.
73	3	"Jake's Jaunt"	Wil Shriner	Kate Angelo	October 15, 2001	40215–073	17.48
Everyone is shocked when Jake announces that he got married over the weekend to a woman he met at a friend's wedding. After realizing he may have rushed things, Jake gets an annulment.
74	4	"Dog Days"	Darryl Bates	Liz Astrof	October 22, 2001	40215–074	17.36
Becker helps a homeless man he discovered is a con artist when he learns the man is supposedly ill. Margaret is forced to act as nursemaid to a dog to earn extra money.
75	5	"Really Good Advice"	Ken Whittingham	Earl Pomerantz	October 29, 2001	40215–076	16.18
Becker takes Reggie's advice to be more sensitive with women. It helps at the office with Margaret, but backfires with a woman he is dating. Jake and Bob trade jobs.
76	6	"Get Me Out of Here"	Wil Shriner	Ken Levine & David Isaacs	November 5, 2001	40215–075	17.00
Becker panics when he has to get an MRI, finally resorting to Valium to get through the claustrophobic test. Linda tries to date twins, but breaks up with them when they ask her to choose between them.
77	7	"Hanging with Jake"	Chris Brougham	David Chambers & Julie Chambers	November 12, 2001	40215–077	17.47
Becker is faced with telling a patient that he cannot possibly be the father of his wife's baby. Reggie, Bob, and Jake try to convince a suicidal man (Dave Foley) that life is worth living.
78	8	"Dinner and a Showdown"	Gail Mancuso	Marsha Myers	November 19, 2001	40215–079	17.86
Becker and Reggie "double date" with Sara and her husband.
79	9	"The Buddy System"	Gregg Heschong	Ian Gurvitz	November 26, 2001	40215–080	19.92
Becker tries to keep a casual love affair alive, while Bob tries to turn a Super Bowl ring he found into his ticket to fame and fortune.
80	10	"The Ghost of Christmas Presents"	Ken Levine	Matthew Weiner	December 10, 2001	40215–081	16.12
Becker believes that Christmas is a phony time of the year. Instead of embracing the Christmas spirit, he uses getting robbed as vindication for his position.
81	11	"Another Tricky Day"	Ken Levine	Michael Markowitz	January 7, 2002	40215–078	18.03
Becker tells a patient that he is not dying and is surprised by his reaction.
82	12	"The Ex-Files"	Wil Shriner	Kate Angelo	January 14, 2002	40215–082	17.65
Reggie dates Becker's friend, who is recently divorced.
83	13	"Barter Sauce"	Wil Shriner	Michael Markowitz	January 28, 2002	40215–083	16.51
Becker barters medical treatment in exchange for goods and services from Reggie, Bob, and Jake.
84	14	"V-Day"	Andy Ackerman	Kate Angelo	February 4, 2002	40215–087	17.31
Becker dreads attending his ex-wife's wedding on Valentine's Day.
85	15	"It Had to Be Ew"	Andy Ackerman	Story by : Ritch Shydner; Teleplay by : Liz Astrof	February 25, 2002	40215–084	17.46
Becker is disturbed when Jake's girlfriend shows disgust at the suggestion that she is interested in John.
86	16	"Let's Talk About Sex"	Darryl Bates	Marsha Myers	March 4, 2002	40215–085	17.29
Margaret makes Becker speak at a local school about nutrition, but the kids ask questions about sex instead.
87	17	"Picture Imperfect"	Gail Mancuso	Liz Astrof	March 11, 2002	40215–091	16.16
Becker publishes an article, but a picture of a very ugly man appears instead of his own.
88	18	"Talking Points"	Chris Brougham	Russ Woody	March 18, 2002	40215–086	17.98
Becker gets a portable talking computer for his speech-impaired patient, with unintended consequences.
89	19	"Too Much, Too Late"	Leonard R. Garner Jr.	Matthew Weiner	April 15, 2002	40215–088	12.98
Jake receives a list of life goals he had written in high school, and realizes he hasn't completed any of them.
90	20	"Piece Talks"	Darryl Bates	David Isaacs	April 22, 2002	40215–090	12.89
Reggie's freezer breaks down, and she buys a new one from Bob's friend. Meanwhile, Becker gives sex advice to an 80-year-old couple.
91	21	"Parannoyed"	Andy Ackerman	Ian Gurvitz	April 29, 2002	40215–089	14.67
Newcomer Chris Connor (Nancy Travis) arrives in the Bronx and makes her presence felt; Becker, meanwhile, is convinced one of his neighbors is out to get him.
92	22	"MisSteaks"	Andy Ackerman	Anne Flett-Giordano & Chuck Ranberg	May 6, 2002	40215–092	16.10
When Becker receives some expensive steaks from a patient, his new neighbor Chris cajoles him into throwing a party.
93	23	"Much Ado About Nothing"	Gail Mancuso	Marsha Myers	May 13, 2002	40215–093	15.73
Becker is surprisingly concerned when he learns that his new neighbor Chris has left town without saying goodbye. Reggie assumes that Becker has more than casual feelings for Chris. Linda sublets her job for a week to a girl who actually manages to do less work than Linda.
94	24	"Everybody Loves Becker"	Andy Ackerman	Kate Angelo	May 20, 2002	40215–094	17.28
Reggie and Chris compete for Becker's affection. Linda takes Margaret out for a night on the town.

=== Season 5 (2002–03) ===
No. overall	No. in season	Title	Directed by	Written by	Original release date	Prod. code	U.S. viewers (millions)
95	1	"Someone's in the Kitchen with Reggie?"	Gregg Heschong	Ian Gurvitz	October 6, 2002	40215–095	11.75
Becker battles with himself over which woman to romance - Reggie or Chris. Linda argues with Margaret over what the term "next Thursday" means.
96	2	"Do the Right Thing"	Andy Ackerman	Ian Gurvitz	October 13, 2002	40215–096	10.76
Becker tries to convince Chris that he chose to be with her before he learned that Reggie was leaving town, but Chris doesn't believe him. Margaret and Linda try to find out the identity of a man who claims he is a former patient. Jake and Bob decide to follow in Reggie's footsteps and travel.
97	3	"L.A. Woman"	Darryl Bates	Russ Woody	October 20, 2002	40215–097	10.83
Neighbors Becker and Chris do whatever they can to annoy each other. Linda pretends she is from L.A. to impress a new man she is dating. Jake worries that Amanda is decorating his apartment too girly.
98	4	"And the Heartbeat Goes on"	Gail Mancuso	Perry Rein & Gigi McCreery	October 27, 2002	40215–098	9.51
Becker is asked to keep visiting a patient who is seriously ill.
99	5	"The Grand Gesture"	Gail Mancuso	Michael Rowe	November 3, 2002	40215–099	10.21
Becker tries "one last time" to romance Chris. The diner gets a new manager.
100	6	"The 100th"	Ken Levine	Ken Levine & David Isaacs	November 17, 2002	40215–100	10.57
Becker tries to discourage a friend from expressing interest in Chris by telling him that she is gay. Unfortunately, the friend sets up Chris with a lesbian acquaintance. Linda wins $100 in a radio contest. Bob buys a pair of walkie-talkies so that he and Jake can stay in constant contact.
101	7	"Papa Does Preach"	Chris Brougham	Norm Gunzenhauser	November 24, 2002	40215–102	10.65
Becker treats a patient with multiple personalities. Chris and Jake annoy each other. Bob becomes a big brother to a 10-year-old boy.
102	8	"Atlas Shirked"	Darryl Bates	Liz Astrof	December 1, 2002	40215–101	12.16
Becker tries to learn what happened to the atlas he bought. Chris takes responsibility for everyone's agendas. Bob plans his mother's funeral.
103	9	"Blind Injustice"	Ken Levine	Liz Astrof	December 8, 2002	40215–103	10.71
Jake feels further handicapped by his blindness when he inadvertently allows a crook to rob the diner. He feels vindicated later when he thinks he has found the crook.
104	10	"Chris-Mess"	Gail Mancuso	Kate Angelo	December 15, 2002	40215–105	10.53
Chris is jealous when Becker plans to spend Christmas in Vermont with a magazine editor he is dating. Margaret invites Linda to go caroling with her church group. Bob fears that a street-corner Santa is out to get him.
105	11	"Once Upon a Time"	Gail Mancuso	James Petrille	January 5, 2003	40215–104	9.71
Margaret is not expecting any special treatment on the tenth anniversary of her working with Becker. Chris finds Jake's old keyboard. Bob hides at the diner from an angry tenant who wants him to fix a clogged drain.
106	12	"Bad to the Bone"	Wil Shriner	Russ Woody	February 2, 2003	40215–107	11.29
Jake and Bob assume from overhearing a phone call that Chris and Becker are sleeping together. Becker tries to scare a sexually active teen into using condoms.
107	13	"I've Got Friends I Haven't Used Yet"	Andy Ackerman	Ian Gurvitz	February 9, 2003	40215–110	12.10
Becker gets a visit from his college roommate, Rick Cooper (Kelsey Grammer). Linda thinks Margaret is having an affair.
108	14	"The Pain in the Neck"	Randy Carter	Perry Rein & Gigi McCreery	February 16, 2003	40215–106	11.33
Becker is upset when a patient substitutes his Christian Science faith for medical treatment. Linda tries to continue the charade of her "long-distance" relationship with a New York City resident. Bob brags that he is part Native American and tries to cash in on his newly discovered heritage.
109	15	"Nightmare on Becker Street"	Gail Mancuso	Michael Rowe	March 2, 2003	40215–109	12.98
Becker is stalked by a frisky but elderly neighbor (Betty Garrett) who is determined to make him her man. Linda decides to tell the truth about where she resides to her boyfriend, who thinks she lives in L.A.
110	16	"The Job"	Darryl Bates	Patricia Breen	March 9, 2003	40215–108	11.74
Becker is frustrated with his practice and applies for a research position in Baltimore, without telling his staff or friends. His suspicious behavior leads them to believe he's either ill or on drugs.
111	17	"Thank You for Not Smoking"	Mike Uppendahl	Liz Astrof	March 16, 2003	40215–111	11.24
Becker feels stifled when Chris prohibits smoking in the diner and Margaret prohibits it in the office. Bob convinces Jake that Amanda is cheating on him. Linda persuades John to treat her friend Holli's dog.
112	18	"Amanda Moves Out"	Mike Uppendahl	Perry Rein & Gigi McCreery	March 30, 2003	40215–112	8.59
Amanda leaves Jake for a deliveryman. Becker's withdrawal from smoking is driving everybody crazy - again. Chris awaits her delivery of hair conditioner.
113	19	"Ms Fortune"	Chris Brougham	Russ Woody	April 6, 2003	40215–113	9.83
A palm reader comes to the diner. Despite his own objections, Becker lets her take a look at his palm. Inspired by the psychic, Linda invests her inheritance in a grapefruit company.
114	20	"Mr. and Ms. Conception"	Darryl Bates	Michael Rowe	April 13, 2003	40215–114	10.80
Becker is frustrated with a couple who seek counseling on conception and keep misinterpreting his advice. Chris flirts with a fire marshal to avoid a ticket. Bob's attempt to charm a police officer out of a jaywalking ticket backfires.
115	21	"Chris's Ex"	Gail Mancuso	Ian Gurvitz	April 20, 2003	40215–115	7.58
When Chris's ex-husband suddenly appears and stays at her apartment, Becker tries everything possible to keep the divorced couple apart.
116	22	"Daytime Believer"	Chris Brougham	Kate Angelo	April 20, 2003	40215–116	8.35
After a series of erotic daydreams about Chris, Becker realizes he still has feelings for her but wonders if she feels the same way about him. After Linda's purse was stolen and she was involved in an accident on her way to work, she fears another bad thing is going to happen to her because she believes that bad things always happen in threes.

=== Season 6 (2003–04) ===
No. overall	No. in season	Title	Directed by	Written by	Original release date	Prod. code	Viewers (millions)
117	1	"What's Love Got to Do with It?"	Chris Brougham	Ian Gurvitz	October 8, 2003	40215–117	10.37
Becker and Chris address their developing relationship. Chris tries to have a hospital bill reduced. Jake sells his dreadlocks to pay the rent. Linda thinks about getting religion. Jake's old buddy Hector shows up at the diner.
118	2	"Dates & Nuts"	Chris Brougham	Bobby Gaylor	October 15, 2003	40215–118	8.87
Chris pressures Becker into setting a time and place for their first date. Hector convinces Jake to make extra money by sampling experimental medications. Linda makes Margaret feel guilty for flirting her way out of a traffic ticket.
119	3	"A Little Ho-mance"	Darryl Bates	Maisha Closson	October 22, 2003	40215–119	9.24
Becker tries to plan a romantic first date with Chris, but unforeseen obstacles constantly appear. Jake receives shocking news about his grandmother after she dies in a retirement home.
120	4	"Spontaneous Combustion"	Ken Levine	Gary Dontzig & Steven Peterman	October 29, 2003	40215–120	10.82
Becker and Chris try too hard to consummate their relationship. Jake mourns his grandmother. Linda feng shui's the office.
121	5	"Afterglow"	Chris Brougham	David Isaacs and Ken Levine	November 12, 2003	40215–121	10.51
Chris tries to get Becker to be more considerate of her feelings. Linda gets Margaret a night job with a "telemarketer." Hector tricks Jake into selling porn magazines.
122	6	"The Unbelievable Wrongness of Talking"	Mike Uppendahl	Lisa Albert	November 19, 2003	40215–123	11.10
Chris is frustrated when Becker repeatedly refuses to maintain his side of a conversation. Linda claims that she has met "the one." Hector tries to persuade Jake to invest in his latest get-rich-quick scheme.
123	7	"Sister Spoils the Turkey"	Darryl Bates	Joyce Gittlin	November 26, 2003	40215–122	11.83
Becker and Chris's plans for a quiet Thanksgiving dinner are disrupted by the appearance of Chris's sister Grace (Jaime Pressly).
124	8	"Chock Full o' Nuts"	Chris Brougham	Matt Ember	December 3, 2003	40215–124	10.40
A large number of street people flock about the diner and Becker's office. Jake's grandmother leaves him $25,000.
125	9	"A First Class Flight"	Ken Levine	Dawn DeKeyser	December 17, 2003	40215–125	9.23
Chris is incensed when Becker receives a free trip to Las Vegas and doesn't invite her. An "odd duck" plastic surgeon takes over Becker's practice during his absence.
126	10	"Margaret Sings the Blues"	Chris Brougham	Maisha Closson	January 7, 2004	40215–126	11.65
Margaret is depressed about her career path after hearing about a childhood friend who has become wealthy. Becker tries to train Linda to give flu shots.
127	11	"Snow Means Snow"	Mike Uppendahl	Bobby Gaylor	January 14, 2004	40215–127	11.04
Chris plans a trip to Bermuda with Becker. Margaret looks forward to a weekend without Louis. A psychic tells Linda she's going to meet the man of her dreams.
128	12	"Subway Story"	Ian Gurvitz	Gary Dontzig & Steven Peterman	January 21, 2004	40215–128	10.49
Some important computer files disappear so Linda and Margaret try to find them, all the while thinking it was Linda's fault. Some out-of-town friends have come to see Becker but he's late, so Chris must entertain them. Becker is trying to get home on the subway but an old woman needs help getting to her destination. Becker stops to help her, but she needs to be helped again and again. When he finally gets her to her destination, she doesn't want to go up to the street.
129	13	"D.N.R."	Chris Brougham	Ian Gurvitz & Dave Hackel	January 28, 2004	40215–129	10.55
The series concludes as Chris fears that Becker is going to break up with her after he invites her to dinner at a nice restaurant with no explanation. Jake decides how to spend the inheritance from his grandmother. Linda finds a boyfriend on the subway. There are some subtle story aspects, such as Ted Danson's real wife — Mary Steenburgen — appearing as a patient.
