= Barry Corbin =

American actor (born 1940)

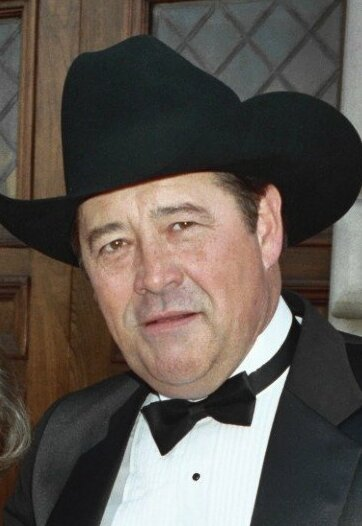
- Corbin in 1993
- Born: Leonard Barrie Corbin; October 16, 1940 (age 85); Lamesa, Texas, U.S.
- Education: Texas Tech University
- Occupation: Actor
- Years active: 1964–present
- Spouses: Marie Elyse Soape (m. 1965; div. 1974) Susan Berger (m. 1976; div. 1992) Jo Corbin (m. 2015)
- Children: 4
- Father: Kilmer B. Corbin
- Website: barrycorbin.com

Leonard Barrie Corbin (born October 16, 1940) is an American actor. He is best known for his starring role as Maurice Minnifield on the television series Northern Exposure (1990–1995), which earned him two consecutive Primetime Emmy Award nominations.

His other notable credits include the films Urban Cowboy (1980), Stir Crazy (1980), Six Pack (1982), WarGames (1983), and No Country for Old Men (2007), as well as the television series Dallas (1979–1984), Lonesome Dove (1989), One Tree Hill (2003–2009), The Closer (2007–2012), The Ranch (2016–2020), Yellowstone (2021), and Tulsa King (2022).

== Early life ==
Corbin's mother gave him his middle name in honor of author Sir James M. Barrie. He played football briefly in eighth grade, but soon moved to the arts, including acting and ballet classes. He graduated from Monterey High School in Lubbock, Texas. Corbin studied theater arts at Texas Tech University in Lubbock.

At 21, he joined the U.S. Marine Corps, served two years, and then returned to Texas Tech.

== Career ==
Corbin began his career in the 1960s as a Shakespearean actor, but today is more likely to be seen in the role of the sheriff, military leader, or some other authority figure, though on occasion, he has portrayed murderous villains. To moviegoers, he is well remembered as General Beringer in WarGames, John Travolta's uncle Bob Davis in Urban Cowboy, Clint Eastwood's costar in Any Which Way You Can, and Roscoe Brown, July Johnson's bumbling deputy in the acclaimed Western Lonesome Dove.

From 1979 until 1984, Corbin appeared as Sheriff Fenton Washburn in several episodes of Dallas. In 1983, he co-starred in the television miniseries The Thorn Birds. Corbin played Mary Carson's stockman Pete, who teaches the Clearys' sons how to shear sheep on their aunt's gigantic Australian sheep station, Drogheda. Also in 1983, Corbin played Merit Sawyer in the television series Boone, cancelled after 10 episodes. Corbin's role was as a stern father to the young actor Tom Byrd, who played Boone Sawyer, an aspiring singer. Corbin played Franz Grebner, Chief of Investigation for Fort Bragg, in the television miniseries Fatal Vision.

From 1990 to 1995, Corbin portrayed former astronaut and local business leader Maurice Minnifield on Northern Exposure, for which he received nominations in 1993 and 1994 for Primetime Emmy Award for Outstanding Supporting Actor in a Drama Series.

In 1994, Corbin narrated the acclaimed TV documentary Moon Shot, telling the story of the 1960s space race from the first-person viewpoint of Mercury Seven astronaut Deke Slayton. From 2007 to 2012, Corbin appeared in the recurring role of Clay Johnson, father of Deputy Chief Brenda Leigh Johnson on The Closer.

Corbin played the role of General Carville in consecutive video games developed by Westwood Studios: in 1998, Red Alert: Retaliation; in 2000, Command & Conquer: Red Alert 2; and in 2001, Command & Conquer: Yuri's Revenge.

In 2003, Corbin co-starred with Northern Exposure castmate John Cullum in "Blackwater Elegy", a short film written by Matthew Porter and co-directed by Porter and Joe O'Brien.

From 2003 to 2009, Corbin played Whitey Durham, the basketball coach for the Tree Hill Ravens on the drama series One Tree Hill. He also had a role in 2007's No Country for Old Men.

Corbin lost most of his hair in the 1990s due to alopecia areata. Since then, he has played various roles with a shaved head, wearing a cowboy hat, or occasionally wearing a full toupee.

Corbin is the signature voice of radio station KPLX in Fort Worth, Texas, and has also voiced trailers and promotions for CMT and various other country radio stations. In 2014, he became the spokesman for the Texas Veterans Land Board. He also played a role in the Netflix series The Ranch.

In 2020, Corbin had a recurring guest role as Everett Acker in Better Call Saul.

== Personal life ==
Corbin has won many cutting-horse competitions. Much of his spare time is spent riding horses and tending to cattle on his small ranch near Fort Worth. He has volunteered his time to charity for many years, including rodeos and being spokesman for the National Alopecia Areata Foundation. In 2006, he participated in the Lubbock centennial.

In September 2011, Corbin was given a lifetime achievement award by the Estes Park Film Festival in Estes Park, Colorado. The Texas Film Hall of Fame inducted Corbin into its membership on March 8, 2012. In 2014, he was inducted into the National Multicultural Western Heritage Museum.

== Filmography ==
=== Film ===
| Year | Title | Role | Notes |
|---|---|---|---|
| 1980 | Urban Cowboy | Bob Davis | |
| 1980 | Stir Crazy | Warden Walter Beatty | |
| 1980 | Any Which Way You Can | Fat Zack Tupper | |
| 1981 | Dead & Buried | Phil | |
| 1981 | The Night the Lights Went Out in Georgia | Wimbish | |
| 1982 | The Ballad of Gregorio Cortez | B.R. Abernathy | |
| 1982 | Six Pack | Sheriff "Big John" Stone | |
| 1982 | The Best Little Whorehouse in Texas | C.J. | |
| 1982 | Honkytonk Man | Derwood Arnspriger | |
| 1983 | WarGames | General Jack Beringer, Commander of NORAD | |
| 1983 | The Man Who Loved Women | Roy Carr | |
| 1985 | What Comes Around | Leon Redden | |
| 1985 | My Science Project | Lew Harlan | |
| 1986 | Nothing in Common | Andrew Woolridge | |
| 1986 | Hard Traveling | Frank Burton | |
| 1987 | Under Cover | Sergeant Irwin Lee | |
| 1987 | Off the Mark | Walt Warner | |
| 1988 | Permanent Record | Jim Sinclair | |
| 1988 | Critters 2: The Main Course | Harv | |
| 1988 | It Takes Two | George Lawrence | |
| 1989 | Who's Harry Crumb? | P.J. Downing | |
| 1990 | Short Time | Captain | |
| 1990 | Ghost Dad | Mr. Emery Collins | |
| 1990 | The Hot Spot | Sheriff | |
| 1991 | Conagher | Charlie McCloud | |
| 1991 | Career Opportunities | Officer Don | |
| 1996 | Solo | General Clyde Haynes | |
| 1996 | Curdled | Lodger | |
| 1997 | The Fanatics | Robert Blister | |
| 1999 | Judgment Day: The Ellie Nesler Story | Tony Serra | |
| 1999 | Held Up | Pembry | |
| 2000 | Timequest | Lyndon B. Johnson | |
| 2001 | The Journeyman | Charlie Ledbetter | |
| 2001 | No One Can Hear You | Sheriff Joe Webster | |
| 2001 | Race to Space | Earl Vestal | |
| 2001 | The Gristle | Senator Dorm | |
| 2002 | Clover Bend | Cotton | |
| 2003 | Dunsmore | Sheriff Breen | |
| 2003 | Tin Can Shinny | Daddy Jack | |
| 2005 | Yesterday's Dreams | Pastor | |
| 2005 | River's End | Sheriff 'Buster' Watkins | |
| 2005 | The Dukes of Hazzard | Mr. Pullman | Uncredited |
| 2006 | Waitin' to Live | Buford Pike | |
| 2006 | Beautiful Dreamer | Grandpa | |
| 2007 | No Country for Old Men | Ellis | |
| 2007 | The Grand | Jimminy 'Lucky' Faro | |
| 2007 | Trail End | Hank | Short |
| 2007 | In the Valley of Elah | Arnold Bickman | |
| 2008 | Lake City | George | |
| 2008 | Beer for My Horses | Buck Baker | |
| 2009 | That Evening Sun | Thurl Chessor | |
| 2009 | Not Since You | Uncle Dennis | |
| 2010 | Bloodworth | Itchy | |
| 2010 | Rising Stars | Farmer | |
| 2010 | Nonames | Ed | |
| 2010 | Feed the Fish | Axel Andersen | |
| 2010 | The Next Door Neighbor | Judge Rodgers | |
| 2011 | Sedona | Les | |
| 2011 | Valley of the Sun | Gene Taggert | |
| 2011 | Universal Squadrons | Deakin | |
| 2011 | Redemption: For Robbing the Dead | Judge Smith | |
| 2011 | 3 Blind Saints | Rusty Pickens | |
| 2012 | Cinema Six | Roger | |
| 2012 | The Man Who Shook the Hand of Vicente Fernandez | Walker | |
| 2012 | Born Wild | Ray Jennings | |
| 2013 | This Is Where We Live | Bode | |
| 2014 | Dawn of the Crescent Moon | Cyrus | |
| 2014 | The Homesman | Buster Shaver | |
| 2014 | Planes: Fire & Rescue | Ol' Jammer | Voice |
| 2014 | Finding Harmony | Grady Pickett | |
| 2015 | Windsor | Gil Denton | |
| 2015 | Beyond the Farthest Star | Chief Burns | |
| 2015 | Christmas in the Smokies | Wade Haygood | |
| 2016 | Last Man Club | Pete Williams | |
| 2016 | New Life | Oscar | |
| 2017 | Mountain Top | Sam Miller | |
| 2017 | The Valley | Gary | |
| 2017 | All Saints | Forrest | |
| 2017 | An American in Texas | Larry Korchinsky | |
| 2018 | Farmer of the Year | Hap Anderson | |
| 2019 | Trading Paint | Deputy | |
| 2019 | Eminence Hill | Noah | |
| 2020 | Star Trek: First Frontier | John April | |
| 2023 | Killers of the Flower Moon | Undertaker Turton | |
| 2023 | Funny Thing About Love | Grandpa Joe | |
| 2025 | El Tonto Por Cristo | Terry Don | |

=== Television ===
| Year | Title | Role | Notes |
|---|---|---|---|
| 1976 | Movin' On | Waldo | Episode: "The Old South Will Rise Again" (uncredited) |
| 1976 | NBC Special Treat | Stokey Andrews | Episode: "Big Henry and the Polka Dot Kid" |
| 1979–1984 | Dallas | Sheriff Fenton Washburn | 9 episodes |
| 1981 | M*A*S*H | Sgt. Joe Vickers | Episode: "Your Retention, Please" |
| 1981 | This House Possessed | Lieutenant Fletcher | Television film |
| 1981 | The Killing of Randy Webster | Nick Hanson | Television film |
| 1981 | Murder in Texas | Dist. Atty. McMasters | Television film |
| 1981 | Bitter Harvest | Dr. Agajanian | Television film |
| 1982 | Hart to Hart | Sheriff Bud Williams | Episode: "Hart, Line, and Sinker" |
| 1983 | The Thorn Birds | Pete | 4 parts (TV miniseries) |
| 1983 | Travis McGee | Sheriff Hack Ames | Television film |
| 1984 | Flight 90: Disaster on the Potomac | Burt Hamilton | Television film |
| 1984 | The Duck Factory | Hubbell Browning | Episode: "The Way We Weren't" |
| 1986 | The A-Team | J.J. Kincaid | Episode: "Waiting for Insane Wayne" |
| 1986 | The Twilight Zone | Pete Siekovich | Episode: "Dead Run" |
| 1986 | Firefighter | Captain Johnson | Television film |
| 1987 | Spies | Thomas "C of B" Brady | Main role |
| 1987 | LBJ: The Early Years | Judge Alvin J. Wirtz | Television film |
| 1987 | Murder, She Wrote | Lt. Lou Flannigan | Episode: "The Bottom Line Is Murder" |
| 1987 | Matlock | Army Col. Steven McRea | Episode: "The Court Martial" |
| 1988 | Man Against the Mob | Big Mac McCleary | Television film |
| 1989 | Lonesome Dove | Roscoe Brown | 4 episodes |
| 1989 | I Know My First Name Is Steven | Officer Warner | |
| 1990–1995 | Northern Exposure | Maurice J. Minnifield/Mace Mobrey | 110 episodes (Main role) |
| 1991 | The Chase | Wallis | Television film |
| 1991 | Conagher | Charlie McCloud, Stage Driver | Television film |
| 1994 | Moon Shot • The Inside Story of America's Race to the Moon | Narrator/Deke Slayton (voice) | Television film; documentary |
| 1995 | Deadly Family Secrets | "Mr. Potter" | Television film |
| 1995 | Life with Louie | Uncle Sammy (voice) | Episode: "The Fourth Thursday in November" |
| 1996 | Ellen | Jack Penney | Episode: "A Penney Saved..." |
| 1996–1997 | The Big Easy | C.D. LeBlanc | 35 episodes |
| 1997 | Columbo | Clifford Calvert | Episode: "A Trace of Murder" |
| 1998 | The Magnificent Seven | Wickes | Episode: "Working Girls" |
| 1998 | The Closer | Angus Clayton | Episode: "Pilot" |
| 1998 | Spin City | Peter Noland | Episode: "The Deer Hunter" |
| 1998 | JAG | Percival Bertram | Episode: "Act of Terror" |
| 1998 | The Drew Carey Show | Chuck Fifer | 2 episodes |
| 1999 | King of the Hill | Fire Chief (voice) | Episode: "A Fire-fighting We Will Go" |
| 1999 | Chicken Soup for the Soul | Doctor | Episode: "The Real Father" |
| 1999 | Walker, Texas Ranger | Ben Crowder | Episode: "Widow Maker" |
| 1999 | The Outer Limits | Carlton Powers | Episode: "Joyride" |
| 2001 | Crossfire Trail | Sheriff Walter Moncrief | Television film |
| 2002 | Reba | J.V. McKinney | Episode: "Meet the Parents" |
| 2002 | Hope Ranch | Shorty | Television film |
| 2003 | Monte Walsh | Bob the Storekeeper | Television film |
| 2003–2009 | One Tree Hill | Coach Whitey Durham | 90 episodes (Main role) |
| 2005 | Celebrity Poker Showdown | Himself | Game show |
| 2006 | Hidden Places | Sheriff John Doggins | Television film |
| 2007–2012 | The Closer | Clay Johnson | 13 episodes |
| 2008 | Psych | Billy Joe | Episode: "There Might Be Blood" |
| 2008–2009 | The Unit | Carson | 2 episodes |
| 2009 | Wyvern | Hass | Television film |
| 2009 | Ben 10: Alien Swarm | Grandpa Max Tennyson | Television film |
| 2012 | Ghoul | Grandfather | Television film |
| 2012 | The Looney Tunes Show | Santa Claus (voice) | Episode: "A Christmas Carol" |
| 2012–2013 | Suit Up | Dick Devereaux | 16 episodes |
| 2012–2014 | Modern Family | Merle Tucker | 3 episodes |
| 2012–2014 | Anger Management | Ed | 100 episodes (Main role) |
| 2013 | Dallas | J.R. Ewing's lawyer/executor | Episode: "Ewings Unite!" |
| 2014 | Parenthood | Ernie | Episode: "Fraud Alert" |
| 2015 | Blood & Oil | Clifton Lundegren | 6 episodes |
| 2016–2020 | The Ranch | Dale the Veterinarian | 32 episodes |
| 2019 | Young Sheldon | Mr. Gilford | Episode: "A Math Emergency and Perky Palms" |
| 2020 | Better Call Saul | Everett Acker | 3 episodes |
| 2020–2022 | 9-1-1: Lone Star | Stuart Ryder | 3 episodes |
| 2021 | Yellowstone | Ross | Episode: "Under a Blanket of Red" |
| 2022–2025 | Tulsa King | Babe Keller | Recurring role, 7 episodes |

=== Video games ===
| Year | Title | Role | Notes |
|---|---|---|---|
| 1996 | The Pandora Directive | Jackson Cross | |
| 1996 | Steven Spielberg's Director's Chair | Warden | |
| 1998 | Red Alert: Retaliation | General Ben Carville | |
| 2000 | Command & Conquer: Red Alert 2 | Gen. Ben Carville (General Thorn) / American Taunts | |
| 2001 | Command & Conquer: Yuri's Revenge | Gen. Ben Carville | |
| 2017 | Madden NFL 18: Longshot | Hank Jamison | |
| 2018 | Madden NFL 19: Longshot Homecoming | Hank Jamison | |

== Awards and nominations ==
| Award/Organization | Year | Category | Work | Result | Ref. |
|---|---|---|---|---|---|
| Viewers for Quality Television | 1991 | Q Award - Best Supporting Actor in a Quality Drama Series | Northern Exposure | Nominated | |
| Primetime Emmy Awards | 1993 | Primetime Emmy Award for Outstanding Supporting Actor in a Drama Series | Northern Exposure | Nominated | |
| Primetime Emmy Awards | 1994 | Primetime Emmy Award for Outstanding Supporting Actor in a Drama Series | Northern Exposure | Nominated | |
| Action On Film International Film Festival | 2014 | Best Supporting Actor - TV film | Dawn of the Crescent Moon | Nominated | |
| Action On Film International Film Festival | 2016 | Best Supporting Actor - Feature | Last Man Club | Nominated | |
| Woods Hole Film Festival | 2018 | Festival Directors Award - Best Actor | Farmer of the Year | Won | |
