= Andrew Gottlieb =

American producer and a comedy writer

Andrew Gottlieb is an American producer and a comedy writer.

== Career ==
He has written sitcoms (The Single Guy, Watching Ellie), feature films (Agent Fabulous), daytime serial (ABC Daytime's Loving), and books (In The Paint, Death to All Sacred Cows, Drink Play F@#k).

He was an Executive Producer of Z Rock.

His book Drink, Play, F@#k: One Man's Search for Anything Across Ireland, Las Vegas, and Thailand is a parody on a memoir Eat, Pray, Love by Elizabeth Gilbert.
