= Ratscalibur =

2015 novel by Josh Lieb

- Book Cover
- Author: Josh Lieb
- Illustrator: Tom Lintern
- Language: English
- Series: Chronicles of the Low Realm
- Genre: Adventure, Children's, Fantasy
- Publisher: Razorbill
- Publication date: May 5, 2015
- Publication place: United States
- Media type: Print (hardback & paperback)
- Pages: 192
- ISBN: 978-1-59514-242-9

Ratscalibur is a 2015 children's novel written by Josh Lieb and illustrated by Tom Lintern. It is a humorous fantasy set in New York City and loosely based on the Arthurian legends. It is the first book in the Chronicles of the Low Realm series.

== Plot ==
After moving to the big city, 11-year-old Joey is turned into a rat by a rat magician (or "Ragician") and sent on a mission to report to Uther, king of the rat kingdom Ravalon. On the way, he inadvertently pulls the legendary Spork, named Ratscalibur, from the legendary Scone, and is hailed as the prophesied hero. Subsequently, he is expected to go on a quest to save the rats from the wicked wizard Salaman, if he is to be restored to his human form.

== Characters ==
- Joey, an 11-year-old human boy, later a rat hero
- Patrick, Joey's uncle
- Gondorff the Gray/red, an elderly Ragician (rat magician)
- Parsifur, a vain but courageous knight
- Brutilda, a guinea pig and bodyguard
- Aramis, the King's vizier
- Salaman, a mysterious enemy of Ravalon
- King Uther, King of Ravalon
- Squirrelin, a Squagician (squirrel magician)
- Princess Yislene, King Uther's daughter

== Allusions ==
There are many allusions throughout the book to the Arthurian legends. The book's title is a pun on Excalibur, the sword wielded by King Arthur, and much of its premise is a pastiche of tales of medieval chivalry and knights errant. Other allusions include the character Parsifur, a pun on the knight Percival; King Uther being an allusion to Uther Pendragon, the father of King Arthur; Ravalon being a pun on the legendary island Avalon; and the legendary "Spork in the Scone" a reference to the Sword in the Stone.

The book also alludes to The Lord of the Rings. Gondorff the Grey is a pun on Gandalf the Grey, and Salaman, the unseen enemy of Ravalon, is a pun on Saruman, a major antagonist of The Lord of the Rings. Gondorff's name also contains the name Gondor, a land from that series, and like Gandalf he takes on a different color. The story's use of several different "races" of animals, some friendly and some hostile, is also an allusion to the many races of Middle-earth.

Other allusions may also exist in the story, including the character Bruntilda being an allusion to Brunhilde, a Valkyrie of Germanic mythology; and Gondorff the Grey being a possible allusion to Henry Gondorff, a character from the 1973 film The Sting.
