= Pyrates =

1991 film by Noah Stern

- Directed by: Noah Stern
- Written by: Noah Stern
- Produced by: Jonathan Furie
- Starring: Kevin Bacon; Kyra Sedgwick; Bruce Martyn Payne; Kristin Dattilo
- Cinematography: Janusz Kamiński
- Edited by: Gib Jaffe
- Music by: Peter Himmelman
- Distributed by: Act III Communications; Vestron Video
- Release date: December 18, 1991
- Running time: 98 minutes
- Country: United States
- Language: English

Pyrates is a 1991 comedy film, starring Kevin Bacon and Kyra Sedgwick about a couple who experience pyrokinesis after having sex. Directed and written by Noah Stern, the film was released on VHS on December 18, 1991.

== Plot ==
When Ari (Kevin Bacon) and Sam (Kyra Sedgwick) first meet they realize that there is chemistry between them. When they have sex with each other, they experience pyrokinesis. However, as their love affair does not run smoothly, their friends Liam (Bruce Martyn Payne) and Pia (Kristin Dattilo) intervene to try to help. At one point when Sam is angry with Ari, Liam helps Ari to serenade her with a rendition the Soft Cell song Tainted Love.

== Cast ==
- Kevin Bacon as Ari
- Kyra Sedgwick as Sam
- Bruce Martyn Payne as Liam
- Kristin Dattilo as Pia
- Buckley Harris as Dr. Weiss
- Deborah Falconer as Rivkah
- David Pressman as Carlton
- Raymond O'Connor as Fireman
- Byrne Piven as Rabbi Lichtenstein
- Ernie Lee Banks as Wee Willie
- Mickey Jones as Wisconsin Del
- Petra Verkaik as Basia
- Clifford David as Advisor
- Tom Adams as John Rackham (uncredited)

== Reception ==
Reviews for Pyrates were generally negative. Derek Adams of Time Out criticized the film for containing few laughs, stating that "the first time a lava lamp explodes, the second time round though, and the joke's already gone too far". No Byline stated that 'with the principals coming across as charmlessly self-centred, this cornucopia of copulation is, despite an attempt at kooky episodic to-camera chit-chat, more hot air than hot stuff'. A reviewer for TV Guide stated that 'as a contemporary love story, Pyrates is well conceived and often sharply observed'. The TV Guide reviewer stated that 'Bacon and Sedgwick are both charming and exasperating as the modern lovers, a combination of self-centered innocence and mannered brittleness that rings all too true'. The TV Guide reviewer also commented that 'the supporting cast, particularly Bruce Martyn Payne and Kristin Dattilo as the friends who find themselves drawn into Ari and Sam's affair despite their best efforts to stay out, are uniformly good' but 'their work is undercut at every turn by the aggressively clever style' of the film'. Ultimately, the TV Guide reviewer thought that 'the director's smirk colors virtually every scene, and it's tough to get past'. The effect, in their view, 'is that of a glossy thesis film by a precocious and talented student who still needs to learn that all witty ideas are not created equal'. John Ferguson stated that Kevin Bacon and Kyra Sedgwick gave 'it their best shot, but director Noah Stern doesn't take the original idea anywhere interesting and, in the end, it's far too self-consciously wacky for its own good'. Ferguson also stated that 'Englishman abroad Bruce Martyn Payne - he would drop the middle name for Passenger 57 - offers solid support as Bacon's best chum'. Another reviewer stated that the film was a 'real oddity' and part of a 'peculiar mini-spate of films about pyrokinesis' in the late 1980s and early 1990s, which began with Firestarter. Leonard Maltin described the film as 'crudely scripted' and 'ineptly directed'. Another reviewer described the film as 'forgettable'. AllMovie's Sandra Brennan awarded the film a score of one and a half stars out of five.

== Home media ==
The film has been released on DVD in Australia.
