= Pat Finn =

American actor (1965–2025)

- Born: Patrick Cassidy Finn; July 31, 1965; Evanston, Illinois, U.S.
- Died: December 22, 2025 (aged 60); Los Angeles, California, U.S.
- Other name: Patrick Finn
- Education: Marquette University
- Occupation: Actor
- Years active: 1992–2025
- Spouse: Donna Crowley (m. 1990)
- Children: 3

Patrick Cassidy Finn (July 31, 1965 – December 22, 2025) was an American film and television actor. Initially performing with the comedy troupe The Second City in Chicago, he first gained attention for his main role as Dan Coleman on the CBS sitcom The George Wendt Show (1995).

Following The George Wendt Show, Finn had recurring roles on television as Phil Jr. on the CBS sitcom Murphy Brown (1995–1997) and Jim Frost on the NBC comedy-drama series Ed (2001–2002). He also had a number of supporting roles in comedy films throughout the 2000s, including Dude, Where's My Car? (2000), How High (2001), and I Love You, Beth Cooper (2009).

Finn's most notable role came as recurring character Bill Norwood on the ABC sitcom The Middle (2011–2018). He also had a main role as Bob Forman on the Nickelodeon science fiction series Marvin Marvin (2012–2013). Finn died in December 2025, due to complications from bladder cancer.

== Background ==
Finn was born in Evanston, Illinois, on July 31, 1965. He grew up in Wilmette, where he attended Loyola Academy. He graduated from Marquette University in 1987, where he played on the rugby team alongside Chris Farley.

== Career ==
After graduating, he moved to Chicago where he joined The Second City National Touring Company. He also performed with the iO Theater. After writing and performing in two Second City resident shows, Finn was cast as Dan Coleman on the CBS sitcom The George Wendt Show.

Finn had recurring roles on Murphy Brown, 3rd Rock from the Sun and Ed. He played the recurring character Bill Norwood on the ABC sitcom The Middle from 2010 to 2018. He starred as Bob Forman on the Nickelodeon sitcom Marvin Marvin from November 24, 2012, to April 27, 2013.

== Personal life ==
Finn was married to Donna Crowley. They had three children, Cassidy, Caitlin, and Ryan.

In 2022, Finn was diagnosed with bladder cancer. He died at his home in Los Angeles on December 22, 2025, at the age of 60.

== Filmography ==
=== Film ===
Year	Title	Role	Notes
1999	The Bachelor	Bolt	
2000	Dude, Where's My Car?	Rick	
2001	Prairie Dogs	Commercial Actor	Short film
2001	Love and Support	Russell	
2001	How High	Army Recruiter	
2002	Unconditional Love	Keith	
2004	Funky Monkey	Peters	
2004	Pee Shy	Dan	Short film
2006	Cloud 9	Wiener	
2006	Funny Money	Walter	Credited as Patt Finn
2009	Space Buddies	Bill Wolfson	
2009	I Love You, Beth Cooper	Coach Raupp	
2009	It's Complicated	Hotel Doctor	
2011	Spooky Buddies	Frankendude	Direct-to-video
2012	Santa Paws 2: The Santa Pups	Santa Claus	Direct-to-video
2013	Dealin' with Idiots	Opposing Coach	
2015	I Am Chris Farley	Himself	Documentary
2020	Selfie Dad	Marvin	
2021	Funny Thing About Love	John	
2022	Diamond in the Rough	Dan	
2023	Unexpected	Dr. Wells	
2026	Tangles	Agent Nelson	Posthumous release; final film role

=== Television ===
Year	Title	Role	Notes
1992	Jazz Freddy	Various	
1995	The George Wendt Show	Dan Coleman	Main role; 8 episodes
1995	Roseanne	Cal	Episode: "The Fifties Show"
1995–1997	Murphy Brown	Phil Jr.	10 episodes
1996	Caroline in the City	Steve	Episode: "Caroline and the Bridesmaids"
1996	Boys & Girls	Russell Chapman	TV movie
1997	Detention: The Siege at Johnson High	Mr. Kroft	TV movie
1998	Seinfeld	Joe Mayo	Episode: "The Reverse Peephole"
1998	Grown-Ups	Bud	TV movie Also known as Hostage High and Target for Rage
1999–2003	The Drew Carey Show	George / Mr. Delany	2 episodes
1998–2001	3rd Rock from the Sun	Chaz Montana / Paul	3 episodes
1999	Brother's Keeper	Construction Guy	Episode: "With Friends Like Porter"
1999	That '70s Show	Frank	Episode: "Halloween"
2000	The King of Queens	Tom Busterman	Episode: "Block Buster"
2000	Friends	Dr. Roger	Episode: "The One That Could Have Been"
2000	M.Y.O.B.	Anthony Filibuto	Episode: "French Connection" (credited as Patrick Finn)
2001	Three Sisters	Kevin	Episode: "The New Guy"
2001–2002	Ed	Jim Frost	8 episodes
2002	According to Jim	Ted	Episode: "The Baby Monitor"
2002	Less than Perfect	Luke McNamara	Episode: "The Vacation"
2003	Oliver Beene	Security Guard	Episode: "Divorce-O-Rama"
2003	Las Vegas	Jim Warner	Episode: "Semper Spy"
2003	With You in Spirit	Wayne Belmont	TV movie
2004	Humor Me	Paul	TV movie
2005	Committed	Rusty the Mailman	Episode: "The Return of Todd Episode"
2005	Yes, Dear	Scott	Episode: "A Little Breathing Room"
2005	Complete Savages	Chet Pringle	Episode: "Saving Old Lady Riley"
2005	Hollywood Vice		TV movie
2005	Curb Your Enthusiasm	Car Owner	Episode: "The End"
2006	The Bernie Mac Show	Zalinsky	Episode: "Fantasy Football"
2006–2007	My Boys	Charlie	4 episodes
2007	The Naked Trucker and T-Bones Show	Officer Rick	Episode: "Demo Tape"
2007	Out of Jimmy's Head	Daryl	Episode: "Mascot"
2007	The Suite Life of Zack & Cody	Sandy Butteaux	Episode: "Team Tipton"
2008	Unhitched	Phil	2 episodes
2008	Factory		Episode: "Builtgood Screwcutter 5000"
2010	House	Senator Anderson	Episode: "Office Politics"
2011–2018	The Middle	Bill Norwood	23 episodes
2012–2013	Marvin Marvin	Bob Forman / Dad Bob	Main cast; 18 episodes
2014	Kickin' It	Spanky Danger	Episode: "Tightroping the Shark"
2016	Bella and the Bulldogs	Mr. Kurtz	Episode: "Accept No Substitute"
2016	The Real O'Neals	Zack	Episode: "The Real Book Club"
2016	2 Broke Girls	Professor Reynolds	Episode: "And the College Experience"
2017	Dads in Parks	—N/a	Episode: "Mom Comedy with Pat Finn" (writer)
2018	The Thundermans	Pageant Contest Host	Episode: "Cookie Mistake"
2019	The Goldbergs	Kormy	Episode: "There Can Be Only One Highlander Club"
