= Gregg Heschong =

American cinematographer and television director

- Occupation(s): Cinematographer, television director and camera operator
- Years active: 1973–present

Gregg Heschong is an American cinematographer and television director.

For much of his career, he amassed a number cinematography credits in the television series The Tracey Ullman Show, Perfect Strangers, The George Carlin Show, Wanda at Large, 'Til Death, Twins, Better with You, $#*! My Dad Says and Fuller House. As well as working as a cinematographer and director for the series Family Matters, NewsRadio, Becker and True Jackson, VP.

Prior to a career in television, Heschong has also had a career in feature films working as a camera operator and director of photography on the films Firefox (1982), Tron (1982), Broadcast News (1987) and Who Framed Roger Rabbit (1988).

In 2006, Heschong received a Primetime Emmy nomination for his cinematography work on The New Adventures of Old Christine,
