= Joe Furey =

American comedian

Joe Furey outside the Magic Castle in Los Angeles

Joe Furey is an American Emmy Award and Writers Guild Award nominated writer, producer and comedian. His credits include Late Night with David Letterman, Newsradio, Watching Ellie, and Talkshow with Spike Feresten, as well as the feature film Love and Support, in which he also starred.

Furey has also worked as a producer and writer on the TV series Important Things with Demetri Martin (Comedy Central, 2009), Rob (CBS, 2012) The Soul Man (TV Land, 2012), Divorce (HBO, 2016), and What We Do in the Shadows (FX, 2019).

He edited the 1993 short film Through an Open Window, which was screened in the Un Certain Regard section at the 1992 Cannes Film Festival.

As a child actor Joe Furey appeared in dozens of TV commercials for such products as Coke, Burger King, Maxwell House, Wheat Chex, Contac, Hostess, Fruity Pebbles Cereal, etc. He worked making commercials from 1969 to 1986. Several of his brothers and sisters also did television commercials.

At Letterman, Furey was frequently featured in the sketches, perhaps most notably playing a heckler that Bill Murray dealt with.

After high school he received The Nancy Jo Ables Scholarship to study film at SUNY Purchase in NY.
