= The George Wendt Show =

1995 American sitcom TV series

- Genre: Sitcom
- Created by: Lew Schneider; Peter Tolan
- Written by: Mike Martineau; Gordon R. Mckee; Daphne Pollon; David Regal; Lew Schneider; Peter Tolan
- Directed by: Robby Benson; Rick Beren; Terry Hughes
- Starring: George Wendt; Pat Finn; Brian Doyle-Murray; Kate Hodge; Mark Christopher Lawrence
- Composer: Fred Kaz
- Country of origin: United States
- Original language: English
- No. of seasons: 1
- No. of episodes: 8 (2 unaired)

Production
- Executive producers: Peter Tolan; George Wendt
- Producers: Lew Schneider; Michael Petok
- Running time: 22 minutes
- Production companies: The Cloudland Company; Touchstone Television

Original release
- Network: CBS
- Release: March 8 – April 12, 1995

The George Wendt Show is an American sitcom television series that aired on CBS from March 8 to April 12, 1995. Based on the public radio show Car Talk, the series was a star vehicle for George Wendt after co-starring in the NBC sitcom Cheers throughout its run. However, the series was a ratings failure and was canceled after six episodes aired, out of the eight episodes produced.

== Premise ==
The series revolved around George and Dan Coleman (George Wendt and Pat Finn), two wise-cracking brothers who own a car garage in Madison, Wisconsin. In addition to running the garage, they were also hosts of Points and Plugs, a call-in radio show about car repair. However, the brothers would mostly get caught up in a number of crazy situations unrelated to cars. For instance, one episode focused on George having an itchy rash, a Halloween episode had George confront the spirit of his Uncle Lou and another had the brothers chaperone a high school prom.

== Cast ==
- George Wendt as George Coleman
- Pat Finn as Dan Coleman
- Mark Christopher Lawrence as Fletcher Williams
- Kate Hodge as Libby Schuster
- Brian Doyle-Murray as Finnie
- Tony Danza as Lou "Two Strikes" Coleman

== Episodes ==
No.	Title	Directed by	Written by	Original release date	Viewers (millions)
1	"Sweet Charity"	Rick Beren	David Regal	March 8, 1995	15.7
2	"A Need for Seed"	Unknown	Unknown	March 15, 1995	11.9
3	"Grave Concerns"	Rick Beren	Gordon R. McKee	March 22, 1995	9.8
4	"Rash Behavior"	Unknown	Unknown	March 29, 1995	8.9
5	"Prom Night: The Return"	Unknown	Unknown	April 5, 1995	7.9
6	"A River Runs Through His Head"	Unknown	Unknown	April 12, 1995	8.2
7	"And Here's to You, Mrs. Robertson"	N/A	N/A	Unaired	N/A
8	"My Brother, the Albatross"	Rick Beren	Peter Tolan	Unaired	N/A
