= Funny Thing About Love =

2021 American film

- Theatrical release poster
- Directed by: Adam White
- Written by: Adam White
- Produced by: Adam Montierth; Donovan Montierth
- Starring: Jon Heder; Summer Bellessa; Kevan Moezzi; Jason Gray; Brooke White; Pat Finn; Alaina Beauloye; Barry Corbin
- Cinematography: Aiden Chapparone
- Edited by: Joshua Oram
- Music by: Robert Allen Elliott
- Production companies: Brothers' Ink Productions; Pitch White Entertainment
- Distributed by: Gravitas Ventures
- Release date: December 3, 2021
- Running time: 96 minutes
- Country: United States
- Language: English

Funny Thing About Love is a 2021 American romantic comedy film directed by Adam White and starring Jon Heder, Summer Bellessa, Kevan Moezzi, Jason Gray, Brooke White, Pat Finn (in his final film role), Alaina Beauloye, and Barry Corbin.

== Premise ==
A successful business woman takes her boyfriend home for Thanksgiving, only to find her family is trying to reunite her with her lost love.

== Cast ==
- Summer Bellessa as Samantha
- Kevan Moezzi as Luke
- Jason Gray as Bryce
- Jon Heder as Charlie
- Brooke White as Annie
- Pat Finn as John
- Alaina Beauloye as Linda
- Brady Ellsworth as Truman
- Taylor Moriarty as Peyton
- Landen Adams as Michael
- Barry Corbin as Grandpa Joe

== Production ==
In an interview with Screen Rant, Heder spoke about the film, stating, "It's a rom-co. A little Hallmark-style - it's like a Hallmark movie with comedy in it, actual tried comedy, and it works. It's an ensemble piece with a lot of funny actors at a big family gathering around Thanksgiving during the Thanksgiving break."

== Release ==
In October 2021, Gravitas Ventures acquired the distribution rights to Funny Thing About Love. They gave the film a limited theatrical release, alongside a digital release, on December 3, 2021.

== Reception ==
Tara McNamara of Common Sense Media gave the film a mixed review, criticizing the script as "nothing special," but praising Heder and Corbin's performances.
