= Josh Lieb =

American writer and television producer

Josh Lieb is an American writer and television producer.

He was the showrunner of The Tonight Show Starring Jimmy Fallon and executive producer of NewsRadio, The Daily Show with Jon Stewart, and Pod Save America. He won seven Prime Time Emmy's as a producer and writer for The Daily Show. In 2009, he published a young adult novel, I Am A Genius of Unspeakable Evil and I Want to Be Your Class President, which was a New York Times Bestseller. In 2015, he published his second novel, Ratscalibur. His third book, Chapter Two is Missing, was released in October 2019.

Lieb was raised in Columbia, South Carolina, and graduated from Harvard University, where he was an editor of The Harvard Lampoon, the college humor magazine. After graduation, he found work writing for Twisted Puppet Theater, The Jon Stewart Show, and NewsRadio. He subsequently worked as a producer on many shows including The Simpsons, Drawn Together, What We Do in The Shadows, Silicon Valley, and Who is America?

Lieb's tenure at The Daily Show lasted from 2006 to 2010, during which he also served as executive producer of The Rally to Restore Sanity And/Or Fear and as co-editor and co-author of Earth: The Book.

In 2013, he wrote and directed a series of comedic shorts to raise money and awareness for the charity Water.Org. Stars featured in the shorts included Matt Damon, Jessica Biel, Sir Richard Branson, and Bono.

== Bibliography ==
=== Books ===
- I Am A Genius Of Unspeakable Evil And I Want To Be Your Class President (2009)
- Ratscalibur (2015)
- Chapter Two is Missing (2019)

=== Articles ===
- "Trump's caddy". Shouts & Murmurs. The New Yorker. 93 (10): 47. April 24, 2017.
