= Becker (TV series) =

American television sitcom (1998–2004)

- Genre: Sitcom
- Created by: Dave Hackel
- Starring: Ted Danson; Hattie Winston; Shawnee Smith; Alex Désert; Terry Farrell; Saverio Guerra; Nancy Travis; Jorge Garcia
- Composer: Bruce Miller
- Country of origin: United States
- Original language: English
- No. of seasons: 6
- No. of episodes: 129 (list of episodes)

Production
- Executive producers: Dave Hackel; Tim Berry; Ian Gurvitz
- Producers: Andy Ackerman; Tim Berry; Marsha Myers; Matthew Weiner; Michael Markowitz; Michael Rowe
- Camera setup: Multi-camera
- Running time: approx. 22 minutes
- Production companies: Dave Hackel Productions; Industry Entertainment; Paramount Television

Original release
- Network: CBS
- Release: November 2, 1998 – January 28, 2004

Becker is an American television sitcom created by Dave Hackel that aired on CBS for six seasons from November 2, 1998, to January 28, 2004, with a total of 129 episodes. Produced by Dave Hackel Productions and Industry Entertainment in association with Paramount Television, the show is set in the New York City borough of the Bronx, and stars Ted Danson as the title character, John Becker, a misanthropic doctor who operates a small practice and is constantly annoyed by his patients, co-workers, and friends, and practically everything and everybody else in his world. Despite everything, his patients and friends are loyal because Becker genuinely cares about them.

== Premise ==
The show revolves around Becker and the things that annoyed him, although the members of the supporting cast also have their moments. The relationships between Becker and Reggie, and, later, Becker and Chris form the key plots of many episodes. The show tackles other serious issues as well, such as race, homosexuality, transgender identities, addiction, nymphomania, schizophrenia, cerebral AVM, and political correctness.

== Episodes ==
Season	Episodes	Originally released	
Season	Episodes	First released	Last released
1	22	November 2, 1998	May 17, 1999
2	24	September 20, 1999	May 22, 2000
3	24	October 9, 2000	May 14, 2001
4	24	October 1, 2001	May 20, 2002
5	22	October 6, 2002	April 20, 2003
6	13	October 8, 2003	January 28, 2004

== Cast and characters ==
- Ted Danson as Dr. John Becker
- Hattie Winston as Margaret Wyborn
- Shawnee Smith as Linda
- Alex Désert as Jake Malinak
- Terry Farrell as Regina 'Reggie' Kostas (seasons 1–4)
- Saverio Guerra as Bob (recurring, seasons 1–2; main, seasons 3–5)
- Nancy Travis as Christine "Chris" Connor (guest, season 4; main, seasons 5–6)
- Jorge Garcia as Hector Lopez (season 6)

=== Terry Farrell's departure ===
Terry Farrell was written out of Star Trek: Deep Space Nine (where she played Jadzia Dax) after her contract expired without renegotiation. Soon after, Farrell got the role of Reggie. According to Farrell, the original plan was for Reggie and Becker to have a relationship with romantic tension over the course of the show; the show's ending would be them going on their first date. However, the producers became worried that this would be compared to Sam and Diane's relationship on Cheers, so they backed away from it.

At the end of season four, Nancy Travis was introduced for a short arc playing Chris, Becker's new neighbor. Chris was a cheerful and optimistic character, the opposite of Becker, and would serve as a rival for Reggie. The season ended with a cliffhanger as Reggie kissed Becker and then left. However, Farrell was dropped at the end of season four, which came as a shock to her. Creator and executive producer David Hackel and Farrell have both stated that it had nothing to do with Farrell supporting the cast in a lawsuit and walkout for a promised pay raise after season three. Hackel said that Chris and Becker's relationship would "shake things up a bit", which the network wanted, and that, instead of having Reggie do the usual thing and return to patch things up, she would just decide to leave.

== Syndication ==
The show was offered in syndication between 2003 and 2004 after its network run on CBS ended. In the United States, the show aired on WGN America (now NewsNation) until 2010. ReelzChannel added the show in fall 2010. As of 2026, Becker currently airs on Antenna TV weeknights at 12:00 and 12:30 a.m. EST, Rewind TV weekdays at 4:00 and 4:30 p.m. EST and Sundays from 10:00 p.m.-12:00 a.m. EST, and is currently streaming on Pluto TV.

In Australia, Becker was originally broadcast on Network Ten. Reruns of the series have been aired weekdays on Foxtel's pay TV network 111 funny and Network Ten's digital channel 10 Peach Comedy.

== Home media ==
CBS DVD (distributed by Paramount) has released all six seasons of Becker on DVD in Region 1. Seasons 4-6 are Manufacture-on-Demand (MOD) releases, available exclusively via Amazon.com's CreateSpace program.

On June 6, 2017, CBS DVD released Becker: The Complete Series on DVD in Region 1.

In Region 2, Paramount Home Entertainment released the first season on DVD on April 28, 2008. There were issues with the discs that meant audio and video were out of sync.

In Region 4, Paramount Home Entertainment released the first three seasons on DVD in 2008/2009. In 2013, Umbrella Entertainment acquired the rights to the series and subsequently re-released the first three seasons. Season 4 was released on February 5, 2014. Season 5 and 6 were released in August 2016.

DVD name	Ep#	Originally aired	Release dates	
DVD name	Ep#	Originally aired	Region 1	Region 4
The First Season	22	1998–1999	April 1, 2008	May 1, 2013
The Second Season	24	1999–2000	February 3, 2009	July 3, 2013
The Third Season	24	2000–2001	January 12, 2010	November 6, 2013
The Fourth Season	24	2001–2002	July 3, 2012	February 5, 2014
The Fifth Season	22	2002–2003	June 11, 2013	August 3, 2016
The Sixth Season	13	2003–2004	December 17, 2014	August 3, 2016
The Complete Series	129	1998–2004	June 6, 2017	December 2, 2020

== Reception ==
Becker debuted as part of CBS's highly rated Monday night lineup as a midseason replacement for the canceled sitcom The Brian Benben Show, taking over the timeslot at 9:30 PM Eastern time. The show performed well for its first four seasons, piggybacking off the ratings of its lead-in, Everybody Loves Raymond; during those seasons, Becker ranked in the top 20 and peaked at #13.

Despite the ratings wins, CBS decided to try to find a new home for Becker and relocated the sitcom to lead off its Sunday night lineup. Ratings unexpectedly fell as Becker dropped out of the top 50, and CBS was set to cancel the series. CBS relented and gave Becker a sixth and final season, but was willing to order only thirteen episodes and intended to air it as a midseason replacement. Once again, CBS changed its decision last-minute; the final season launched in the fall. Moved to Wednesday nights and aired in tandem with former Monday staple The King of Queens, the 129th and final episode of Becker was broadcast on January 28, 2004.

=== Nielsen ratings ===
Season	Episodes	Timeslot (ET)	Season premiere	Season finale	Rank	Viewers (in millions)
1998–1999	22	Monday 9:30	November 2, 1998	May 17, 1999	#18	13.9
1999–2000	24	Monday 9:30	September 20, 1999	May 22, 2000	#19	15.26
2000–2001	24	Monday 9:30	October 9, 2000	May 24, 2001	#16	16.1
2001–2002	24	Monday 9:30	October 1, 2001	May 20, 2002	#13	16.3
2002–2003	22	Sunday 8:00 (Episodes 1–14, 21) Sunday 8:30 (Episodes 15–20, 22)	October 6, 2002	April 20, 2003	#51	10.43
2003–2004	13	Wednesday 9:30	October 8, 2003	January 28, 2004	#46	10.29

== See also ==
- List of Becker episodes
- Doc Martin, a 2004 British medical comedy television series, from a 2000 comedy film
