= Watching Ellie =

- Genre: Sitcom
- Created by: Brad Hall
- Starring: Julia Louis-Dreyfus; Steve Carell; Don Lake; Lauren Bowles; Peter Stormare; Darren Boyd
- Composer: Oscar Castro-Neves
- Country of origin: United States
- Original language: English
- No. of seasons: 2
- No. of episodes: 19 (3 unaired)

Production
- Executive producer: Brad Hall
- Producers: Julia Louis-Dreyfus; Matt Nodella; Jack Burditt
- Camera setup: Single-camera (season 1); Multi-camera (season 2)
- Running time: 30 minutes
- Production companies: Hammond's Reef Productions; NBC Studios

Original release
- Network: NBC
- Release: February 26, 2002 – May 20, 2003

Watching Ellie is an American television sitcom that stars Julia Louis-Dreyfus and was created by her husband, Brad Hall and aired on NBC from February 26, 2002, to May 20, 2003. Sixteen episodes were broadcast before it was canceled due to low ratings, the show received mixed reviews.

== Premise and formats ==
There were two incarnations of Watching Ellie. Both focused on the character of cabaret singer Ellie Riggs (Louis-Dreyfus), with markedly different approaches.

The first was directed by Ken Kwapis, known for his innovative work in single-camera sitcoms such as The Larry Sanders Show, Malcolm in the Middle and The Bernie Mac Show. Each 22-minute episode was meant to portray a 22-minute slice of Ellie's life, in real time. In the earliest episodes, a clock was even shown in the corner of the screen. Louis-Dreyfus stated in 2003 that the clock was Jeff Zucker's idea. Thirteen episodes were filmed, but only ten aired before the series was put on indefinite hiatus (the remaining first-season episodes have never aired).

Nearly a full year later, the show reappeared as a more traditional sitcom, with multiple cameras and a live studio audience plus an added laugh track. This version fared even worse than its predecessor and was canceled after six episodes.

== Cast ==
- Julia Louis-Dreyfus as Ellie Riggs
- Lauren Bowles as Susan
- Steve Carell as Edgar
- Darren Boyd as Ben
- Peter Stormare as Ingvar
- Don Lake as Dr. Zimmerman

== Production ==
Louis-Dreyfus and Hall earned salaries of $350,000 each per episode and their contracts stipulated 15 episodes per season, rather than the usual 22. Carsey-Werner-Mandabach Productions, the original production company, dropped out because of the high costs and was replaced by NBC Studios.

The show was pitched to ABC, CBS, Fox and HBO, who all turned down the series.

Louis-Dreyfus and Bowles played sisters and they are also half-sisters in real life.

== Episodes ==
Season	Episodes	Originally released		Rank	Average viewership (in millions)
Season	Episodes	First released	Last released	Rank	Average viewership (in millions)
1	13	February 26, 2002	May 9, 2002	55	10.0
2	6	April 15, 2003	May 20, 2003	79	8.6

=== Season 1 (2002) ===
No. overall	No. in season	Title	Directed by	Written by	Original release date	Prod. code	US viewers (millions)
1	1	"Pilot"	Ken Kwapis	Brad Hall	February 26, 2002	WE101	16.71
2	2	"Wedding"	Ken Kwapis	Brad Hall	March 5, 2002	WE102	12.03
3	3	"Dinner Party"	Ken Kwapis	Brad Hall	March 12, 2002	WE103	11.07
4	4	"Aftershocks"	Michael Lehmann	Jack Burditt	March 19, 2002	WE104	9.50
5	5	"Cheetos"	Michael Engler	Story by : Andrew Gottlieb & Brad Hall; Teleplay by : Brad Hall	March 26, 2002	WE105	9.70
6	6	"Tango"	Michael Engler	Andrew Gottlieb	April 2, 2002	WE107	9.55
7	7	"Gift"	Kevin Rodney Sullivan	Joe Furey	April 2, 2002	WE106	10.15
8	8	"Medicated"	Craig Zisk	Story by : Jeffrey Ross; Teleplay by : Joe Furey	April 9, 2002	WE109	7.48
9	9	"Weekend"	Howard Deutch	Andrew Gottlieb	April 16, 2002	WE108	7.61
10	10	"Zimmerman"	Allison Liddi-Brown	Mike Armstrong	April 23, 2002	WE110	6.90
11	11	"Dream"	N/A	N/A	Unaired	WE111	N/A
12	12	"Junk"	N/A	N/A	Unaired	WE112	N/A
13	13	"Drive"	N/A	N/A	Unaired	WE113	N/A

=== Season 2 (2003) ===
No. overall	No. in season	Title	Directed by	Written by	Original release date	Prod. code	US viewers (millions)
14	1	"Shrink"	Robert Berlinger	Brad Hall & Andrew Gottlieb	April 15, 2003	WE203	9.76
15	2	"TV"	Craig Zisk	Andrew Gottlieb	April 22, 2003	WE205	7.35
16	3	"Date"	Craig Zisk	Brad Hall & Joe Furey	April 29, 2003	WE204	8.68
17	4	"Buskers"	Kevin Rodney Sullivan	Brad Hall & Andrew Gottlieb	May 6, 2003	WE202	8.29
18	5	"Fruit Shots"	Andy Ackerman	Brad Hall & Andrew Gottlieb	May 13, 2003	WE201	7.44
19	6	"Feud"	Craig Zisk	Brad Hall	May 20, 2003	WE206	8.40
