= NewsRadio =

American television sitcom (1995–1999)

- Genre: Sitcom; Slapstick; Surreal humor
- Created by: Paul Simms
- Starring: Dave Foley; Stephen Root; Andy Dick; Maura Tierney; Vicki Lewis; Joe Rogan; Khandi Alexander; Phil Hartman; Jon Lovitz
- Theme music composer: Mike Post
- Composer: Ian Dye
- Country of origin: United States
- Original language: English
- No. of seasons: 5
- No. of episodes: 97 (list of episodes)

Production
- Executive producers: Paul Simms; Bernie Brillstein; Brad Grey; Joe Furey; Josh Lieb
- Producers: Kell Cahoon; Tom Saunders; Barbara Dorio; Mark Grossan; Kent Zbornak
- Camera setup: Multi-camera
- Running time: 30 minutes
- Production companies: Brillstein-Grey Communications (1995–1998) (seasons 1–4); Brillstein-Grey Entertainment (1998–1999) (season 5); 343 Incorporated Columbia Pictures Television (1995–1998) (seasons 1–4); Columbia TriStar Television (1998–1999) (season 5)

Original release
- Network: NBC
- Release: March 21, 1995 – May 4, 1999

NewsRadio is an American television sitcom that aired on NBC from March 21, 1995, to May 4, 1999, focusing on the work lives of the staff of a New York City AM news radio station. It had an ensemble cast featuring Dave Foley, Stephen Root, Andy Dick, Maura Tierney, Vicki Lewis, Joe Rogan, Khandi Alexander, and Phil Hartman in his final regular role before his death in 1998; Jon Lovitz joined the show after Hartman's death.

The series was created by executive producer Paul Simms and was filmed in front of a studio audience at CBS Studio Center and Sunset Gower Studios. The theme song was composed by Mike Post, who also scored the pilot.

== Overview ==
NewsRadio debuted on Tuesday, March 21, 1995. It took over the time slot of the short-lived Something Wilder, between popular series Wings and Frasier. However, during its run, its time slot changed eleven times.

The series is set at WNYX, a fictional AM broadcasting all-news radio station in New York City, populated by an eccentric station owner and staff. The show begins with the arrival of new news director Dave Nelson (Dave Foley). While Dave turns out to be more experienced than his youthful appearance suggests, he never fully gains control of his staff.

The scripts and ensemble cast combined physical humor and visual gags with quick-witted dialogue and farcical storylines. Plots often involved satirical takes on historical events, news stories, and pop culture references. The third and fourth season finales took the surrealism to the extreme, setting the characters in outer space and aboard the Titanic, respectively.

Khandi Alexander left the series in the fourth season, after the seventh episode, with her character leaving for a job overseas. During the production hiatus between the fourth and fifth seasons, Phil Hartman was killed by his wife Brynn. In the first episode of the fifth season, his character has just died of a heart attack, and is mourned by the characters, with a return appearance by Alexander. In the next episode, Hartman's friend Jon Lovitz joined the cast, playing a character hired to replace Hartman's. When asked why he joined NewsRadio, Lovitz stated that show creator Paul Simms told him, "I don't know what to tell you. You're his friend. It feels right. Everybody in the cast wants you."

There are a total of 97 episodes. Reruns continued in syndication for several years before disappearing in most markets. However, the show has aired on A&E, Nick at Nite, and TBS in the United States, and DTour and the Comedy Network in Canada. In the United States, the show occasionally airs as a filler on WGN America and runs regularly on Reelz, Antenna TV, and Rewind TV. For several years starting in July 2007, the program was syndicated through The Program Exchange.

== Episodes ==
Season	Episodes	Originally released	
Season	Episodes	First released	Last released
1	7	March 21, 1995	May 9, 1995
2	21	September 19, 1995	April 28, 1996
3	25	September 18, 1996	June 5, 1997
4	22	September 23, 1997	May 12, 1998
5	22	September 23, 1998	May 4, 1999

== Characters ==
=== Main ===
The cast of NewsRadio, Seasons 1 to 4

- Dave Nelson (Dave Foley) is WNYX's new news director, described as a "Midwesterner out of place in New York and pointedly young for such a responsible job". He was born in Canada but raised in Wisconsin. He has a friendly, but cautious and easily flustered personality, which contrasts with the more lively personalities of the other characters, and the farcical situations that occur on the show. Dave has a number of peculiar talents, including tap dancing, a cappella singing, knife throwing, and ventriloquism. He is close with his mother, frequently talking to her on the phone and keeping a picture of her on his desk. He has an overwhelming coffee addiction, as well as a strong passion for television and classic sitcoms, particularly Green Acres and Mister Ed.
- Jimmy James (Stephen Root) is the station's eccentric, playful billionaire owner. His name comes from the Beastie Boys song "Jimmy James". Despite owning a vast corporate empire, he enjoys micromanaging WNYX. He acts as a father figure toward his employees, offering them life lessons of dubious value. Recurring gags include his impersonal search for a wife, his infatuation with Dave's mother, his inability to lie convincingly, his rivalries with other wealthy entrepreneurs (such as Ted Turner and Bill Gates), and his considerable inside knowledge of conspiracies and government cover-ups. In the series finale, he "retires" to New Hampshire, where he buys a news radio station and newspaper, taking most of the WNYX staff with him.
- Matthew Brock (Andy Dick) is a news reporter. Clumsy and immature, he is the butt of many physical jokes on the show, including pratfalls and handling electronics that explode or catch fire. Matthew idolizes Bill McNeal, who bullies him in return. Later in the series, he displays an affinity for science fiction and fantasy media. Matthew holds a degree in dentistry, but prefers radio journalism, despite being inept at it. He develops a crush on Lisa. He initially dislikes Max, seeing him as an interloper taking his place as Bill's rightful successor, but eventually grows to like him.
- Lisa Miller (Maura Tierney), with whom Dave has an intermittent relationship, serves as reporter, on-air personality, producer, and news director briefly in the series. An obsessive overachiever, Lisa can instantly perform complex mathematical calculations and keeps a detailed life-plan. She frequently brags about her SAT scores and retakes the exam well out of college. She gets turned on if she yells too much. Lisa was born in Boston, living there until the age of seven when her family moved to Connecticut. She represses a working-class Boston accent, which results in her having a sibilant "S" while speaking. During the first two seasons of the show, she is in regular contact with her ex-boyfriend Stuart, with the suggestion that they might still be in love. In season five, she marries Jimmy's archenemy Johnny Johnson (played by Patrick Warburton).
- Beth (Vicki Lewis) is Dave's secretary. She wears ridiculous, often midriff-baring outfits, has bright red hair, and chews gum. Her salary is often the subject of jokes; characters frequently point out that she "earns next to nothing". Her first name comes from the Kiss song "Beth", and she claims that she does not have a last name. In the third season DVD commentary, the writers revealed they had planned to have Jimmy adopt Beth as his daughter, but felt there was never a right time for it.
- Joe Garrelli (Joe Rogan) is the station's street-smart electrician and handyman. He is notorious for his seemingly nonchalant approach to his profession. Believing that consumer products are "rip-offs", he is known to personally craft his own supplies (such as homemade duct tape) and gadgets for others around the office (among many a stun gun, a white noise machine, and a two-way radio). He also espouses various conspiracy theories, particularly with regard to the government's suppression of information about extraterrestrial life. Throughout the series, he displays an infatuation with Catherine Duke. On several occasions, Joe’s coworkers speculate he might have been the then-unidentified Unabomber. The station handyman character was played by Greg Lee in the pilot episode. Ray Romano was also considered for the role but replaced because his comedic style was judged a mismatch with the other cast members.
- Catherine Duke (Khandi Alexander) is the second of WNYX's news anchors. She is often a bitter rival of co-anchor Bill McNeal; according to Bill, this is partly due to an office affair they had years earlier. When she was younger she worked with her uncle and learned how to perform and identify numerous scams, such as Three-card Monte. She is well known for slapping her co-workers in the event words do not express her contempt for a certain situation. Catherine is noted for being direct with people, though she is willing to use her charms to get her way. Catherine leaves the station to take a job in London during the fourth season. She makes a brief appearance in the fifth-season premiere for Bill's funeral. The role of Catherine was played by Ella Joyce in the pilot episode.
- Evelyn William "Bill" McNeal (Phil Hartman) is a news co-anchor for WNYX. Loud, arrogant, and free-spirited, Bill is frequently a thorn in the news director's side. Bill was the breakout character. His relationships are often unorthodox or contentious. He often displays jarring gaps in knowledge. Another running joke in the show has Bill describing painful stories with an air of cheerful nostalgia, often wistfully saying, "good times, good times". Bill occasionally shows flashes of concern and wisdom for his co-workers, whom he perceives as friends. An issue of Radio Ink magazine displaying Hartman on its cover was displayed in Dave's office as a tribute to the actor and character following his death. Bill is shown reading from said issue in the season four episode “Who’s the Boss?”
- Max Louis (Jon Lovitz) is Bill McNeal's replacement in season five. He is socially awkward, neurotic and terrible at his job. Max has a penchant for redheads, and Beth in particular, but she quickly despises him. He says that Max Louis is not his true identity, because he uses a different persona every time he gets a new job. Max gets the job at WNYX because he is an old colleague of Bill's, a plot point that reflects the real-life fact that Jon Lovitz took the role in NewsRadio out of friendship with Phil Hartman. Lovitz first appeared on "Our Fiftieth Episode" when Bill meets him in a mental ward going by the name Fred. Fred later admits he is really an air traffic controller who periodically and voluntarily "flips out" and goes into the mental ward for a vacation from making decisions. Lovitz returned a second time in the fourth season opener "Jumper". In the episode, Lovitz plays Mike Johnson, a disgruntled former employee who has been fired and is threatening to commit suicide by jumping from the ledge outside Dave's office.

=== Recurring ===
The only recurring character to appear in more than one production season is that of Jimmy's lawyer, Roger, played initially by Norm Macdonald, and later by NewsRadio writer Drake Sather, who did a vocal impersonation of Macdonald.

Several other actors appeared in multiple seasons playing different characters, notably Lovitz, David Cross, Toby Huss, Brian Posehn, David Anthony Higgins, Dave Allen, Wallace Langham, and Bob Odenkirk.

Tone Lōc and Toby Huss played security guards Lorenzo and Junior in two episodes in season 2. The characters were based on the security guards at the studio where NewsRadio was shot. During the last season, Patrick Warburton had a recurring role as Johnny Johnson, Jimmy's nemesis and Lisa's love interest (and eventual husband).

Lauren Graham had a four-episode run as Andrea, a manipulative efficiency expert who shakes up the office (firing Matthew, demoting Dave, and promoting Lisa). She is sometimes referred to as "Planbee" after Matthew misunderstands her being Jimmy's "Plan B" for the office. In a season 4 episode commentary track, Tierney gives the hiring of Graham as a possible explanation for Alexander's departure, which contradicts the idea that Alexander intended to leave before Graham appeared on the show (In Dave Foley's appearance on Joe Rogan's podcast, they talked about Alexander leaving because she was not given enough lines). All of the changes introduced during Graham's time on the show would be restored by mid-season to the way things were before her arrival.

Brad Rowe had a four-episode run as Walt the intern, Jimmy's nephew who has a crush on Lisa, which causes more worry for Dave.

== Home media ==
Sony Pictures Home Entertainment released all five seasons of NewsRadio on DVD in Region 1 between 2005 and 2007. Each set includes multiple audio commentaries with creator Paul Simms, the writers and actors. The DVD sets also include special features such as gag reels and other featurettes.

On August 27, 2013, it was announced that Mill Creek Entertainment had acquired the rights to various television series from the Sony Pictures library, including NewsRadio. They subsequently re-released the first two seasons on DVD on April 1, 2014.

On May 19, 2015, Mill Creek Entertainment re-released NewsRadio – The Complete Series on DVD in Region 1.

DVD name	# ep.	Release date
The Complete First and Second Seasons	28	May 24, 2005 (re-release: April 1, 2014)
The Complete Third Season	25	February 28, 2006
The Complete Fourth Season	22	June 20, 2006
The Complete Fifth Season	22	March 20, 2007
The Complete Series	97	October 28, 2008 (re-release: May 19, 2015)

== Nielsen ratings ==
On its first two broadcasts, the show received a 20 share, improving on its lead-in (Wings) by a percentage point, and beating its competitors (Under One Roof and Thunder Alley) in its share of the 18- to 49-year-old audience.

=== Season ratings ===
Season	TV season	Time slot (ET)	Ratings rank	Viewers (in millions)
1	1995	Tuesday at 8:30 pm	#39	11.4
2	1995–1996	Tuesday at 8:30 pm (episodes 1–10); Sunday at 8:30 pm (episodes 11–21)	#39	10.6
3	1996–1997	Wednesday at 9:00 pm (episodes 1–10, 12–17); Thursday at 8:30 pm (episodes 11, 25); Wednesday at 8:00 pm (episodes 18–21, 23 & 24); Wednesday at 8:30 pm (episode 22)	#92	7.0
4	1997–1998	Tuesday at 8:30 pm (episodes 1–8, 10–15, 22); Thursday at 8:30 pm (episode 9); Wednesday at 8:00 pm (episodes 16–21)	#62	8.0
5	1998–1999	Wednesday at 9:30 pm (episodes 1–7, 9); Tuesday at 8:30 pm (episodes 8, 10–22)	#77	9.6
