= Post Road (disambiguation) =

A post road is a road designated for the transportation of postal mail. Post Road may also refer to:

- Post Road (magazine), a literary magazine published by Boston College
- Post Road Branch, a railroad line
- Post Road (play), a 1934 Broadway play by Wilbur Daniel Steele and Norma Mitchell
