= Anne Sargent =

American actress (1923–2007)

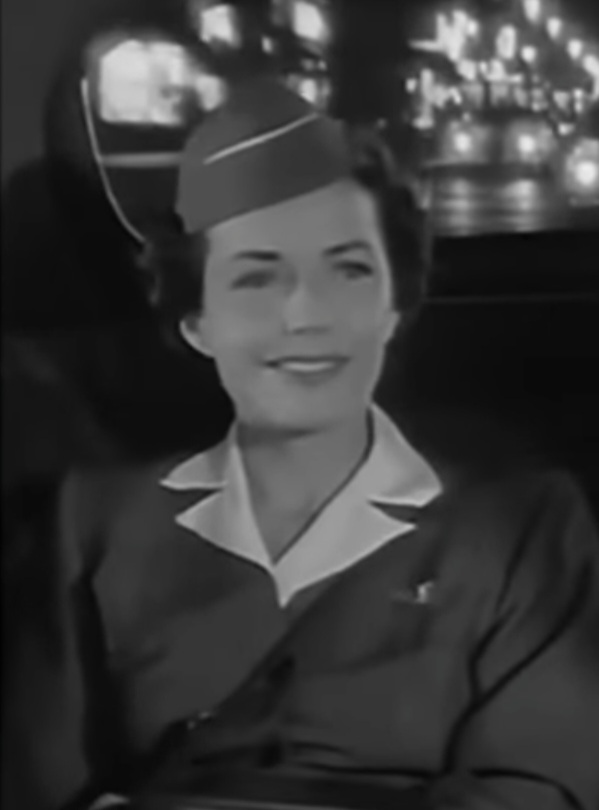
- Sargent in Three Guys Named Mike (1951)
- Born: Helen W. Thomas; November 18, 1923; West Pittston, Pennsylvania, U.S.
- Died: July 23, 2007 (aged 83); Englewood Hospital, Englewood, New Jersey, U.S.
- Occupation: Actress
- Years active: 1948–1965
- Spouses: Edmon Ryan (m. 1950; div. 1967); Paul McGrath (died 1978)
- Children: 1

Anne Sargent (born Helen W. Thomas; November 18, 1923 – July 23, 2007) was a film and stage actress from West Pittston, Pennsylvania, who performed in theater under the direction of Alfred Lunt, in 1948–1950. She is perhaps best known for her role as Mrs. Halloran in the 1948 motion picture The Naked City.

== Career ==
In March 1949 Sargent was featured in a production of I Know My Love at the Biltmore Theatre, in Los Angeles, California, which starred Alfred Lunt and Lynn Fontanne. In July 1950, she was signed by Metro Goldwyn Mayer to act in Three Guys Named Mike.

On television, she appeared, in among other series, on Perry Mason in 1958 as Eileen Harrison, wife of the title character, in "The Case of the Married Moonlighter". She appeared in the Bewitched episode "A Strange Little Visitor", which was her last known acting credit.

== Personal life ==
Sargent's first marriage was to Edmon Ryan, an actor with Warner Brothers. Sargent accompanied her second husband, Paul McGrath, to England in 1978. McGrath, the voice of Inner Sanctum Mysteries in the 1940s and early 1950s, died in his sleep while the couple were staying in London, England.

Sargent's daughter with Ryan is actress Hilary Shelton Ryan (born 1955, London), who studied at the Tudor Hall School near Banbury, England.
