= Nancy Malone =

American actress and director (1935–2014)

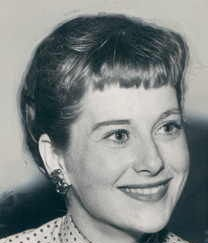
- Born: Ann Josefa Maloney; March 19, 1935; Queens Village, Queens
- Died: May 8, 2014 (aged 79); Duarte, California, U.S.
- Occupations: Actress, director and producer
- Years active: 1950–2003

Nancy Malone (born Ann Josefa Maloney; March 19, 1935 – May 8, 2014) was an American television actress from the 1950s to 1970s, who later moved into producing and directing in the 1980s and 1990s.

== Early life and career ==
Born in Queens Village, New York City, Malone was one of at least three children born to longshoreman James Maloney and Winnifred Shields, an Irish immigrant from Crossmaglen, County Armagh. Her mother gave her the middle name, Josefa, because her birthday happened to fall on March 19, Saint Joseph's Day. The 1930-1940 census records show she had two older brothers, Roger C(harles) and James F(rancis).

Malone first achieved fame as a child model working with the John Robert Powers Agency, most notably on November 25, 1946, when, at age 11, she appeared on the cover of Life magazine's 10th anniversary issue.

== Television ==
Malone appeared in a number of programs in the early days of television, including I Remember Mama, Robert Montgomery Presents, and Suspense. She played Libby on the television series Naked City from 1960 to 1963. During the same period, she played Robin Lang Bowden Fletcher on the daytime soap opera Guiding Light. She guest-starred as Kathy in a 1963 episode of 77 Sunset Strip, "Deposit with Caution". She subsequently played Clara Varner on the television series The Long Hot Summer, which ran for one season on ABC, and appeared in The Outer Limits episode "Fun and Games" and The Twilight Zone episode "Stopover in a Quiet Town".

She guest-starred alongside Robert Redford in an episode of Route 66 entitled "First Class Mouliak". In 1967, she appeared in an episode of the western Bonanza as Katherine Rowen ("The Unseen Wound"). She also guest-starred in one 1968 episode of The Big Valley, "The Secret". That same year she portrayed Dr. Edith Gibson, the love interest of Goober Pyle (George Lindsey), on the next-to-the-last original episode of the television series The Andy Griffith Show, "A Girl for Goober". In 1968 she also appeared as Steve McGarrett's sister in the Hawaii Five O episode "Once Upon a Time". Later, in 1971, she performed the role of Cathleen, Rueben Kincaid's love interest, in episode 20 of The Partridge Family, "They Shoot Managers Don't They?" She also worked behind the camera as a Producer for The Bionic Woman and as a Director for episodes of Melrose Place and Diagnosis: Murder.

== Stage ==
Malone debuted on Broadway in Time Out for Ginger.

== Entertainment business ==
In 1976, she became the first female vice-president of television at 20th Century Fox.

== Awards ==
Malone in 1977 was awarded one of the first Crystal Awards by Women in Film for outstanding women who, through their endurance and the excellence of their work, have helped to expand the role of women within the entertainment industry. Later, in 1991 and 1992, she was nominated for Emmy Awards for directing episodes of the television series Sisters and The Trials of Rosie O'Neill. She finally won the award in 1993 for producing the televised retrospective Bob Hope: The First 90 Years. She was also a lifetime member of The Actors Studio, as well as a board member for The Alliance of Women Directors, composed of female directors who are alumnae of the American Film Institute's Directing Workshop for Women.

== Hobbies ==
Malone was a painter and a poet, and she enjoyed playing football and baseball.

== Death ==
She died of pneumonia while battling leukemia on May 8, 2014, aged 79.

== Filmography as director ==
- The Guardian (TV series)
- Resurrection Blvd (TV series)
- Judging Amy (TV series)
- I Married a Monster (1998; TV movie)
- The Fugitive (TV series)
- Star Trek: Voyager (TV series)
- Fame L.A. (TV series)
- Home Song (1996; TV movie)
- Central Park West (TV Series)
- Touched by an Angel (1994; TV series)
- Diagnosis: Murder (1993; TV series)
- Melrose Place (1992; TV series)
- The Trials of Rosie O'Neill (TV series)
- Sisters (1991; TV series)
- Beverly Hills, 90210 (TV series)
- Hotel (1983; TV series)
- Dynasty (1981; TV series)
- Merlene of the Movies (1981; director)
- Knots Landing (1979; TV series)
- The Bionic Woman (1977; producer for two episodes)
