= Phyllis Povah =

American actress (1893–1975)

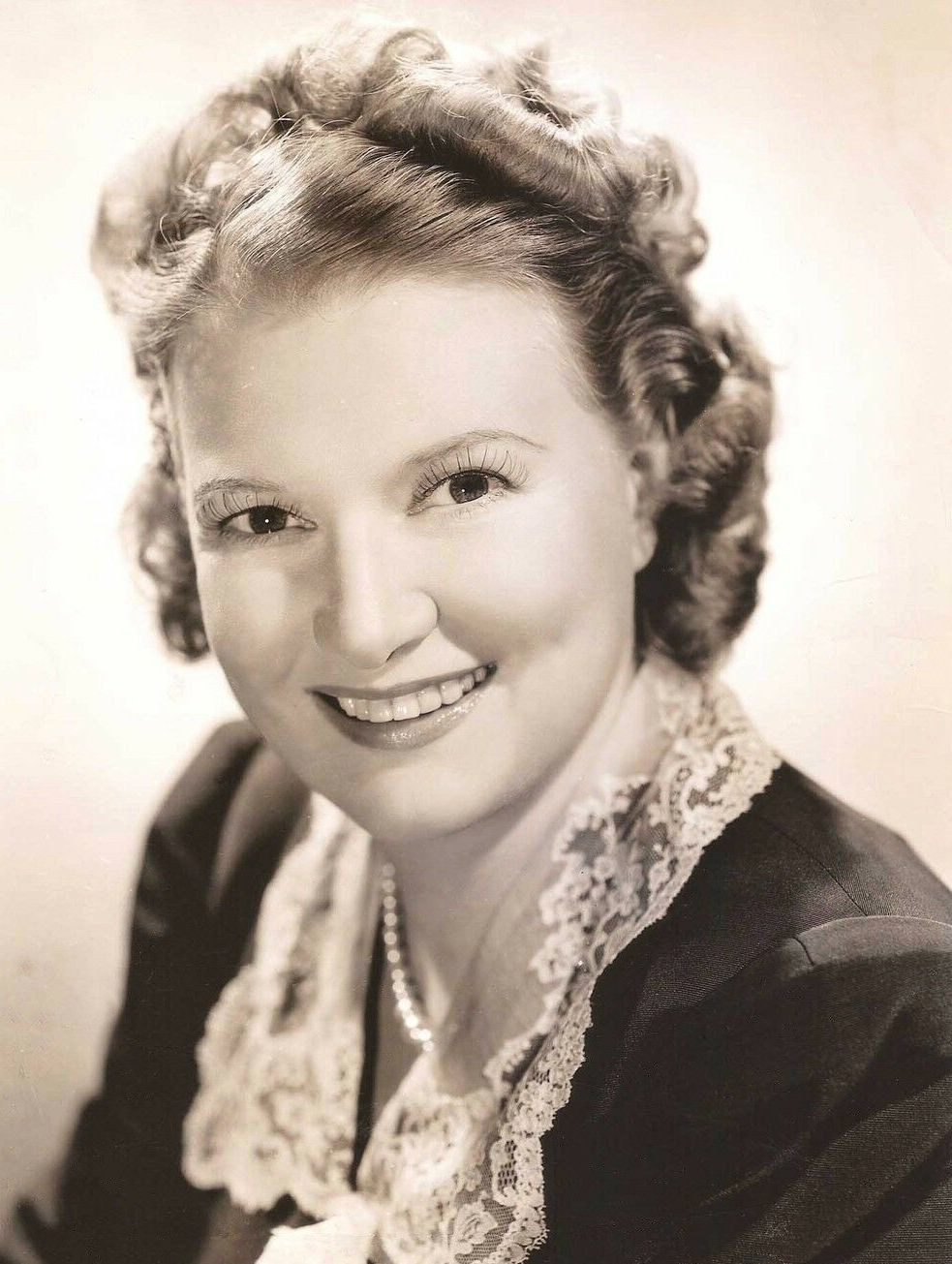
- Povah in 1939
- Born: July 21, 1893; Detroit, Michigan, U.S.
- Died: August 7, 1975 (aged 82); Port Washington, New York, U.S.
- Resting place: Nassau Knolls Cemetery
- Occupation: Actress
- Years active: 1921–1959
- Spouse: Henry E. Drayton (m. 1930)
- Children: 2

Phyllis Povah (July 21, 1893 – August 7, 1975) was an American stage and film actress.

== Career ==
Povah made her Broadway theatre debut in Mr. Pim Passes By in 1921 and acted in minor roles in several productions over the next two decades as well as one of the leads in the 1923 play Icebound. She achieved a notable success in a featured role in the stage production of The Women, and the play ran for 18 months, from 1936 until 1938. When a film version was planned, Povah and Marjorie Main were the only members of the cast who were chosen to reprise their roles in the film which was released in 1939. (The film was directed by George Cukor).

The film was a success, but Povah continued to work steadily in theatre, and appeared in the film Let's Face It (1943) with Bob Hope and Betty Hutton. Dear Ruth, in which Povah starred with John Dall and Virginia Gilmore played on Broadway from 1944 until 1946, and provided her with a substantial role and her biggest success during the 1940s. She made two films in 1952, The Marrying Kind with Judy Holliday and Aldo Ray, and Pat and Mike with Spencer Tracy and Katharine Hepburn, both directed by George Cukor.

Her final Broadway role was in Anniversary Waltz with MacDonald Carey and Kitty Carlisle in 1954 and 1955. The film version, retitled Happy Anniversary (1959) and costarring David Niven and Mitzi Gaynor, was her final film.

== Death ==
She died from a heart attack in Port Washington, New York, aged 82. Her cremains are buried at Nassau Knolls Cemetery in Port Washington, New York.

== Filmography ==
- The Women (1939)
- Let's Face It (1943)
- The Marrying Kind (1952)
- Pat and Mike (1952)
- Happy Anniversary (1959)
