= Guiding Light (1960–1969) =

American television soap opera

The Guiding Light (GL) (known since 1975 as Guiding Light) is a long-running American television soap opera. In the 1960s, it became the first daytime television series to discuss contemporary social issues, starting in 1961 with a storyline about uterine cancer.

== Show development ==
As part of her "relevance" campaign, Agnes Nixon wanted to see social issues worked into the plot, and set the tone for much of the material used during the 1960s. One story, which involved Bert's battle with uterine cancer gave many female viewers the incentive to see their gynecologists.

In 1965, Nixon became the headwriter of NBC's Another World, at the behest of her mentor, Irna Phillips, who created both GL and AW, but remained at GL for another year.

On March 13, 1967, the show was first broadcast in color. On September 9, 1968, the show expanded from 15 to 30 minutes as did CBS' then other 15 minute daytime drama, Search for Tomorrow. Following the industry trend, the show also switched from broadcasting live to pre-taping in 1968.

== Major characters ==
The Bauers

- Papa Bauer (Theo Goetz until end of decade)
- Meta Bauer Banning (Ellen Demming until June 16, 1966 and December 25, 1967 to January 2, 1968 and July 22, 1969 to end of decade)
- Bill Bauer (Ed Bryce until September 28, 1962, and then February 23, 1965 until July 16, 1969; Eugene H. Smith, October 19, 1964 to January 27, 1965), character presumed deceased.
- Bert Bauer (Charita Bauer until end of decade)
- Mike Bauer (Michael Allen until October 2, 1961; Paul Prokop, December 22, 1961 to March 13, 1963; Gary Francis Pillar (later Carpenter), March 27, 1963 to October 1, 1965, Pilar also appeared on Another World as Mike Bauer from February 7, 1966, to February 2, 1967; Robert Pickering, April 18, 1968, to November 29, 1968; Don Stewart, December 11, 1968, until end of decade), character SORASed.
- Dr. William Edward "Ed" Bauer Jr. (Pat Collins until June 15, 1960; Donald Briscoe, November 16, 1965 to November 30, 1965; Robert Gentry, December 17, 1965, to May 30, 1969; Mart Hulswit, June 06, 1969, until end of decade), character SORASed.
- Dr. Bruce Banning (Lester "Les" Damon until October 14, 1960; Barnard Hughes, November 21, 1960 to June 13, 1966; Sydney Walker, November 26, 1969 to end of decade)
- Julie Conrad Bauer (Sandra Smith, December 14, 1961 to March 31, 1965), Mike's first legal wife, character committed suicide, off-camera, in January 1966.)
- Hope Bauer (Jennifer Kirschner, October 2, 1963, to October 5, 1965; Elisa Leeds played Hope on Another World from March 25, 1966, to June 30, 1966, and then again from August 16, 1968 until end of decade; Paula Schwartz, March 18, 1968 to July 5, 1968), Mike and Julie's daughter, character born on screen on October 2, 1963.
- Leslie Jackson Bauer (Lynne Adams, March 16, 1966 until end of decade), Ed's first wife.

The Fletchers, Benedicts and Scotts

- Dr. Paul Fletcher (Bernard Grant until end of decade)
- Anne Benedict Fletcher (Joan Gray until October 19, 1961; Elizabeth Hubbard, November 8, 1961 to October 23, 1962), Paul's first wife, character killed off.
- Henry Benedict (John Boruff, June 14, 1961 to December 29, 1965; Lester Rawlins, May 26, 1966 to June 14, 1966; Paul McGrath, March 23 to April 20, 1967), Anne's father, character written out.
- Helene Benedict (Kay Campbell, June 12, 1961 to November 25, 1964), Anne's mother, character killed off, off-screen in July 1965.
- Dr. John "Johnny" Fletcher (Sheldon Golomb, December 25, 1962 to June 25, 1963; Donald Melvin, August 8, 1963 to September 18, 1964; Daniel Fortas, May 21, 1965, to June 18, 1965; Don Scardino, October 7, 1965 to June 5, 1967; Erik Howell, June 12, 1967 until end of decade), Paul and Anne's SORASed son.
- Jane Fletcher Hayes (Pamela King, April 6, 1962 to May 14, 1963; Hilda Brawner, June 3, 1963 to October 1, 1963; Chase Crosley, October 8, 1963 to February 5, 1968), Paul's younger half-sister; character written out.
- Robin Lang Holden Bowden Fletcher (Judy Robinson until October 19, 1960; Abigail Kellogg, October 31, 1960 to October 1961; Nancy Malone, October 1961 to May 30, 1963; Ellen Weston, July 24, 1963 to July 3, 1964; Gillian Spencer, July 27, 1964, to October 4, 1967), was married and her marriage annulled to Mike Bauer in 1961. In 1964, Robin became Paul Fletcher's second wife. The character was killed off in 1967.
- Margaret "Maggie" Scott (June Graham, March 10, 1965, to March 22, 1968), Bill's secretary, character killed off.
- Benjamin "Ben" Scott (Bernard Kates, June 2, 1965 to May 16, 1967), Maggie's husband, character killed off.
- Peggy Scott Dillman Fletcher (Fran Myers, May 12, 1965 until end of decade), Johnny's wife, her second marriage, Maggie and Ben's daughter.
- George Hayes (Phillip Sterling, February 28, 1961 to June 26, 1968), Jane's husband, character written out.

Other characters

- Dr. Richard "Dick" Grant Jr. (James Lipton until December 26, 1961), character written out.
- Marie Wallace Grant (Lynne Rogers until December 27, 1961), character written out.
- Mark Holden (Whitfield Connor until July 15, 1960), character written out.
- Ruth Jannings Holden (Virginia Dwyer until July 12, 1960), character written out.
- Karl Jannings (Richard Morse until July 6, 1960), character killed off.
- Joe Turino (Joseph Campanella until May 18, 1961), character written out.
- Amy Sinclair (in this decade: Connie Lembcke, July 21, 1960 to April 24, 1961), character written out.
- Phillip Collins Grant (Carson Woods, September 21, 1960 to September 22, 1961), character written out.
- Alexander "Alex" Bowden (Ernest Graves, November 9, 1960 to December 24, 1965), Robin's first legal husband and father of 1979 – 1981 character Carter Bowden, character written out.
- Lt. Carl Wyatt (Gerald Stuart O'Loughlin Jr., July 21, 1960 to February 26, 1963), Los Angeles police lieutenant, investigated Joe Turino's illegal activities and the accidental shooting death of Anne Benedict Fletcher, ceased appearing.
- Andrew Murray (Dana Elcar, January 1962 to February 26, 1963), replaced Richard Hanley as District Attorney of Los Angeles County, ceased appearing.
- Doris Crandall (Barbara Becker, March 6, 1961 to June 14, 1963), Alex's first wife and mother of 1979 – 1981 character Carter Bowden, character written out.
- Dr. Peter Nelson (Gene Rupert, October 24, 1962 – April 3, 1964), briefly dated and romanced Jane Fletcher before she married George Hayes, ceased appearing.
- Jason Weber (Marc O'Daniels, March 17 to October 15, 1965), dated Maggie Scott, character killed off in a car accident.
- Dr. Stephen Jackson (Stefan Schnabel, April 21, 1966 until end of decade), Leslie's father.
- Dr. James "Jim" Frazier (Billy Dee Williams, January 11 to September 9, 1966; James Earl Jones, October 5 to December 26, 1966), character written out.
- Martha Frazier (Cicely Tyson, July 28, 1966 to February 16, 1967; Ruby Dee, March 6 to September 26, 1967; Frances Foster, October 11, 1967 to February 13, 1968), Jim's wife, character written out.
- Dr. Joseph "Joe" Werner (Ben Hayes, May 16, 1966 to September 11, 1967; Ed Zimmerman, October 31, 1967, until end of decade)
- Jack Haskell (Paul Larson, May 5, 1966 to July 19, 1966), worked for the New York City office of the advertising agency, Carson & Associates, that Bill Bauer worked for in Springfield, acted as Bill's conscious when he visited Bill, ceased appearing.
- Dr. Sara McIntyre (Patricia Roe, March 15, 1967, until June 18, 1968; Jill Andre, July 19, 1968, to January 27, 1969; Millette Alexander, January 30, 1969, until end of decade)
- Charlotte Waring AKA Tracey Delmar (Victoria Wyndham, October 30, 1967, to end of decade; Felice Camargo, temporary replacement/body double, June 05, 1969 to June 12, 1969, 1969)
- Nurse Marion McHenry (Marion June Lauer Beniades, July 19, 1967 until end of decade)
- Martin "Marty" Dillman (Robert Lawson, January 11 to February 2, 1968; Christopher Wines, February 8 to December 16, 1968), Peggy Scott's first husband, character murdered by Flip Malone
- Cindy Gardner Brown (Darby Simpson, June 5, 1968 to December 26, 1968), a young widowed patient at Cedars treated by Dr. Joe Werner, who Joe had a brief affair with, written out.
- Flip Malone (Paul Carpinelli, February 5, 1968 to June 13, 1969), went to prison for murdering Marty Dillman.
- Claudia Dillman (Grace Matthews, January 18, 1968 to June 04, 1969), Marty's mother.
- Dr. Gavin Hamilton (Paul McGrath, September 13, 1968 to November 01, 1968), cardiologist involved in Bill Bauer's heart transplant, ceased appearing.
- Lee Gantry (Ray Fulmer, July 08, 1969 until end of decade), Sara McIntyre's first husband.
- Alice Rawlings, character talked about but not seen, killed off-camera by her husband Lee Gantry.
- Miss Mildred Foss (Jan Sterling Douglas, November 21, 1969 until end of decade), Lee Gantry's housekeeper.
- Margaret "Margie" Wexler (Margie Impert, October 22, 1969 to December 1969), character committed suicide.
- Peter Wexler (Leon Russom, February 20, 1969 to April 17, 1969; Michael Durrell, April 25, 1969 to end of decade), attorney working with Mike Bauer, Margie's husband.
- Lt. Pete Stassen (Karl Mitchell Light, December 16, 1968 to March 21, 1969), Springfield police lieutenant, ceased appearing.
- Lt. Wally Campbell (Alexander "Alex" Courtney, December 03, 1968 to January 08, 1969; Jack Ryland, January 14, 1969 to June 04, 1969;), Springfield police lieutenant, written out.
- Sgt. DeMarco (Michael Theodore Mikler, December 03, 1968 to December 18, 1968), Springfield police sergeant, written out.
- Ira Newton (Sorrell Booke, February 12, 1969 to June 05, 1969), District Attorney.
- Judge Evan Kruger (Hansford Rowe, May 09, 1969 to June 04, 1969), presided over the case of the state vs. Peggy Scott Dillman for the murder of Marty Dillman, ceased appearing.
- Judy Stassen (Ruth Manning, December 30, 1968 to February 11, 1969), Lt. Pete Stassen's wife and former love interest of Dr. Joe Werner, ceased appearing.
- Deborah (Olivia Cole, April 30, 1969 until end of decade) originally appeared with no last name.
- Tyler Meade (Paul Collins, September 16, 1969 until end of decade)
- Tom Halverson (Chris Sarandon, September 16, 1969 until end of decade)
- Janet Mason (Caroline McWilliams, April 30, 1969, until end of decade)
- Colonel Grove Mason (Vince O'Brien, June 09, 1969 until end of decade), the father of Janet.
- Ellen Mason (Jeanne Arnold, June 09, 1969 until end of decade), the mother of Janet and the wife of Grove.
- Dusty McGuire (James Donnelly, June 27, 1969 until end of decade)

== Plot development ==
Later in the decade, in 1966–1967, The Guiding Light was also the first show to regularly feature African American characters, Dr. Jim Frazier and his wife nurse Martha Frazier (played first by Billy Dee Williams and Cicely Tyson and then by James Earl Jones and Ruby Dee).

Meta Roberts marries Bruce Banning at the beginning of the decade, while the show focuses on Bill and Bert's children, Mike and Ed, in the mid-1960s. Robin Lang Holden is also a popular character during this time. By winter 1960, Mike and Robin, both seniors in high school, become closer romantically. Robin's stepbrother, Karl Jannings, also a senior, has feelings for her, but Robin's heart is set on Mike. Mike proposes to Robin in the spring of 1960, and they elope in May, much to the disapproval of their families. Karl finds out and gets into fights with Mike, escalating into a tragedy on July 4 when a drunken Karl falls and lands on his head, causing him to go into a coma. Mike is arrested but eventually acquitted of attempted murder. He feels guilty and leaves for New York City to attend Columbia University in January 1961. Meanwhile, Robin marries art dealer Alex Bowden in November 1960, but they later divorce after losing their child in a miscarriage.

Dr. Paul Fletcher runs a free clinic in a dilapidated area of Los Angeles near Selby Flats. His wife Anne and later his sister, Nurse Jane Fletcher, are opposed to his efforts especially when Doris Crandall, an alcoholic and Alex Bowden's estranged first wife, shows up as a patient after getting involved temporarily with criminal Joe Turino. In October 1962, Doris gets hold of a gun that Turino had given her for protection and threatens suicide inside the Fletcher's garage. Anne gets into a struggle with Doris, and the gun misfires, killing Anne while their son Johnny watches. This turns Johnny into a spoiled kid, with Anne's father Henry spoiling him the most, setting up a trust fund for him when he turns 18, which Paul objects to. Jane also starts doting on Johnny. Turino leaves town, and Doris returns to San Francisco.

After returning from Venezuela, Mike gets a job as a legal assistant for attorney George Hayes while finishing law school. Mike also finds himself acting as emotional support to Bert, who has found out she has uterine cancer. Due to heavy network censorship at the time, Bert's storyline plays out without using the words "uterine" or "pap smear". Bert complains of "female troubles" and goes to the hospital for "some tests", which reveal her cancer. Bert's uterine cancer storyline inspired many women to go for their own pap smears, despite never hearing those words on the screen.

Mike falls for Jane Fletcher, Paul's sister, and her roommate Julie Conrad, who is also George's secretary. Bert loves Jane but dislikes Julie. Julie taunts Mike with sexual suggestions until Jane finds out and tries to make things difficult. Julie and Mike sleep together, and she ends up pregnant. Bert forces them into a shotgun wedding and to live with her, Bill, Ed, and Papa. Julie's difficult pregnancy and delivery lead to mental instability, and Bert acts as a surrogate mother to Mike's daughter Hope. Eventually, Mike agrees with Bert, Papa, and Bill that Julie needs to be sent to a mental institution. Robin divorces Alex Bowden, moves away, and becomes involved with Dr. Paul Fletcher, causing problems with Jane. Jane eventually reforms and marries George Hayes after he saves her from a car accident. Robin and Paul get married, and Robin becomes pregnant with Paul's child.

The show's writers retroactively changed the name and location of the series from Selby Flats to Springfield, United States, without a designated state, but apparently in the Midwest. Cedars Hospital remained a central location in Springfield, first introduced via Bill Bauer opening a new office of a New York City advertising agency in the summer of 1965. Maggie Scott, his secretary at the agency, was a widow raising her teenage daughter Peggy and romantically involved with young Jason Weber. Although Peggy mentioned enjoying working at Dr. Paul Fletcher's clinic in the summer of 1965, which remained in Selby Flats, and Papa Bauer claimed to have lived in Springfield his entire life, despite earlier episodes indicating otherwise.

Mike Bauer leaves the show after graduating law school and passing The Bar in spring 1965, due to his strained marriage with Julie caused by Bert's overbearing presence. Julie later becomes mentally unstable and commits suicide in a mental facility near Oakdale in January 1966. Mike and his daughter, Hope, move to Bay City where he becomes romantically involved with Lee Carter Randolph, his boss's daughter. Despite trying to resist the attraction, Mike and Lee's stepmother, Pat, fall in love and end up kissing which leads to Lee witnessing the act. After a confrontation with Lee, Mike leaves Bay City in February 1967 with Hope and they are listed as working, going to school and living in Philadelphia during the year 1967–1968. Lee becomes involved with mechanic and later turned attorney, Samuel "Sam" Lucas, who was dealing drugs during the late 1960s, and Lee has a fatal car accident in 1969 after having her coffee spiked with LSD. Pat later gives birth to her and John's son, Michael, in the 1970s.

Ed Bauer starts his residency at Cedars Hospital in Springfield, competing with two other interns, Joe Werner and Jim Frazier, to become the new protégé of Dr. Stephen "Steve" Jackson, the Chief of Surgery. Bert is disappointed that Ed is going by "Ed" instead of "Billy", the name she had been calling him. Meanwhile, Jason Weber breaks things off with Maggie Scott in January 1966, and then dies in a car accident. Maggie and Bill Bauer start an affair, which Bill feels guilty about when Bert arrives in Springfield. In March 1966, Maggie's husband Ben Scott shows up, alive after Maggie thought he had died in the Korean War. Ben opens a new restaurant in Springfield, but Maggie suspects he has ulterior motives. She hopes Bill will leave Bert and marry her, but Bill decides to stay married to Bert, which disappoints Maggie. Ben finds out about their affair and blackmails them with a copy of a love letter Maggie wrote to Bill.

Dr. Paul Fletcher and his wife Robin, as well as attorney George Hayes and his wife Jane, move from Selby Flats to Springfield. Both Paul and Jane secure high-powered jobs at Cedars Hospital, becoming prominent figures in the hospital's mid-1960s storyline. Meta briefly works as a nursing assistant at Cedars while Bruce becomes the hospital's Chief of Staff. The romantic troubles of two young couples, Leslie Jackson and Peggy Bauer with their respective partners, become the focus of the show's storyline in 1966–1967. Meta and Bruce leave for New York City's Presbyterian Hospital, where Bruce becomes Chief of Staff, and Paul Fletcher takes over as Chief of Staff at Cedars.

Ben Scott blackmails Bill and Maggie, forcing Maggie to remarry him, move to a new house, and quit working at Carson & Associates. Ben also coerces Bill to stay married to Bert. Ed discovers the affair and warns Bill to end it. Bill relapses into drinking and Bert discovers the affair, first by seeing Bill and Maggie together and later through Bill's confession. Despite this, Bert decides to stay with Bill and tries to change her ways. Maggie is confronted by Bert about the affair and told to stay married to Ben.

Meanwhile, Papa is unsure where to live after Meta and Bruce leave for New York City. Bill is bitter about Papa's nagging and tells him off, causing Papa to temporarily move to New York City. Paul is angry about Papa's living situation and suggests he speak with Bert. Bert is angry with Ed for gossiping about Papa's living situation to Bill.

Peggy works as a part-time candy striper at Cedars and confronts Ben when she overhears him arguing with Maggie. Ben lies and says the argument was about his will and a family trip Maggie didn't want to take. Peggy later discovers the truth about Bill and Maggie's affair when she gets stuck at his office and Bill, who is drunk, confuses her with Maggie and blabs about the affair. Peggy turns to Johnny for comfort but doesn't tell him the reason why.

Johnny becomes a handful for Robin, who is pregnant, and resents Maggie after Peggy learns the truth about the affair. Robin suffers a miscarriage and falls into a severe depression. Johnny blames himself but Paul tries to reassure him it wasn't his fault. Johnny moves out and briefly stays with his Uncle George and Aunt Jane, where he gets a job as an orderly at Cedars. Johnny admits to Peggy that he felt resentment towards Robin but didn't wish her harm or his half-sibling. Jane is dismayed by Johnny's spoiled behavior and turns him down for further help. Johnny moves out and Paul fears he's losing his son, but sees Peggy as a stabilizing influence. Ben Scott disagrees with this sentiment.

Agnes Nixon began a story in the latter half of 1966 that she only partially revealed before leaving as head writer. Leslie Jackson discovers that her father, Steve doesn't talk about her mother Victoria much, despite having a portrait of her in his living room that resembles Lynne Adams, who also plays Leslie. Steve tells Leslie that Victoria left them when she was a toddler. However, through flashbacks, the audience learns that Victoria enjoyed partying and being seen. One night, she embarrassed Steve, and he ordered her to leave and stay away. Leslie believed her mother was dead until later writers expanded on Nixon's story in 1974. Leslie's feeling of estrangement from Steve due to her mother's absence and his reluctance to discuss her leads her to be open to romance with Ed, despite his later struggles with alcoholism. Leslie also has another suitor, Dr. Joe Werner, who initially sees Sara McIntyre, a psychologist who arrives in Springfield and Cedars in January 1967, as a usurper in medicine due to her gender. Sara does work in other areas of medicine and eventually wins over Joe's respect. Sara also has a romantic past with Dr. Paul Fletcher, causing Paul's severely depressed wife, Robin, to sink further into depression. By October 1967, Robin throws herself into oncoming traffic, mirroring a plot device used to kill off Kathy nearly a decade earlier.

After Ed and Leslie marry, their happiness doesn't last. Bill and Bert's marriage stabilizes as Bill attends AA and gets sober. Papa moves back in with them, but Ed starts drinking heavily and becomes an alcoholic after discovering the affair between his father and Maggie Scott. He becomes verbally and physically violent towards Bert, Bill, Leslie, and Papa. Meanwhile, Ben Scott opposes the romance between Johnny Fletcher and his daughter Peggy. Johnny and Peggy get a marriage license, but Ben confronts them and dies of a heart attack. Peggy annuls the marriage, disappointing Johnny. In March 1968, Mike Bauer moves to Springfield and starts working with his former boss George Hayes. Mike is dismayed at Ed's abusive behavior towards Leslie and becomes romantically involved with her despite her lingering feelings for Ed.

Peggy meets gang leader Marty Dillman while he is in Cedars after a fight, and they marry shortly after. Meanwhile, Johnny becomes romantically involved with Tracey Delmar, who causes trouble in Springfield. Tracey is later revealed to be Charlotte Waring, who had swindled Dr. Sara McIntyre out of money. Marty finds out about Charlotte's true identity and starts flirting with her. Eventually, Johnny and Tracey get married, but the gig is up for Charlotte and she becomes a pariah in town. In September 1968, Ed gets into a physical fight with Bill and causes him to have a heart attack. Bill becomes a candidate for a heart transplant and is given nine years to live after a successful surgery. Bert is supported by Sara through the emotional turmoil of the transplant.

In January 1969, Marty Dillman is murdered and his pregnant wife Peggy is wrongly accused of the crime. While in jail, Peggy gives birth to a son named William Bauer Dillman, or Billy for short. Mike defends and exonerates Peggy of the crime, and she is treated like a daughter by Bert and Sara. Johnny reconciles with Peggy, and they get married while Johnny starts out as a surgeon at Cedars. Peggy becomes a registered nurse at Cedars. Dr. Paul Fletcher is thrilled to see his son, John, get his life straight and go into the medical profession.

After Charlotte's attempt to scam her as her "niece" "Tracey," Sara's life is not as easy as she helps her friends Bert and Peggy through their emotional turmoil. Paul expresses interest in Sara, but nothing comes of it due to his lingering feelings for his deceased wives. Joe develops romantic feelings for Sara, but she holds him off due to her old-fashioned ideas about relationships. Joe proposes to Sara and agrees to take her on a sabbatical to England, but Sara turns him down. While Joe is in England, he meets Cindy Brown and convinces her to return to Springfield for treatment. Joe and Cindy have a brief affair and Cindy changes her last name back to Gardner. Charlotte discovers the affair and tells Sara to get Joe in trouble. Sara decides to move on to other men but nearly meets her undoing with the next man she turns to.

Lee Gantry is a malaria patient at Cedars hospital, and Sara finds him attractive, charming, and erudite. After he recovers, she learns that he is an American who spent considerable time in England. They take a trip to his English country estate, where Sara becomes more enamored with him. However, Lee has a habit of pursuing lonely women, including Sara, and he was responsible for the death of his wealthy English wife, Alice Rawlings. Lee also incorporates Alice's architectural work into his farmhouse outside of Springfield. Alice's former household manager, Miss Mildred Foss, knows of Lee's crime and blackmails him into rehiring her. Lee and Miss Foss gaslight Sara for her money, with Miss Foss tampering with her appointments, checkbook, medication, and introducing her to a scary groundskeeper. Sara becomes anxious and buys a gun, prompting Joe Werner to seek help from Springfield police Lieutenant Pete Stassen, who dismisses his concerns. Joe learns from Dusty McGuire that Miss Foss was fired by Lee in the past, and something bad is about to happen at Lee's house involving Sara.

In March 1969, Ed's alcoholism catches up with him and Leslie gives him an ultimatum to either get sober or get a divorce. Ed moves back in with Bill and Bert, but Bill's efforts to get Ed to attend AA fail. In April 1969, Ed is involved in a traffic accident that causes Margie Wexler, one of Sara's pregnant patients, to have a miscarriage and lose her and her husband's child. Ed leaves the scene of the accident and resists arrest before being bailed out by Mike and Bill. However, Ed skips town, leaving his family behind.

In July 1969, Bill's plane crashes and he is presumed dead. Sara consoles Bert, who is also struggling with Ed's disappearance. Leslie's romantic relationship with Mike is in limbo, and Hope hopes that Leslie will become her new stepmother. Mike develops feelings for Charlotte, who had helped exonerate Peggy. However, Charlotte is still in love with Dr. Joe Werner, and Joe is still in love with Sara. As Ed remains missing, the relationships between Mike, Leslie, Charlotte, and Joe are at an impasse. Charlotte gets a job as vice administrator of Cedars, causing controversy. Mike proposes to Charlotte before the end of 1969, but Hope remains hopeful that Leslie will become her new stepmother and warns Bert that Charlotte may not be good for her father.

Also in 1969, Stanley Norris, a wealthy businessman, is introduced as a divorced man with a string of affairs. He divorces his second wife, Kit Vestid, after she discovers his infidelity, including an affair with Deborah Herbert Mehren, the wife of one of his employees. Kit herself has an affair with her stepson Ken, who is an attorney in practice with Mike, and also falls for Dr. Joe Werner. In September 1969, Ed resurfaces in Clayton, where he's working at Hastings Electrical Supply and gets involved with the company's secretary, Janet Mason. Janet's father, Grove Mason, initially disapproves of the relationship, but after Ed saves many lives in a work accident, he changes his mind. Meanwhile, Janet's mother, Ellen, warms up to Ed quickly and works to change Grove's mind. Ed eventually returns to Springfield in December 1969, hoping to reconcile with his wife Leslie.
