= Three Guys Named Mike =

1951 film by Charles Walters

- Theatrical poster
- Directed by: Charles Walters
- Screenplay by: Sidney Sheldon
- Story by: Ruth Brooks Flippen
- Based on: Suggestions by Ethel "Pug" Wells
- Produced by: Armand Deutsch
- Starring: Jane Wyman; Van Johnson; Howard Keel; Barry Sullivan
- Cinematography: Paul C. Vogel
- Edited by: Irvine Warburton
- Music by: Bronislau Kaper
- Production company: Metro-Goldwyn-Mayer
- Distributed by: Metro-Goldwyn-Mayer; Loew's Inc.
- Release date: March 1, 1951 (New York)
- Running time: 90 minutes
- Country: United States
- Language: English
- Budget: $859,000
- Box office: $2,230,000

Three Guys Named Mike is a 1951 MGM American romantic comedy film directed by Charles Walters and starring Jane Wyman, Van Johnson, Howard Keel and Barry Sullivan.

The film chronicles the story of an airline stewardess and her three suitors.

== Plot ==
Three Guys Named Mike (1951)

Marcy Lewis, a young woman from Indiana with an ambition to become an airline stewardess and see the world, passes an American Airlines training course. On her first flight, she inadvertently offends the pilot, Mike Jamison, and forgets the passengers' food. However, Mike's intervention with her boss earns her a second chance.

Marcy's home base is moved to Los Angeles and she finds an apartment with a friend from stewardess school. She meets passenger Mike Lawrence, a graduate research student in biology, then nearly loses her job again by permitting a young passenger to keep her dog in the cabin, against the airline's rules. Marcy is suspended for a week.

The battery in Marcy's car dies and a man named Mike Tracy helps to push start it. She later learns that he works for a Chicago advertising agency. Her idea to feature stewardesses endorsing soap pleases Tracy's client, and Marcy is invited to pose for magazine ads.

When all three men arrive to help Marcy move into the new bungalow that she is sharing with three other stewardesses, she struggles to associate each man with his name. Marcy assigns the names Mike for Mike Lawrence, Mickey for Mike Tracy and Michael for Mike Jamison. All three vie for Marcy's attention.

While at a party at her bungalow, Marcy is summoned to pose for another picture for the ad campaign. She is asked to wear a very short sarong rather than the regulation company uniform. The drunken photographer flirts with her and she strenuously objects, but he persists. The three Mikes arrive in time to thwart the photographer but then brawl with each other. The fracas makes headlines and causes Marcy and her pilot friend to be suspended from their jobs, as well as costing Mickey his account and jeopardizing Mike's job as a graduate research student and his fellowship award.

Marcy visits the superiors of all three men to plead for their reinstatement. After she succeeds, each of the three Mikes propose marriage to her as she is about to board a plane. Uncertain of which offer to accept, Marcy reacts favorably to Mike Lawrence's simple "I love you", and the other two Mikes concede that he is the guy for her.

== Cast ==
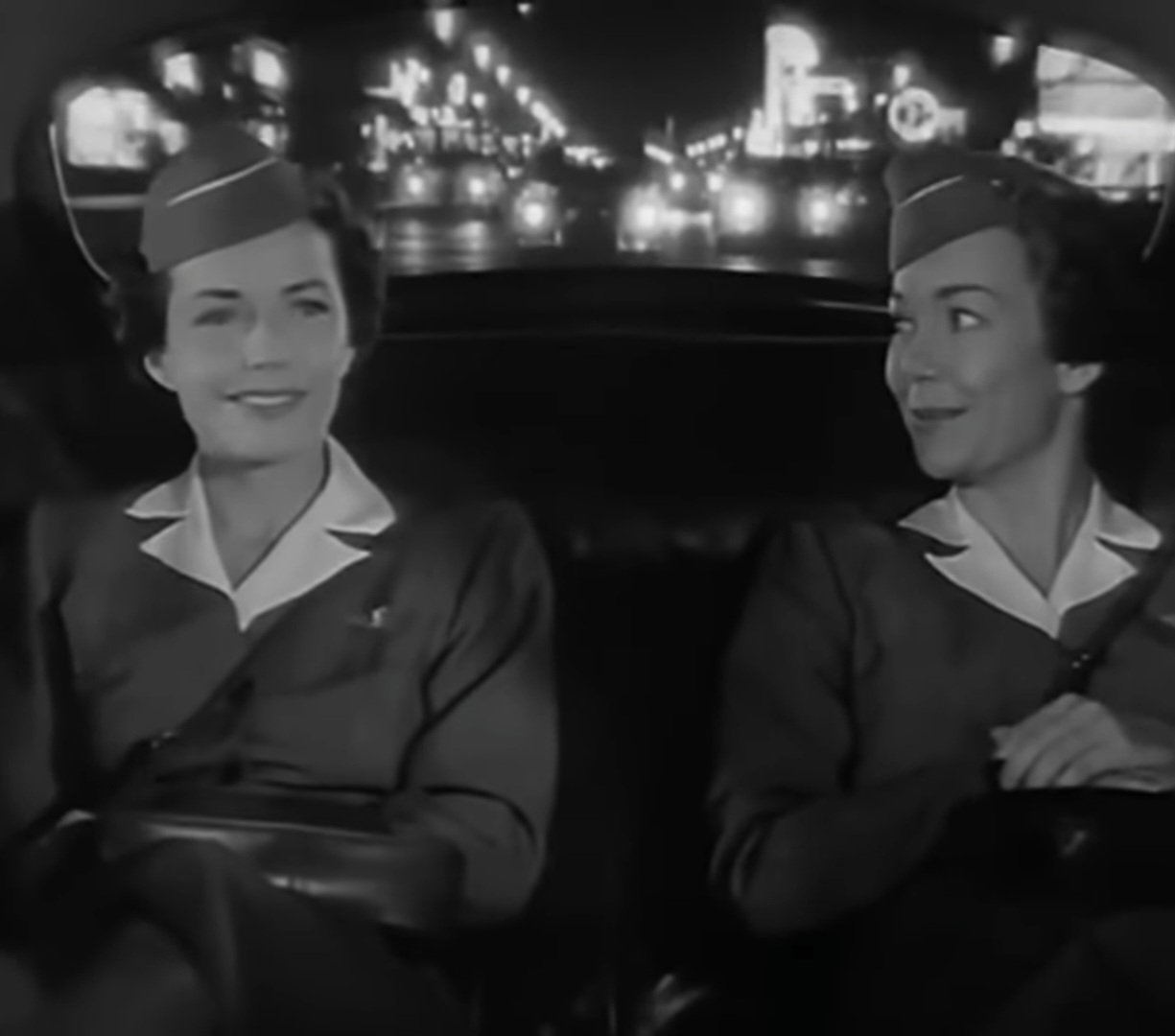
Anne Sargent (left) and Jane Wyman (right) in Three Guys Named Mike

- Jane Wyman as Marcy Lewis
- Van Johnson as Michael Lawrence
- Howard Keel as Mike Jamison
- Barry Sullivan as Mike Tracy
- Phyllis Kirk as Kathy Hunter
- Anne Sargent as Jan Baker
- Jeff Donnell as Alice Reymend
- Herbert Heyes as Scott Bellamy
- Robert Sherwood as Benson
- Don McGuire as MacWade Parker
- Barbara Billingsley as Ann White
- Hugh Sanders as Mr. Williams
- John Maxwell as Dr. Matthew Hardy
- Lewis Martin as C.R. Smith
- Ethel "Pug" Wells as Herself
- Sydney Mason as Osgood

== Production ==
Sidney Sheldon wrote the screenplay. based on a story by Ruth Brooks Flippen. The film's credits mention suggestions contributed by Ethel "Pug" Wells, an American Airlines flight attendant from Mississippi who met director William Wellman on a flight and recounted stories of her adventures in the air. Wells appears in a bit part as herself and is credited as a technical advisor.

== Reception ==
In a contemporary review for The New York Times, critic Bosley Crowther called the film "an oppressively bird-brained little romance" and a "contrived cloudland confection", writing: "It seems that this story developed in the mind of someone named Ethel 'Pug' Wells, who is (or was) an American Airlines hostess. For services rendered in the advertising line, that company should award her a gold star (its name is all over the film). But if she's still hostessing, it should keep an eye on her. We suspect she spends too much time reading those leather-bound slick magazines rather than attending to the business of serving her real-life passengers."

Three Guys Named Mike earned an estimated $1,707,000 at the U.S. and Canadian box office and $523,000 elsewhere, resulting in a profit to MGM of $577,000.

== Legacy ==
The film entered the public domain in the United States because the claimants did not renew its copyright registration in the 28th year after publication.
