= Paul McGrath (actor) =

American actor (1904–1978)

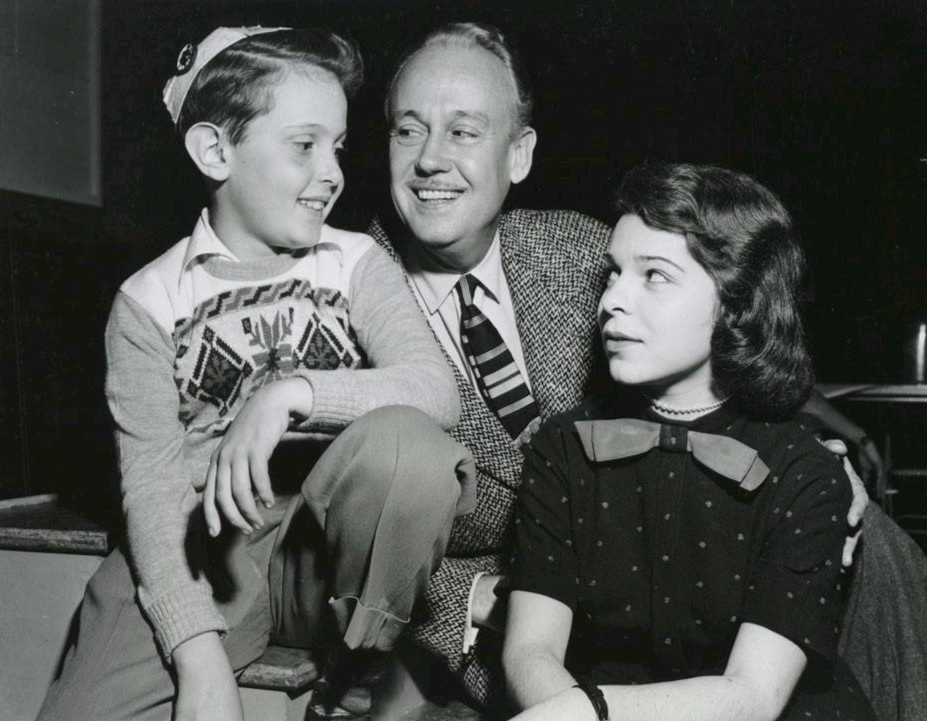
- McGrath (center) as Dr. Martin Allison in the radio comedy My Son Jeep. Also pictured are Bobby Alford (son "Jeep") and Joan Lazer (daughter Peggy).
- Born: April 11, 1904; Chicago, Illinois, U.S.
- Died: April 13, 1978 (aged 74); London, England
- Occupations: Film, television, stage actor
- Years active: 1940–1969
- Spouse(s): Lulu Mae Hubbard (? - 1966, her death); Anne Sargent (?-1978) (his death)

Paul McGrath (April 11, 1904 – April 13, 1978) was an American film, television, Broadway, and radio actor best known for his radio appearances in the 1940s and 1950s.

== Early years ==
Born in Chicago, McGrath was educated in public schools in New York, including Evander Childs High School. He attended Carnegie Tech and studied engineering before developing an interest in drama. He left in 1924 to become an actor.

== Career ==
McGrath's professional debut came as a member of a touring company of The First Year.

On radio, McGrath was a regular on Crime Doctor and on the soap operas Big Sister and Young Doctor Malone. He played the host on Inner Sanctum Mystery on radio and on a syndicated TV version of the program. His other work on television included appearances on the dramas Armstrong Circle Theatre, Hallmark Hall of Fame, and The United States Steel Hour. He also was featured on TV serials, including The Edge of Night, The Doctors, Love of Life, Guiding Light, and The Secret Storm.

McGrath's work on stage included performing as a member of the George Sharp Stock Company at the Pitt Theater in Pittsburgh, Pennsylvania. On Broadway, he appeared in more than 30 plays, including the 1949 Clifford Odets Broadway play The Big Knife. His Broadway debut was as Dr. Green in In the Near Future (1925), and his last Broadway role was Nick Hagen in Brightower (1970).

== Personal life and death ==
McGrath was married to actresses Lulu Mae Hubbard (who died in 1966) and Anne Sargent. He died of a heart attack in his sleep in London on April 13, 1978, two days after his 74th birthday.

== Filmography ==
Year	Title	Role	Notes
1940	Parole Fixer	Tyler Craden	
1940	Wildcat Bus	Stanley Regan	
1940	This Thing Called Love	Gordon Daniels	
1941	Dead Men Tell	Mr. Parks	
1941	We Go Fast	Carberry	
1941	Marry the Boss's Daughter	Taylor	Uncredited
1943	No Time for Love	Henry Fulton	
1952	Guiding Light	Henry Benedict #4 (1967)	TV series
1954	First Love	Matthew James	TV series
1957	A Face in the Crowd	Macey	
1962	Advise & Consent	Hardiman Fletcher	
1969	Pendulum	Senator Augustus Cole	
