= Icebound (play) =

Icebound is a 1923 play written by American playwright Owen Davis, for which he received the Pulitzer Prize for Drama. It is set in Veazie, Maine, a suburb of Bangor.

== Productions ==
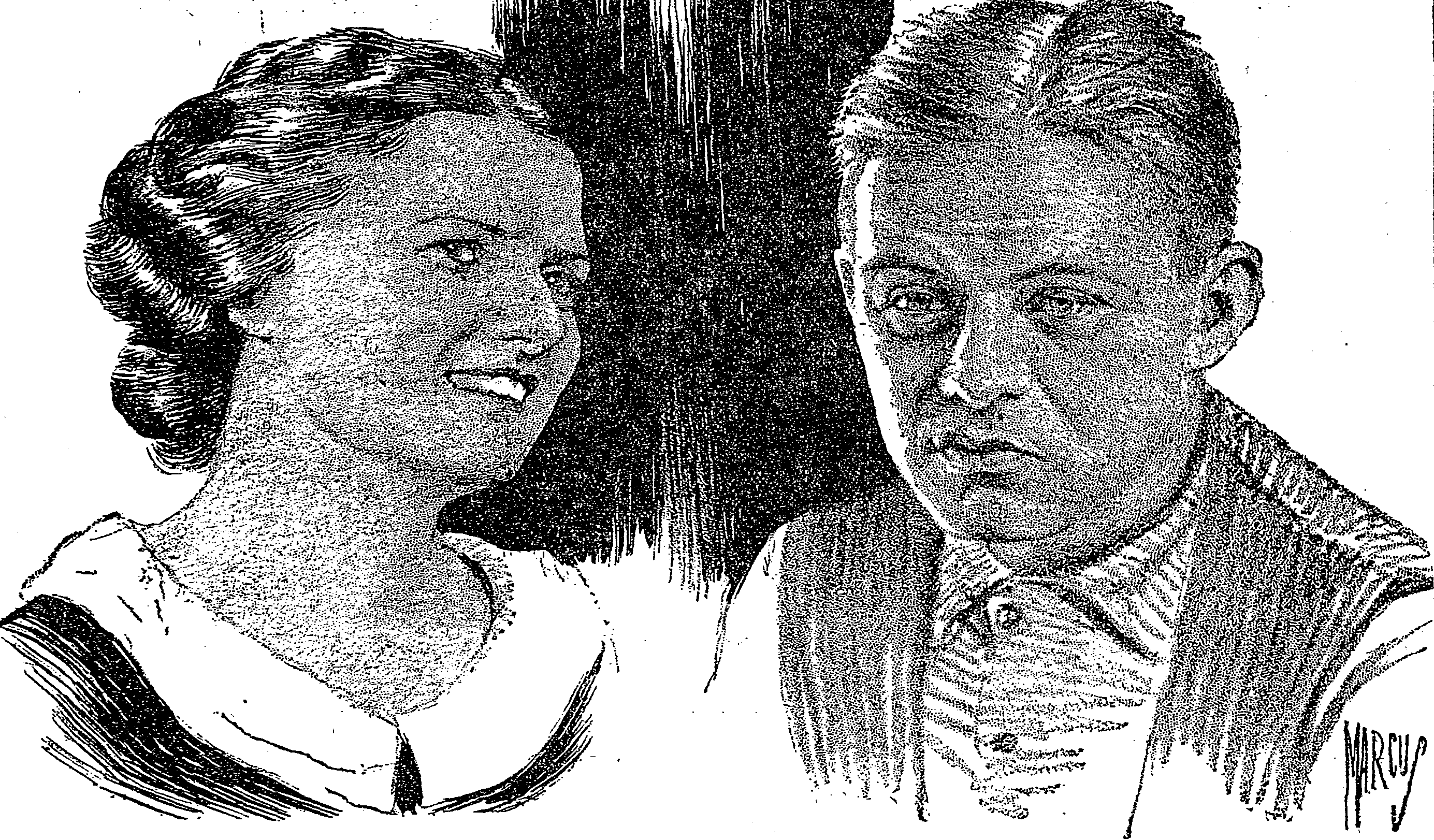
Drawing by Edwin Marcus of Phyllis Povah as Jane Crosby and Robert Ames as Ben Jordan

Icebound opened on Broadway at the Sam H. Harris Theatre on February 10, 1923 and closed on June 1, 1923 after 145 performances. Directed by Sam Forrest and produced by Sam H. Harris, the cast featured Edna May Oliver (Hannah), Lawrence Eddinger (Doctor Curtis), Robert Ames (Ben Jordan), John Westley (Henry Jordan), Lottie Linthicum (Emma Jordan), Frances Neilson (Ella Jordan), Boots Wooster (Nettie Jordan), Phyllis Povah (Jane Crosby) and Charles Henderson (Jim Jay).

The play was produced Off-Off-Broadway at the Metropolitan Playhouse of New York in September 2014.

Icebound won the 1923 Pulitzer Prize for Drama. The play was included in the Best Plays Of 1922-23, by Burns Mantle.

== Plot ==
The Jordan family is in their farm in Veazie, Maine in October 1922. They await the reading of the will by Judge John Bradford of the family matriarch who has just died. Much to the family's dismay, the farm and all of the money has been left to a distant cousin Jane Crosby. Jane has been told that she is to take care of the legal trouble of the young son of the family, Ben. Ben had left because he accidentally burned a neighbor's farm. Ben begins a flirtatious relationship with Nettie, the adopted daughter of Emma Jordan.

== Critical reception ==
The February 12, 1923 review of the play by the New York Times said "A fine performance and an unusually good play came together at the Sam H. Harris Theatre..." On the play itself, the reviewer says "It is a grim and nearly relentless play of the New England and the New Englanders that Owen Davis knows. It has an absorbing first act, followed by two acts that are only slightly less gripping". The reviewer praised the performances of Ames and Povah, thought John Westley had his best performance of his career, and loved Oliver's performance as the maid.

== Film ==
The play was made into a film, Icebound, directed by William C. deMille, and released in 1924.
