= Edmon Ryan =

American actor (1905–1984)

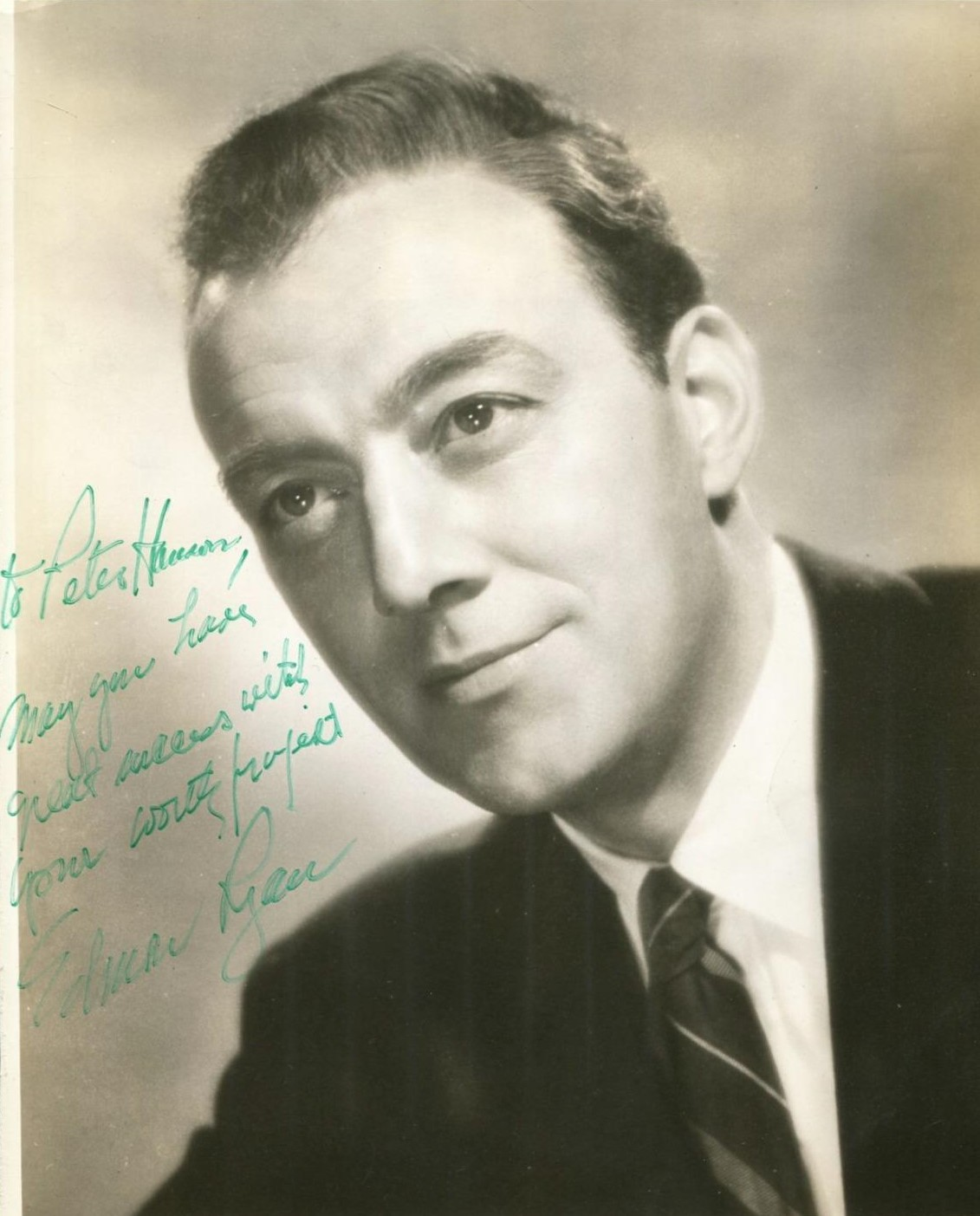
- Ryan in the 1940s
- Born: Edmon Ryan Mossbarger; June 5, 1905; Cecilia, Kentucky, U.S.
- Died: August 4, 1984 (aged 79); St. Matthews, Kentucky, U.S.
- Resting place: Cave Hill Cemetery, Louisville, Kentucky
- Occupation: Actor
- Years active: 1936–1970
- Spouse(s): Eleanore Dakin Anne Sargent (m. 1949; div. 1967)
- Children: 1

Edmon Ryan (born Edmon Ryan Mossbarger; June 5, 1905 – August 4, 1984) was an American theater, film, and television actor.

== Early years ==
A native of Cecilia, Kentucky, he was the son of Isham Edward Mossbarger and Pearl Shelton Mossbarger, and he had a brother. He graduated from Yale University's School of Drama.

== Career ==
Ryan often portrayed hard-nosed characters. His Broadway debut came in Post Road. He also performed in Command Decision, Dream Girl, and The Male Animal and acted on stage in California and Europe.

Ryan acted on radio, film and television, including one year on Search for Tomorrow.

Ryan produced four plays abroad, and in 1957 he took an option on Half a Kingdom with plans to produce it.

== Personal life and death ==
Ryan married Eleanore Dakin on August 3, 1929, in Milwaukee, Wisconsin. He married actress Anne Sargent on December 13, 1949, in New York. They had one child, and they were divorced. He died on August 4, 1984, in Baptist Hospital East in St. Matthews, Kentucky. He is interred in Cave Hill Cemetery in Louisville, Kentucky.

== Selected filmography ==
- Crime Over London (1936) – Spider
- Strangers on Honeymoon (1936)
- Gangway (1937) – Red Mike
- Non-Stop New York (1937) – American Prosecutor (uncredited)
- Smash and Grab (1937) – Barman (uncredited)
- Oh Boy! (1938) – Butch
- Hey! Hey! USA (1938) – Ace Marco
- Murder in Soho (1939) – Spike
- The Nursemaid Who Disappeared (1939) – Paul Renseler (uncredited)
- The Dark Eyes of London (1939) – Lieutenant Patrick O'Reilly
- Battleground (1949) – Major (uncredited)
- Side Street (1949) – Victor Backett
- Mystery Street (1950) – James Joshua Harkley
- The Breaking Point (1950) – Rogers
- Three Secrets (1950) – Hardin
- Undercover Girl (1950) – Doc Holmes
- Highway 301 (1950) – Detective Sergeant Truscott / Narrator
- The Du Pont Story (1950) – Lammot du Pont, the elder
- Storm Warning (1951) – Trailer's Hooded Narrator (uncredited)
- Sugarfoot (1951) – Opening Off Screen Narrator (voice, uncredited)
- The Guy Who Came Back (1951) – Joe Demarcus
- Go Man Go (1954) – Zack Leader
- Knights of the Queen (1954)
- Alfred Hitchcock Presents (1956) (Season 2 Episode 14: "John Brown's Body") - Dr. Croatman
- Le avventure dei tre moschettieri (1957)
- La spada imbattibile (1957)
- Alfred Hitchcock Presents (1958) (Season 3 Episode 31: "The Festive Season") - Attorney John
- Le imprese di una spada leggendaria (1958)
- Good Day for a Hanging (1959) – William P. Selby, Attorney
- Alfred Hitchcock Presents (1960) (Season 5 Episode 31: "I Can Take Care of Myself") - "Detective" Jack Simpson
- Two for the Seesaw (1962) – Frank Taubman
- The Alfred Hitchcock Hour (1964) (Season 2 Episode 31: "Isabel") - Lieutenant John Huntley
- A Global Affair (1964) – Gavin
- A House Is Not a Home (1964) – Sam
- The Americanization of Emily (1964) – Admiral Hoyle
- The Playground (1965) – Jason Porter
- Banning (1967) – Stuart Warren
- Topaz (1969) – McKittreck
- Tora! Tora! Tora! (1970) – Rear Admiral Patrick NL Bellinger (final film role)
