= The Marrying Kind =

1952 film by George Cukor

- Theatrical release poster
- Directed by: George Cukor
- Written by: Garson Kanin; Ruth Gordon
- Produced by: Bert Granet
- Starring: Judy Holliday; Aldo Ray; Madge Kennedy
- Cinematography: Joseph Walker
- Edited by: Charles Nelson
- Music by: Hugo Friedhofer
- Production company: Columbia Pictures
- Distributed by: Columbia Pictures
- Release date: March 13, 1952 (New York)
- Running time: 92 minutes
- Country: United States
- Language: English
- Box office: $1.7 million (U.S. rentals)

The Marrying Kind is a 1952 American comedy drama film directed by George Cukor and starring Judy Holliday, Aldo Ray and Madge Kennedy.

== Plot ==
Through flashbacks, Florence and Chet Keefer recount the key events of their troubled marriage to the judge overseeing their divorce case. They nearly find fortune on multiple occasions, continuously argue about money and grieve the tragic loss of their son, who drowns in a lake during a family outing. The death leaves them shattered and emotionally strained. Florence returns to work while Chet is recuperating from an injury suffered when walking in front of truck during a moment of great despair. When her former boss leaves her money in his will, Chet accuses her of infidelity. Their daughter begins to show signs of the trauma caused by their constant and loud arguments. After talking with the judge, Florence and Chet realize that they belong together.

== Cast ==
- Judy Holliday as Florence Keefer
- Aldo Ray as Chet Keefer
- Madge Kennedy as Judge Anne B. Carroll
- Sheila Bond as Joan Shipley
- John Alexander as Howard Shipley
- Rex Williams as George Bastian
- Phyllis Povah as Mrs. Derringer
- Mickey Shaughnessy as Pat Bundy
- Griff Barnett as Charley
- Peggy Cass as Emily Bundy
- Nancy Kulp as Edie

== Production ==
Director George Cukor, who had directed Judy Holliday in Winged Victory (1944), Adam's Rib (1949) and her Academy Award-winning performance in Born Yesterday (1950), saw her role in The Marrying Kind as a critical juncture in her career, saying: "She must be the girl the audience prepares to see—and to laugh at, and still vary her characterization for sympathy. ... But I'm not worrying. Judy can make herself into anything."

Cukor contacted Ina Claire, who had not appeared in a film since 1943, about the role of the judge. Claire told Cukor that she was not interested in money but would take the role in exchange for a Picasso painting hanging in his office. Cukor then suggested former silent-film star Madge Kennedy for the role. It was Kennedy's first feature-film appearance since 1926 and her first in a sound film.

Filming began in New York on September 17, 1951 and was completed on November 17.

== Release ==
The film's world premiere was held at the Victoria Theatre in New York on March 13, 1952. Columbia Pictures sent Aldo Ray on a month-long promotional tour and appended a brief promotional segment about Ray to the end of the film.

== Reception ==
In a contemporary review for The New York Times, critic Bosley Crowther called the film "one of the happiest entertainments of the year" and wrote:

Think it not curious if we don't seem to be as side-splittingly impressed with the hilarities in this picture as its promotion might lead you to expect. Hilarity is in it—hilarity of the best—as would be almost mandatory in any picture with Miss Holliday. But the charming and lastingly affecting thing about "The Marrying Kind" is its bittersweet comprehension of the thorniness of the way that stretches out for two young people after they have taken the marriage vows. Thorniness isn't apparent at the start, we'll concede—and that's a cue not alone to the pattern of this picture but to the realism of its view. ... Although the form of the picture is a good bit on the obvious side, with the two frustrated spouses telling their story to a judge, Miss Gordon and Mr. Kanin have made it most palatable by wittily having the narrator tell a different story from that which is played on the screen. ... Also the rather sharp transition from the hilarity of gentle farce to the tension of sober drama may be a bit abrupt for easy assimilation, but the development is sound and the contrast in mood and comprehension elevates the significance of the film. ... But the big surprise of this picture is the talent of Mr. Ray in presenting a richly appealing and naturally complicated young man. Not handsome but sturdy in appearance, and possessed of a melting, husky voice, he has a gift for flowing humor and straight-faced pathos that is almost beyond belief. His winning performance of the husband is a great factor in this film.

Critic John L. Scott of the Los Angeles Times wrote: "The emphasis in this comedy-drama falls on characterization rather than story, which serves, however. admirably as a framework for the 'acting.' Talk is cheap in the picture; there is a load of it, and audiences may have some difficulty following the dialogue, especially when the domestic warriors tee off on each other. Both Miss Holliday and Ray use raspy, or cracked, voices. The effect when both shout in anger is something! ... Comedy touches are numerous and most welcome in the picture, which points up the disagreeable qualities of the combatants a bit too much, in this reviewer's opinion."
