= Let's Face It (film) =

1943 film by Sidney Lanfield

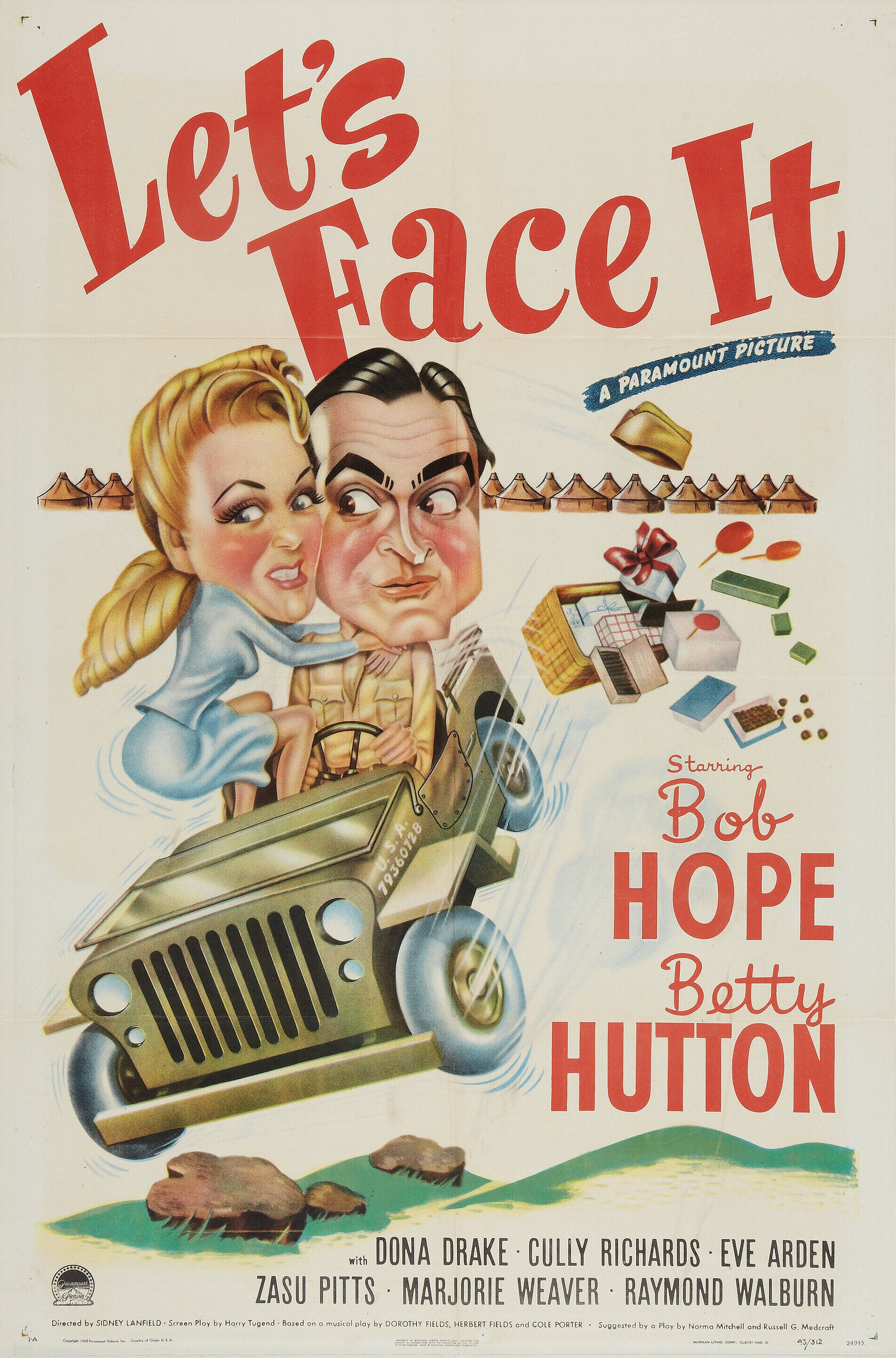
- Theatrical release poster
- Directed by: Sidney Lanfield
- Written by: Harry Tugend; Dorothy Fields (play); Herbert Fields (play); Russell G. Medcraft (play); Norma Mitchell (play)
- Produced by: Fred Kohlmar
- Starring: Bob Hope; Betty Hutton; Eve Arden; ZaSu Pitts
- Cinematography: Lionel Lindon
- Edited by: Paul Weatherwax
- Music by: Robert Emmett Dolan
- Production company: Paramount Pictures
- Distributed by: Paramount Pictures
- Release date: August 4, 1943
- Running time: 76 minutes
- Country: United States
- Language: English

Let's Face It is a 1943 American screwball musical comedy film, directed by Sidney Lanfield and starring Bob Hope and Betty Hutton, with Dona Drake, Cully Richards, Eve Arden, ZaSu Pitts, Marjorie Weaver, Raymond Walburn, Phyllis Povah, Joe Sawyer, Dave Willock and Nicco and Tanya. Produced and released by Paramount Pictures, it's adapted from the 1941 musical of the same name, written by Herbert and Dorothy Fields, which was itself based on the 1925 play The Cradle Snatchers, written by Russel Medcraft and Norma Mitchell.

Cole Porter wrote the songs for the 1941 stage musical. Paramount removed most of the songs from the stage musical, with Jule Styne and Sammy Cahn writing one original song for the film.

A Bob Hope vehicle, the film stars Hope as Jerry Walker, a mischievous army private. He crashes an army jeep and is ordered to pay up. To get the money, he agrees to help out three scheming women, Maggie, Cornelia and Nancy, played by Arden, Pitts and Povah, who are attending his fiancée Winnie Porter’s, played by Hutton, weight loss camp.

== Plot ==
Winnie Porter runs a weight loss camp nearby Camp Arthur, a military base where her fiancé, U.S. Army private Jerry Walker, is stationed. Winnie gets infuriated when she discovers Jerry is selling sweets to her clients for a quick buck.

As Jerry prepares to drive back to Camp Arthur, he is stopped by three women attending Winnie's camp, Cornelia, Nancy and Maggie. The three women suspect their husbands are being unfaithful to them as they've just dropped them off at the camp and then rushed to a "fishing" trip at Cornelia's vacation home. In order to prove their suspicions and to make their husbands jealous, the three women plan to get dates and bring them to Cornelia's vacation home. For $100, they ask Jerry if he can set them up with him and two other G.I. 's, an offer which he rejects.

When Jerry arrives back at Camp Arthur, he accidentally crashes his car into the canteen wall. Jerry's superior, Sergeant Wiggins says he either has to pay $300 in damages or spend six months on guard duty. Out of desperation, Jerry agrees to the women's proposal in exchange for $300. Jerry ropes his pals Barney and Frankie into it, saying that the women are young beauties and the offer of $20 each if they help him.

In order to leave camp, Jerry fakes a head injury and sneaks away while pretending to go to the army hospital with Barney and Frankie. Meanwhile, Winnie suspects that Jerry is rendezvousing with her clients. Along with Barney and Frankie's girlfriends, Muriel and Jean, they follow the men to the house. When their suspicions are confirmed, the women break off their relationships with the G.I.'s.

Suddenly, Cornelia, Nancy and Maggie's husbands show up with dates. As Cornelia, Nancy and Maggie scold their husbands, their dates silently slip away. To make their ex-girlfriends jealous, Jerry, Barney and Frankie go to a club with Cornelia, Nancy and Maggie. Winnie, Muriel and Jean copy the idea and go to the same club with the husbands of Cornelia, Nancy and Maggie. When both groups arrive at the club, Jerry discovers that Sergeant Wiggins is in the booth next to them. Sergeant Wiggins recognizes the voice of Jerry and turns to confront him. Jerry fools Wiggins by pretending to be insane, causing him to call an ambulance.

Eventually Jerry realises the jig will be up, so he, Barney and Frankie steal a rowboat to escape. As the men row out to sea, a periscope suddenly breaks through the floor of the boat, revealing a surfacing German submarine. When the commander of the submarine realises he has three allied soldiers stuck on top, he attempts to drive the sub into the open ocean. But Jerry pulls out a mirror and places it in front of the periscopes's lense. The commander is tricked into crashing into the shore and he and his crew are captured.

A year later, Jerry ends up in prison for causing more chaos and Winnie calmly waves goodbye to him with their newborn baby.

== Cast ==
- Bob Hope as Jerry Walker
- Betty Hutton as Winnie Porter
- Dona Drake as Muriel
- Cully Richards as Frankie Burns
- Eve Arden as Maggie Watson
- ZaSu Pitts as Cornelia Figeson
- Marjorie Weaver as Jean Blanchard
- Raymond Walburn as Julian Watson
- Phyllis Povah as Nancy Collister
- Joe Sawyer as Sergeant Wiggins
- Dave Willock as Barney Hilliard
- Nicco and Tanya as Dance Duo
- Andrew Tombes as Judge Henry Clay Pigeon (uncredited)
- Arthur Loft as George Collister (uncredited)
- Grace Hayle as Mrs. Wigglesworth (uncredited)
- Evelyn Dockson as Mrs. Taylor (uncredited)
- Emory Parnell as Colonel (uncredited)

== Soundtrack ==
- "Who Did? I Did! Yes, I Did!" — (Music by Jule Styne and Lyrics by Sammy Cahn) Performed by Betty Hutton and Bob Hope
- "Let's Face It" — (Written by Cole Porter) Performed by Soldiers at Camp Arthur
- "Let's Not Talk About Love" — (Written by Cole Porter) Performed by Betty Hutton

== Production ==
Paramount paid $225,000 for the screen rights to the play. There was a dispute over the screen rights to Let's Face It as 20th Century Fox owned the screen rights to Cradle Snatchers, of which Let's Face It (play) was based on. As a compromise, $100,000 of the money Paramount paid for the screen rights were given to 20th Century Fox.

Danny Kaye, the star of the Broadway play Let's Face It, was to reprise his role as Jerry Walker in the film adaptation. Due to the dispute between Paramount and 20th Century Fox over the screen rights, Kaye was removed and instead the film was made a vehicle for Bob Hope.

Betty Jane Rhodes was cast as Winnie Porter in September, 1942. Hutton was to be starring with Alan Ladd in Incendiary Blonde, but the film was postponed because Ladd enlisted in the army in January, 1943. In January, 1943, Paramount replaced Rhodes with Hutton.

Eddie Bracken and Marjorie Reynolds were slated to star in Let's Face It. The film was Marjorie Weaver's first as a freelancer, as she had previously been under contract to 20th Century Fox. Filming began in February, 1943 and ended in April, 1943.

== Release and reception ==
Let's Face It premiered at the Paramount Theatre in New York City on August 4th, 1943 and was opened by Benny Goodman and his Orchestra.

The New York Times wrote at the time of its release that: "Strictly as hot-weather fare, Let's Face It, now at the Paramount, is an acceptable bit of monkeyshines, but not much more. As a vehicle for Bob Hope it is a rather feeble and outdated contraption, and if it weren't for Mr. Hope himself Let's Face It would be a very sad affair indeed."

Variety wrote that: "Tugend, however, has managed to inject many more laughs than were in the Broadway musical click, which was highlighted by Danny Kaye’s delivery of ‘Melody in 4-F’, replaced here with a Sammy Cahn-Jule Styne number, ‘Who Did? I Did, Yes I did’. The laughs, in fact, come so often and so fast as to be stepping on one another, with the audience estimated as missing 25% of the gags. Bob Hope, a master at fast vaudeville timing of comedy material, and Betty Hutton, glamorized to an unprecedented degree for a hoydenish singer, are an okay romantic team. They are given better than average support by Cully Richards and Dave Willock, as Hope’s pals; and Eve Arden, who was in the Broadway cast."

The Motion Picture Herald gave a positive review, writing that: "Using the musical comedy by Cole Porter and Herbert and Dorothy Fields as a plot framework, Harry Tugend has concocted a screenplay for the jaunty nonsense of Bob Hope which should bring chuckles from the dog days of August and keep them coming through Christmas. It's a service comedy that goes outside Army routine for its situations and dodges most of the old Army gags. Paramount has recognized in Betty Hutton the natural Hope helpmate and has wisely let their combined antics explode, ignore and overwhelm the original story of three service men."
