= Post Road (play) =

Play by Wilbur Daniel Steele and Norma Mitchell

- Original language: English
- Written by: Wilbur Daniel Steele and Norma Mitchell
- Subject: Baby kidnapping mystery
- Genre: Comedy
- Setting: The living room of Emily Madison's home in Connecticut.

Premiere
- Date: December 4, 1934
- Place: Theatre Masque, New York City
- Directed by: H. C. Potter

Post Road is a two-act, four-scene play written by Wilbur Daniel Steele and Norma Mitchell, and staged by H. C. Potter. It is a comedy, albeit with some serious overtones in its mystery plot. It has a medium-sized cast, moderate pacing, and only one setting. The action occurs in the living room of Emily Madison's rambling ancestral home on the Boston Post Road in Connecticut during October 1934. Emily Madison provides accommodations for tourists, and the plot hinges on a party of four who descend on her one week in October. There are no romantic elements in the storyline, and middle-aged characters predominate.

The play was produced by H. C. Potter and George Haight. It had moderate box office success on Broadway, running for 209 performances. Its success depended heavily on the comedy of the character George Preble, played by Percy Kilbride in the original production. There doesn't seem to have been a tour by the original Broadway production, nor any major revival. The play was published in 1935.

== Characters ==
Characters are listed in order of appearance within their scope.

Lead

- Emily Madison is a middle-aged unmarried woman who lives in rural Connecticut and accommodates guests in her ancestral home.

Supporting

- George Preble is Emily's late forties unemployed brother-in-law, living on her bounty, obsessed with short-wave radio.
- May Madison Preble is Emily's younger sister and George's worried wife.
- Wesley Cartwright is a stuffy middle-aged clergyman, up to now Emily's only paying guest, who comes and goes.
- Dr. Spender is a middle-aged physician who asks accommodation for his party.
- Nurse Martin is a mid-thirties woman who helps Dr. Spender to look after the Girl. She calls him "Frank" in stress.
- The Girl is a young woman who arrives with Dr. Spender and Nurse Martin. Spender refers to her as "Edna" and "Miss Smith".
- Matt is the hard-looking chauffeur to Dr. Martin and his party.

Featured

- Bill is a brash young man from Marion, Ohio, looking for a room for Celia and himself.
- Celia is a giggly young lady, married to Bill.
- Virgil Beamis is a handsome young Connecticut State Trooper.
- Mrs. Canby is an attractive middle-aged woman, a neighbor whose visit discomfits George Preble.
- Mrs. Cashler is Jeeby's mother, a middle-aged woman.

Walk-On

- Jeeby Cashler is a strong young girl who picks up and returns the laundry from Emily's home.
- Jay is a Connecticut State Trooper, Virgil's subordinate.

== Synopsis ==
Emily Madison provides accommodations for tourists in her rambling old ancestral home on the Boston Post Road in Connecticut. Her sister May and unemployed brother-in-law George live with her. George is obsessed with short-wave radio, tuning in to police calls and foreign stations. Emily's only boarder is Rev. Cartwright, an itinerant preacher who comes and goes. When a young traveling couple, Bill and Celia, stop by to look for a room, Cartwright discourages them. May and George are unable to counter his influence, and the couple departs for a motel with more amenities.

Jeeby, a strongly-built taciturn teenager, once more delivers an incomplete and mixed-up assortment of clean laundry, to Emily's consternation. A limousine pulls up to the house, and Dr. Spender enters seeking a room for his patient, a young woman who has been taken ill while travelling. He and Nurse Martin take the Girl to a room, while the chauffeur Matt brings in her luggage. Dr. Spender confides that the Girl is the unmarried daughter of a prominent Episcopalian bishop, hence they don't want to reveal her name. Later that night noises from the girl's room seem to indicate she is giving birth, and soon a baby's cries are heard in the living room. Dr. Spender and Matt depart, leaving Nurse Martin to care for the baby. The infant remains in the room with the Girl, and only an occasional cry is heard from it during the next week.

Dr. Spender and Matt return, bringing more things for the baby. The Girl is pronounced well-enough to leave the room, while Emily, May, and George finally get to see the baby boy. The Girl seems restless and uninterested in her infant. She tries to get music from George's radio but it only produces static. Later, George is able to tune into a police call about the recent kidnapping of a baby. Emily, holding a baby doll that Nurse Martin used to calm the infant, suddenly realizes the noise it makes is the same that they have been hearing the past week.

The Girl, bored and rebellious, wants to leave. Rev. Cartwright and Dr. Spender, who seem to know each other, warn her against trying to travel so soon. While Nurse Martin holds the baby, the Girl leaves the house, clearly frightened, followed by Matt, while Spender and Cartwright watch.

State Trooper Virgil Beamis and his partner Jay visit the Madison mansion, looking for information about the kidnapping. Beamis is suspicious of Cartwright, who looks familiar to him. Since the Girl is gone, Emily claims the baby is hers, which causes amusement to Beamis, on account of her age and unmarried state. The troopers depart, and soon neighbors start dropping in to try and see if the rumors about Emily's baby are true. Mrs. Canby comes calling to borrow corn starch, but really to snoop. May eventually pushes her out, but not before she sees a baby bottle. George, tuning in another police radio call, hears the body of a young woman who was beaten to death has been found on the Post Road. By now, Emily, George, and May realize they are captive in their own home.

Emily outwits the kidnappers by hiding the real baby in the washbasket with the dirty laundry with a note for the police. Jeeby takes the basket away, while Emily and May fool the kidnappers by using their own decoy baby doll to make them think its still in its room. The police arrive and arrest the crooks, and the real baby is restored to its parents.

== Original production ==
=== Background ===
Husband and wife Steele and Mitchell had collaborated on two plays in 1934, Any Woman and Post Road. The former, a marital farce on divorce, was given a week-long tryout at the Castle Theatre on the Boardwalk at Long Beach, New York during August 1934, but doesn't appear to have subsequently been produced for Broadway.

During late October 1934, H. C. Potter and George Haight announced that Post Road would be their first production of the season, and that casting was in progress. The New York Daily News said that Lucile Watson would likely star. Rehearsals began November 7, 1934, using a setting created by Raymond Sovey. The costumes were designed and made by Mary Merrill. Further members of the cast were identified on November 14, 1934, as Edward Fielding, Percy Kilbride, Romaine Callender, Edna Holland, Henry Norell, Wendy Atkin, Virginia Tracy, and Caroline Newcombe.

=== Cast ===
Cast during the original Broadway run
Role	Actor	Dates	Notes
Emily Madison	Lucile Watson	Dec 04, 1934 - May 7, 1935	
Emily Madison	Zamah Cunningham	May 8, 1934 - Jun 01, 1935	Cunningham was a last minute substitute for a previously announced replacement actress.
George Preble	Percy Kilbride	Dec 04, 1934 - Mar 30, 1935	
George Preble	Herbert Yost	Apr 01, 1935 - Jun 01, 1935	
May Madison Preble	Mary Sargent	Dec 04, 1934 - Feb 9, 1935	Sargent left to appear in Times Have Changed.
May Madison Preble	Ruth Gates	Feb 11, 1935 - Jun 01, 1935	
Wesley Cartwright	Romaine Callender	Dec 04, 1934 - Jun 01, 1935	
Dr. Spender	Edward Fielding	Dec 04, 1934 - Jun 01, 1935	
Nurse Martin	Edna Holland	Dec 04, 1934 - Jun 01, 1935	
The Girl	Wendy Atkin	Dec 04, 1934 - Apr 18, 1935	Illness forced Atkin to drop out of the play in mid-April 1935.
The Girl	Unknown	Apr 19, 1935 - Jun 01, 1935	Whether Atkin was able to return or was permanently replaced is unknown.
Matt	Henry Norell	Dec 04, 1934 - Jun 01, 1935	
Bill	Dillon Deasy	Dec 04, 1934 - May 25, 1935	
Bill	William Muir	May 27, 1935 - Jun 01, 1935	
Celia	Geraldine Brown	Dec 04, 1934 - May 25, 1935	
Celia	Honora Bruere	May 27, 1935 - Jun 01, 1935	
Virgil Bemis	Edmon Ryan	Dec 04, 1934 - Jun 01, 1935	
Mrs. Canby	Caroline Newcombe	Dec 04, 1934 - Jun 01, 1935	
Mrs. Cashler	Virginia Tracy	Dec 04, 1934 - Jun 01, 1935	
Jeeby Cashler	Ada May Reed	Dec 04, 1934 - Jun 01, 1935	
Jay	Leonard Barker	Dec 04, 1934 - Jun 01, 1935	

=== Premiere ===
Potter and Haight were evidently confident about their production, for the play premiered at the Theatre Masque on December 4, 1934, without previews or tryouts.

=== Reception ===
Edgar Price in the Brooklyn Citizen was almost gushing in his praise of Lucille Watson. Rowland Field in the Times-Union spread his praise over all the principal players as well as the producing-directing team of Potter and Haight. Arthur Pollock in the Brooklyn Daily Eagle thought Post Road "an efficient play, funny and thrilling", with Percy Kilbride the source of most laughs.

Burns Mantle in the Daily News said it was "above average, but considerably muddled". He was irritated by the "uncertain shiftiness" of the villains and seemingly longed for a simpler treatment of their characters. Brooks Atkinson in The New York Times identified the authors as the source of his unease with the play: "'Post Road' has given Mr. and Mrs. Steele considerable trouble, which they ungenerously pass on to the audience. Their comedy and their mystery are never on good terms". However, Atkinson also felt Percy Kilbride's comic acting made the play worth seeing.

=== Change of venue ===
The production finished playing at the Theater Masque on February 16, 1935, then moved to the Ambassador Theatre, where its next performance was on February 19, 1935.

=== Change of producer ===
Potter and Haight turned over the producer role to Albert Bannister (Note: Bannister had a niche production company that specialized in taking over successful plays that were starting to fade but still had a good reputation with audiences.) on April 1, 1935. Bannister brought with him Herbert Yost to replace Percy Kilbride.

=== Closing ===
The original Broadway run closed on June 1, 1935, at the Ambassador Theatre after 209 performances.

== Television adaptation ==
In September 1956, CBC Television in Canada produced an adaptation of Post Road as part of their General Motors Theatre anthology series.
