= Wilbur Daniel Steele =

American author and dramatist

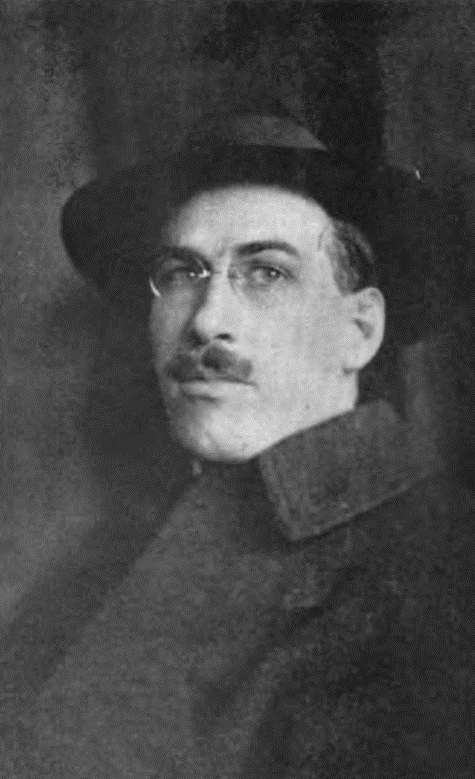
Wilbur Daniel Steele.

Wilbur Daniel Steele (17 March 1886, Greensboro, North Carolina – 26 May 1970, Stamford, Connecticut) was a U.S. author and playwright. He has been called "America's recognised master of the popular short story" between World War I and the Great Depression.

His short stories are set in American locations and are often highly dramatic. Collections of his stories include The Man Who Saw through Heaven (1927), Best Stories (1946), and Full Cargo (1951). He also wrote novels, including Taboo (1925), That Girl from Memphis (1945), and Their Town (1952). His second wife was actress Norma Mitchell, with whom he co-wrote the play The Post Road.

== Works ==
=== Novels ===
- Storm (1914)
- Isles of the Blest (1924)
- Taboo (1925)
- Meat (1928) Republished as The Third Generation (1929)
- Undertow (1930)
- Sound of Rowlocks (1938)
- That Girl from Memphis (1945)
- Diamond Wedding (1950)
- Their Town (1952)
- The Way to the Gold (1955)

=== Short story collections ===
- Land's End and Other Stories (1918)
- The Shame Dance and Other Stories (1923)
- Urkey Island (1926)
- The Man Who Saw Through Heaven and Other Stories (1927)
- Tower of Sand and Other Stories (1929)
- The Best Stories of Wilbur Daniel Steele (1945)
- Full Cargo: More Stories (1951)

=== Plays ===
- Contemporaries, produced 1915.
- Not Smart, produced 1916.
- The Giants' Stair, produced 1924.
- The Terrible Woman and Other One Act Plays, 1925. Also includes Not Smart, Ropes.
- (with Norma Mitchell) Any Woman, produced in August 1934 for one-week run.
- (with Norma Mitchell) Post Road, produced 1934; printed 1935.
- (with Anthony Brown) How Beautiful with Shoes, produced 1935. From the story by Steele.
- Luck, in William Kozlenko (ed.) One Hundred Nonroyalty Plays, 1941.

=== Short stories ===
Title	Publication	Collected in
"On the Ebb Tide"	Success (June 1910)	-
"Gloomy on the Gridiron"	Success (November 1910)	-
"The Insurrecto"	The National Magazine (May 1911)	-
"Pickled Sunshine"	The National Magazine (June 1911)	-
"The Admirable Admirals"	Success (October 1911)	-
"The Old Man's Brother"	The Cavalier (March 16, 1912)	-
"White Horse Winter"	The Atlantic (April 1912)	Land's End and Other Stories
"Thumbs Down"	Harper's Weekly (August 3, 1912)	-
"The Price of Fish"	Metropolitan Magazine (September 1912)	-
"An Officer Born"	The American Magazine (May 1913)	-
"The Islanders"	Harper's Magazine (July 1913)	
"The Stone Man"	Adventure (September 1913)	-
"Orpheus O'Grady"	Adventure (November 1913)	-
"The Handkerchief Lady's Girl"	Harper's Magazine (February 1914)	-
"Captain Ulysses G. Dadd, Retired"	Scribner's Magazine (July 1914)	-
"The Wickedness of Father Veiera"	The Atlantic (July 1914)	-
"The Younger Twin"	Harper's Magazine (August 1914)	-
"Pa-Jim"	Scribner's Magazine (November 1914)	-
"The Miracle"	The Masses (January 1915)	-
"The Yellow Cat"	Harper's Magazine (March 1915)	Land's End and Other Stories
"On Moon Hill"	The Century Magazine (April 1915)	-
"A Matter of Education"	Harper's Magazine (May 1915)	-
"The Real Thing"	The Century Magazine (May 1915)	-
"A Modern Flying Dutchman"	Adventure (May 1915)	-
"'Romance'"	The Atlantic (June 1915)	Land's End and Other Stories
"Heritage"	Harper's Magazine (July 1915)	-
"Free Agent"	Collier's (July 17, 1915)	-
"The Killer's Son"	Harper's Magazine (January 1916)	Land's End and Other Stories
"Before the Mast	Harper's Magazine (March 1916)	-
"Land's End"	Collier's (March 25, 1916)	Land's End and Other Stories
"Down on Their Knees"	Harper's Magazine (July 1916)	Land's End and Other Stories
"The Last Fletcher"	Good Housekeeping (September 1916)	-
"An Escape from Freedom"	Harper's Magazine (October 1916)	-
"A Devil of a Fellow"	The Seven Arts (November 1916)	Land's End and Other Stories
"White Hands"	Pictorial Review (January 1917)	Urkey Island
"The Killers of Provincetown"	Harper's Magazine (March 1917)	-
"Mr. Timmons Tackles Life"	Harper's Magazine (April 1917)	-
"Ching, Ching, Chinaman"	Pictorial Review (June 1917)	Urkey Island
"The Half Ghost"	Harper's Magazine (July 1917)	-
"Free"	The Century Magazine (August 1917)	-
"Ked's Hand"	Harper's Magazine (September 1917)	Land's End and Other Stories
"A Point of Honor"	Harper's Magazine (November 1917)	-
"The Woman at Seven Brothers"	Harper's Magazine (December 1917)	Land's End and Other Stories
"The White Man"	Harper's Magazine (February 1918)	The Shame Dance and Other Stories
"You're Right, At That"	Collier's (February 23, 1918)	-
"The Wages of Sin"	Pictorial Review (March 1918)	Urkey Island
"Always Summer"	Harper's Magazine (April 1918)	The Shame Dance and Other Stories
"Eternal Youth"	Scribner's (April 1918)	-
"The Dark Hour"	The Atlantic (May 1918)	The Best Stories of Wilbur Daniel Steele
"A Man's a Fool"	Metropolitan Magazine (June 1918)	Land's End and Other Stories
"Mr. Scattergood and the Other World"	Harper's Magazine (July 1918)	-
"The Perfect Face"	Harper's Magazine (August 1918)	-
"A Taste of the Old Boy"	Collier's (September 28, 1918)	-
"For Where Is Your Fortune Now?"	Pictorial Review (November 1918)	Tower of Sand and Other Stories
"The Heart of a Woman"	Harper's Magazine (February 1919)	-
"Goodfellow"	Harper's Magazine (April 1919)	-
"'For They Know Not What They Do'"	Pictorial Review (July 1919)	Tower of Sand and Other Stories
"Accomplice After the Fact"	Good Housekeeping (August 1919)	-
"Luck"	Harper's Magazine (August 1919)	The Man Who Saw Through Heaven and Other Stories
"'La Guiablesse'"	Harper's Magazine (September 1919)	The Shame Dance and Other Stories
"Clay and Cloven Hoof"	Harper's Magazine (October 1919)	-
"Out of Exile"	Pictorial Review (November 1919)	Urkey Island
"Both Judge and Jury"	Harper's Magazine (January 1920)	The Shame Dance and Other Stories
"God's Mercy"	Pictorial Review (July 1920)	-
"At Two-in-the-Bush"	Harper's Magazine (October 1920)	The Shame Dance and Other Stories
"Footfalls"	Pictorial Review (October 1920)	Tower of Sand and Other Stories
"The Shame Dance"	Harper's Magazine (December 1920)	The Shame Dance and Other Stories
"Fouled Anchor"	Harper's Magazine (April 1921)	-
"'Toinette of Maisonnoir"	Pictorial Review (July 1921)	-
"A Life"	Pictorial Review (August 1921)	-
"The Marriage in Kairwan"	Harper's Magazine (December 1921)	The Shame Dance and Other Stories
"'He That Hideth His Secret'"	Harper's Magazine (February 1922)	The Shame Dance and Other Stories
"The Mad"	Pictorial Review (July 1922)	Tower of Sand and Other Stories
"From the Other Side of the South"	Pictorial Review (August 1922)	The Shame Dance and Other Stories
"The Anglo-Saxon"	Harper's Magazine (August 1922)	The Shame Dance and Other Stories
"The Man Who Sat"	Pictorial Review (September 1922)	The Shame Dance and Other Stories
"The First Born"	Pictorial Review (December 1922)	-
"'Arab Stuff'"	Harper's Magazine (January 1923)	The Shame Dance and Other Stories
"Crocuses"	Pictorial Review (May 1923)	Urkey Island
"Tower of Sand"	Pictorial Review (June 1923)	Tower of Sand and Other Stories
"Ginger Beer"	Pictorial Review (November 1923)	-
"What Do You Mean—Americans?"	Pictorial Review (April 1924)	The Man Who Saw Through Heaven and Other Stories
"Lost at Sea"	Pictorial Review (May 1924)	Urkey Island
"Marriage"	Pictorial Review (August 1924)	-
"The Thinker"	Pictorial Review (December 1924)	The Man Who Saw Through Heaven and Other Stories
"Sauce for the Goose"	Pictorial Review (January 1925)	-
"Six Dollars"	Pictorial Review (March 1925)	Urkey Island
"When Hell Froze"	Harper's Magazine (May 1925)	The Man Who Saw Through Heaven and Other Stories
"The Man Who Saw Through Heaven"	Harper's Magazine (September 1925)	The Man Who Saw Through Heaven and Other Stories
"Blue Murder"	Harper's Magazine (October 1925)	The Man Who Saw Through Heaven and Other Stories
"Out of the Wind"	Pictorial Review (October 1925)	Urkey Island
"Brother's Keeper"	Harper's Magazine (December 1925)	Full Cargo: More Stories
"Beauty"	Good Housekeeping (January 1926))	-
"The Gray Goose"	Harper's Magazine (March 1926)	Full Cargo: More Stories
"Now I Lay Me"	Pictorial Review (April 1926)	-
"Flesh"	Nash's-Pall Mall (April 1926)	-
"Bubbles"	Harper's Magazine (August 1926)	The Man Who Saw Through Heaven and Other Stories
"Fe-Fi-Fo-Fum"	Pictorial Review (August 1926)	The Man Who Saw Through Heaven and Other Stories
"Autumn Bloom"	Pictorial Review (November 1926)	The Man Who Saw Through Heaven and Other Stories
"A Drink of Water"	Harper's Magazine (January 1927)	The Man Who Saw Through Heaven and Other Stories
"Sailor! Sailor!"	Pictorial Review (July 1927)	The Man Who Saw Through Heaven and Other Stories
"New Deal"	Scribner's Magazine (August 1927)	-
"Sooth"	Harper's Magazine (August 1927)	The Man Who Saw Through Heaven and Other Stories
"Speed"	Pictorial Review (August 1927)	-
"An American Comedy"	Pictorial Review (October 1927)	The Best Stories of Wilbur Daniel Steele
"Mary Drake and Will Todd"	Pictorial Review (March–April 1928)	Tower of Sand and Other Stories
"Lightning"	Pictorial Review (June 1928)	-
"Never Anything That Fades"	Harper's Magazine (June 1928)	Tower of Sand and Other Stories
"'Satan Am a Snake'"	Harper's Magazine (August 1928)	-
"Winter Wheat"	Pictorial Review (September 1928)	-
"From One Generation to Another"	Pictorial Review (October 1928)	-
"The Silver Sword"	Pictorial Review (March 1929)	-
"Survivor"	Pictorial Review (May 1929)	The Best Stories of Wilbur Daniel Steele
"Pioneers"	Harper's Magazine (July 1929)	-
"Quicksilver"	Harper's Magazine (August 1929)	-
"Surprize"	Pictorial Review (September 1929)	-
"Conjuh"	Pictorial Review (October 1929)	The Best Stories of Wilbur Daniel Steele
"In the Shade of the Tree"	Harper's Magazine (January 1930)	The Best Stories of Wilbur Daniel Steele
"'Ki'"	Pictorial Review (February 1930)	-
"Wife of a Viking"	Pictorial Review (April 1930)	-
"'Can't Cross Jordan By Myself'"	Pictorial Review (August 1930)	The Best Stories of Wilbur Daniel Steele
"Diamond Wedding"	Woman's Home Companion (September 1930)	-
"Green Vigil"	Ladies' Home Journal (September 1930)	-
"Light"	Ladies' Home Journal (November 1930)	-
"The Hills of Heaven"	Good Housekeeping (January 1931)	-
"Renegade"	Ladies' Home Journal (February 1931)	Full Cargo: More Stories
"The Body of the Crime"	Ladies' Home Journal (March 1931)	The Best Stories of Wilbur Daniel Steele
"Daughter of the Soil"	Pictorial Review (March 1931)	-
"Man Without a God" aka "Man and Boy"	Ladies' Home Journal (November 1931)	Full Cargo: More Stories
"Conscience" aka "Two Seconds"	Pictorial Review (January 1932)	Full Cargo: More Stories
"Twenty-Seven Minutes"	Ladies' Home Journal (April 1932)	-
"By Appointment"	The Saturday Evening Post (July 2, 1932)	Full Cargo: More Stories
"How Beautiful With Shoes"	Harper's Magazine (August 1932)	The Best Stories of Wilbur Daniel Steele
"Where There's Smoke"	Ladies' Home Journal (October 1932)	-
"Will and Bill"	Ladies' Home Journal (January 1933)	-
"Somebody"	Harper's Bazaar (November 1933)	-
"Landfall"	Liberty (January 12, 1935)	-
"Son of His Father"	The Saturday Evening Post (October 12, 1935)	-
"The Second Mrs. Brown"	Collier's (February 6, 1937)	-
"Due North"	Cosmopolitan (June 1937)	The Best Stories of Wilbur Daniel Steele
"The Black Road"	Collier's (June 3, 1939)	Full Cargo: More Stories
"Baptism"	Good Housekeeping (August 1939)	-
"Isles of Spice and Lilies"	The Atlantic (February 1940)	The Best Stories of Wilbur Daniel Steele
"Through Road"	Collier's (March 16, 1940)	-
"A Life Is So Little"	Good Housekeeping (October 1940)	-
"Prescription for Success"	Woman's Home Companion (May 1942)	-
"Her Hand in Marriage"	Cosmopolitan (July 1943)	-
"The Crowning Divorce"	Cosmopolitan (November 1943)	-
"The Crystal-Gazer's Daughter"	Good Housekeeping (January 1944)	-
"The Boston Story"	Cosmopolitan (April 1944)	-
"Deep Waters"	Life Story (August 1944)	-
"A Bath in the Sea"	The Best Stories of Wilbur Daniel Steele (1945)	The Best Stories of Wilbur Daniel Steele
"The Untamed"	Argosy (June 1946)	-
"Dust to Dust"	Ellery Queen's Mystery Magazine (November 1949)	-
"A Way With Women" aka "The Lady-Killer"	Ellery Queen's Mystery Magazine (July 1950)	Full Cargo: More Stories
"The Little Wheel"	Nero Wolfe Mystery Magazine (January 1954)	-
"Man Trap"	Argosy (February 1956)	-
"The Bogeyman"	The Magazine of Fantasy & Science Fiction (October 1958)	-
