= Norma Mitchell =

American actress and writer (1884–1967)

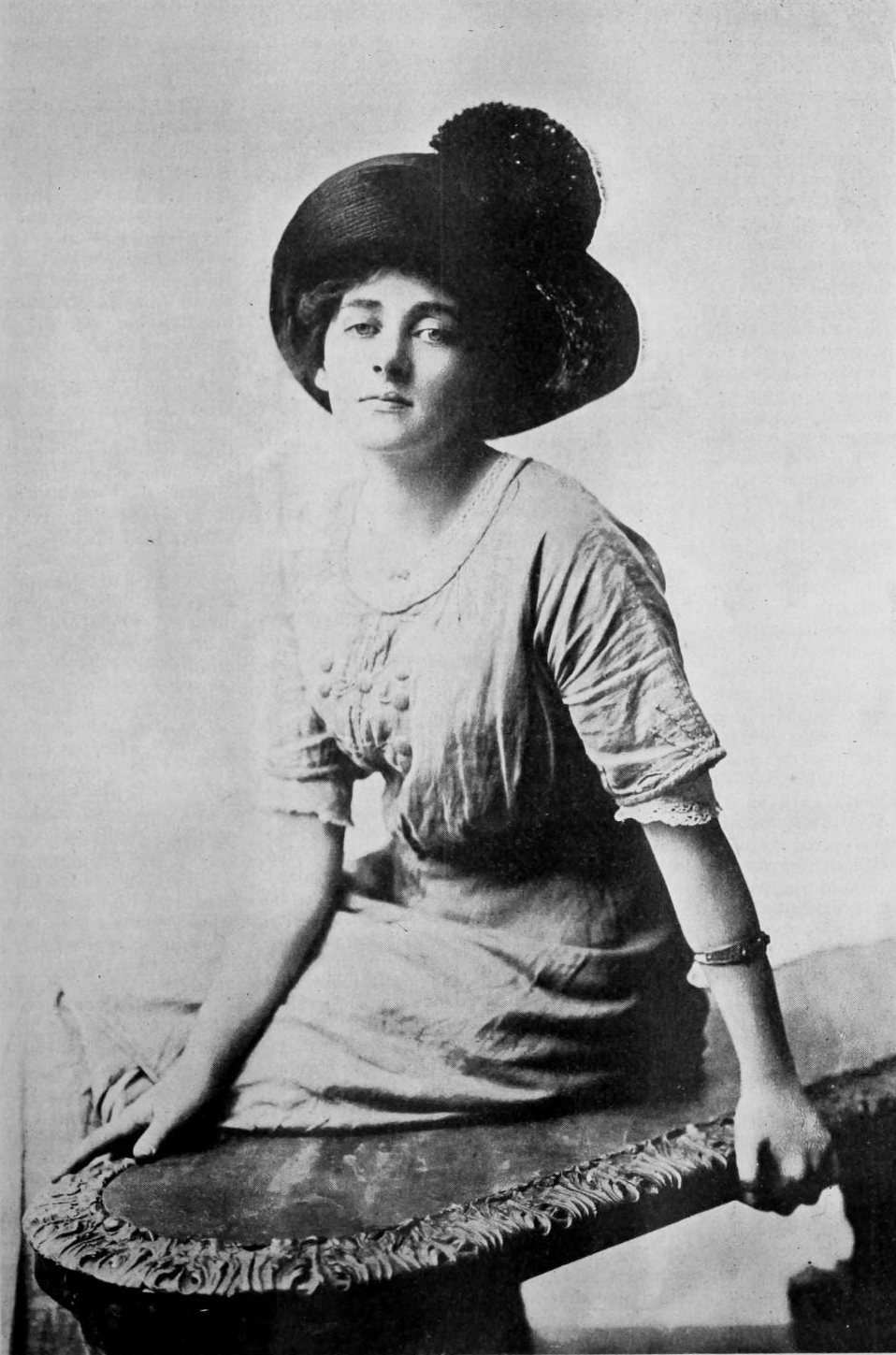
- Mitchell c. 1910
- Born: Norma Stafford Mitchell; May 8, 1884; Eastham, Massachusetts
- Died: May 29, 1967 (aged 83); Greenwich, Connecticut
- Other names: Norma Steele, Norma Talbot (married names)
- Occupations: Actress, writer
- Notable work: Cradle Snatchers (1925), Post Road (1934)
- Spouse(s): Wilbur Daniel Steele, Hayden Talbot

Norma Stafford Mitchell (May 8, 1884 – May 29, 1967) was an American actress and writer.

== Early life ==
Mitchell was born in Eastham, Massachusetts, the daughter of George William Mitchell and Mary Louisa Horton Mitchell. Her father was a mining engineer.

== Career ==
Mitchell's stage career began with a stock theater company directed by John Craig in Boston.

Mitchell appeared in Broadway comedies, including The Call of the Cricket (1910), The Truth Wagon (1912), Her Husband's Wife (1917), March Hares (1921), To the Ladies (1922), The Goldfish (1922), Why Not? (1922), The New Poor (1924), and Dancing Mothers (1924). She also acted in the films The Woman Accused (1933), Melody in Spring (1934), and Susan and God (1940).

Mitchell wrote Cradle Snatchers (1925) with Russell G. Medcraft, a comedy starring Mary Boland, Edna May Oliver, and a young Humphrey Bogart; it was adapted for the screen three times, as Cradle Snatchers (1927), as Why Leave Home? (1929), and as Cole Porter's musical Let's Face It (1943). Mitchell and Medcraft collaborated again in writing Buy, Buy, Baby (1926). Mitchell also wrote a sketch, "Her Morning Bath", made popular in 1926 by vaudeville star Charlotte Greenwood.

Mitchell and her second husband cowrote the plays Any Woman (1934) and Post Road (1934–1935), "a stubborn but not untalented play that refuses to make its peace with the theatre", according to critic Brooks Atkinson. Post Road was adapted for television in 1952 for Robert Montgomery Presents, and again in 1956 for Encounter. Her final play on Broadway was Autumn Hill (1942), written with John Harris.

== Personal life ==
Mitchell married twice. Her first husband was journalist and playwright Hayden Talbot, father of editor Betsy Blackwell; they married in 1913 and divorced in 1921. Her second husband was writer Wilbur Daniel Steele; they married in 1932, in London. Steele survived her when she died in Greenwich, Connecticut in 1967, aged 83 years.
