= Decision fatigue =

Process of decline in quality of decisions over time

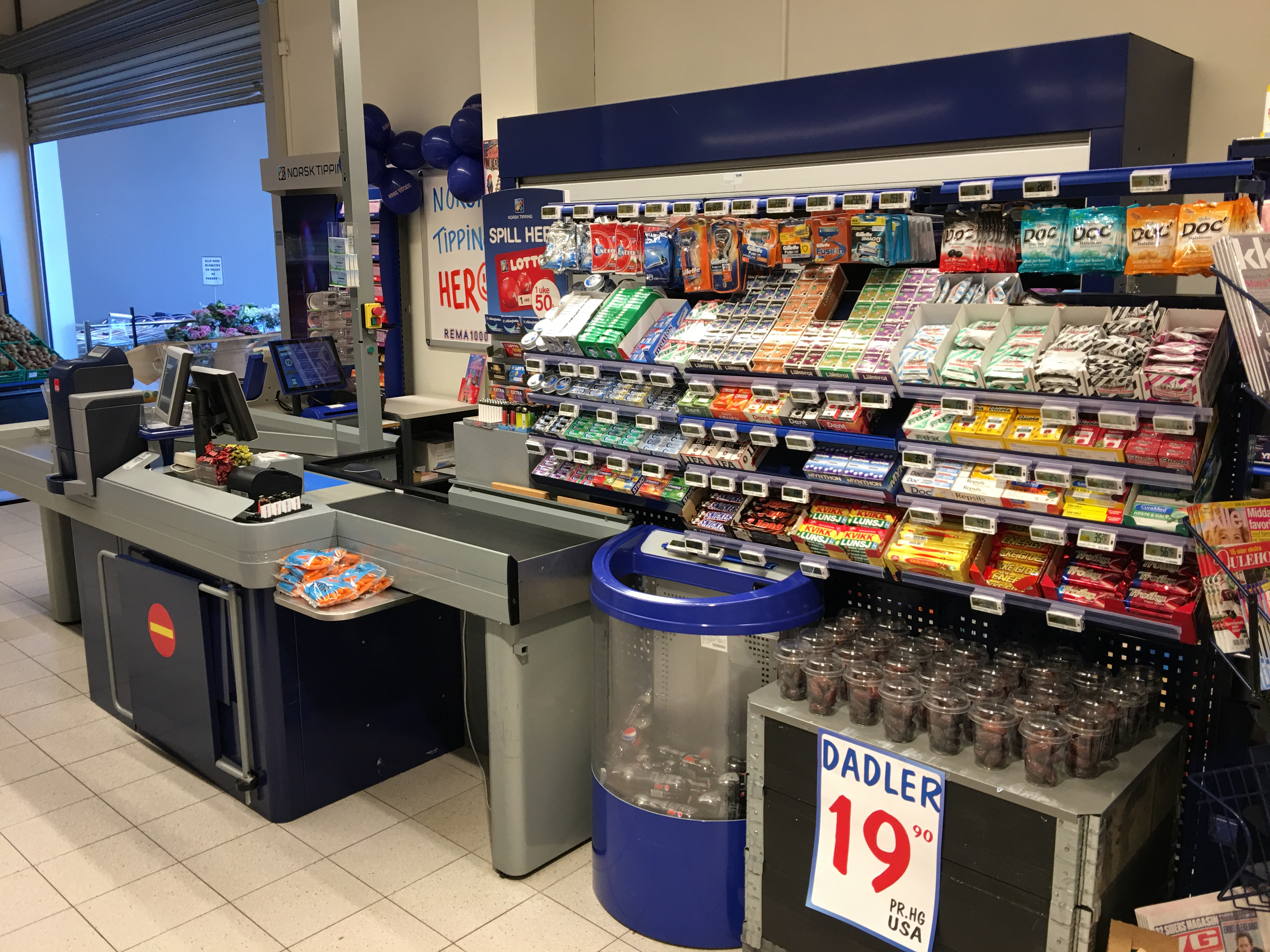
Candy and snacks are placed close to market cash registers, to take advantage of shoppers' decision fatigue at the end of their shopping.

In decision making and psychology, decision fatigue refers to the deteriorating quality of decisions made by an individual after a long session of decision making. It is now understood as one of the causes of irrational trade-offs in decision making. Decision fatigue may also lead to consumers making poor choices with their purchases.

There is a paradox in that "people who lack choices seem to want them and often will fight for them", yet at the same time, "people find that making many choices can be [psychologically] aversive."

For example, major politicians and businessmen such as former United States President Barack Obama, Steve Jobs, and Mark Zuckerberg have been known to reduce their everyday clothing down to one or two outfits in order to limit the number of decisions they make in a day.

== Definition and context ==
Decision fatigue is a phrase popularised by John Tierney, and is the tendency for peoples' decision making to become impaired as a result of having recently taken multiple decisions.

Decision fatigue has been hypothesised to be a symptom, or a result of ego depletion. It differs from mental fatigue which describes the psychobiological state that results from a prolonged duration of demanding cognitive tasks, such as multi-tasking or switching between various tasks.

Some psychologists and economists use the term to describe impairments in decision making resulting specifically from a long duration of having to make decisions. Others view factors such as complexity of the decisions being made, repeated acts of self regulation, physiological fatigue, and sleep deprivation as implicated in the emergence of decision fatigue.

Decision fatigue is thought to be a result of unconscious, psychobiological processes, and is a reaction to sustained cognitive, emotional and decisional load, as opposed to a trait or deficiency. Decision fatigue is an emergent construct that has several possible applications in the fields of healthcare psychology, behavioural economics and healthcare policy.

== Characteristics ==
=== Behavioural ===
Behavioural attributes of decision fatigue tend to reflect an underlying state of ego depletion and may symbolise an unconscious method whereby individuals adapt their behaviour to prevent further depletion. Individuals experiencing decision fatigue are more prone to avoidant behaviours, such as procrastination; Sjastad and Baumeister demonstrated that decision fatigued individuals are less willing to engage in planning, and were more avoidant, compared to controls. Decision fatigue may also induce passive behaviours, such as inaction and decision avoidance. Furthermore, individuals experiencing decision fatigue may display less persistence when putting effort into decision making, and thus may be prone to choosing the 'default' option. They may also be prone to impulsive, erratic or short-sighted behaviour.

=== Cognitive ===
Decision fatigue may also alter cognitive functioning. Some studies suggest that decision fatigue impairs cognitive abilities, especially executive functioning and reasoning abilities. For example Kathleen Vohs and Roy Baumeister found that the more that people had made frequent and deliberate choices, the less able they were to persist on a math task, regardless of how tired they were or how long they spent on the task.

=== Physiological ===
There is evidence to suggest that decision fatigue may impact physiological endurance and self control. This was demonstrated in a series of studies which showed that participants who had made a long series of choices were less able to tolerate a bad-tasting drink, and were less able to tolerate pain, compared to controls. This indicates that decision fatigue impairs physiological as well as cognitive self-control.

== Effects ==
=== Reduced ability to make trade-offs ===
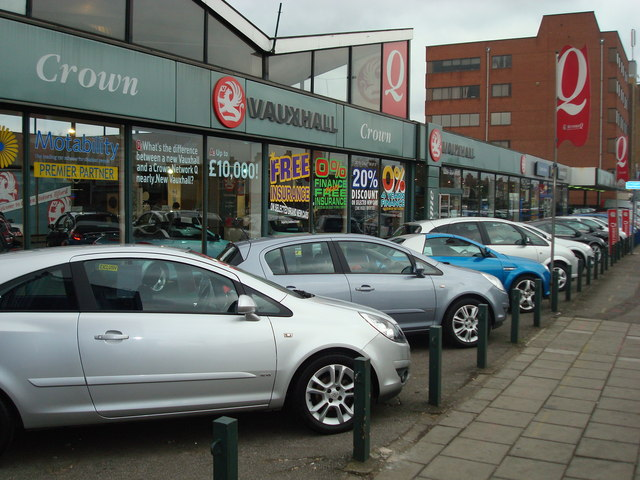
When consumers visit car dealerships, they may feel overwhelmed by all of the different financing, upgrades, and warranty options.

Trade-offs, where either of two choices have positive and negative elements, are an advanced and energy-consuming form of decision making. A person who is mentally depleted becomes reluctant to make trade-offs, or makes very poor choices. Jonathan Levav at Stanford University designed experiments showing how decision fatigue can leave a person vulnerable to sales and marketing strategies designed to time the sale. "Decision fatigue helps explain why ordinarily sensible people...can't resist the dealer's offer to rustproof their new car."

Dean Spears of Princeton University has argued that decision fatigue caused by the constant need to make financial trade-offs is a major factor in trapping people in poverty. Given that financial situations force the poor to make so many trade-offs, they are left with less mental energy for other activities. "If a trip to the supermarket induces more decision fatigue in the poor than in the rich – because each purchase requires more mental trade-offs – by the time they reach the cash register, they'll have less willpower left to resist the Mars bars and Skittles. Not for nothing are these items called impulse purchases."

=== Decision avoidance ===
Decision fatigue can lead people to avoid decisions entirely, a phenomenon called "decision avoidance". In the formal approach to decision quality management, specific techniques have been devised to help managers cope with decision fatigue. Other forms of decision avoidance used to bypass trade-offs and the emotional costs of decision making can include selecting either the default, or status quo options, where these are available.

=== Impaired self-regulation ===
The "process of choosing may itself drain some of the self's precious resources, thereby leaving the executive function less capable of carrying out its other activities. Decision fatigue can therefore impair self-regulation". "[S]ome degree of failure at self regulation" is at the root of "[m]ost major personal and social problems", such as debt, "underachievement at work and school" and lack of exercise.

Experiments have shown the interrelationship between decision fatigue and ego depletion, whereby a person's ability for self-control against impulses decreases in the face of decision fatigue.

Baumeister and Vohs have suggested that the disastrous failure of men in high office to control impulses in their private lives may at times be attributed to decision fatigue stemming from the burden of day-to-day decision making. Similarly, Tierney notes that "C.F.O.s [are] prone to disastrous dalliances late in the evening", after a long day of decision-making.

With regard to self-regulation in legal regulation: One research study found that the decisions judges make are strongly influenced by how long it has been since their last break. "We find that the percentage of favorable rulings drops gradually from ≈65% to nearly zero within each decision session and returns abruptly to ≈65% after a break."

=== Susceptibility to decision making biases ===
Several studies have indicated that decision fatigue can increase reliance on mental shortcuts and biases.

A study by Shai Danziger, Jonathan Levav, and Liora Avnaim-Pesso from Columbia Business School showed that the percentage of favourable rulings by judges on parole boards in a prison dropped gradually (from around 65% to almost 0%) within each 'decision session' recorded, but would return to around 65% after a break. This suggests that judicial rulings were increasingly determined by biased assumptions as decision fatigue increased.

Another demonstration of the relationship between decision fatigue and increased susceptibility to biased decision making was that of journal editors reviewing manuscripts. This study found that when the number of manuscripts discussed per meeting increased from 10 - 19 to over 20, the rate of rejection increased from 38% to 44%. When the number of manuscripts an editor had to read a day increased from 1-2 to 3 or more, the number of manuscripts rejected without peer review increased by 6%. This indicates that the greater decision fatigue editors experienced (whether alone or working in collaboration), the greater their bias towards rejecting manuscripts emerged.

Decision fatigue increases consumers' reliance on cognitive biases, such as anchoring and framing effects, making them more prone to quick, biased choices under conditions of mental exhaustion.

=== Decisional conflict and regret ===
Individuals experiencing decision fatigue may feel a greater degree of decisional conflict. Decisional conflict is a state wherein an individual is uncertain about which course of action to take when the decision between various options involves regret, risk or challenge to their values. Decisional conflict is likely to arise from decision fatigue because decision fatigue impairs one's ability to make decisions efficiently, makes them prone to over-reliance on heuristics and biases, reduces one's ability to make trade-offs, and can even lead to avoiding making decisions.

Decision fatigue might also increase levels of decisional regret. If an individual is aware that their decision-making abilities are impaired, or if they are experiencing decisional conflict as a result of decision fatigue, they may anticipate the regret they can experience as a result of post-decisional feedback on the outcomes they didn't choose. This anticipation of regret may influence decision making, and can further impair the individual's ability to make rational decisions.

This relationship between decisional fatigue, regret, and conflict was demonstrated in a recent study that aimed to find the impacts of decision fatigue on nurses working during the COVID-19 pandemic. Researchers concluded that decision fatigue could be a determinant of psychological outcomes among nurses, and clinical outcomes among patients and their family members. Additionally, the decisional conflict and regret that arises from decision fatigue may impact the mental health and the decision making ability of healthcare workers, and those in occupations that demand long decision-making sessions.

=== Impact on consumer behavior ===
In marketing, too much choice can be a problem. Stores and websites sometimes offer hundreds of similar products, but too much choice can make customers confused and less happy with their shopping experience. Because of that, many companies try to make the process easier by highlighting some options or categorizing items. Options like "best choice," "most bought," or "recommended for you" are common ways to help people decide more easily when they feel tired of deciding. People who experience Decision fatigue also tend to choose a brand they already know instead of trying new ones. This is because it feels safe and simple, so they don’t need to spend energy or think too much. For example, after looking at many products, a customer might simply pick the brand they already know. Over time, this behavior can make brand loyalty stronger.

Decision fatigue also happens more strongly in online shopping and social media. When users scroll through social media, every page shows new ads, links, and offers to encourage people to purchase. All this information causes mental overload, and people may stop making decisions or rely on fast and automatic choices. Designers and marketers try to fix this problem to make digital experiences simpler. They organize websites in a way that reduces the number of steps needed to buy something or to complete a task. Clean websites, easy menus, and short steps help save energy and reduce mental effort. This kind of design helps users feel more comfortable and confident, especially when they are tired from making many small decisions. Also, when people are tired, they respond to feelings more easily than logic. Because of that, emotional ads that include love, happiness, or sadness can be more impressive. Many brands use warm, friendly images or short, impressive slogans to avoid requiring too much thinking and only make customers feel good about their choice.

=== Impulse purchasing ===
Decision fatigue can influence irrational impulse purchases at supermarkets. During a trip to the supermarket, trade-off decisions regarding prices and promotions can produce decision fatigue, hence by the time the shopper reaches the cash register, less willpower remains to resist impulse purchases of candy and sugared items. Sweet snacks are usually featured at the cash register because many shoppers have decision fatigue by the time they get there. Florida State University social psychologist Roy Baumeister has also found that it is directly tied to low glucose levels, and that replenishing them restores the ability to make effective decisions. This has been offered as an explanation for why poor shoppers are more likely to eat during their trips.

== Criticisms ==
=== Lack of replicability of ego depletion ===
Several psychologists have challenged the effects of ego depletion, such as decision fatigue, on multiple grounds. One replication effort including 23 laboratories did not find an ego depletion effect to be significantly different from zero. This indicates that existing evidence may not be sufficient to support the existence of an ego depletion effect. Furthermore, even when an ego depletion effect does replicate, there is substantive heterogeneity in the effect size in the literature and the average effect size is small. As there is little evidence for ego depletion, then the existence of decision fatigue comes into question.

=== Self-fulfilling prophecy ===
Stanford University Professor of Psychology Carol Dweck found "that while decision fatigue does occur, it primarily affects those who believe that willpower runs out quickly." She states that "people get fatigued or depleted after a taxing task only when they believe that willpower is a limited resource, but not when they believe it's not so limited". She notes that "in some cases, the people who believe that willpower is not so limited actually perform better after a taxing task."

== See also ==
- Analysis paralysis
- Ego depletion
- Fatigue (medical)
- Interruption science
- Somnolence
