= PixelBlocks =

Construction toy

PixelBlocks are small plastic blocks that are representative of pixels. They can be linked together to form both 2-D and 3-D shapes, and come in 20 different colors. They are made by PixelBlocks Inc.

== Construction ==
PixelBlocks are roughly 3/8" (0.9 cm) square and translucent. Their edges are grooved so that the blocks can be linked to each other, much like a jigsaw puzzle. There are three ways to link the blocks: linking two pieces so their edges line up (a side lock), linking them so, and putting one block on top of the other (peg-and-hole). These three types of link allow for both 2-D and 3-D structures to be created.

== History ==
PixelBlocks were introduced at the American International Toy Fair on February 26, 2003. They had strong early sales, with 40% of retail accounts placing reorders. The president of PixelBlocks, Aaron Rincover, was "quite pleased" with early sales. PixelBlocks was the recipient of Child's “Best Toys of the Year” award and named a Toy Wishes’ “Great Innovation”. It also obtained a “Toy Tips Trusted” five-star rating, a Creative Child “Seal of Excellence” award, and a “Seal of Approval” honor from the National Parenting Center. The toy is no longer in production.
