= Cowboy cookies =

Type of drop cookie

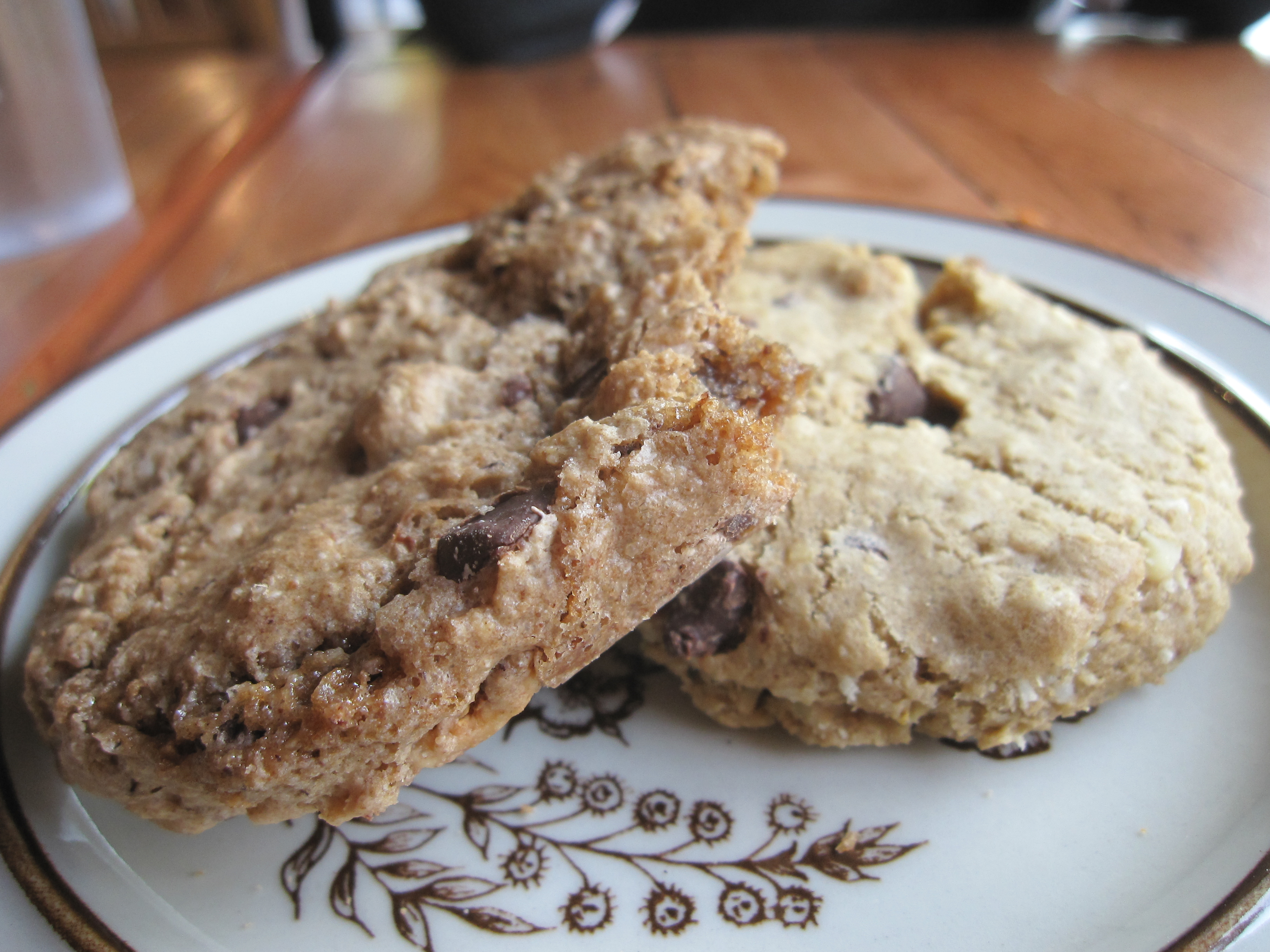
- Plate of cowboy cookies
- Type: Cookie
- Course: Dessert
- Region or state: United States of America
- Main ingredients: Oatmeal, chocolate chips, pecans, coconut

Cowboy cookies are a type of drop cookie made with oatmeal, chocolate chips, pecans, and coconut.

== History ==
The origins of "cowboy cookies" are unknown although they have been variously attributed to Texas or the Old West. The story that describes them in originating in the Old West claims that they were eaten by cowboys as a high energy snack that could be easily carried. The dessert is also associated with the state of Wyoming.

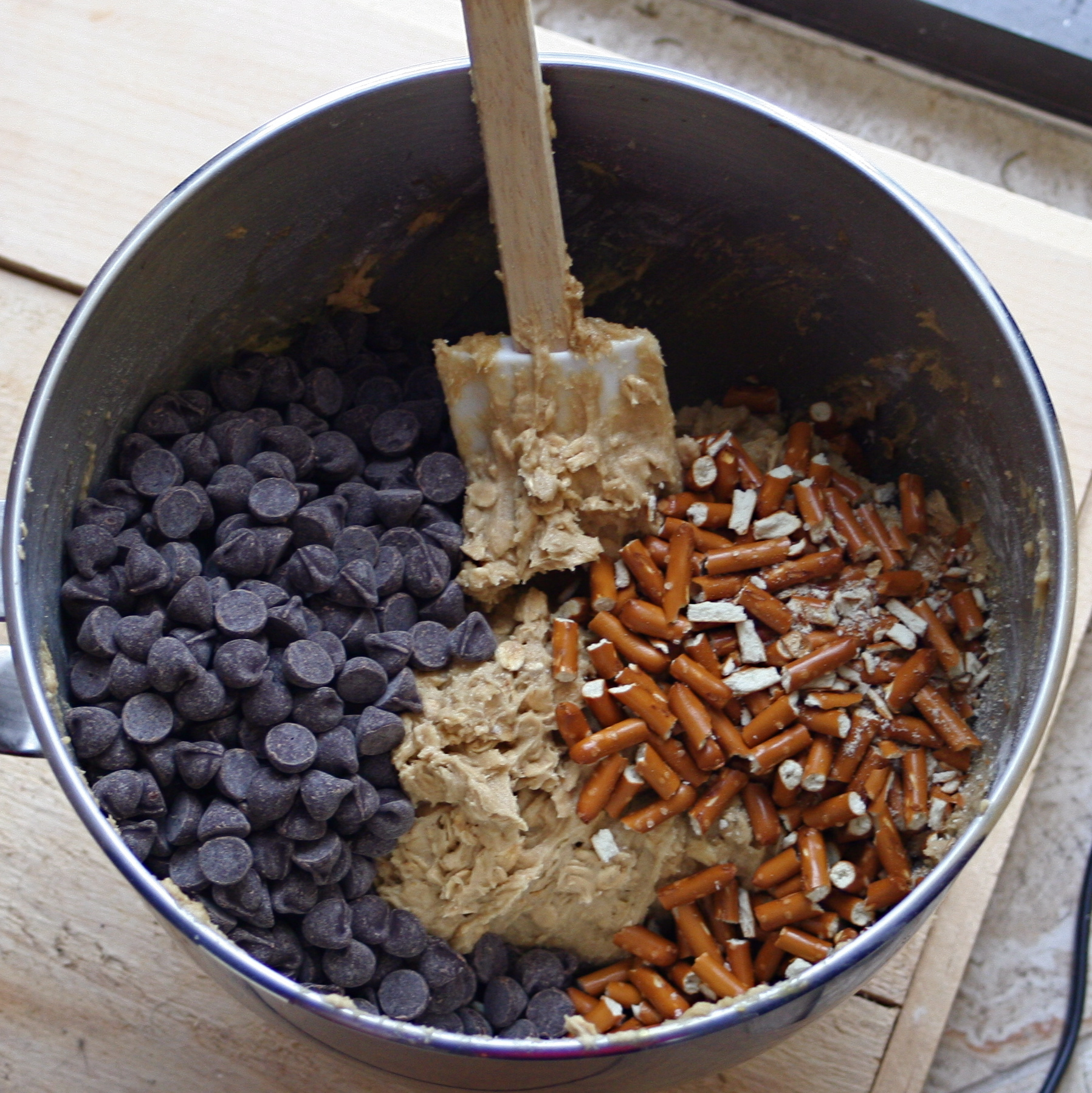
Cowboy cookie dough with chocolate chips and pretzels ready to be mixed in.

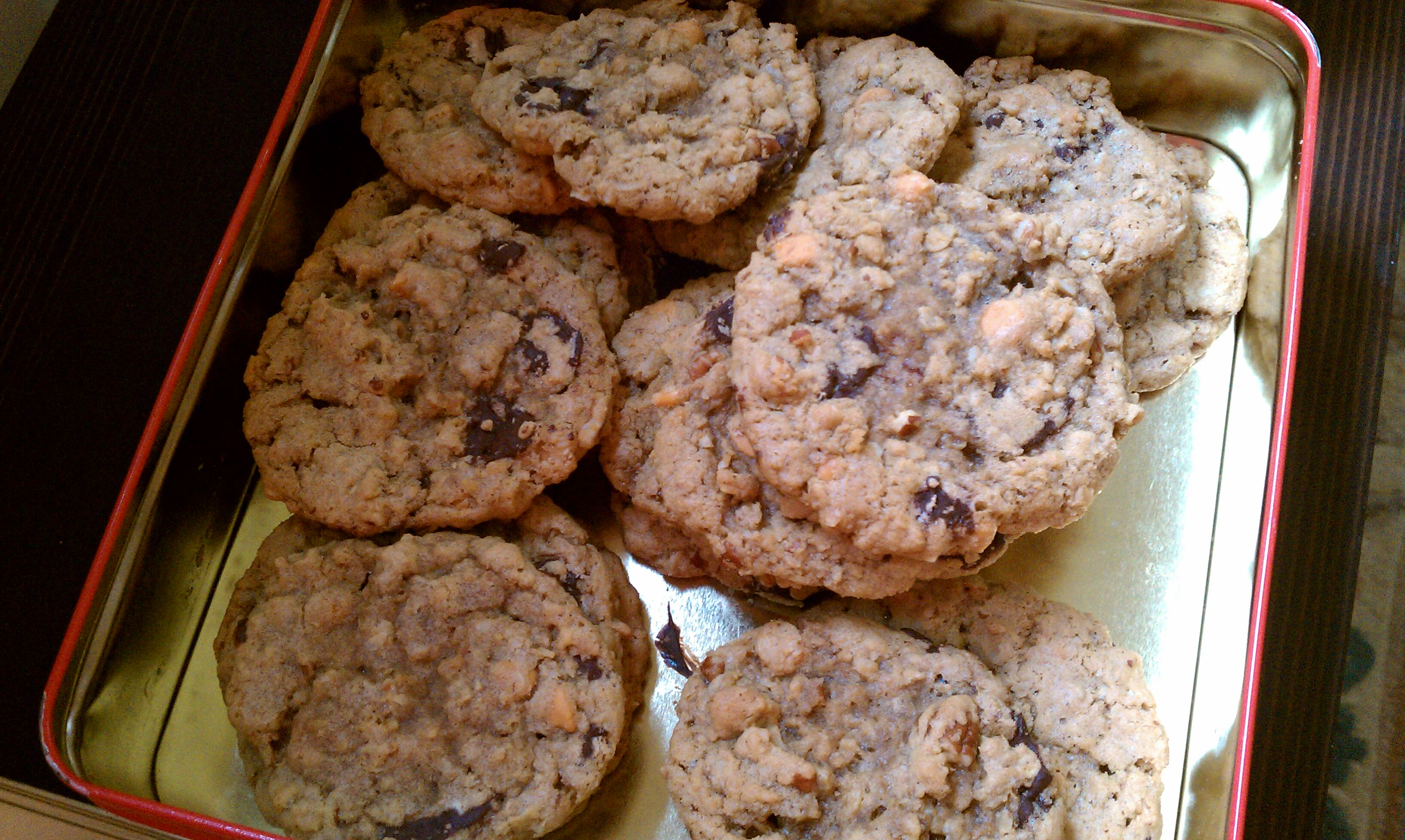
A tin of cowboy cookies.

Cowboy cookies were further popularized when First Lady Laura Bush baked "Texas Governor's Mansion Cowboy Cookies" for the First Lady Bake-Off during her husband George W. Bush's campaign for the 2000 United States presidential election. As part of the competition, the recipe was printed in Family Circle, the publication which held the contest. They ultimately beat Tipper Gore's recipe for ginger snap cookies. An article by Marian Burros in The New York Times noted that Family Circle had increased the cooking time in the recipe from the 10 to 12 minutes suggested by Laura Bush to 17 to 20 minutes, causing them to be burnt. Burros also described Gore's cookies as superior, and stated that they only lost because they lacked chocolate and were not as "flashy". Bush submitted her recipe for cowboy cookies again in the 2004 bakeoff and beat Teresa Kerry's pumpkin spice cookies.

== Description ==
Cowboy cookies typically include a variety of rich ingredients, including oatmeal, chocolate, pecans and shredded coconut. The dough typically includes flour, sugar, eggs, butter and vanilla. Some variations include pieces of hard pretzels.
