= Ego depletion =

Psychological theory

Ego depletion is the idea that self-control or willpower draws upon conscious mental resources that can be taxed to exhaustion when in constant use with no reprieve (with the word "ego" used in the psychoanalytic sense rather than the colloquial sense).

The theory proposes that when the energy for mental activity is low, self-control is typically impaired, which would be considered a state of ego depletion. In particular, experiencing a state of ego depletion impairs the ability to control oneself later on. A depleting task requiring self-control can have a hindering effect on a subsequent self-control task, even if the tasks are seemingly unrelated. Ego depletion is therefore a critical topic in experimental psychology, specifically social psychology, because it is a mechanism that contributes to the understanding of the processes of human self-control. There have both been studies to support and to question the validity of ego-depletion as a theory.

Some meta-analyses and studies have questioned the size and existence of the ego depletion effect. The ultimate validity and conclusions of those later studies are not universally agreed upon. Martin Hagger and Nikos Chatzisrantis, whose 2010 meta-analysis seemed to support the existence of the ego depletion effect, subsequently performed a pre-registered 23-lab replication study that did not find an ego-depletion effect.

== Early experimental evidence ==
American social psychologist Roy Baumeister and his colleagues proposed a model that described self-control like a muscle, which can become both strengthened and fatigued. The researchers proposed that initial use of the "muscle" of self-control could cause a decrease in strength, or ego depletion, for subsequent tasks. Later experimental findings showed support for this muscle model of self-control and ego depletion.

An experiment by Baumeister, Ellen Bratslavsky, Mark Muraven, and Dianne Tice in 1998, demonstrated some of the first evidence that ego depletion had effects in diverse contexts or situations. They showed that people who initially resisted the temptation of chocolates were subsequently less able to persist on a difficult and frustrating puzzle task. They attributed this effect to ego depletion, which resulted from the prior resisting of a tempting treat. Additionally, it was demonstrated that when people voluntarily gave a speech that included beliefs contrary to their own, they were also less able to persist on the difficult puzzle, indicating a state of ego depletion. This effect was not nearly as strong when individuals were not given a choice and were "forced" to write a counter-attitudinal speech. Thus, they proposed that both the act of choice and counter-attitudinal behaviors draw upon the same pool of limited resources. While giving a counter-attitudinal speech is expected to produce ego depletion, introducing the element of choice further increases the level of experienced depletion. These findings demonstrated the effects of ego depletion in differential situations and emphasized that ego depletion may not be context-specific. The experiment drew together earlier proposals of a strength model of willpower into a single experimental paradigm. With this study, Baumeister and his colleagues therefore provided the first direct experimental evidence of ego depletion, and initiated research interest on the subject.

== Physiological causes ==
The role of glucose as a specific form of energy needed for self-control has been explored by researchers. Glucose, a sugar found in many foods, is the primary fuel for the body and the brain. Multiple experiments have connected self-control depletion to reduced blood glucose, and suggested that self-control performance could be replenished by consuming glucose. Some of the findings were later questioned. However, several experiments have found that resource depletion effects can be reversed by simply tasting (but not swallowing or consuming) sweet beverages, which can have rewarding properties. Others have suggested that the taste of sugar (but not artificial sweetener) has psycho-physiological signaling effects.

A 2007 experiment by Segertrom and Nes found HRV (heart rate variability) to be a marker for ego depletion as well as an index for self-control power before the task.

Neural activity associated with self-control failure has been examined using neurophysiological techniques. According to cognitive and neuroscientific models of mental control, a "conflict-monitoring/error-detection system" identifies discrepancies between intended goals and actual behaviors. Error-related negativity (ERN) signals are a waveform of event-related potentials, which appear to be generated in the anterior cingulate cortex when individuals commit errors in various psychological tasks. Using electroencephalography (EEG) recordings, Inzlicht and Gutsell found that individuals who had undergone an emotion-suppression task displayed weaker ERN signals compared to individuals who had not undergone emotion-suppression tasks. Inzlicht and Gutsell interpreted this pattern as evidence that self-control exertion can weaken neural mechanisms linked to conflict monitoring.

The majority of ego depletion studies have been carried out on university students, which raises concerns about how generalizable the results really are. Dahm and colleagues (2011) reported that adults over 40 did not show depletion effects in a standard manipulation, while younger university students did, and suggested that ongoing maturation of self-control brain regions could contribute to this difference.

== Manifestations ==
=== Guilt and prosocial behavior ===
Ego depletion has also been implicated in guilt and prosocial behavior. The feeling of guilt, while unpleasant, is necessary to facilitate adaptive human interactions. The experience of guilt is dependent on one's ability to reflect on past actions and behaviors. Ego depletion has been shown to hinder the ability to engage in such reflection, thereby making it difficult to experience guilt. Since guilt typically leads to prosocial behavior, ego depletion will therefore reduce the good deeds that often result from a guilty conscience. In the study by Xu and colleagues, some participants were required to suppress their emotions while watching a movie about butchering animals, which resulted in a depleted state. Participants were then induced to feel guilty by playing a game in which an opponent player was blasted with loud, unpleasant noises when they made errors. At the end of the experiment, participants were given a chance to leave money for a subsequent participant and were also given the choice of making a charitable donation. These were the measures of pro-social behavior. The results of this study indicated that people who experienced ego depletion felt less guilty and donated less money than non-depleted people. This demonstrates that ego depletion has an indirect effect on prosocial behavior by decreasing one's ability to experience guilt. This study however does not account for alternative variables. For example, what if people who did not donate money did this due to being shocked and uncomfortable. These unique feelings that they may not feel all the time could have thrown off their natural philanthropic response to donate. Perhaps these individuals were taught through ethnic or familial culture that donating is not important. These objections are not the same as ego depletion, and it is important to remember that everyone has nuances. Take these findings with a grain of salt.

=== Perceived levels of fatigue ===
An individual's perceived level of fatigue has been shown to influence their subsequent performance on a task requiring self-regulation, independent of their actual state of depletion. Clarkson and colleagues (2010) termed this effect "illusory fatigue." This was shown in an experiment in which participants engaged in a task that was either depleting or non-depleting, which determined each individual's true state of depletion. Ultimately, when participants were led to believe their level of depletion was lower than their true state of depletion, they performed much worse on a difficult working memory task. This indicates that an increased perceived level of fatigue can hinder self-regulatory performance independent of the actual state of depletion.

=== Motivation and beliefs ===
Studies have associated ego depletion with short-term impairments in self-regulation. These effects can, however, be temporarily buffered by external motivations and beliefs in unlimited willpower. An example of such an external motivator was demonstrated by Boucher and Kofos in 2012, where depleted participants who were reminded of money performed better on a subsequent self-control task.

An experiment by Carol Dweck and subsequent work by Roy Baumeister and Kathleen Vohs have shown that beliefs in unlimited self-control help mitigate ego depletion for a short while, but not for long. Participants that were led to believe that they would not get fatigued performed well on a second task but were fully depleted on a third task.

== Real-life implications ==
=== Dieting ===
An experiment performed by Kathleen Vohs and Todd Heatherton demonstrated how ego depletion is particularly relevant when considering chronic dieters compared to non-dieters. Chronic dieters constantly work at resisting their cravings and limiting their food intake. Vohs and Heatherton showed that the task of regulating food intake could be undermined in the face of tempting snacks, especially when the individual was experiencing a state of ego depletion. Both dieters and non-dieters attempted to suppress their emotional responses while watching a movie. Afterwards, participants were required to consume ice cream in order to engage in a taste test. The major finding was that dieters who suppressed their emotional responses to the movie experienced more ego depletion than those who were not required to suppress their emotions. Additionally, those individuals subsequently ate much more ice cream in the taste-testing task. Non-dieters did not show the same self-regulatory failures as dieters in these tasks. Therefore, it seems that the act of dieting itself is a form of resource expenditure.

=== Athletic performance ===
Research has found that competitive athletes' mental determination can be hindered after completing a difficult cognitive task more than after completing an easy cognitive task. This indicates that the hindering effects of ego depletion can be applied not only to subsequent performance on cognitive tasks, but on physical tasks, as well.

=== Consumer behavior ===
In the world of consumerism, individuals are faced with decisions and choices that require the use of valuable energy resources in order to make informed purchases while resisting the temptation of impulsive or unnecessary purchases. Consumers are constantly bombarded with a broad range of options. In order to make the best choice, one must compare the many different aspects of various products. The complexity of consumer decisions in itself can result in ego depletion. This, in turn, could impact any subsequent decisions consumers must make. When consumers are depleted, they are more likely to become passive and make impulsive decisions that may not align with their true values.

Consumers are faced with choices of different price ranges and product qualities in the market. Having many options can make consumers feel overwhelmed, causing ego depletion. Advertisements telling consumers how they deserve and must have a product can cause mental fatigue and frustration, leading people to give in to buying a product. Fatigue and frustration can also stem from deals with specific requirements on ways to purchase a product, along with spending effort on deciding which store has the best deals or trying to get to the store. People will then be led to buy the higher-priced or cheapest product.

Consumers who have low self-control are susceptible to be more invested in obtaining products of high status. These same consumers are more likely to be more motivated, persistent, and willing to pay more for a product. Doing so will lead consumers to have a sense of empowerment; they will feel in control again, as though they were overcoming their ego-depleted states. They may also be led to purchase a brand that has a high status, under the assumption that the brand is better.

== Relief ==
A 2007 experiment reported that inducing a positive mood can buffer the impairing effects of ego depletion on subsequent performance. Positive mood was induced by getting individuals to watch comedy videos or by giving them a surprise gift. Positive mood seemed to allow people to recover faster from ego depletion and, furthermore, improved their ability to self-regulate. There is no claim that positive mood can provide a general benefit to people who had not previously engaged in self-regulatory tasks; rather, positive mood can restore depleted individuals' capacity to self-regulate. Furthermore, this experimental work does not consider in depth the mechanisms by which performance is restored. It is not known whether positive mood counteracts ego depletion or whether positive mood merely motivates an individual to persist in a task, despite one's depleted state.

The ego-depletion effect itself (without mood intervention) has, however, been shown to be unrelated to mood changes, as shown in multiple ego-depletion experiments that either controlled for mood or saw no mood changes.

== Theoretical explanations ==
=== Conservation hypothesis ===
The conservation hypothesis is a partial explanation of ego depletion. It suggests that there are two sorts of depletion:

1. When one is completely depleted and unable to self-control.
2. When one is only partly depleted. Still, one reduces one's self-control efforts to avoid complete exhaustion.

According to this view, when people feel depleted, there might still exist a reserve store of energy to be used in extreme, high-priority situations that could be encountered in the future. This can be adaptive to the extent that expending any more resources at a given time might render an individual fully depleted of one's resources in an unexpected situation requiring self-regulation or other self-monitoring behaviours. The existence of a spare reservoir of mental energy ultimately explains why various motivators can buffer the effects of mild or moderate ego depletion. In a state of low resources, an individual lacks motivation to exert any more energy, but if motivation is presented, there are still extra resources that can be used up. Thus, ego depletion could be conceptualized as a psychological constraint necessary to safeguard precious resources that might be needed in emergency situations in the future. Under mild depletion, people still have a small amount of energy left in their "tank", which they do not have access to under normal circumstances.

== Criticism ==
=== Questions and alternative explanations ===
Although self-control has traditionally been thought of as a limited resource that can be depleted, some researchers disagree with this model. While multiple studies provided support for the ego-depletion effect, there is no direct measure of ego depletion, and studies mainly observe it by measuring how long people persist at a second task after performing a self-control task (the depleting task). Furthermore, researchers usually examine the average task performance rather than the longitudinal performance trajectory. Only a few studies are available where performance trajectories were modelled. In two studies there was no evidence that the ego-depletion group performed worse in the first trials of the second task.

Many ego-depletion studies, however, have shown that mood is not relevant to the results. In fact, many of the earlier experiments have tested for the effects of mood and saw no effect of mood whatsoever. Furthermore, the study and measurement of ego depletion may be affected by the confounding effect of cognitive dissonance. Researchers have questioned whether subjects are truly experiencing ego depletion, or whether the individuals are merely experiencing cognitive dissonance in the psychological tasks.

==== Process model ====
Michael Inzlicht and Brandon J. Schmeichel proposed an alternative account of depletion that they termed the process model. This process model holds that initial exertions of willpower lead an individual's motivation to shift away from control, and towards gratification. As a part of this process, one's attention shifts away from cues that signal the need for control, and towards cues that signal indulgence. Inzlicht and Schmeichel argue that the process model provides a starting point for understanding self-control and that more research examining these cognitive, motivational, and affective influences on self-control is needed. A 2020 pre-registered study (686 participants) by Inzlicht and colleagues provided some evidence for this model. They fitted computational models of decision making to show that when depleted, the decision boundary parameter was reduced, suggesting that people disengage and become less interested in exerting further effort. Furthermore, they showed that depletion did not impair inhibitory control.

== Reproducibility controversy and conflicting meta analyses ==
Although up until the mid-2010s there was widespread confidence in the robustness of the ego depletion effect, a substantial body of research has since cast doubt on the replicability of the effect.

A 2010 meta analysis of 198 independent tests found the effect significant with a moderate effect size (d = .6). Even after accounting for possible unpublished failed studies, the analysis concluded that it is extremely unlikely that the effect doesn't exist. In 2015, a meta analysis of over 100 studies by Carter and McCullough argued that the 2010 meta-analysis failed to take publication bias into account. They showed statistical evidence for publication bias. When they statistically controlled for publication bias, the effect size estimate was small (d = .2) and not significantly different from zero. Michael Inzlicht and colleagues praised Carter's meta analysis, but argued that bias-correction techniques are not precise enough to give a precise control size estimate. In response, Cunningham and Baumeister argued that Carter and McCullough analysis contained errors in its data collection and in the various analyses used.

Ulrich Schimmack (2016) conducted a meta-analysis of published studies and found that most studies could produce significant results only with the help of random sampling error. Based on the low power of studies, one would expect a large number of non-significant results, but these results are missing from published articles. This finding supports Carter and McCullough's meta-analysis that showed publication bias with a different statistical method. Schimmack's replicability report also identified a small set of studies with adequate power that provided evidence for ego-depletion. These studies are the most promising studies for a replication project to examine whether ego-depletion effects can be replicated consistently across several independent laboratories.

In 2016, a major multi-lab replication study (2141 participants) carried out at two dozen labs across the world using a single protocol failed to find any evidence for ego depletion. In response, Baumeister and Vohs argued that Baumeister's original protocol was rejected by the project coordinators, and after discussion was stalled, he only reluctantly agreed to a task that differed to some degree from the original 1998 studies. However, a subsequent, separate multi-lab replication project, led by Kathleen Vohs and involving 36 labs testing 3531 participants, also failed to find an ego-depletion effect (d = 0.06; an order of magnitude smaller than the effect size estimate in the original Hagger meta-analysis). Replication difficulties have also emerged for 5 additional protocols (operationalizations) of the basic ego depletion effect.

== See also ==
- Akrasia
- Decision fatigue
- Dopamine fasting
- Emotional self-regulation
- Free will
- Replication crisis
- Self-control
- Self-monitoring
- Self-observation
- Spoon theory
- Adenosine
