= Willpower: Rediscovering the Greatest Human Strength =

2011 book by Roy Baumeister

- First edition
- Author: Roy Baumeister; John Tierney
- Illustrator: Enrique Perez
- Language: English
- Subject: Self-control
- Publication date: 2011
- Publication place: United States
- Pages: 304
- ISBN: 978-1-59420-307-7

Willpower: Rediscovering the Greatest Human Strength is a book about self-control, co-authored by Roy Baumeister, professor of psychology at Florida State University, and New York Times journalist John Tierney. The book outlines Baumeister's research on ego depletion, surveys why people do not have effective self-control and outlines techniques for improving one's self-control.
