= John Leo =

American writer and journalist (1935–2022)

John Leoth
- Born: June 16, 1935; Hoboken, New Jersey, U.S.
- Died: May 9, 2022 (aged 86); The Bronx, New York City, U.S.
- Education: University of Toronto
- Occupation: Journalist
- Spouse(s): Stephanie Wolf (divorced) Jacqueline Leo (m. 1978)
- Children: 3

John Patrick Leo (June 16, 1935 – May 9, 2022) was an American writer and journalist. He was noted for authoring columns in the National Catholic Reporter and U.S. News & World Report, as well as for his reporting with The New York Times and Time magazine. He later became editor-in-chief of "Minding the Campus", a web site focusing on America's colleges and universities. After retiring from journalism, he joined the Manhattan Institute as a senior fellow in 2007.

== Early life ==
Leo was born in Hoboken, New Jersey, on June 16, 1935. His father, Maurice, was a designer of kitchen and hospital equipment; his mother, Mary (Trincellita), was a housewife. Leo was raised in Teaneck, New Jersey, and attended Regis High School in New York City on scholarship, graduating in 1952. He then studied philosophy and English at the University of Toronto, where he was also the editor of the student newspaper. After his graduation in 1957, he went back to his home state and covered the criminal courts for the Bergen Record of Hackensack, New Jersey, for three years. He subsequently worked as the editor of the Catholic Messenger, published by the Roman Catholic Diocese of Davenport of Davenport, Iowa, in 1960.

== Career ==
Leo became an associate editor of Commonweal in New York, an independent Catholic magazine, in 1963. In his weekly column for the National Catholic Reporter, titled "Thinking It Over", he pushed hard for free speech and greater openness in the church. In this campaign, he attracted many critics and was disinvited as a speaker several times and banned in the diocese of Allentown. When Daniel Berrigan, a flamboyant anti-Vietnam-war Jesuit, was exiled to Latin America and put under a vow of silence, Leo broke the story in his column. Berrigan was soon brought back home.

The New York Times hired Leo in 1967 as its first reporter to cover the intellectual world. After leaving the Times, he was named an assistant administrator in New York City's Environmental Protection Administration. He returned to journalism and inaugurated the Press Clips column in The Village Voice and served as book editor of the sociological magazine Society. Leo worked at Time from 1974 to 1987, writing the behavior section which covered psychology, psychiatry, feminism and intellectual trends. He also wrote essays and humor, including the Ralph-and-Wanda dialogues between a liberal feminist and her curmudgeonly husband.

From 1988 to 2006, Leo's weekly column for U.S. News & World Report was syndicated to 140 newspapers by Universal Press Syndicate. The column focused mainly on social and cultural issues, most commonly political correctness, but also advertising, movies, language, the news media, higher education, pop psychology and the self-esteem movement. His 1995 column on Time-Warner, terming it America's "leading cultural polluter", sparked the campaign that led to Time-Warner's decision to sell off its 50 percent share in Interscope Records, a heavy producer of gangsta rap.

External videos
- Booknotes interview with Leo on Two Steps Ahead of the Thought Police, August 28, 1994, C-SPAN
- Presentation by Leo on Incorrect Thoughts, March 19, 2001

Leo served on the board of advisers of the Columbia Journalism Review for a decade and on the church-state committee of the American Civil Liberties Union for two years. He taught journalism at St. Ambrose University in Davenport and non-fiction writing at Southampton College on Long Island. He was a visiting scholar at Ralston College during his later years. Leo wrote that researchers should not worry about the effects of their findings, noting, "You're just supposed to tell your peers what you found. I don't expect academics to fret about these matters", regarding a study showing that diversity decreases the social capital of a community.

Leo's book of humor, How the Russians Invented Baseball and Other Essays of Enlightenment (ISBN 978-0-385-29758-5), was published in 1989. His other books are Two Steps Ahead of the Thought Police (ISBN 978-0-7658-0400-6, 1994) and Incorrect Thoughts (ISBN 978-0-7658-0038-1, 2001).

== Personal life ==
Leo's first marriage was to Stephanie Wolf. Together, they had two children, Kristin and Karen. They eventually divorced. He subsequently married Jacqueline Leo in 1978. She was the former editor-in-chief of The Fiscal Times, Reader's Digest, and other publications, and they remained married until his death. They had one child together named Alex.

Leo died on May 9, 2022, at a hospital in The Bronx at the age of 86. He had Parkinson's disease and was hospitalized for COVID-19 prior to his death.
