= Roy Baumeister =

American social psychologist (born 1953)

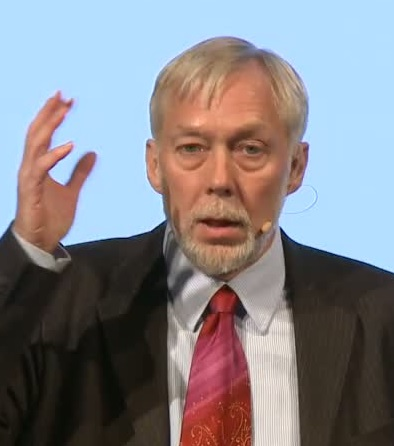
- Baumeister at the 2011 ZURICH.MINDS
- Born: Roy Frederick Baumeister; May 16, 1953 (age 73); Cleveland, Ohio, U.S.
- Education: Princeton University (AB, PhD); Duke University (MA)
- Known for: Willpower: Rediscovering the Greatest Human Strength, Self studies.
- Awards: 1993–94 James McKeen Cattell Fund Sabbatical Fellowship Award, 2003 ISI highly cited researcher, 2004 Mensa Award for Excellence in Research, 2007 SPSP Distinguished Service Award, 2011 Jack Block Award, 2012 Distinguished Lifetime Career Contribution Award, 2013 William James Fellow Award
- Scientific career
- Fields: Social psychology, Evolutionary psychology
- Workplaces: University of Queensland; Florida State University; Case Western Reserve University (1979–2003)

Roy Frederick Baumeister (/ˈbaʊmaɪstər/; born May 16, 1953) is an American social psychologist who is known for his work on the self, social rejection, belongingness, sexuality and sex differences, self-control, self-esteem, self-defeating behaviors, motivation, aggression, consciousness, and free will.

== Education and academia ==
Baumeister earned his A.B. from Princeton University and his M.A. from Duke University. He returned to Princeton University with his mentor Edward E. Jones and earned his Ph.D. from the university's Department of Psychology in 1978.

Baumeister then taught at Case Western Reserve University from 1979 to 2003, serving as a professor of psychology and later liberal arts. He later worked at Florida State University as the Francis Eppes Eminent Scholar and head of the social psychology graduate program. At FSU, Baumeister worked in the psychology department, teaching classes and graduate seminars on social and evolutionary psychology. In 2016 he moved to the School of Psychology at the University of Queensland in Australia where he taught for several years.

He is a fellow of both the Society for Personality and Social Psychology and the Association for Psychological Science. Baumeister was named an ISI highly cited researcher in 2003 and 2014.

== Topics of research ==
Baumeister's research focuses on six themes: self control, decision-making, the need to belong and interpersonal rejection, human sexuality, irrational and self-destructive behavior, and free will. He is the most cited author of a series of psychology journals focusing on personality such as Psychological Bulletin, Journal of Personality, Personality and Social Psychology Review (T&F), Psychological Science in the Public Interest.

=== The self ===
Baumeister has conducted research on the self, focusing on various concepts related to how people perceive, act, and relate to their selves. Baumeister wrote a chapter titled, "The Self" in The Handbook of Social Psychology, and reviewed the research on self-esteem, concluding that the perceived importance of self-esteem is overrated.

=== Irrationality and self-defeating behavior ===
In a series of journal articles and books, Baumeister inquired about the reasons for self-defeating behavior. His conclusions: there is no self-defeating urge (as some have thought). Rather, self-defeating behavior is either a result of trade-offs (enjoying drugs now at the expense of the future), backfiring strategies (eating a snack to reduce stress only to feel more stressed), or a psychological strategy to escape the self – where various self-defeating strategies are rather directed to relieve the burden of selfhood.

=== The Need to Belong ===
Baumeister wrote a paper on the need-to-belong theory with Mark Leary in 1995. This theory seeks to show that humans have a natural need to belong with others. Baumeister and Leary suggest that human beings naturally push to form relationships. This push helps to distinguish a need (rather than a desire). In addition to the drive for attachment, people also struggle to avoid the disintegration of these relationships. As part of this theory, a lack of belonging would have a long-term, negative impact on mood and health, and those who do not meet their belonging needs may suffer from behavioral and psychological issues. Need-to-belong theory has two necessary parts:

1. There is frequent contact between the people involved in the attachment that is typically conflict-free.
2. The notion of an ongoing and continued relationship between them is essential.

This work was groundbreaking in that it separated itself from previous theories relating to attachment such as those of John Bowlby. While Bowlby's theory implied the attachment needs to be applied to a group leader or authority figure, Baumeister and Leary's need-to-belong theory posited that the relationship could be with anyone. To further distinguish the two theories, Baumeister and Leary theorized that if a relationship dissolved, the bond can often be replaced with a bond to another person.

Later, Baumeister published evidence that the way people look for belongingness differs between men and women. Women generally prefer a few close and intimate relationships, whereas men generally prefer shallower connections with a greater number of people or to belong to a cause rather than close interpersonal relations.

=== Self-regulation ===
Baumeister also researched self-regulation. He coined the term "ego depletion" to describe the evidence that humans' ability to self-regulate is limited, and after using it there is less ability (or energy) to self-regulate. Ego depletion has a general effect, such that exerting self-control in one area will use up energy for further regulation in other areas of life. Further research by Baumeister and colleagues has led to the development of the Strength Model of self-control, which likens this ego depletion to the tiredness that comes from physically exerting a muscle. A corollary to this analogy, supported by his research, is that self-control can be strengthened over time, much like a muscle. The energy used up is more than metaphorical, however; his research has found a strong link between ego depletion and depletion of blood-glucose levels. Baumeister also edited two academic books on self-regulation, Losing Control and Handbook of Self-Regulation, and has devoted numerous experiments and journal papers to the topic. He also describes this research in a book, Willpower, authored with former New York Times journalist John Tierney.

In 2016, a large study carried out at two dozen labs in countries across the world that sought to reproduce the effects described in these studies was unsuccessful. Baumeister, however, disputed the protocol used in this replication. Baumeister also plans to run his own pre-registered replication using a protocol that is more in line with most ego-depletion experiments.

=== Culture and human sexuality ===
A series of studies of human sexuality has addressed questions such as how nature and culture influence people's sex drive, rape and sexual coercion, the cultural suppression of female sexuality, and how couples negotiate their sexual patterns. In his research, Baumeister reached four major conclusions:

1. The relative influence of culture and nature on sexuality varies by gender. Female sexuality is more cultural/nurture, and male sexuality is more in-born/nature (see erotic plasticity).
2. There is a gender difference with sex drive. Men, on average, want more sex than women.
3. The present widespread cultural suppression of female sexuality exists in large part at the behest of women.
4. Sexual interactions can be analyzed in terms of cost-benefit analysis and market dynamics with "sexual economics."

=== Free will ===
Baumeister approaches the topic of free will from the view-point of evolutionary psychology. He has listed the major aspects that make up free will as self-control, rational, intelligent choice, planful behavior, and autonomous initiative. Baumeister proposes that "the defining thrust of human psychological evolution was selection in favor of cultural capability" and that these four psychological capabilities evolved to help humans function in the context of culture. In his view, free will is an advanced form of action control that allows humans to act in pro-social ways towards their enlightened self-interest when acting in these ways would otherwise be in conflict with the fulfillment of evolutionarily older drives or instincts. However, free will is contradictory to the idea of self-interest. Research by Baumeister and colleagues (principally Kathleen Vohs) has shown that disbelief in free will can lead people to act in ways that are harmful to themselves and society, such as cheating on a test, increased aggression, decreased helpfulness, lower achievement levels in the workplace, and possible barriers to beating addiction. However, although initial studies suggested that believing in free will is associated with more morally praiseworthy behavior, some recent studies have reported contradictory findings.

=== Erotic plasticity ===
Baumeister coined the term "erotic plasticity", which is the extent to which one's sex drive can be shaped by cultural, social and situational factors. He argues that women have high plasticity, meaning that their sex drive can more easily change in response to external pressures. On the other hand, men have low plasticity, and therefore have sex drives that are relatively inflexible.

== Works ==
=== Books authored ===
- Identity: Cultural Change and the Struggle for Self (1986).
- Masochism and the Self (1989).
- Meanings of Life (1991).
- Escaping the Self: Alcoholism, Spirituality, Masochism, and Other Flights from the Burden of Selfhood (1991).
- Your Own Worst Enemy: Understanding the Paradox of Self-Defeating Behavior (1993).
- Breaking Hearts: The Two Sides of Unrequited Love (1994).
- Losing Control: How and Why People Fail at Self-Regulation (1994).
- Evil: Inside Human Violence and Cruelty (1997).
- With Dianne Tice, The Social Dimension of Sex (2000).
- With Tina S. Miracle and, Andrew W. Miracle, Human Sexuality: Meeting Your Basic Needs (2002).
- The Cultural Animal: Human Nature, Meaning, and Social Life (2005).
- With Brad J. Bushman, Social Psychology and Human Nature (2008).
- Is There Anything Good About Men?: How Cultures Flourish by Exploiting Men (2010).
- Willpower: Rediscovering the Greatest Human Strength (2011).
- Homo Prospectus (2016).
- The Power of Bad, co-written with John Tierney, (2019).
  Martin Seligman called it "The most important book at the borderland of psychology and politics that I have ever read."
- The Self Explained. Why and How We Become Who We Are, (2021)

=== Books edited ===
- Public Self and Private Self (1986).
- Self-Esteem: The Puzzle of Low Self-Regard (1993).
- The Self in Social Psychology (1999).
- Social Psychology and Human Sexuality (2001).
- With George Loewenstein and Daniel Read, Time and Decision: Economic and Psychological Perspectives on Intertemporal Choice (2003).
- With Kathleen D. Vohs, Handbook of Self-Regulation: Research, Theory, and Applications (2004).
- With Kathleen D. Vohs, Encyclopedia of Social Psychology (2007).
- With Kathleen D. Vohs and George Loewenstein, Do Emotions Help or Hurt Decision Making?: A Hedgefoxian Perspective (2007).
- With John Baer and James C. Kaufman, Are We Free? Psychology and Free Will (2008).
- With Joseph P. Forgas and Dianne M. Tice, Psychology of Self-Regulation: Cognitive, Affective, and Motivational Processes (2009).
- With Alfred Mele and Kathleen Vohs, Free Will and Consciousness: How Might They Work? (2010).
- With Eli J. Finkel, Advanced Social Psychology: The State of the Science (2010).
- With Kathleen D. Vohs, New Directions in Social Psychology (2012).
- With Joseph P. Forgas, The Social Psychology of Living Well (2018)

== Personal ==
Baumeister is married to Dianne Tice, a social psychologist with whom he has collaborated.

== See also ==
- Decision fatigue
- Ego depletion
- Negativity bias
