= First Lady Bake-Off =

American baking competition (1992–2016)

The First Lady Bake-Off, also called the Presidential Cookie Bake-Off or Presidential Cookie Poll, was a baking competition between the spouses of leading United States presidential candidates. It was held by American women's magazine Family Circle from its founding in 1992 until the final competition in 2016. Family Circle proposed the competition in 1992 after Hillary Clinton made a political gaffe about baking that was interpreted by some as disparaging housewives.

During the competition, Family Circle published cookie recipes from the spouses of presidential candidates, who stood to become First Lady or First Gentleman of the United States. The public voted to decide the winning recipe. The competition became known for frequently mirroring the results of presidential elections. It resulted Hillary Clinton's victories over Barbara Bush in 1992 and Elizabeth Dole in 1996, Laura Bush's victories over Tipper Gore in 2000 and Teresa Kerry in 2004, Cindy McCain's victory over Michelle Obama in 2008, Obama's victory over Ann Romney in 2012, and Bill Clinton's victory over Melania Trump in 2016.

The competition was popular but received some criticism for allegedly reinforcing sexist gender roles. It was canceled after Family Circle went out of business in 2019.

== Background ==
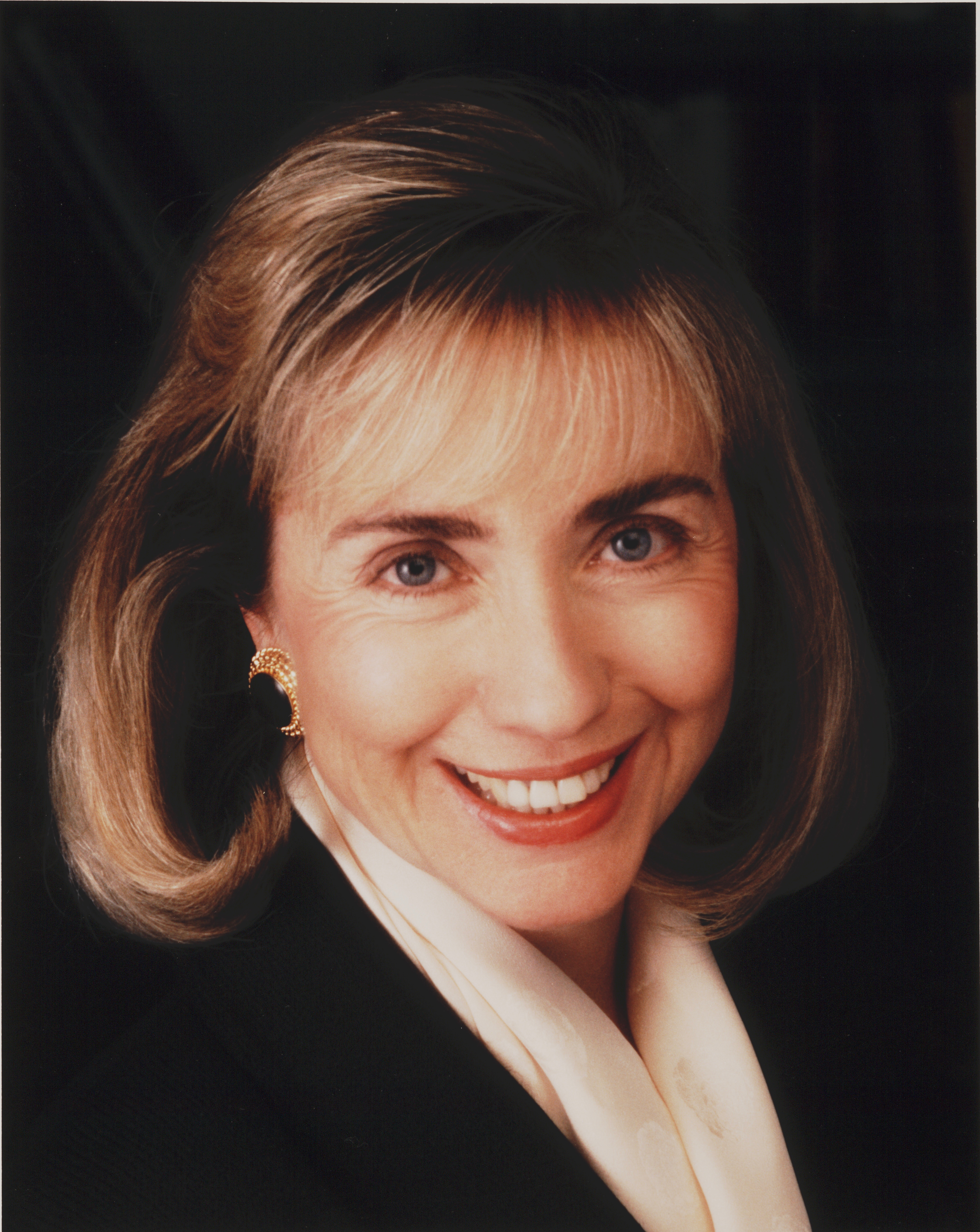
Hillary Clinton in 1992, the year of the first bake-off.

The competition was inspired by a political gaffe made by Hillary Clinton in 1992 during her husband Bill Clinton's presidential campaign. In response to questions about her career and the Whitewater controversy, she stated that "I suppose I could have stayed home and baked cookies and had teas, but what I decided to do was to fulfill my profession, which I entered before my husband was in public life". These remarks were controversial and were perceived by some as a slight on housewives. Time received numerous letters from women who were offended by Clinton's comments.

Hillary Clinton's role in her husband's presidential campaign differed from that of Barbara Bush, wife of Republican candidate George H. W. Bush. While Bush played a more traditional role as First Lady, Clinton emphasized the fact that she would play a major role in policy and political decision-making in her husband's administration if he were elected. Clinton's remarks surrounding her career and attitude towards traditional gender roles were the subject of sustained controversy. At the time, publications like The New York Times and Los Angeles Times suggested that the public debate over Clinton's remarks stemmed from anxiety over the impact of feminism in American society.

Seeking to capitalize on the controversy, the magazine Family Circle came up with the idea of a cooking contest between the wives of presidential candidates. The competition gave them the opportunity to publish cookie recipes in the magazine, so that its subscribers could try them at home and vote for their favorites.

== History ==
=== 1992 competition ===
Clinton and Bush both took part in the competition, but Margot Perot, wife of independent candidate Ross Perot, declined to participate. In response, Family Circle's editor-in-chief Jacqueline Leo commented that "My feeling was that [Margot Perot] orders in". Clinton reportedly took the competition seriously and enlisted friends to help her with baking, as a way to recover from the gaffe and make herself appear more traditional. Clinton had thousands of cookies baked by friends and professional bakeries for distribution at campaign events and in Madison Square Garden.

The winning recipes were announced in October, ahead of the presidential election. Clinton won the competition against her opponent Barbara Bush. In 1993, Consumer Reports ranked Clinton's recipe as being equal to Nestle Tollhouse's recipe and superior to Mrs. Fields' and Duncan Hines' recipes. Bush later wrote that her own recipe had been borrowed from a housemate.

According to media science professor Tammy R. Vigil, media coverage of the bake-off portrayed the women participating as adhering to traditional gender roles, publishing anecdotes about their domestic lives that contributed to this image. This coverage focused on stories about Clinton and Bush developing recipes and baking with their families, and accounts of other people testing the recipes at home.

=== 1996 competition ===
Clinton competed against Elizabeth Dole, the wife of presidential candidate Bob Dole, during 1996 US presidential election. During the competition, some publications noted that Clinton's chocolate chip cookie recipe had several advantages over Dole's pecan roll cookie recipe, including a shorter preparation time and healthier ingredients. Clinton ultimately won the competition.

=== 2000 competition ===
During the 2000 US presidential election, Laura Bush, wife of George W. Bush, competed in the bake-off Tipper Gore, wife of Al Gore. Bush submitted a recipe for cowboy cookies, while Gore submitted a recipe for ginger snaps. Bush won the competition.

=== 2004 competition ===
During the 2004 US Presidential election, the bake-off was held between Laura Bush and Teresa Heinz, wife of John Kerry. Bush's cowboy cookies beat Kerry's pumpkin spice cookies. Kerry told NPR and The New York Times that she disapproved of the pumpkin spice recipe and suspected one of her staff of purposely sabotaging her by submitting an unappealing recipe. She further stated that she did not like pumpkin cookies and had never made them before. Kerry's office claimed that they had originally submitted a recipe called "Yummy Wonders" which was rejected by Family Circle, and one of her staffers submitted pumpkin spice cookies as a replacement without consulting her. Kerry's press secretary, Marla Romash, corroborated her statements, saying that "If you tasted those [pumpkin] cookies, you'd think someone was trying to do you harm, too."

=== 2008 competition ===
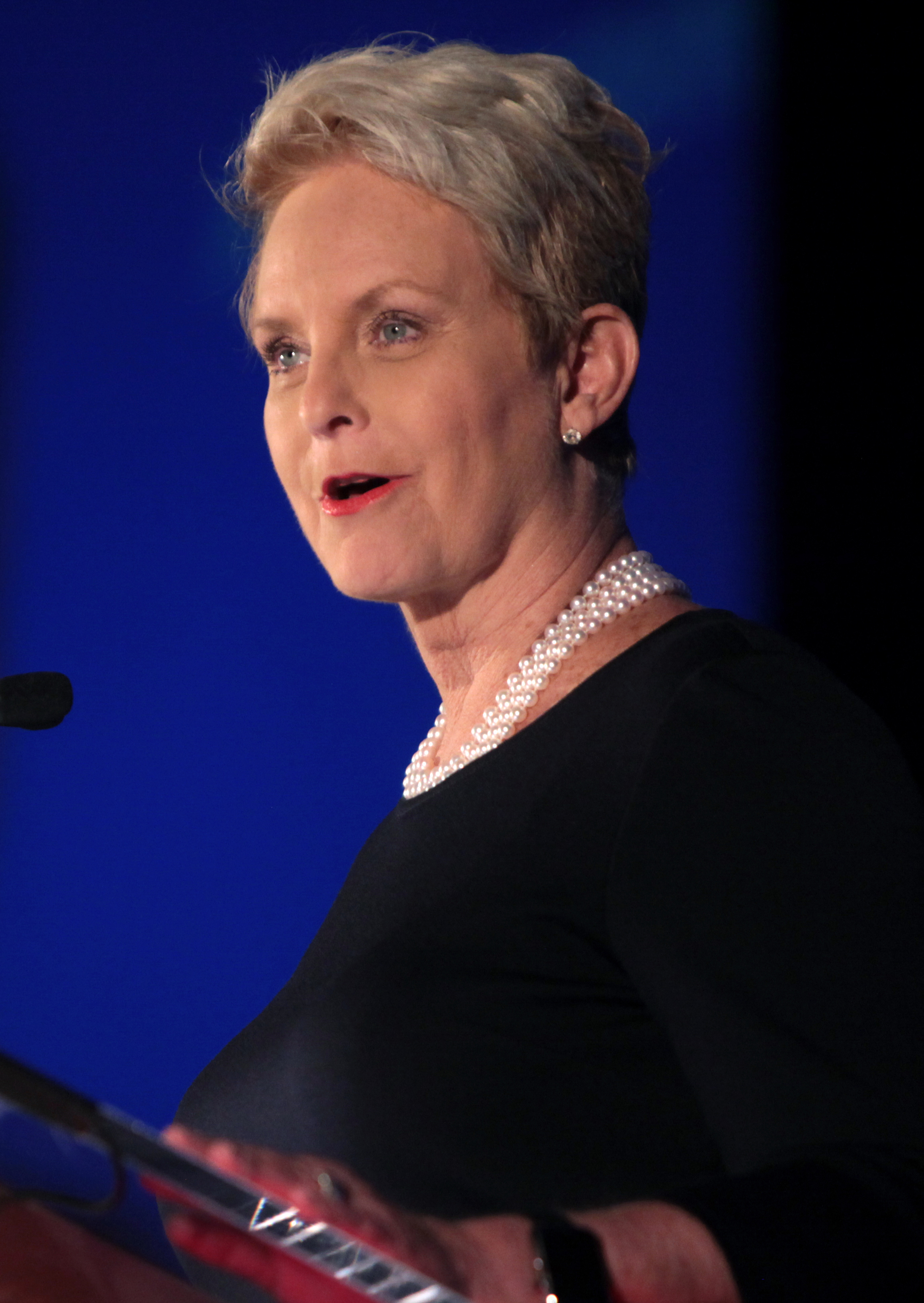
Cindy McCain in 2015

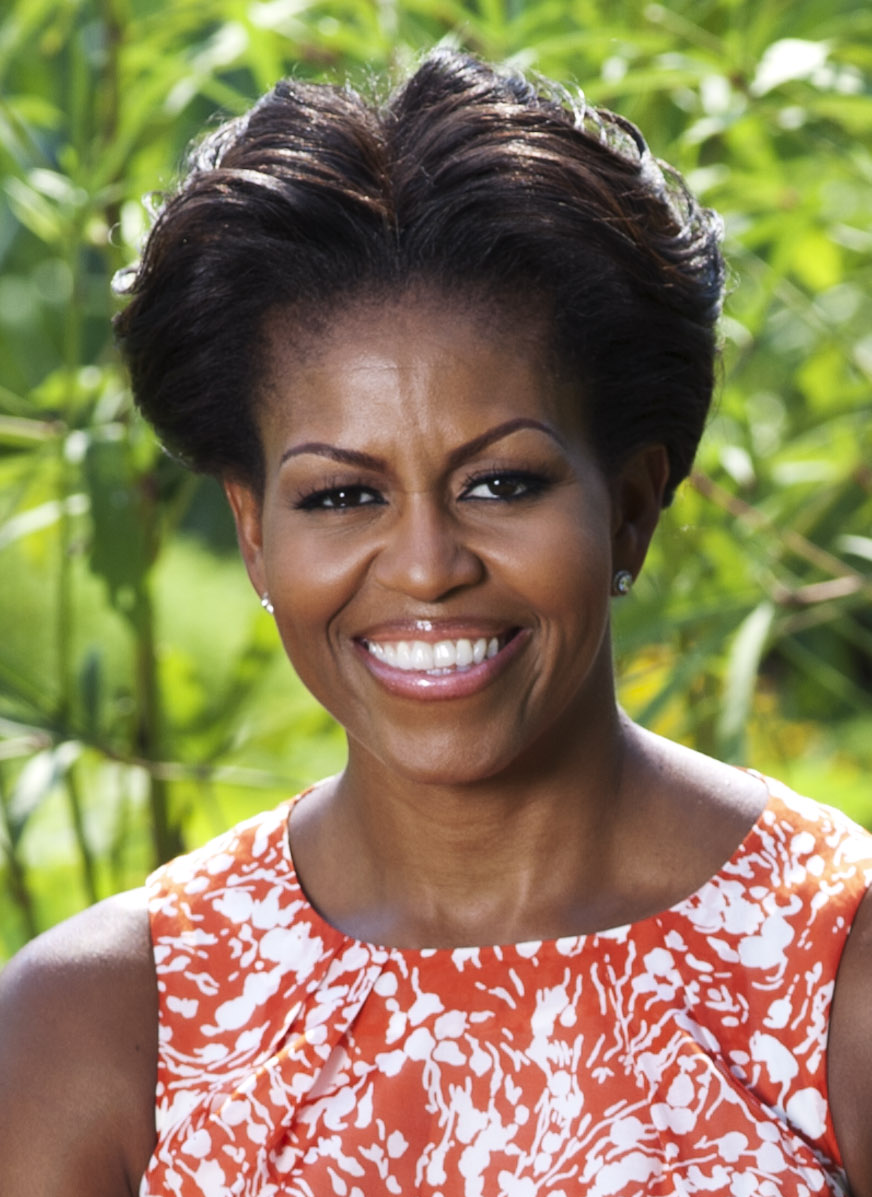
Michelle Obama in 2011

McCain's victory over Obama in 2008 was the first time that the bakeoff's results differed from the presidential election

During the 2008 US presidential election, Cindy McCain, wife of Senator John McCain, competed in the bake-off against Michelle Obama, wife of Barack Obama. McCain's Oatmeal-Butterscotch cookies beat Obama's shortbread cookies. However, McCain was accused of plagiarizing her recipe from a packaging for Hershey's. This marked the first time in the contest's history that the results differed from the presidential election, as John McCain lost to Barack Obama.

=== 2012 competition ===
The 2012 bake-off was named the Presidential Cookie Bake-Off. During the 2012 US presidential election, Michelle Obama competed in the bake-off against Ann Romney, wife of presidential candidate Mitt Romney. Obama's white and dark chocolate chip cookies beat the M&M cookies submitted by Romney. Obama's recipe contained white chocolate, dark chocolate, mint chocolate, and walnuts, and was described by Obama as a "splurge" dessert. USA Today observed that the recipe included significant amounts of chocolate, butter, and Crisco, which it described as being a departure from her overall focus on healthy eating.

=== 2016 competition ===
In 2016, the competition was renamed the Presidential Cookie Poll. Hillary Clinton was the Democratic presidential nominee against Donald Trump in the 2016 US presidential election, which placed her husband Bill in the running for First Gentleman. Bill Clinton competed against Trump's wife, Melania Trump, in the bake-off. Family Circle reportedly had difficulty organizing the competition and receiving recipes from the candidates in 2016, and considered cancelling it.

Trump submitted a star-shaped sugar cookie recipe that was noted to have Eastern European influences like the inclusion of sour cream. These influences were attributed to the fact that her country of birth is Slovenia. Clinton submitted the same chocolate chip cookie recipe as Hillary had in previous years, under the name "The Clinton Family's Chocolate Chip Cookies". His decision to repeat his wife's recipe was criticized by The Atlantic, although he won the competition.

=== 2020 cancelation ===
The bake-off was canceled in 2020, after Family Circle went out of business in 2019, meaning that Jill Biden and Melania Trump did not compete against each other during the 2020 US presidential election.

== Results ==
Various publications identified key ingredients whose inclusion made it more likely that a cookie would win the competition, such as chocolate and oatmeal.

Election year	Winner	Other contestants	Matched electoral results	Refs.
2016 election	Bill Clinton – chocolate chip cookies	Melania Trump – star sugar cookies	No	
2012 election	Michelle Obama – white and dark chocolate chip cookies	Ann Romney – M&M cookies	Yes	
2008 election	Cindy McCain – oatmeal-butterscotch cookies	Michelle Obama – shortbread cookies	No	
2004 election	Laura Bush – cowboy cookies	Teresa Kerry – pumpkin spice cookies	Yes	
2000 election	Laura Bush - cowboy cookies	Tipper Gore - ginger snap cookies	Yes	
1996 election	Hillary Clinton – chocolate chip cookies	Elizabeth Dole – pecan roll cookies	Yes	
1992 election	Hillary Clinton – chocolate chip cookies	Barbara Bush – chocolate chip cookies	Yes	

== Reception ==
The competition was a popular event during United States presidential elections. Historian Carl Sferrazza Anthony suggested that the competition began as a humorous event and gradually became a serious campaign tool.

It was criticized by some commentators for being "demeaning" and promoting sexist stereotypes about women's roles. Journalist Faith Salie of CBS called it "retrograde tradition that began either with sexism or irony". Erin Gloria Ryan, writing for Jezebel during the 2012 election, questioned whether the competition would still be held once a female candidate won a presidential primary, suggesting that it might be seen as "offensive" for a prospective First Gentleman to take on a traditionally feminine role like baking. Political commentator Jonathan Chait of Intelligencer wrote that "There may be candidates whose wives do not bake cookies from scratch, or even candidates who do the cookie-baking themselves rather than delegate the task to the little woman. But they could never admit as much because it would now be held as a slap against millions of American women."

Debbie Walsh, director of the Center for American Women and Politics at Rutgers University, said that Clinton's remarks "stepped outside the bounds of what was seen as the traditional role of first lady, potential first lady [...] the price she paid was being placed in the midst of a cookie bake-off." In a retrospective article about the competition's end, Kelly Faircloth of Jezebel attributed the backlash towards Clinton's comments and the success of the contest to contemporary anxieties about the increasing number of career women. In a 2020 article, Kate Bennett of CNN suggested that Clinton's remarks in 1992 had "a ripple-effect across the country, pitting stay-at-home spouses against those who work."

Journalist Anna Quindlen considered the competition to exemplify the pressure for First Ladies of the United States to fit outdated gender expectations that had become less fashionable in broader society. Quindlen wrote that, "It's particularly noticeable that Hillary Clinton, who has already changed her name, her hair, her clothes, and her comments, is reduced to hawking her chocolate-chip-cookie entry in the First Lady bake-off."

=== Comparison to electoral results ===
The competition became known for often predicting the results of the presidential election, with its results matching the outcome of five out of seven elections. The streak was first broken in 2008, when McCain's cookies beat Obama's.

== See also ==
- Cookie poll
