= Jonathan Levav =

- Born: January 20, 1975 (age 51); Jerusalem, Israel
- Education: Princeton University
- Scientific career
- Fields: Behavioral Economics
- Workplaces: Stanford University, Columbia University

Jonathan Levav (born January 20, 1975) is a professor of marketing at the Stanford Graduate School of Business (GSB). He is a scholar in behavioral economics and consumer decision-making, with research focusing on how cognitive biases, emotions, and social influences shape individual and collective choices.

== Early life and education ==
Jonathan Levav was born in Jerusalem, Israel, to Dr. Itzhak Levav and Dr. Miriam Levav. He received his bachelor's degree in public and international affairs from Princeton University, where he developed an interest in the intersection of psychology, economics, and decision-making, inspired by the teaching of Daniel Kahneman. He earned a PhD in marketing from the Fuqua School of Business at Duke University, focusing his dissertation on preference prediction.

== Academic career ==
Levav is currently the King Philanthropies Professor of Marketing at Stanford University's Graduate School of Business, where he also serves as the director of the behavioral lab. He researches behavioral decision theory, studying how psychological and contextual factors influence consumer choices.

Levav's research has made contributions to the fields of behavioral economics, marketing, and psychology. His work is notable for its empirical focus, as he often conducts experiments to understand the mechanisms driving decision-making. His findings have been influential in both academic circles and practical business applications, helping companies better anticipate and understand consumer behavior. He won the Hillel J. Einhorn Young Investigator Award.

Levav has examined phenomena such as the decision fatigue, decoy effect, framing effects, and the role of emotion in shaping consumer preferences. His research has provided insights into how subtle contextual changes significantly alter consumer choices.

== Selected publications ==
- Evangelidis, Ioannis; Bhatia, Sudeep; Levav, Jonathan; Simonson, Itamar (2024-06-03), "50 Years of Context Effects: Merging the Behavioral and Quantitative Perspectives", Journal of Consumer Research, vol. 51, no. 1, pp. 19–28
- Brucks, Melanie S.; Levav, Jonathan (2024-04-27), "Virtual Communication Curbs Creative Idea Generation", Nature, vol. 605, pp. 108–112
- Danziger, Shai; Levav, Jonathan; Avnaim-Pesso, Liora (2011-04-26), "Extraneous factors in judicial decisions", Proceedings of the National Academy of Sciences, 108 (17): 6889–6892, Bibcode:2011PNAS..108.6889D, doi:10.1073/pnas.1018033108, PMC 3084045, PMID 21482790

== See also ==
- Behavioral economics
