= John Tierney (journalist) =

American journalist (born 1953)

- Born: John Marion Tierney; March 25, 1953 (age 73); Chicago, Illinois, U.S.
- Education: Yale University (BA)
- Occupation: Journalist
- Employer: City Journal
- Spouses: Dana Tierney (divorced) Helen Fisher (m. 2020; died 2024)
- Children: 1
- Website: johntierneynyc.com

John Marion Tierney (born March 25, 1953) is an American journalist and a contributing editor to City Journal, the Manhattan Institute's quarterly publication. Previously he had been a reporter and columnist at the New York Times for three decades since 1990. A self-described contrarian, Tierney is a critic of aspects of environmentalism, the "science establishment," and big government, but he does support the goal of limiting overall emissions of carbon dioxide.

== Early and personal life ==
Tierney was born on March 25, 1953, outside Chicago, and grew up in "the Midwest, South America and Pittsburgh". He graduated from Yale University in 1976. He was previously married to Dana Tierney, with whom he had one child. They later divorced; Tierney married anthropologist and love expert Helen Fisher in 2020.

== Career ==
After graduating from college, Tierney was a newspaper reporter for four years, first at the Bergen Record in New Jersey and then at the Washington Star. Starting in 1980, he spent ten years in magazine journalism writing for such magazines as Atlantic Monthly, Discover, Esquire, Health, National Geographic Traveler, New York, Newsweek, Outside, Rolling Stone. Tierney began working at The New York Times in 1990 as a "general assignment" reporter in the Metro section. Tierney writes a science column, "Findings", for the Times. He previously wrote the TierneyLab blog for the Times. In 2005, Tierney began to write for the Times Op-Ed page and as of 2015 his writings appeared in both the Times Op-Ed and "Findings" science column. He also writes for the City Journal.

In 2009, Tierney wrote about mathematics popularizer Martin Gardner and in that same year started featuring recreational mathematics problems, often curated by Pradeep Mutalik in his New York Times TierneyLab blog. In 2010, Tierney retired from writing the blog, and Mutalik continued it under a new name (NumberPlay). In time, Gary Antonick took that over until he retired it in October 2016.

== Views ==
Tierney described his TierneyLab blog as being "guided by two founding principles":

- Just because an idea appeals to a lot of people doesn't mean it's wrong.
- But that's a good working theory.

The About section of the TierneyLab blog started with, "John Tierney always wanted to be a scientist but went into journalism because its peer-review process was a great deal easier to sneak through". Tierney identifies himself as a libertarian and has become increasingly identified with libertarianism.

His column about New York, "The Big City", ran in the New York Times Magazine and the Metro section from 1994 to 2002. His criticism of rent stabilization, the war on drugs, Amtrak and compulsory recycling, have been described as questioning "some of the complacent shibboleths of urban liberalism". In 1996, his column "Recycling Is Garbage" broke the New York Times Magazine's hate mail record, and was praised by libertarians for bringing "libertarian ideas to America's big-government bible". Critics complained that, in the article, he quoted "not a single representative of the recycling industry", but did cite the head of "an environmental consulting business for hire to solid waste companies". In a similar contrarian vein, in 2001 Tierney cited a study suggesting that global warming would boost the U.S. economy.

Joseph J. Romm has written that Tierney is one of the "influential but misinformed skeptics" who have helped prevent the United States from taking action on climate change. In his 2007 book Hell and High Water, Romm refutes Tierney's misinformation. Columbia Journalism Review complains Tierney "has a tendency to support his point of view using sources with a clear ideological or special interest agenda, without properly identifying them".

In 2007, Tierney wrote a column arguing that Silent Spring, Rachel Carson's highly influential 1962 book about the detrimental effects of pesticides on the environment, is a "hodgepodge of science and junk science" whose rhetoric still "drowns out real science", such as the work of agricultural bacteriologist Ira Baldwin. Among those who have accused him of errors of fact and misrepresentation are Erik M. Conway and Naomi Oreskes in their 2010 book Merchants of Doubt, as well as journalist Merrill Goozner.

In 2016, Tierney accused President Barack Obama of "politicized science to advance his agenda", and appointees in the Obama administration of "junk science—or no science—to justify misbegotten crusades against dietary salt, trans fats, and electronic cigarettes. According to Tierney, they cited phony statistics to spread myths about a gender pay gap and a rape crisis on college campuses".

== Awards ==
- 1998–99, New York News Publishers Association: Distinguished Column Writing Award.
- 1988, American Association for the Advancement of Science/Westinghouse Science Journalism Award, for a cover story in Newsweek, "The Search for Adam and Eve."
- 1983, American Institute of Physics–United States Steel Foundation Science Writing Award.

== Books ==
- God Is My Broker, A comic novel written in parody of financial and spiritual self-help book was written in collaboration with novelist Christopher Buckley.
- Willpower: Rediscovering the Greatest Human Strength. Co-wrote in 2011, along with Florida State University psychologist Roy F. Baumeister. They state that self-control and willpower function analogously to muscles. Thus, they write that willpower can be exhausted from overuse but generally speaking is strengthened through exercise (exercise that modern people tend to disregard). Publishers Weekly praised the book as "a very fine work" that is "clear and succinct" as well as "based on solid research".
- The Best-Case Scenario Handbook: A Parody Sep 16, 2002. a parody of the popular Worst-Case Scenario Handbook series.
- The Power of Bad: How the Negativity Effect Rules Us and How We Can Rule It. Co-written with Baumeister and published in 2019.

== See also ==
- Simmons–Tierney bet
- Scientific consensus on climate change
- Public opinion on climate change
