= Mark Thoma =

American economist

- Born: December 15, 1956 (age 69)

Academic background
- Education: California State University, Chico (BA); Washington State University (PhD)

Academic work
- Discipline: Macroeconomics, econometrics
- Institutions: University of Oregon
- Website: Information at IDEAS / RePEc

Mark Allen Thoma (born December 15, 1956) is a macroeconomist and econometrician and a professor of economics at the Department of Economics of the University of Oregon. Thoma is best known as a regular columnist for The Fiscal Times through his blog "Economist's View", which Paul Krugman called "the best place by far to keep up with the latest in economic discourse", and as an analyst at CBS MoneyWatch. He is also a regular contributor to EconoMonitor.

== Career and research ==
Thoma obtained his B.A. from California State University, Chico in 1980, and his Ph.D. from Washington State University in 1985. After having been visiting professor at the Department of Economics of the University of California, San Diego in 1986–87, he joined the faculty of the Department of Economics of the University of Oregon in 1987, where he was head of the department from 1995 to 2000 and became full professor in 2010.

Thoma's research focuses on how money impacts the economy. Some of Thoma's earliest work deals with real economic activity as related to a number of variables. In a 1994 paper, he studies the asymmetry between the supply of money in an economy and the distribution of income. He argues that the relationship between the supply of money and income is weakest when real economic activity is at a high, but correlates closely as economic activity declines. In another paper, he concludes that financial variables such as interest rates are not useful as a predictive measure of future economic activity.

Thoma's more controversial work has dealt with the business cycle under different conditions in partisan politics. He first broached the topic in 1991 with an article called Partisan Effects in Economies with Variable Electoral Terms. He contends that in parliamentary governments—which call elections at their leisure—conservative parties are more likely to experience recessions near the end of their terms, while liberal administrations would be likely to experience periods of increasing growth. In a later article, Thoma expands on already existing academic literature which suggests surprise regime changes occur on a regular schedule, forming the basis of a political business cycle. He applies this logic to open economies in order to find that not only is there empirical support for the idea of a political business cycle, but there may yet be more implications for domestic indicators on a partisan basis.
