= Jerry on the Job =

American comic strip by Walter Hoban

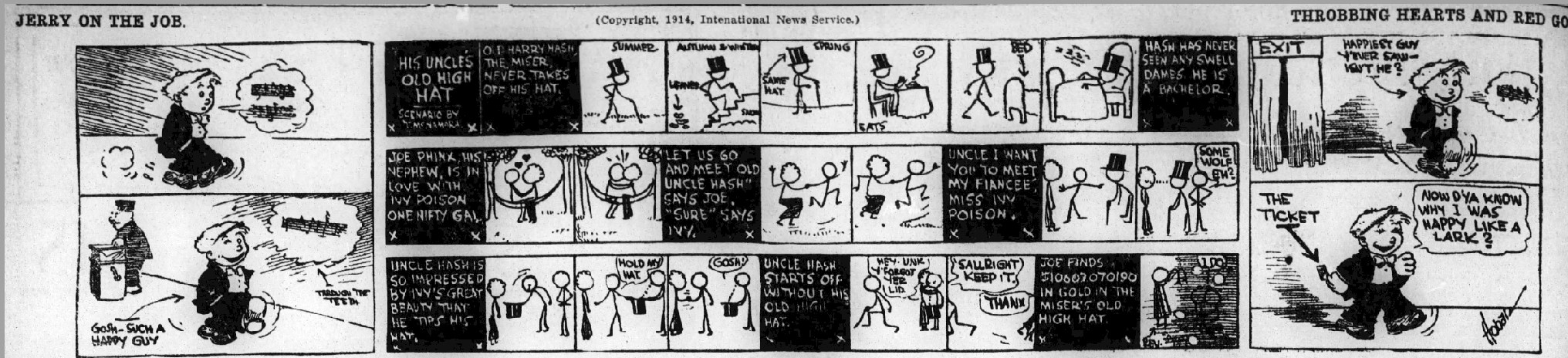
- November 25, 1914, strip.
- Author: Walter Hoban
- Current status/schedule: Concluded daily & Sunday strip
- Launch date: December 29, 1913
- End date: 1931
- Syndicate(s): International Feature Service
- Genre: Humor

Jerry on the Job is a comic strip created by cartoonist Walter Hoban, set for much of its run in a railroad station. Syndicated by William Randolph Hearst's International Feature Service, it originally ran from 1913 to 1931. The strip had a brief revival by Bob Naylor from 1946 to 1949.

== Origins ==
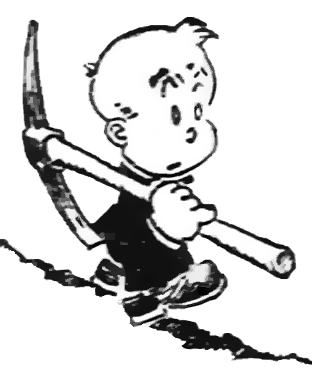
Jerry with pickaxe (1919)

When Hoban was given only a weekend to devise a comic strip, he created Jerry on the Job, about pint-size Jerry Flannigan, initially employed as an office boy and then in a variety of other jobs. The strip was launched on December 29, 1913. Comics historian Don Markstein described Hoban's character and work situations:

Jerry was about the size of a five-year-old who was small for his age, and proportioned like an infant (larger head as compared with the rest of his body) only more so—Jerry was only two heads tall; i.e., the remainder of him, all put together, was about as big as his head... After a year or two, he began moving from job to job. He was a retail clerk, a messenger boy, even a prize fighter (at his size!) and other things before Hoban went off to fight World War I, and the strip went on hiatus. When it returned, Jerry was working at a railroad station under the supervision of Mr. Givney, the station's manager. His job included just about everything that went into making a railroad station function—selling tickets, sweeping floors, toting baggage, running little errands for the boss, etc. Sources of humor included the eccentrics who hung around the station, Mr. Givney's peevishness, and Jerry's own ineptitude. Also, Hoban pioneered in the use of humorous signs posted here and there in the background, a motif also seen in Smokey Stover, Mad and elsewhere. Many commentators on the strip have praised Hoban for putting his characters through spectacular "takes", that is, exaggerated physical responses to surprising or disconcerting events. He specialized in what some call the "flip take", which left the character undergoing it (usually Givney) as flat on the ground as Charlie Brown after trying to kick Lucy's football.

== Sunday strip ==
The Jerry on the Job Sunday page began in 1919, but on October 19, 1930 it became a topper strip above another Hoban feature, Rainbow Duffy. The daily strip came to an end in 1931, as did Rainbow Duffy and the Sunday strip.

Hoban died in 1939, but his former assistant, Bob Naylor, revived Jerry on the Job as a syndicated strip for King Features, starting on Oct. 21, 1946. However, Naylor's revival was not as successful as Hoban's original strip, and the strip was canceled in 1949.

== Animation ==
From 1916 to 1920, Jerry on the Job was adapted by International Film Service and Bray Studios into a series of animated films, including The Mad Locomotive, Cheating the Piper, A Thrilling Drill, Swinging His Vacation and Without Coal. The animator was Walter Lantz, who recalled, "I animated one 250- foot Jerry on the Job every two weeks".

== Cultural legacy ==
Hoban's work was a strong influence on cartoonist Merrill Blosser and his comic strip Freckles and His Friends, which ran from 1915 to 1971.

During the late 1930s, Hoban's character was used to advertise Post Grape-Nut Flakes. The ads ran on newspaper comic pages and in Woman's Day.

== See also ==
- Cheating the Piper - one of the animated films based on the strip
