= Cookie poll =

Predicting the U.S. presidential election based on cookie sales

A cookie poll is the practice in the United States of predicting a presidential election based on cookie sales.

In a cookie poll, bakeries offer confections decorated with either the candidate's name or image, or the color of the candidate's party. Customers purchase the cookie for the candidate they support and tallies are used to forecast a winner. In the name of fairness and accuracy, cookie polls are only considered legitimate if cookies representing both candidates are sold; bakeries will stop the polling once a supply of any one candidate's cookies are depleted beyond a certain point.

This poll is unscientific and not controlled for any factor beyond consumer habits, but many bakeries across the U.S. claim success at predicting elections for the last several voting cycles, including one bakery in Ohio that accurately foresaw the last nine elections. Other bakeries use it as a platform to encourage voter participation.

== See also ==
- First Lady Bake-Off
