= Jacqueline Leo =

American magazine editor and media producer

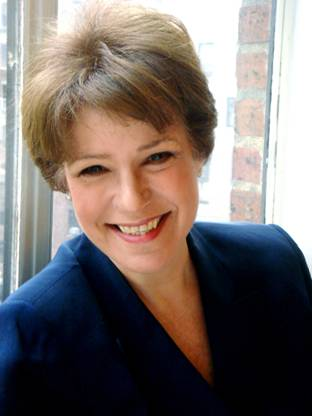
Jacqueline Leo

Jacqueline McCord Leo is an American magazine editor and media producer. She is the former editor-in-chief of the Reader's Digest. Her prior roles included editorial director of Consumer Reports. She was the founder of Child magazine, which was acquired by The New York Times Company, and became editor-in-chief of Family Circle.

== Education ==
Leo graduated from Baruch College of the City University of New York in 1968.

== Career ==
Jacqueline Leo is founder and former Editor-in-Chief of The Fiscal Times, a news website she launched in February 2010.

Leo worked as the fashion editor for Modern Bride magazine, and in this role shared advice for people preparing for a wedding, advice that she published in a 1982 book.

Leo founded and launched Child magazine in 1986. A year later, The New York Times Magazine Group acquired the magazine and appointed her editor-in-chief of Family Circle. While she was editor-in-chief, Family Circle ran an article on toxic waste dumping written by Stephanie Abarbanel that won the 1990 National Magazine Award for Public Interest.

She later became editorial director of The New York Times Women's Magazine Group.

In 1999 she was named head of interactive services for Meredith Publishing Group.

She was senior producer and editorial director for ABC News' Good Morning America; and she served as editorial director for Consumer Reports magazine and their varied media products.

From 2001 through November 2007, Leo was vice president and Editor-in-Chief of Reader's Digest. She was responsible for converting the magazine from reprints to digital content, and led the magazine in a move towards computer assisted reporting.

== Selected publications ==
- Leo, Jacqueline McCord (1982). The new woman's guide to getting married. Bantam Books. ISBN 9780553013757.
- Leo, Jacqueline McCord (2009). Seven : the number for happiness, love and success. New York: Twelve. ISBN 978-0-446-54269-2. OCLC 317383474.

== Awards and honors ==
Leo is a former president of the American Society of Magazine Editors. In 1993 Leo received a Matrix Award from New York Women in Communications.

== Personal life ==
Jacqueline Leo was married to columnist and author John Leo.
