= Child (magazine) =

American parenting magazine

- Final issue of Child, June/July 2007
- Editor-in-Chief: Miriam Arond
- Categories: Parenting
- Frequency: 10X a year
- Circulation: 740,534
- Publisher: Meredith Corporation
- Founded: 1986
- First issue: October 1986
- Final issue: June/July 2007
- Country: USA
- Language: English
- ISSN: 0894-7988

Child was an American parenting magazine founded by Jackie Leo and MaryAnn Sommers in 1986 and published until 2007.

== History and profile ==
Child was first published in October 1986. The magazine was started as a bi-monthly publication. It was originally backed by Italian publishers, then sold to the New York Times Magazine Group in 1987. The company published it until 1995 along with its other women's magazines, including Family Circle, before selling the titles to Gruner + Jahr. The Meredith Corporation acquired nearly all of the US-based products of Gruner + Jahr in 2005, except for some youth publications.

In February 2000, Miriam Arond became editor in chief and relaunched Child as a childrearing lifestyle magazine.

Child sponsored events including its annual Children's Champion Awards (those honored at the awards events included Dr. Marion Wright Edelman, Judy Blume, Geoffrey Canada, Wendy Kopp), children's fashion shows for Fashion Week in New York City, and the Best Children's Book Awards, whose Lifetime Achievement Award-winners included Julie Andrews, Maurice Sendak, Hilary Knight, Tomie de Paola and Eric Carle.

When Meredith Corporation acquired Child magazine in 2005, it lowered the magazine's rate base from 1,020,000 to 700,000+. In 2007, Meredith discontinued the print version and folded the website Child.com into Parents.com, which includes content from its other mass market, parent-related magazines American Baby, Parents and Family Circle.
