= The Fiscal Times =

- Website type: News and opinion
- Available in: English
- Founded: 2010
- Headquarters: 529 14th St, N.W. Washington, D.C., and 712 5th Ave; New York, NY, {{{location_country}}}
- Owners: The Fiscal Times Media Group, LLC
- Founder: Peter G. Peterson
- Key people: Jacqueline Leo (Editor-in-chief); Eric Pianin (Washington editor); Yuval Rosenberg (Executive editor)
- Website: thefiscaltimes.com
- Advertising: Native
- Registration: Optional, but is required to comment
- Launched: 2010
- Current status: Online

The Fiscal Times (TFT) is an English-language digital news, news analysis and opinion publication based in New York City and Washington, D.C. It was founded in 2010 with initial funding from businessman and investment banker Peter G. Peterson. Jacqueline Leo serves as the publication's editor-in-chief.

Through three core content channels—policy and politics, business and economy, and life and money—the publication focuses on how fiscal policy affects business and consumers and how business and consumer behavior influences government fiscal policy. The site's news coverage also tracks the Presidency, Congress and the Federal Reserve.

== Overview ==
The publication bills itself as "The Source for All Things Fiscal." It adds that it is "part of a new era of independently supported non-partisan journalism" on fiscal policy, which "works to present fair, accurate and balanced reporting and serve as an honest broker in sorting through a broad range of viewpoints, including the federal budget, the growing deficit, entitlements, health care, personal savings, taxation, and the global economy."

The Fiscal Times' advisory committee periodically meets with TFT editors to assess performance and progress in meeting its goals and standards. The committee includes Robert D. Reischauer, president emeritus of the Urban Institute; Drew Altman, CEO of the Henry J. Kaiser Family Foundation; Jim Brady, former executive editor of The Washington Post; Jodi T. Allen, senior editor of the Pew Research Center; and G. William Hoagland, senior vice president at the Bipartisan Policy Center.

== History ==
Businessman Peter G. Peterson a controversial Wall Street billionaire who uses his wealth to underwrite numerous organizations and PR campaigns to generate public support for slashing Social Security, Medicare, and Medicaid, founded The Fiscal Times by providing the initial funding for the publication in 2009 and 2010. Jackie Leo, former editor-in-chief of Reader's Digest was selected to be the publication's editor-in-chief. Other journalists involved in the launch of the publication included former Washington Post budget reporter Eric Pianin, who became the publication's Washington editor, Ann Reilly Dowd from Fortune magazine, and Merrill Goozner, former chief financial writer for the Chicago Tribune. The publication was to launch in early 2010, but began content partnership programs with organizations including The Washington Post in 2009.

Some liberal advocacy groups accused Peterson of having a political agenda for funding the start-up organization. On 31 December 2009, the Washington Post published a news article, "Support grows for tackling nation's debt," created by The Fiscal Times as part of a content partnership agreement with the Post. The liberal media watchdog group Fairness and Accuracy in Reporting (FAIR) issued an "Action Alert" in reaction to the story, saying that the Post had taken "special-interest 'propaganda' and passed it off as a news story." Washington Post ombudsman Andrew Alexander, responded to what he described as an "uproar" from critics, criticized his paper's "glaring lack of transparency" on the partnership and wrote that the piece "was not sufficiently balanced," but nonetheless defended The Fiscal Times partnership, writing that Peterson had told him that his funding of The Fiscal Times had "no strings attached." FAIR also criticized the Post for publishing another Fiscal Times article that FAIR criticized as a "soft profile" of two members of the White House deficit reduction commission. FAIR questioned whether the piece entertained "serious criticism of the ideas being advanced so far by the commission (cutting Social Security, most notably)." The New York Times noted that several other start-up media publications including Politico and ProPublica, which also supplied material to newspapers, also had prominent backers who donated to political causes.

Celebrating the February 2010 launch of the website for The Fiscal Times, an article in "The Washington Scene" section of The Hill stated that it had received "rave reviews, with guests and journalists commending the site on its non-partisan, clearly numbers-based approach to reporting the news of money." Economist Dean Baker of the progressive think tank the Center for Economic and Policy Research wrote in April 2010 that the publication's news articles displayed pro-deficit-reduction bias.

== Staff ==
The Fiscal Times staff consists of several veteran reporters, including editor-in-chief Jackie Leo (former editor-in-chief for Reader's Digest); Washington editor Eric Pianin (former editor and budget reporter for the Washington Post); Yuval Rosenberg (former editor at Fortune); Maureen Mackey (former editor at Reader's Digest); Rob Garver (former editor at ProPublica); Mark Thoma (professor of economics at the University of Oregon); Patrick Smith (former Hong Kong (and then Tokyo) bureau chief for the International Herald Tribune); and columnist Ed Morrissey (blogger at the conservative Hot Air blog).

== Partnerships ==
TFT has partnerships with a number of news organizations, including the Washington Post, which allows both publications to jointly produce as well as share content, CNBC, Microsoft, Bloomberg Terminal, Business Insider, MSN Money and Bankrate. In addition, TFT stories appear frequently on the Huffington Post and The Week.
