= Woman's Day =

American magazine

- Cover of the December 2024/January 2025 issue
- Content director: Meaghan Murphy
- Categories: Home economics
- Frequency: Bimonthly
- Publisher: Hearst Magazines
- Total circulation: 682,100 (2024)
- Founded: 1931; 95 years ago
- Country: United States
- Based in: New York City
- Language: English
- Website: womansday.com
- ISSN: 0043-7336

Woman's Day is an American women's magazine that covers such topics as homemaking, food, nutrition, physical fitness, physical attractiveness, and fashion. The print edition is one of the Seven Sisters magazines. The magazine was first published in 1931 by The Great Atlantic & Pacific Tea Company; the publisher is Hearst Corporation.

== History ==
A&P began publishing the U.S. edition as a free in-store menu/recipe planner, calculated to make customers buy more by giving them meal ideas in an easy-to-read format available inside A&P grocery stores. After the 1936 opening of A&P's first modern supermarket (in Braddock, Pennsylvania), A&P expanded Woman's Day in 1937 through a wholly owned subsidiary, the Stores Publishing Company. Selling for five cents a copy (112¢ today), the magazine featured articles on childcare, crafts, food preparation and cooking, home decoration, needlework and health, plus a revival of cartoonist Walter Hoban's Jerry on the Job comic strip in a 1939 Grape-Nuts ad campaign.

Sold exclusively in A&P stores, Woman's Day had a circulation of 3,000,000 by 1944. This had reached 4,000,000 by the time A&P sold the magazine to Fawcett Publications in 1958. By 1965, Woman's Day had climbed to a circulation of 6,500,000. In a mid-1960s appeal to Madison Avenue, an ad for Woman's Day showed a friendly pharmacist named I.A. Morse next to copy that claimed:

So Woman's Day doesn't tell a lot of funny stories, and it doesn't run pictures of fashions its readers could never afford. Like I.A. Morse, Woman's Day -- more than any other magazine -- is a trusted advisor in the day in day out work that's a housewife's chosen profession. That's our profession. And we're proud of it. Like Doc Morse Woman's Day talks man to man to women.

Fawcett was sold to CBS in 1977, and CBS, in turn, sold its magazine division to a group led by division head Peter Diamandis, who renamed the group Diamandis Communications. In 1988 Woman's Day, along with the rest of Diamandis, was acquired by Hachette Filipacchi Médias which published the magazine from offices at 1633 Broadway in New York. Hearst Magazines bought the Hachette magazines in the US in 2011. Under Hearst ownership, the magazine switched to bimonthly frequency.

== Editors ==
- Mabel Hill Souvaine (1943–1957)
- Eileen Tighe (1957–1966)
- Geraldine Rhoads (1966–1982)
- Ellen Levine (1982–1991)
- Jane Chesnutt (1991–2010)
- Elizabeth Mayhew (2010-2012)
- Susan Spencer (2012–2020)
- Meaghan Murphy (2020–present)

== Notable staff ==
- Jeanne Voltz

== See also ==
- List of men's magazines
- List of women's magazines
