= Seven Sisters (magazines) =

American magazine group

The Seven Sisters is a group of magazines which traditionally have been aimed at married women who are homemakers with husbands and children rather than single and working women. The name is derived from the Greek myth of the "seven sisters", also known as the Pleiades. Only three of the magazines are still published as physical magazines. The seven magazines are:

- Better Homes and Gardens (1922–)
- Family Circle (1932–2019)
- Good Housekeeping (1885–)
- Ladies' Home Journal (1883–2016)
- McCall's (1873–2002)
- Redbook (1903–2019)
- Woman's Day (1937–)

== History ==
While all seven of the magazines were aimed at women, they all had divergent beginnings. Family Circle and Woman's Day were both originally conceived as circulars for grocery stores (Piggly Wiggly and A&P); McCall's and Redbook were known for a text-heavy format focusing on quality fiction; Good Housekeeping was aimed at affluent housewives; and Ladies' Home Journal was originally a single-page supplement to a general interest magazine, while Better Homes and Gardens began as a blending of a woman's magazine and a home design journal.

In the 1990s, the Seven Sisters attempted to differentiate themselves by either incremental tweaks to their formula or wholesale changes in the format of the magazine. In recent years, the focus has been on minor changes, such as updating the visual appeal or improving the paper stock on which the magazine is printed.

The Seven Sisters formerly had much larger circulation figures than at present. In 1979, their combined circulation was 45 million; that figure dropped to 37 million a decade later. In 2008, the six surviving sisters had a combined circulation of 26 million. Much of the loss has been attributed to readers seeking out more specialized magazines. Despite the steep drop in readership, five of the sisters were among the top ten paid and verified circulation magazines in the United States in 2008, according to the Magazine Publishers of America (MPA), an industry trade group. Redbook was the only one of the sisters that did not reach the top ten; it was ranked number 29 in the MPA list for 2008.

After a wave of consolidation and mergers, two companies now own the three remaining sisters: Meredith Corporation publishes Better Homes and Gardens and Hearst Corporation publishes Good Housekeeping and Woman's Day. While their circulation has slipped from their figures in the 1960s and 1970s, they are among the highest circulation magazines in the United States.

McCall's ceased publication in 2002 after an attempt to rebrand itself under the name Rosie by teaming up with talk-show host Rosie O'Donnell. Ladies' Home Journal ceased monthly publication in April 2014. Publisher Meredith Corporation stated it would be "transitioning Ladies' Home Journal to a special interest publication". The last issue was made in 2016. Hearst transitioned Redbook to a digital-only property in 2017. Meredith Corporation announced Family Circle ceased publcation in December 2019.

== Controversy ==
A sample of the top twelve selling women's magazines conducted by an intern at the Columbia Journalism Review in 1992 revealed that the Seven Sisters had published substantially fewer articles on the topic of abortion than other popular magazines oriented toward a female readership. Between 1972 and 1991, the Seven Sisters as a group published only 40 articles addressing abortion; the other five magazines had published 97 articles.

In January 2000, a conservative media advocacy group, Morality in Media, criticized a number of women's magazines for what they deemed to be sexually explicit covers; Redbook was among the magazines cited by the group. The editor-in-chief of Redbook told The New York Times, "We are trying to pull away from the rest of the Seven Sisters. We are moving it slightly younger, to fill that gap between the younger fashion magazines and the older, full-fledged Seven Sisters." As a consequence, Wal-Mart began selling copies of Redbook from behind a blinder designed to obscure the text on the cover of the magazine.
