= Family Circle =

American magazine

- October 1, 2009 cover
- Editor-in-chief: Cheryl Brown
- Categories: Home economics; women's interest
- Frequency: 12 per year
- Publisher: Meredith Corporation
- Total circulation: 3,816,958 (2011)
- First issue: 1932; 94 years ago
- Final issue: December 2019; 6 years ago
- Country: United States
- Based in: New York City
- Language: English
- ISSN: 0014-7206

Family Circle was an American women's magazine that covered topics such as homemaking, recipes and health. It was published from 1932 until the end of 2019. Originally distributed at supermarkets, it was one of the "Seven Sisters," a group of seven traditional female-oriented magazines centered on household issues, along with Ladies' Home Journal, McCall's, Good Housekeeping, Better Homes and Gardens, Woman's Day, and Redbook.

== History ==
Family Circle was first published in 1932. It was initially distributed for free at Piggly Wiggly supermarkets until it was offered as a freestanding publication in 1946. Cowles Magazines and Broadcasting bought the magazine in 1962. The New York Times Company bought the magazine for its women's magazine division in 1971. The division was sold to Gruner + Jahr in 1994.

When Gruner + Jahr decided to exit the American magazine market in 2005, the magazine was sold to the Meredith Corporation. From 1973 to 2015, Family Circle was the title sponsor of the Family Circle Cup (Charleston Open) women's professional tennis tournament on the WTA Tour, which was held at its namesake Family Circle Tennis Center in Charleston, South Carolina starting in 2001. At the time the sponsorship ended, Family Circle was the longest-running title sponsor in professional tennis. Between 1992 and 2020, the magazine also ran the First Lady Bake-Off for the spouses of incumbent or running presidential candidates; the results successfully predicted the presidential winner in five of the seven election cycles since its founding.

In November 2009, Family Circle launched a social network called Momster.com for mothers of tweens and teens. In October 2019, Meredith Corporation announced that Family Circle would cease publication with the December 2019 issue. The publisher reported that the magazine had 13 million readers, more than one million followers on social media and a circulation of four million. As part of the closure, about 25 Family Circle staffers were laid off, while others were reassigned at other Meredith publications.

== Editors ==
- Harry Evans (1932–1936)
- Robert Endicott (1936–1954)
- Robert Jones (1955–1965)
- Arthur Hettich (1965–1985)
- Gay Bryant (1985–1986)
- Arthur Hettich (1986–1988)
- Jacqueline Leo (1988–1994)
- Susan Kelliher Ungaro (1994–2005)
- Linda Fears (2005–2017)
- Cheryl Brown (2017–2019)
