= Todd Heatherton =

American psychologist

Todd F. Heatherton is a former professor in the Department of Psychological and Brain Sciences at Dartmouth College who retired following sexual harassment allegations against him. He was an associate editor of the Journal of Cognitive Neuroscience. His recent research uses a social brain science approach, which combines theories and methods of evolutionary psychology, social cognition, and cognitive neuroscience to examine social behavior.

== Research and career ==
Much of Heatherton's work has concentrated on examining the relationship between adolescent smoking and film. His work has helped to shed light on the strong relationship between children witnessing films with smoking characters, and the initiation of adolescent smoking. Along with colleagues, Heatherton has helped to isolate risk factors, including access to movies online and low parental restrictions on film, to an increased likelihood of adolescent smoking. (Note: Dalton, M.A., Sargent, J.D., Beach, M., Titus-Ernstoff, L., Gibson, J.J., Ahrens, M.B., Tickle, J., & Heatherton, T.F. (2003). Effect of viewing smoking in movies on adolescent smoking initiation: A Cohort Study) He has also conducted research concerning the neurological underpinnings of smoking addiction. (Note: Wagner, D.D., Dal Cin, S., Sargent, J.D., Kelley, W.M., & Heatherton, T.F. (2011). Spontaneous action representation in smokers when watching movie characters smoke. Journal of Neuroscience,31, 894-898.)

Heatherton has also conducted a great amount of research concerning the risk factors of bulimia nervosa, using the Eating Disorder Inventory. His work has helped to reaffirm perfectionism, low self-esteem, and a negative perceived weight status as risk factors for bulimia, while asserting that age could be a modifier in onset among at-risk individuals. (Note: Holm-Denoma, J.M., Gordon, K.H., Bardone, A.M., Vohs, K.D., Abramson, L.Y., Heatherton, T.F., & Joiner, T.E. (2005). A test of an interactive model of bulimic symptomatology in adult women. Behavior Therapy, 36, 311-321.) A 20-year longitudinal study has also shown that marriage and children could be a modifier in bulimia in women. (Note: Keel, P. K., Baxter, M. G., Heatherton, T. F., & Joiner, T. E. (2007). A 20-year longitudinal study of body weight, dieting, and eating disorder symptoms. Journal of Abnormal Psychology, 116, 422-432.) His work has also isolated low self-efficacy as a more succinct risk factor for bulimia than the multi-faceted dimension of self-esteem. (Note: Bardone-Cone, A.M., Abramson, L.Y., Vohs, K.D., Heatherton, T.F., & Joiner, T.E., Jr. (2006). Predicting bulimic symptoms: An interactive model of self-efficacy, perfectionism, and perceived weight status. Behaviour Research and Therapy, 44, 27-42.)

He was President of the Society for Personality and Social Psychology in 2011.

Heatherton's recent work has concentrated on the study of social neuroscience.

== Sexual misconduct allegation and retirement ==
In October 2017, Heatherton was placed on paid leave from Dartmouth as the result of a sexual misconduct investigation launched by Dartmouth College. The New Hampshire attorney general, the Grafton county attorney's and sheriff's offices, and the Hanover police opened a criminal investigation in response. New York University revoked his visiting scholar affiliation with their Department of Psychology. Heatherton's attorneys have released a statement saying that he is cooperating with the investigation and that, "he has engaged in no sexual relations with any student." The statement also says that "Dr. Heatherton’s year away from Dartmouth is wholly unrelated to the investigation, as he was awarded a Senior Faculty Grant in October 2016 to facilitate a long-planned sabbatical, and he has utilized it for the 2017-2018 academic year. His sabbatical leave began on July 1, before he learned of the investigation." On June 14, 2018, the president of Dartmouth College announced that the dean of faculty recommended that Heatherton's tenure be revoked and that he be terminated, but he elected to retire immediately. He is banned from entering campus property or attending College events.

The university has not released any specifics of their investigation; however, a tenured professor of psychology at the University of California, Davis alleged that Heatherton groped her at an academic conference in 2002 while she was still a graduate student.
