= Kathleen Vohs =

American psychologist

- Born: Kathleen Diane Vohs
- Education: Gustavus Adolphus College; Dartmouth College
- Awards: Society for Consumer Psychology Distinguished Scientific Contribution Award (2018)
- Scientific career
- Fields: Behavioral economics; Psychology
- Institutions: Carlson School of Management at the University of Minnesota
- Thesis: Self-esteem and threats to self: Implications for self-construals and interpersonal perceptions (2000)
- Doctoral advisor: Todd Heatherton

Kathleen D. Vohs is an American Psychologist. She is Distinguished McKnight University Professor and Land O'Lakes Chair in Marketing in the Carlson School of Management at the University of Minnesota. In 2015, she was named an ISI Highly Cited Researcher, and in 2018, she received the Distinguished Scientific Contribution Award from the Society for Consumer Psychology.
