= Merrill Goozner =

American journalist

Merrill Goozner, is an American journalist, author and educator. He served as editor of Modern Healthcare and ModernHealthcare.com, a weekly news magazine and daily news website covering the healthcare industry, from December 2012 to April 2017. Since then, he writes a weekly column for the magazine as well as writes and edits GoozNews, an online newsletter.

His prior career included five years as a printer with the Cincinnati Post; five years as Cincinnati director of the Ohio Public Interest Campaign (and writer/editor of the Cincinnati AFL-CIO Chronicle); a year as reporter for the Hammond (Ind.) Times; four years with Crain's Chicago Business; 13 years with the Chicago Tribune, including four years as Tokyo bureau chief and Chief Asia Correspondent (1991–95) and two years as Chief Economics Correspondent (1998-2000). He subsequently became a professor of business journalism at New York University (2000-2003) and director of the Integrity in Science Project at the Center for Science in the Public Interest (2004-2009).

== Personal ==
Born in 1950 in New York City, Goozner graduated from the University of Cincinnati in 1975 with a bachelor's degree in history and Columbia University's Graduate School of Journalism in 1982. In 2008, the University of Cincinnati awarded him as Distinguished Alumni Award.

== Appearances ==
Goozner's work has appeared in a number of publications which include, The New York Times, The Washington Post, Columbia Journalism Review, The Nation, The American Prospect and the Washington Monthly.

== Books ==
Goozner is the author of The $800 Million Pill: The Truth Behind the Cost of New Drugs (ISBN 0-520-23945-8) which was published by the University of California Press.
