= Walter Hoban =

American cartoonist

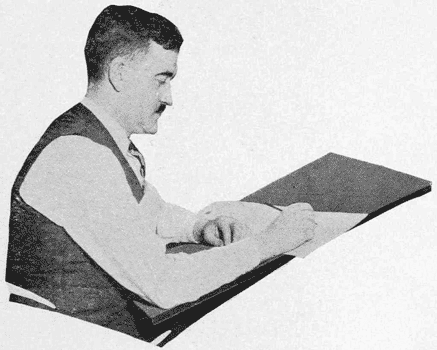

Walter C. Hoban (1890 - November 22, 1939) was an American cartoonist best known for his comic strip Jerry on the Job.

Born in Philadelphia, Hoban came from a newspaper family. His brother Edwin was with The Philadelphia Inquirer, and his father was the city editor and a political and editorial writer with the Philadelphia Public Ledger.

The young Hoban attended parochial schools and Saint Joseph's College, but he dropped out in 1907 to take a job at Philadelphia's North American newspaper, as he recalled, "There I made borders for pictures of the 'murdered man' et al. I drew the borders and the ads so carefully that they made me sporting cartoonist, and I was allowed to see the ball games free. This lasted until late in 1913 when the call of N.Y listened good. Then I joined the Hearst's collection of trained pencil pushers—and have been gaining weight every since."

== Jerry on the Job ==
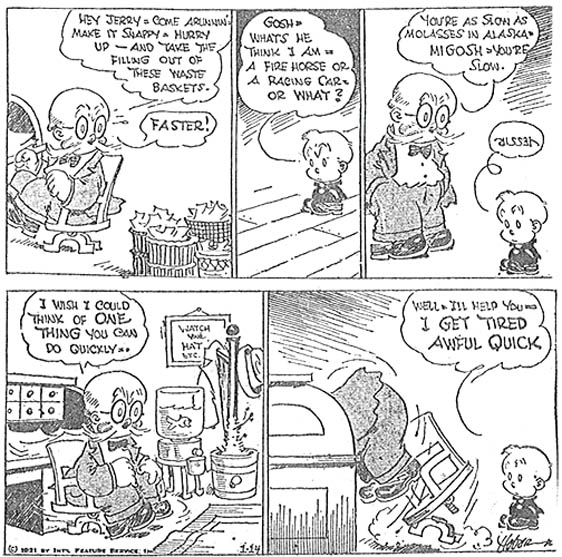
Walter Hoban's Jerry on the Job (1921)

In 1913, invited to New York by Arthur Brisbane, he became a sports cartoonist at the New York Journal. Later that year, he was given only a weekend to devise a comic strip, and he created Jerry on the Job, about pint-size Jerry Flannigan, initially employed as an office boy and then in a variety of other jobs. The strip was launched on December 29, 1913. Comics historian Don Markstein described Hoban's character and work situations:

Jerry was about the size of a five-year-old who was small for his age, and proportioned like an infant (larger head as compared with the rest of his body) only more so—Jerry was only two heads tall; i.e., the remainder of him, all put together, was about as big as his head... After a year or two, he began moving from job to job. He was a retail clerk, a messenger boy, even a prize fighter (at his size!) and other things before Hoban went off to fight World War I, and the strip went on hiatus. When it returned, Jerry was working at a railroad station under the supervision of Mr. Givney, the station's manager. His job included just about everything that went into making a railroad station function—selling tickets, sweeping floors, toting baggage, running little errands for the boss, etc. Sources of humor included the eccentrics who hung around the station, Mr. Givney's peevishness, and Jerry's own ineptitude. Also, Hoban pioneered in the use of humorous signs posted here and there in the background, a motif also seen in Smokey Stover, Mad and elsewhere. And practically everyone commenting on the strip has praised Hoban for putting his characters through spectacular "takes", that is, exaggerated physical responses to surprising or disconcerting events. He specialized in what some call the "flip take", which left the character undergoing it (usually Givney) as flat on the ground as Charlie Brown after trying to kick Lucy's football.

During World War I, Hoban was a sergeant in the military police. In 1918, he attended the divisional training school for officers at Camp Meade in Maryland.

In 1922, Hoban provided illustrative slides to accompany songs in the Greenwich Village Follies revue. He was a member of the Pen and Pencil Club of Philadelphia and took part in their annual Nights in Bohemia roof garden show.

The Jerry on the Job Sunday page began in 1919, but it later became a topper strip above another Hoban feature, Rainbow Duffy. The daily strip came to an end in 1931, and the topper was dropped in 1932. During the late 1930s, Hoban's character was used to advertise Post Grape-Nut Flakes. After Hoban's death in 1939, his former assistant, Bob Naylor, revived Jerry on the Job as a syndicated strip for King Features, starting on Oct. 21, 1946. However, Naylor's revival was not as successful as Hoban's original strip, and the strip was canceled in 1949.

In the 1930s, Hoban started two other strips, Needlenose Noonan and Discontinued Stories, but neither was as successful as Jerry on the Job.

On September 15, 1931, Hoban appeared with 14 other leading newspaper cartoonists on an NBC radio program, Cartoonists Convention, hosted by Arthur "Bugs" Baer. The promotional aspect of this was revealed in radio listings where it was labeled "NBC Hearst Program". The show featured an orchestra, and each cartoonist spoke for 90 seconds. Other cartoonists on the program included Billy DeBeck, Rube Goldberg, Milt Gross and Cliff Sterrett.

Hoban was 49 when he died in 1939. His brother, newspaperman Edwin A. Hoban, died August 23, 1931, at the age of 38.

== Animation ==
Hoban's Jerry on the Job was adapted by Bray Studios into several animated films: "Jerry Ships a Circus" (1916), A Thrilling Drill (1920), Swinging His Vacation (1920), The Mad Locomotive (1922) and Without Coal (1920).
