= August 1971 =

Month of 1971

<<	August 1971					>>
Su	Mo	Tu	We	Th	Fr	Sa
1	2	3	4	5	6	7
8	9	10	11	12	13	14
15	16	17	18	19	20	21
22	23	24	25	26	27	28
29	30	31

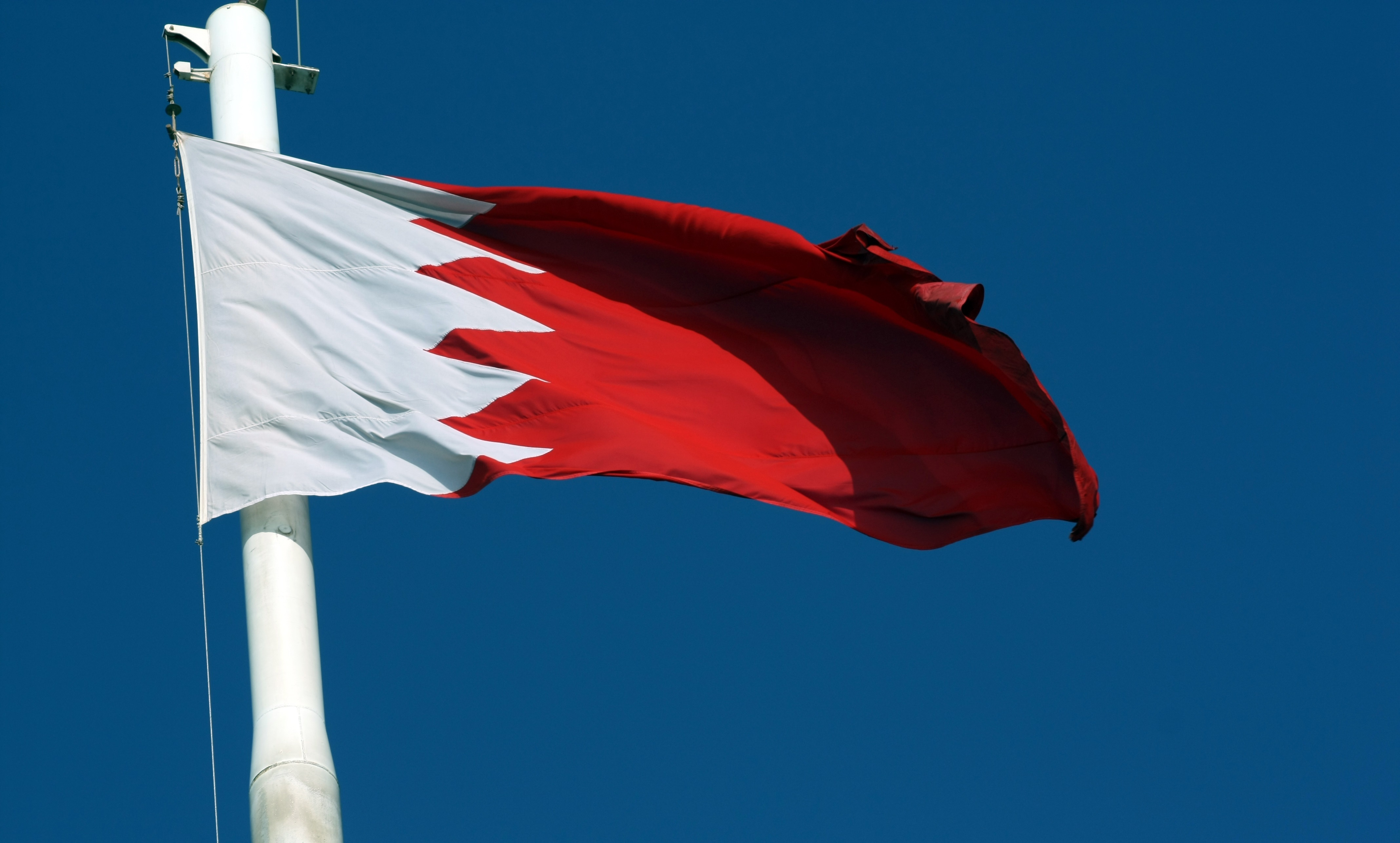
August 15, 1971: Emirate of Bahrain declares independence

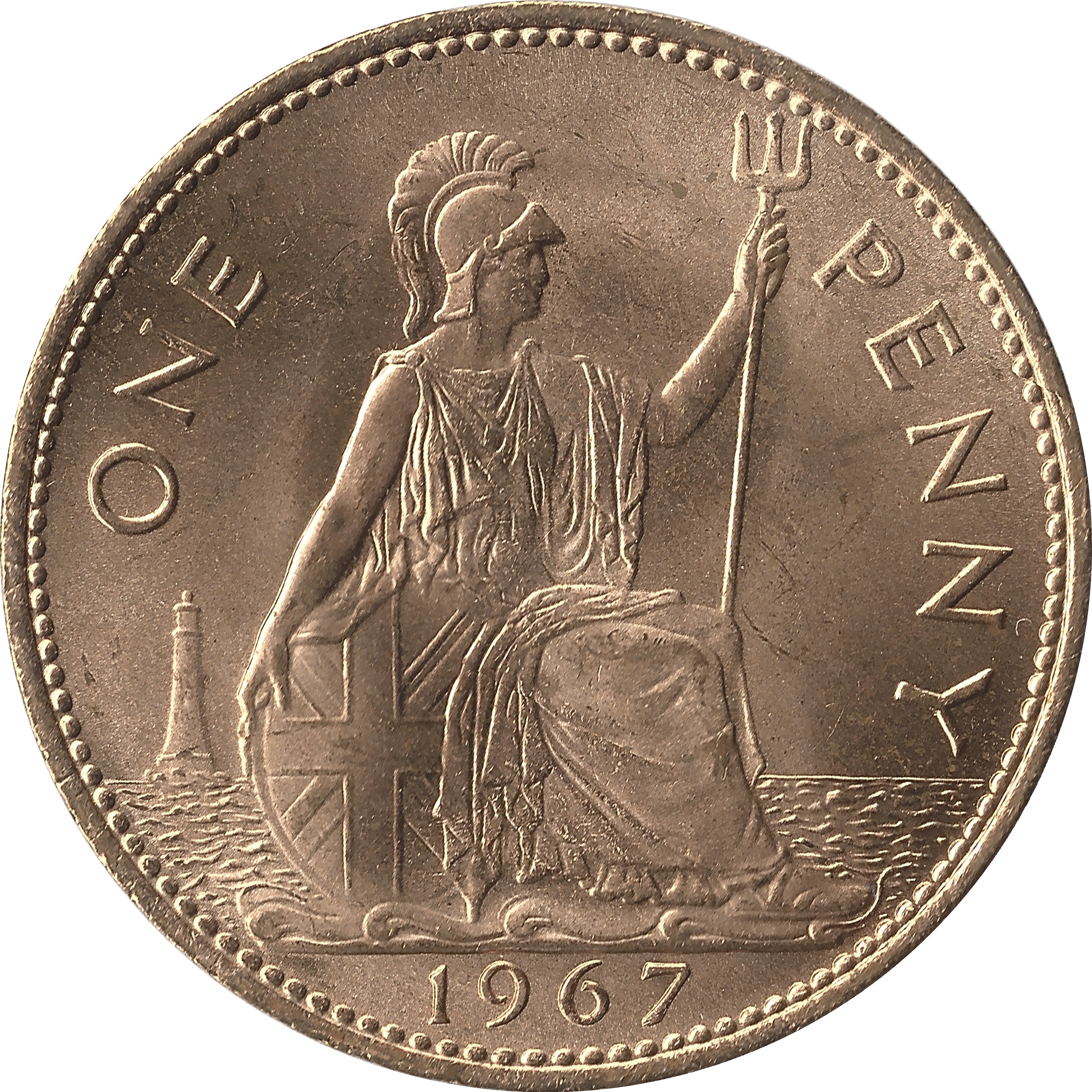
August 31, 1971: The old British penny, worth 1/240th, discontinued as decimalisation begins

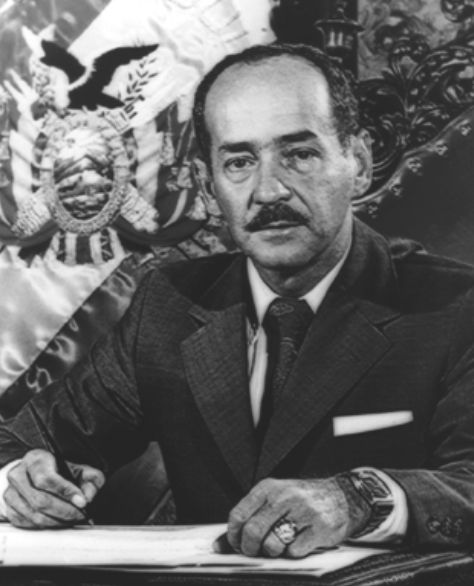
August 22, 1971: Colonel Hugo Banzer leads revolution to overthrow president of Bolivia

August 2, 1971: Apollo 15 astronaut David Scott's replicates Galileo's experiment on the Moon

The following events occurred in August 1971:

== August 1, 1971 (Sunday) ==
- In New York City, 40,000 people attended the Concert for Bangladesh, a pair of fundraising concerts organized by former Beatle George Harrison and Indian sitar player Ravi Shankar in order to raise money for UNICEF to provide humanitarian relief to refugees of Bangladesh. Other musical performers for the concerts at New York's Madison Square Garden were Ringo Starr, Bob Dylan, Eric Clapton, Billy Preston, Leon Russell and the band Badfinger.
- The Sonny & Cher Comedy Hour, starring husband-and-wife singing duo Sonny & Cher, premiered as a summer replacement series on the CBS network, to run for six consecutive summer nights. The variety show was popular enough that it would be added to the CBS regular schedule in December.
- The Fallen Astronaut sculpture and plaque, honoring American astronauts and Soviet cosmonauts who had been killed, was placed on the surface of the Moon by the Apollo 15 astronauts. Mission commander Dave Scott disclosed on August 12, after the return of Apollo 15, that "In a small subtle crater, there is a simple plaque with 14 names — the names of all the astronauts and cosmonauts who have died in the pursuit of exploration of space." He added that the plaque had been left in a small crater 20 feet (6.1 m) north of the Rover lunar car that was left on the Moon.
- The archivists of the yet-to-be-built John F. Kennedy Presidential Library and Museum announced that it was making available almost all of the late President Kennedy's White House files, consisting of 3.3 million pages of documents at the Federal Records Center in Waltham, Massachusetts, and covering the period of Kennedy's presidency from January 20, 1961, to November 22, 1963. The only exception was papers still classified as secret.
- The German Grand Prix at the Nürburgring was won by Jackie Stewart.
- The Nullity of Marriage Act 1971 came into effect in the United Kingdom and provided three different bases for annulment of a marriage that had been approved in a marriage ceremony.

== August 2, 1971 (Monday) ==
- Hours before Apollo 15's lunar module Falcon lifted off from the Moon, U.S. astronaut David Scott gave a demonstration of Galileo Galilei's 1589 discovery regarding free fall, specifically that "in the absence of air resistance, all objects experience the same acceleration due to gravity". During a telecast back to Earth, Scott released a hammer and a feather simultaneously to show that both would fall at the same rate and strike the ground at the same time. The lunar module lifted off with astronauts Scott and Irwin at 17:11 GMT (12:11 p.m. EST), docked with the lunar orbiter two hours later at 19:10.
- By a margin of one vote, the U.S. Senate approved legislation for the government to guarantee one quarter of a billion dollars in bank loans to the financially ailing Lockheed Aircraft Corporation, three days after the House of Representatives had approved the measure by only three votes. The vote in the Senate was 49 to 48 in favor, and the vote in the House on July 30 had been 192 to 189. The bill was then sent on to U.S. President Richard M. Nixon, who had advocated the $250,000,000 rescue of Lockheed, for his signature.
- U.S. Secretary of State William P. Rogers announced that the United States would support the entry of the People's Republic of China as a member of the United Nations, reversing a policy of almost 22 years of opposing representation by China's Communist government in the UN. Rogers declared that the U.S. would oppose the expulsion from the UN of the Republic of China, based on the island of Taiwan, which had claimed to represent the interests of the world's most populous nation even after being forced to abandon the mainland.
- Born: Ruth Lawrence, English child prodigy who graduated Oxford University at the age of 13 and became a mathematician; in Brighton
- Died: W. O. Bentley, 82, English car designer who founded Bentley Motors Ltd.

== August 3, 1971 (Tuesday) ==
- BOAC Flight 600, a Boeing 747 flying from Montreal to London, was diverted to Denver, Colorado, because of a bomb hoax inspired by the recent showing on TV of a 1966 film, The Doomsday Flight, and perhaps by a similar hoax involving Qantas Flight 755 on May 26. The aircraft, with 361 passengers and 22 crew, travelled 3,200 miles (5,100 km) out of its way to land in Denver, because the extortionist claimed that the bomb would be triggered if the altimeter fell below 5,000 feet (1,500 m). Denver's Stapleton International Airport was built at an elevation of 5,333 feet (1,625 m), a plot point in the film, which had been shown on July 24 on Montreal's CFCF-TV station.
- Died:
  - Georgy Babakin, 56, Russian space engineer;
  - Yanka Maur, 88, Belarusian writer

== August 4, 1971 (Wednesday) ==
- Morocco's King Hassan II announced the firing of his entire cabinet of advisors and the abolition of the office of Director General of the Royal Cabinet, higher in rank than the Prime Minister. Director General Driss Slaoui, Prime Minister Ahmed Laraki and Interior Minister Mohammed Oufkir were all fired, less than a month after the attempted coup d'état against King Hassan.
- Apollo 15 and its three astronauts left lunar orbit after having spent additional time, following the end of the crewed landing on the lunar surface, to make detailed photographs of the Moon from orbit.
- Born: Jeff Gordon, U.S. NASCAR driver and four-time NASCAR Cup Series champion (1995, 1997, 1998 and 2001); in Vallejo, California

== August 5, 1971 (Thursday) ==
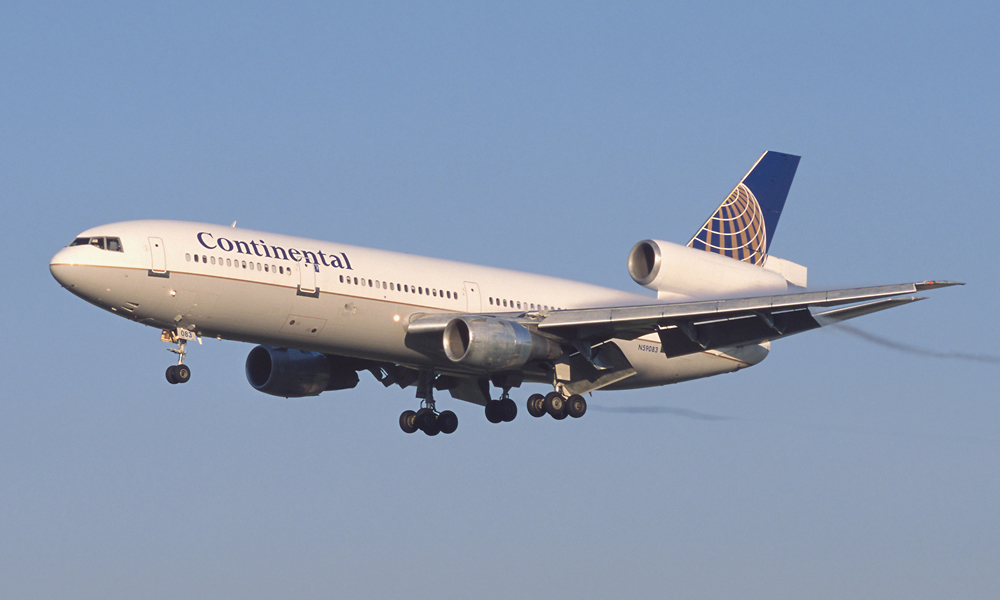
McDonnell Douglas DC-10

- The DC-10 jumbo jet went into commercial service, starting with an American Airlines flight from Los Angeles to Chicago.
- The Industrial Relations Act 1971 was given royal assent and became law in the United Kingdom, creating a process similar to the U.S. National Labor Relations Act of 1935 that created a National Industrial Relations Court (like the NLRB board in the U.S.). The new Court was empowered to order a "cooling off period" for strikes and to require secret balloting on the continuation or ending of a strike.
- The 1971 Draft Lottery for the Vietnam War was held in the United States. The first 1952 birthday to be selected for priority on the draft was for 18-year-old men who had been born on December 4, 1952.
- Born: Sally Nugent, English journalist, on the Wirral Peninsula
- Died: Jorge Antonio Ibañez, 17, Argentine rapist and murderer who was the accomplice of Carlos Robledo Puch on his first four serial killings, was killed in a car accident in Buenos Aires. Robledo, who had been driving, escaped uninjured and fled the scene.

== August 6, 1971 (Friday) ==
- Chay Blyth, a Scottish yachtsman who was nicknamed "Wrong Way Chay" by the British press, completed his trip around the world, becoming the first person to make a "solo nonstop sea voyage in a westerly direction", sailing against, rather than in the same direction as, the wind and prevailing sea currents. On his 59 ft (18 m) ketch, British Steel, Blyth had departed the Royal Southern Yacht Club center (at Hamble in Hampshire) on October 18, 1970, 292 days earlier, and was greeted by UK prime minister Edward Heath on his return, along with Prince Philip, Prince Charles and Princess Anne.
- A total lunar eclipse lasting 1 hour and 40 minutes was observed over Africa and Asia, rising over South America, and setting over Australia.

== August 7, 1971 (Saturday) ==
- The South Africa national rugby union team (the Springboks) finished their tour of Australia with an 18–6 win in their test match against the Wallabies at the Sydney Cricket Ground. The close of the Springboks' tour was frequently interrupted by anti-apartheid protesters.

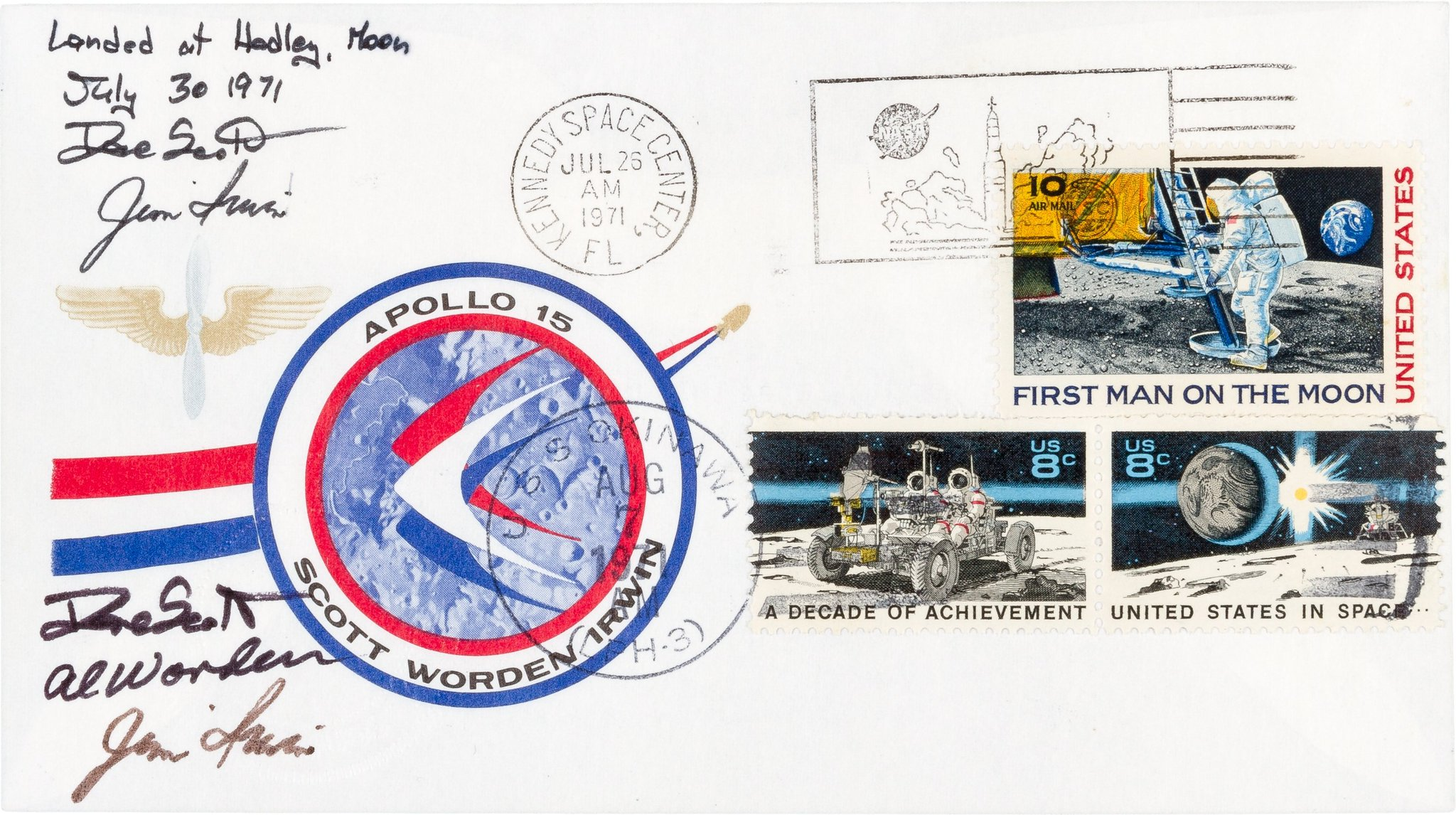
The "lunar merchandise" from the Apollo astronauts

- Apollo 15 returned to Earth. On re-entry, one of the capsule's three main parachutes was found to have deflated; but the safety of astronauts David Scott, James Irwin and Alfred Worden was not compromised. The splashdown point was 330 miles (530 km) north of Honolulu.
- The astronauts brought back with them 400 stamped envelopes to be sold to stamp collectors by Herman Sieger of West Germany, based on an increased value for having been taken to the Moon.
- Died:
  - Joseph W. Frazer, 79, U.S. auto manufacturer and co-founder of the Kaiser-Frazer Automobile Company
  - Henry D. "Homer" Haynes, 51, American country musician and comedian who was half of the Homer and Jethro duo, from a heart attack

== August 8, 1971 (Sunday) ==
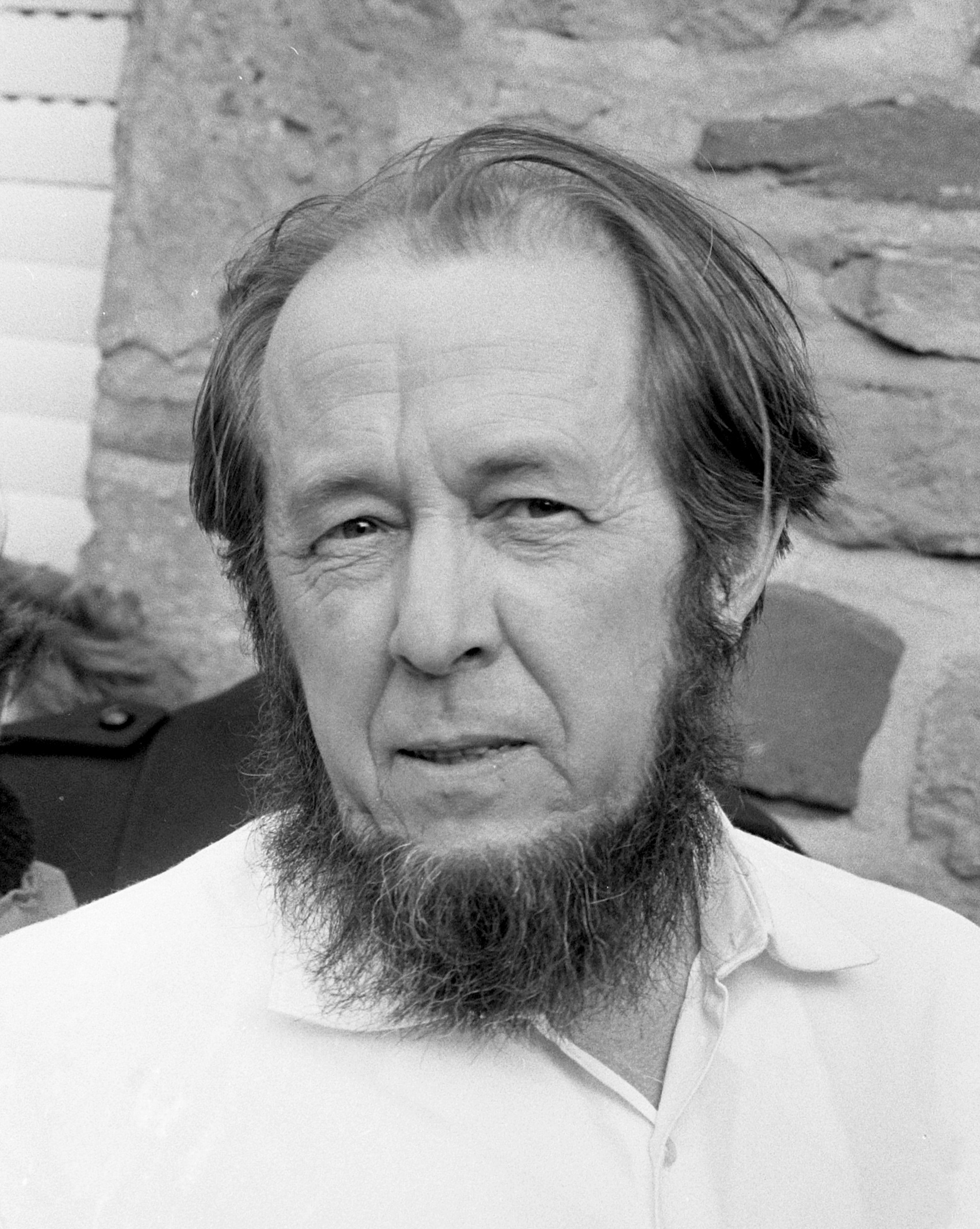
Solzhenitsyn

- The KGB attempted to poison dissident Soviet author Alexander Solzhenitsyn by putting an unidentified chemical agent on candy that Solzhenitsyn was purchasing at a department store in Novocherkassk, an event later referred to by KGB Colonel Boris Ivanov. Solzhenitsyn was ill for several months but survived the poisoning attempt.
- Elections were held in the Islamic Republic of Mauritania in North Africa. President Moktar Ould Daddah and the candidates of his Mauritanian People's Party, the only legal political party, were unopposed.
- Born: Naoko Kumagai, Japanese kickboxer and 3-time women's world champion of the World Kickboxing Association; in Yamanashi

== August 9, 1971 (Monday) ==
- The government of Northern Ireland, led by Prime Minister Brian Faulkner, began an ultimately unsuccessful policy of preventive detention of suspected terrorists, implementing the "Special Powers Act". In a two-day operation, Operation Demetrius, British security forces arrested 337 Northern Irish nationalists on suspicion of affiliation with the Irish Republican Army terrorist organization and detained them without trial in Long Kesh prison. About 70 of the 337 were released soon after the roundup, and after five weeks, Faulkner signed internment orders for 219 of the suspects, directing that they be held indefinitely in prison. The policy would continue until December 5, 1975, during which 1,981 people would be arrested and detained in prison without trial, of whom 94.6% (1,874) were Roman Catholic.
- India and the Soviet Union signed a "Treaty of Friendship and Nonagression" on the day that Soviet Premier Alexei Kosygin arrived in New Delhi, with both nations agreeing to support each other if either was the target of military aggression. Minister for External Affairs, Swaran Singh, signed on behalf of India, after which Kosygin met with India's prime minister Indira Gandhi.
- Died: Otto Wagener, 83, German general and former economic advisor to Adolf Hitler

== August 10, 1971 (Tuesday) ==
- Concerned that the government of Pakistan was preparing to execute Bangladeshi rebel leader Mujibur Rahman, India's prime minister Indira Gandhi sent an urgent message to the leaders of other world nations and to the United Nations, to put pressure on Pakistan's President Yahya Khan to spare Mujibur's life. The warning was successful in postponing a trial for treason that had been announced by Yahya Khan. Mujibur would finally be released on January 8, 1972, and become the leader of Bangladesh.
- The British government issued a "state of exception" to the suspension of the Habeas Corpus Act 1679 that had been made under the Special Powers Act to make arrests and preventive detention of suspected Irish Republican Army sympathizers in Northern Ireland. The British authorized the International Committee of the Red Cross to send observers from Geneva to visit political detainees imprisoned in Ulster province. Although the Red Cross visits were similar to the rights accorded under the Geneva Convention to independent verification of the conditions of prisoners of war, the government declined to classify the Ulster detainees as political prisoners. The government later broke with normal practice and authorized the publication of the ICRC delegates reports.
- The Society for American Baseball Research (SABR), an organization of people dedicated to the research and publishing of the history of baseball, was founded by U.S. government employee L. Robert Davids and 15 other researchers in a meeting at the National Baseball Hall of Fame and Museum in Cooperstown, New York.
- The Federal Boat Safety Act of 1971 was signed into law by U.S. President Nixon, authorizing the U.S. Coast Guard to issue specific regulations on the standards for boats operating in coastal waters. Noting that drownings accounted for 70 percent of the fatalities in recreational boating, the USCG required that small craft under 20.1 feet (6.1 m) in length had to be required with level flotation protectors to allow boats to stay level when swamped and to allow operators and passengers to climb back to safety.
- Roger Hargreaves's "Mr. Men" series of preschool children's books, was first published, originally as a release from Faber Press. The six books in the bestselling initial series were "Mr. Tickle", "Mr. Greedy", "Mr. Happy", "Mr. Nosey", "Mr. Sneeze" and "Mr. Bump". The success led to 84 more books of "Mr. Men" and "Little Misses" cartoon characters.
- Born: Roy Keane, Irish football midfielder with 67 appearances for the Ireland national team, in Mayfield, Cork

== August 11, 1971 (Wednesday) ==
- The Twenty-fourth Amendment of the Constitution of India, permitting the Indian Parliament to suspend the Fundamental Rights guaranteed in Part III of the original constitution, was approved by the Indian Parliament to be sent for ratification by the legislatures of the various Indian states.
- Construction work began on the Louisiana Superdome in the U.S. in New Orleans.

== August 12, 1971 (Thursday) ==
- Australia's prime minister William McMahon fired his Minister of Defence and immediate predecessor, John Gorton, after the two had a confrontation in the Australian House of Representatives. In March, Gorton had stepped down as prime minister and leader of Australia's Liberal Party, in return for receiving a prominent role in McMahon's cabinet during a governmental crisis.
- An estimated 3,000 people from Belfast and Derry fled to the Republic of Ireland to escape the latest outbreak of violence.
- Syria severed diplomatic relations with Jordan because of border clashes.
- Soviet athlete Faina Melnik, representing the Soviet Union, broke the Women's Discus world record with a throw of 64.22 metres at the European Athletics Championships in Helsinki.
- The USSR's Soyuz-L carrier rocket made its third and last flight.
- Born:
  - Michael Ian Black, American actor, comedian, writer and director, in Chicago
  - Pete Sampras, American tennis player with seven Wimbledon singles championships and five in the U.S. Open; in Washington, D.C.
  - Yvette Nicole Brown, American TV comedian and actress, in East Cleveland, Ohio

== August 13, 1971 (Friday) ==
- U.S. President Nixon met in a closed conference at Camp David with his economic advisors, including Federal Reserve Board chairman Arthur Burns, U.S. Treasury Secretary John Connally, and the U.S. Undersecretary for International Monetary Affairs and future Fed Chairman Paul Volcker, on the question of whether to devalue the U.S. dollar and removing the U.S. from the Bretton Woods Agreement.
- On the tenth anniversary of the construction of the Berlin Wall, the city of West Berlin dedicated the Weiße Kreuze ("White Crosses") garden as a memorial for the 102 fatalities at the Berlin Wall up to that point. By the time the Wall was opened in 1989, the number of crosses had increased to 140. In East Berlin, the anniversary was marked by parades honoring ten years of the Antifaschistischer Schutzwall ("anti-Fascist protective wall"), with a banner bearing the slogan "10 years of secure protection of peace and socialism".
- Born:
  - Heike Makatsch, German actress, in Düsseldorf
  - Tragedy Khadafi (stage name for Percy Lee Chapman), American rapper, in Queensbridge
- Died: King Curtis (stage name for Curtis Montgomery), 37, Grammy Award-winning American saxophonist and posthumous inductee into the Rock and Roll Hall of Fame, was stabbed to death after getting into an argument on the stoop of his Manhattan apartment with a man.

== August 14, 1971 (Saturday) ==
- The controversial Stanford prison experiment, led by Stanford University psychology professor Philip Zimbardo, began in Palo Alto, California, using college student volunteers to play the roles of guards or prisoners, starting with simulated arrests being made by the Palo Alto Police Department. Over a period of seven days, the "guards" with unrestricted authority became more abusive, and the study ended ahead of schedule when Professor Zimbardo's colleagues, notably psychologist Christina Maslach, confronted him over the morality of the experiment. The student volunteers were paid $15 (equivalent to $100 a day in 2021) and paid for the 14 days agreed upon.
- British troops in Northern Ireland were stationed on the border with the Republic of Ireland to stop arms smuggling.

== August 15, 1971 (Sunday) ==
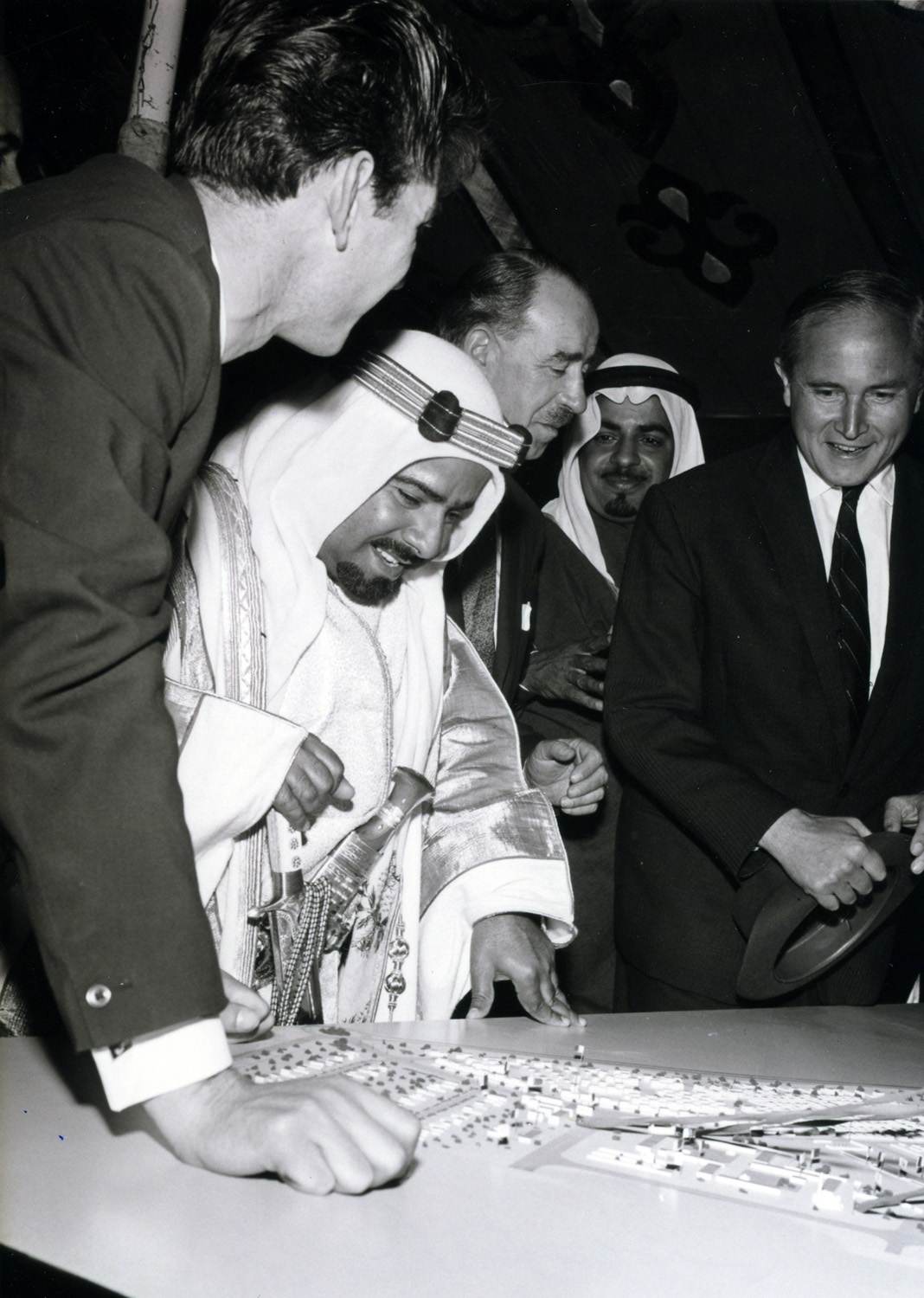
Emir Isa bin Salman Al Khalifa

- Bahrain, a British protectorate on the Arabian Peninsula, declared its independence from the United Kingdom after being unable to form an agreement with the Trucial States that had formed the United Arab Emirates. On August 12, Sheik Isa bin Sulman al-Khalifa had announced that the 200,000-person sheikdom had decided against joining the UAE and that the formal proclamation would come on Sunday. Full independence and the withdrawal of British troops would come on December 16.
- U.S. President Richard Nixon announced the issuance of Executive Order 11615, the implementation of "Phase I" of the Economic Stabilization Act of 1970, an immediate 90-day "freeze" on all wages and prices nationwide. Upon the expiration of the 90 days on November 14, Nixon would implement "Phase II", maintaining wage controls and eliminating the control of prices on certain goods and services. At the same time, Nixon announced that the United States would no longer convert dollars to gold at a fixed value, effectively ending the Bretton Woods system. Nixon addressed the nation on television and said, "I have directed Secretary Connally to suspend temporarily the convertibility of the dollar into gold or other reserve assets, except in amounts and conditions determined to be in the interest of monetary stability and in the best interests of the United States.". Within 10 days, the value of the U.S. dollar had declined by more than 11 percent against the Japanese yen, the worth for $1 falling from ¥360 to ¥320, and seven percent against the West German Deutsche Mark, from DM 3.66 to DM 3.40.
- In the U.S., voting was held for the Principal Chief of the Cherokee Nation, consisting of 14 counties in northeastern Oklahoma and with a capital at Tahlequah in Cherokee County. W. W. "Bill" Keeler, chairman of the Board of the Phillips Petroleum Company, was the winner in the first elections for the office since 1903, defeating five other candidates and winning 7,495 of the votes cast. The next highest number of votes was for Reverend Sam Hider, the only full-blooded Cherokee in the race, who got 1,624. Keeler was one-eighth Cherokee, by his great-grandmother. Keeler had been the Principal Chief since 1949, when he was appointed by U.S. President Harry Truman.
- The first LGBT rights organizations in Germany and in Mexico were founded on the same day, with Homosexuelle Aktion Westberlin (HAW) being created in West Berlin and Frente de Liberacion Homosexual established in Mexico City.
- The 1971 Women's World Cup in Association football (an event not recognized by FIFA) opened in Mexico.
- British driver Jackie Stewart became Formula One World Drivers' Champion in the Tyrrell 003-Cosworth.
- Died: Paul Lukas (stage name for Pál Lukács), 76, Hungarian-born actor and winner of the Academy Award for Best Actor in 1943

== August 16, 1971 (Monday) ==
- The Pakistani ship SS Al-Abbas was destroyed and sunk in the Bay of Bengal by commandos of the Bangladesh guerrilla group Mukti Bahini. The Bengali naval frogmen, trained by the Indian Navy, attached limpet mines to the underside of the large freighter while it was anchored at the port of Chittagong, as one of the major acts in Operation Jackpot.
- Eighty-eight of the 92 people aboard the Hong Kong passenger ferry SS Fatshan were killed when the ship capsized during Typhoon Rose and went down near Lantau Island.
- Hastings Kamuzu Banda, the President of Malawi, became the first head of state to visit white-ruled South Africa since King George VI of the United Kingdom had toured in 1947. President Banda, who arrived at Waterkloof Air Base in Pretoria with Malawian government officials and their wives, was the first black African leader to make a state visit to South Africa since the implementation of apartheid, and was welcomed by South Africa's white president, J. J. Fouché and an honor guard, then traveled to Johannesburg for dinner with Prime Minister John Vorster.
- Born: Lovemore N'dou, South African boxer; IBF junior-welterweight champion and later IBO welterweight champion; in Musina, Limpopo province

== August 17, 1971 (Tuesday) ==
- Australian Senator Magnus Cormack (Lib.-Victoria) was elected President of the Australian Senate, 31 to 26 over Justin O'Byrne (Lab.-Tasmania).
- Died: Maedayama Eigorō, 57, Japanese sumo wrestler and only the 39th to reach the supreme rank of Yokozuna; from cirrhosis of the liver.

== August 18, 1971 (Wednesday) ==
- Australia and New Zealand announced the withdrawal of their troops from South Vietnam, and an end to their participation in the Vietnam War, with the 1st Australian Task Force to depart in October. Australia still had 6,000 combat troops in South Vietnam, down from a high of 8,000, while New Zealand still had 264 remaining in war zones.
- All 37 U.S. Army personnel on a CH-47 Chinook helicopter were killed when the aircraft crashed in West Germany while flying troops to a field exercise. The helicopter, flying from Ludwigsburg to the Grafenwoehr Training Area, was carrying a crew of 4 and 33 members of the 56th Artillery Brigade, and lost its rear rotor during the early-morning flight. The wreckage was found in a field about 1 mile (1.6 km) from the town of Pegnitz in Bavaria.
- Former New York City businessman Joel David Kaplan escaped from a Mexican prison after being flown out by a helicopter that had landed inside the walls of the Santa Martha Acatitla prison yard at Iztapalapa near Mexico City. Kaplan had been incarcerated since 1962 after murdering an associate. His rescue would later be dramatized in the 1975 action film Breakout.
- Died: Peter Fleming 64, British adventurer and writer, brother of James Bond creator Ian Fleming.

== August 19, 1971 (Thursday) ==
- A right-wing military coup in Bolivia by Army Colonel Hugo Banzer Suarez, against the government of left-wing President Juan José Torres, began a brief civil war within the South American nation. The uprising began with a mutiny at a Bolivian Army garrison in Santa Cruz, 300 miles (480 km) from the Bolivian capital of La Paz. General Banzer, former director of the Bolivian Military Academy, was arrested along with 30 people on charges of subversion, and anti-government rebels freed him from jail, seized the city's radio stations, and proclaimed Banzer President of Bolivia. At the same time, President Torres called upon his supporters to march into Santa Cruz and suppress the rebellion.
- Died:
  - Errol John Emanuel, 52, Australian District Commissioner in the East New Britain district of Papua New Guinea, was killed while acting as a peace negotiator;
  - Reinhold Maier, 81, German politician

== August 20, 1971 (Friday) ==
- At Damascus in Syria, the presidents of Syria, Egypt and Libya signed a constitution for the Federation of Arab Republics, providing for all three men (Hafez al-Assad of Syria, Anwar Sadat of Egypt and Muammar Gaddafi of Libya) to be part of a three-member joint presidency. Under the terms of the document, decisions on domestic matters could be made by a 2 to 1 majority of presidents, while matters of war or peace had to be approved unanimously.
- The International Telecommunications Satellite Organization (Intelsat) was created by a treaty, becoming effective on February 12, 1973.
- The USS Manatee (AO-58) spilled 1,000 gallons of fuel oil, that washed up on President Nixon's Western White House beach in San Clemente, California.
- The life imprisonment sentence for U.S. Army 1st Lieutenant William L. Calley, issued following a court martial, was reduced to 20 years incarceration by order of Lieutenant General Albert O. Connor, commander of the Third U.S. Army. and be reduced further to 10 years. He would be released in 1974.
- Died: Matiur Rahman, 26, military pilot, was killed while attempting to hijack a T-33 trainer aircraft in order to defect from the Pakistan Air Force to join the Liberation movement of Bangladesh. Rahman took off from Karachi and was shot down before he could reach the airspace of India.

== August 21, 1971 (Saturday) ==
- Nine people were killed and 95 injured in Manila's Plaza Miranda in an attack on a Philippine Liberal Party political rally. The rally was being shown on Manila television and had attracted 10,000 supporters; at 9:13 p.m., the first explosion took place, followed moments later by a second blast. Most of the Liberal Party candidates for upcoming Senate elections were injured in the bombing attack made by the Communist New People's Army (Bagong Hukbong Bayan). Seriously injured in the blast were Senators Sergio Osmeña Jr. and Jovito Salonga, and Representative Ramon Bagatsing.
- For the first time since the end of the Korean War in 1953, representatives of North Korea and South Korea met to discuss agreements between the two nations. The meeting of Red Cross officials from both countries took place at Panmunjom and lasted for only four minutes, but "marked what could be the start on a long road toward a thaw in the relations between the two parts of Korea" in the opinion of one observer.

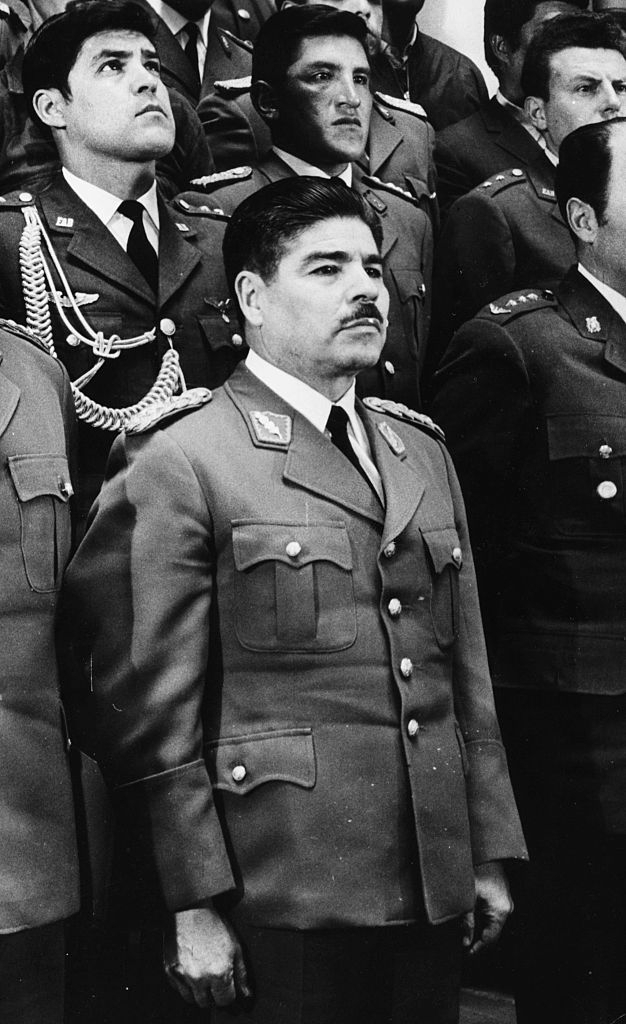
Deposed President Torres

- Anti-government rebels within the Bolivian Army seized the Presidential Palace in La Paz, two days after the uprising had started in Santa Cruz. President Juan José Torres was forced to flee to the headquarters of the only Bolivian Army unit that still supported him, the Colorados Battalion. The turning point in the rebellion came when the Army's Castrillo Regiment turned its support to the rebels and to Colonel Banzer.
- George Jackson, an African-American activist imprisoned for murder at the maximum security San Quentin State Prison, attempted to escape from incarceration when he and other prisoners took eight hostages. Five of the hostages— three corrections officers and two white prisoners— were killed. Jackson and fellow inmate Johnny Spain used keys to reach the prison yard, where Jackson was shot dead by a prison tower guard. Jackson's lawyer, Stephen M. Bingham, was later charged with five counts of murder after investigators determined that he had smuggled a gun into the San Quentin prison and given it to Jackson.

== August 22, 1971 (Sunday) ==
- The three-man military junta formally named Bolivian Army Colonel Hugo Banzer Suarez as the new President of Bolivia, and reported that more than 70 people had died during the fighting that overthrew President Juan José Torres. The other two members of the junta were General Jaime Florentino Mendieta and Colonel Andres Selich. Torres was permitted to depart Bolivia, along with 31 members of his family and his government, on August 26 when a Peruvian Air Force DC-6 flew him into exile in Lima.
- The Prosecutor General of Egypt issued an indictment of 91 former officials for treason, including Vice President Aly Sabry, Minister of War Mohamed Fawzi and Minister of the Interior Sharawy Gomaa, in addition to five other government ministers who had served on President Anwar Sadat's cabinet. All were accused of a plot in May to overthrow President Sadat. Prosecutor Abou Zeid said that trial of the 91 would begin almost immediately, on August 25.
- Born: Richard Armitage, English actor, in Leicester

== August 23, 1971 (Monday) ==
- The 24 remaining members of "Unit 684", a commando team of the South Korean Air Force charged with developing plans to assassinate General Secretary of the Workers' Party of Korea Kim Il Sung, mutinied against their guards on the island of Silmido after their mission had been canceled by the South Korean government. After arriving on the South Korean mainland, they hijacked a bus at Inchon and had reached Seoul when they were stopped at an army checkpoint at Daebang-dong. In the shootout that followed, all but four of the Unit 684 commandos were killed or committed suicide. The cover story given by the South Korean government at the time was that the Unit 684 group had been 21 "North Korean agents". The true details of their mutiny and the nature of their mission would not be revealed until nearly 30 years later.
- Representatives of the "Big Four" nations that had occupied various zones of Germany since the end of World War II— the United States, the Soviet Union, the United Kingdom and France— signed an accord on the future of West Berlin after almost 17 months of negotiations. Specifically, travel on the three West Berlin Air Corridors and the highway, railroad and canal corridors connecting West Germany to West Berlin (which was surrounded by the territory of East Germany) was guaranteed to be unimpeded. In addition, the two million residents of West Berlin would be permitted periodic visits to East Berlin, which had been barred since 1966. For the first time in nearly 20 years, West Germans would be allowed to travel to the rest of East Germany, which had been closed to them since 1952. The agreement, however, did not contemplate the removal of the Berlin Wall (which would stand for another 18 years until 1989) and would not prohibit East German border guards from shooting East Germans attempting to escape.
- Ireland's prime minister Jack Lynch met with opposition members of Northern Ireland's parliament, and announced a campaign of civil disobedience to achieve their goal of a united Ireland. Northern Ireland's prime minister, Brian Faulkner, responded the next day that "Neither the United Kingdom nor the Northern Ireland Government will be shaken in their resolve to maintain Northern Ireland as an integral part of the U.K. by any campaign— be it outright terrorism or political blackmail."
- Born: Gretchen Whitmer, American politician and Governor of Michigan since 2019; in Lansing, Michigan
- Died:
  - "Shamu", about 10 years old, the first orca of that name to perform at SeaWorld in San Diego.
  - Gerry Richardson, Superintendent of the UK's Lancashire Constabulary, after attempting to disarm a group of armed robbers. He was posthumously awarded the George Cross for heroism the following year.

== August 24, 1971 (Tuesday) ==
- The decision by Canada, to dismantle its nuclear-tipped Bomarc anti-aircraft missiles, was announced by Donald Macdonald, Canada's Minister of National Defence. Since 1962, the missiles, which the government of Pierre Trudeau had concluded to be obsolete, had been maintained at the Canadian Forces Bases in North Bay, Ontario and La Macaza, Quebec.
- India's national cricket team ended England's unbeaten streak of 26 Test match wins over three years, and marked India's first-ever defeat of England in England. India won by 4 wickets at The Oval in Kensington.
- Born: Pierfrancesco Favino, Italian film and TV actor known for Romanzo Criminale and in the U.S. for Night at the Museum; in Rome.

== August 25, 1971 (Wednesday) ==
- Border clashes occurred between Tanzania and Uganda, and Tanzanian officials at Dar Es Salaam reported that four Tanzanians had been killed, including border police commander Hans Poppe, whose body was taken across the border. The day before, Ugandan leader Idi Amin said that Tanzanian troops had seized four unarmed members of the Ugandan Army and that Ugandan forces then captured heavy artillery, ammunition and vehicles from the Tanzanian army in a clash near the Ugandan village of Mutukula. Amin said the body of Poppe, whom he called a Communist Chinese officer in a Tanzanian uniform, was displayed in Kampala at the International Conference Center.
- Floods in Bangladesh and eastern Bengal caused thousands to flee the region.
- Born: Crash Holly (ring name for Michael J. Lockwood), American professional wrestler who worked for the World Wrestling Federation from 1999 until his death from a drug overdose; in San Francisco (d. 2003)

== August 26, 1971 (Thursday) ==
- Queen Juliana of the Netherlands became the first Dutch monarch to visit Indonesia, which had been the Dutch East Indies colony for 343 years until becoming independent in 1945. In 1949, Queen Juliana had signed the documents fully relinquishing any Netherlands sovereignty over Indonesia. Juliana and her husband, Prince Bernhard, received an enthusiastic welcome from Indonesians after having been invited by President Suharto for a state visit. After Queen Juliana declared in a speech that "I consider it a privilege to make the acquaintance of this great and fascinating country for the first time," President Suharto said "We are thankful for the understanding and help of the Dutch people toward our efforts to develop ourselves in accordance with our concepts and aspirations."
- The first online library computer network, OCLC, began for cataloging at Ohio University, initially as a plan for college libraries in the U.S. state of Ohio to be able to inquire about each other's book holdings via modem. Founded in 1967, OCLC stood for the Ohio College Library Center, and would be limited to that state until 1978, when it changed its name (but kept its initials) as the Online Computer Library Center. In 2003, it would become the producer of WorldCat for use on the internet.
- Greece's prime minister George Papadopoulos replaced many of his military supporters who had placed him in power in a coup d'état in 1967, and appointed seven civilians to the cabinet as part of a decree reorganizing his government. The former ministries of labor, industry, agriculture, commerce, economic coordination and liaison to the premier were consolidated into a single "Ministry of the National Economy", headed by university engineering professor George Pezopoulos, while engineer Constantine Panayotakis was appointed to lead the new "Ministry of Civilization and the Sciences". Papadopoulos appointed himself as Minister of Defense and Minister of Foreign Affairs.
- Born: Thalía (stage name for Ariadna Thalía Sodi Miranda), Mexican actress and singer, in Mexico City
- Died: John Leacroft, 82, British World War I fighter ace with 22 shootdowns

== August 27, 1971 (Friday) ==
- The African nation of Chad ended all diplomatic relations with the United Arab Republic (Egypt) after accusing the Egyptians of financing an attempted coup d'état by Chadian Army General Ahmed Abdallah. Foreign Minister Baba Hassan said that General Abdallah had committed suicide after failing in an attempt to install a puppet government to replace President Francois Tombalbaye.
- Died:
  - Bennett Cerf, 73, American humorist and founder of Random House publishing
  - Margaret Bourke-White, 67, American photojournalist.
  - Lil Hardin Armstrong, 73, American jazz musician and former wife of Louis Armstrong, died of a heart attack while playing the piano at an open air concert in honor of her husband. Mrs. Armstrong was at the Civic Center Plaza in Chicago and was performing the song "St. Louis Blues" when she collapsed on stage.

== August 28, 1971 (Saturday) ==
- The crash of MALEV Hungarian Airlines Flight 731 killed all nine crew and all but two of the 25 passengers aboard. The Ilyushin Il-18 jet was approaching its landing in Copenhagen in Denmark after departing Oslo in Norway, and had an ultimate destination of Budapest. Pilot Dezső Szentgyörgyi, the top-scoring Hungarian fighter ace of World War II, was among those who were killed.
- The Greek ferry Heleanna, with more than 100 people on board, caught fire in the Ionian Sea as it traveled from Patras in Greece to Ancona in Italy. Almost everyone on the Heleanna escaped injury, but 25 people were killed. More than five years later, ferry Captain Dimitrios Antipas was sentenced by a Greek court to 21 months in prison for manslaughter and First Mate Ioannes Kofinas to 11 months, with sentences suspended as long as probation terms were complied with.
- George Hislop organized Canada's first gay rights demonstration, on Parliament Hill in Ottawa.
- The 56-year old comic strip Freckles and His Friends was published for the last time. Merrill Blosser had written the comic, which followed the adventures of a teenaged boy and his pals, for more than 50 years, starting on August 16, 1915, before turning over the responsibility of Henry Formhals in 1966.
- Born:
  - Janet Evans, American swimmer, in Fullerton, California
  - Zhang Haijie, Singaporean journalist and TV presenter, in Xi'an, China

== August 29, 1971 (Sunday) ==
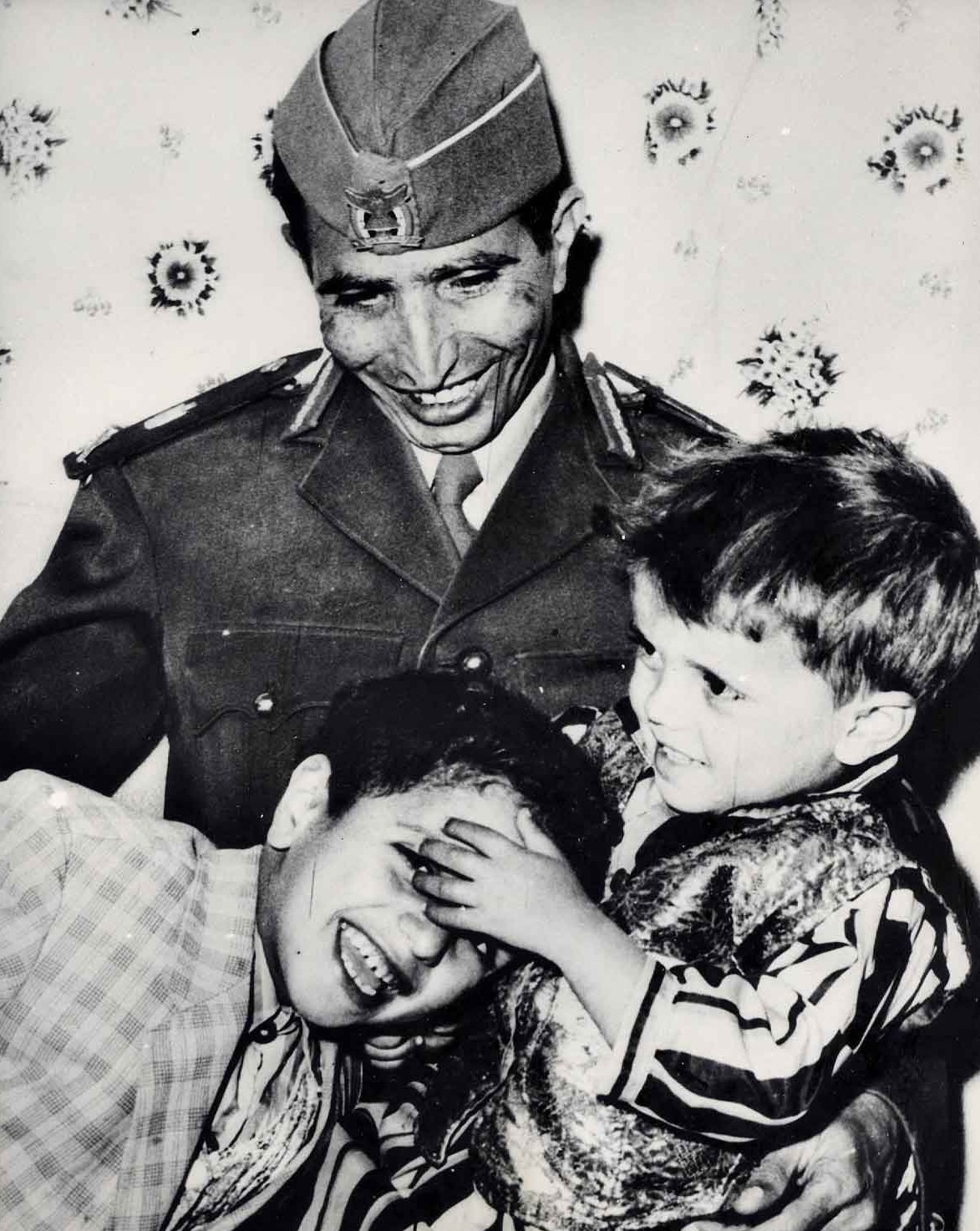
Major General Amri

- Major General Hassan al-Amri, in his fifth term as Prime Minister of the Yemen Arab Republic, shot and killed a photographer during an altercation that began after "crossed wires" on a telephone line had led to Amri calling the photographer by mistake. According to the reconstruction of the event, on August 25, Major General Amri was trying to call the chief of guards at the Yemen Army headquarters in Sanaa and the call went instead to the photo studio of Mohsen al-Harazi. Amri thought he was speaking to a subordinate officer; Harazi thought he was speaking to a prankster; and an argument ensued. Amri eventually identified Harazi and had him arrested and brought to the Army headquarters. After beating Harazi, Amri ordered the guards to execute Harazi on the spot; when the guards refused to obey the order, Amri took one of the guard's pistols and executed the photographer himself. Upon learning of the incident, President Abdul Rahman al-Eryani summoned Amri to his office and gave him a choice of resigning all of his posts or standing trial for murder. Amri chose the former course on September 4 and was taken to the airport in Sanaa to be put on a flight to exile in Beirut.
- The last legislative elections for South Vietnam were conducted with 1,240 candidates competing to fill the 159 seats of the Republic of Vietnam House of Representatives.
- Died:
  - Nathan F. Leopold, 66, American ornithologist and author who, with fellow college student Richard Loeb, carried out the 1924 kidnapping and thrill-killing of 14-year old Bobby Franks. Spared the death penalty and sentenced to life imprisonment, Leopold was paroled after almost 34 years and he spent the rest of his life in Puerto Rico.
  - Emma Gelders Sterne, 77, American author of children's books
  - Leonard John Brass, 71, Australian-American botanist and explorer

== August 30, 1971 (Monday) ==
- The Progressive Conservatives under Peter Lougheed defeated the Social Credit government under Harry E. Strom in a general election, ending 36 years of uninterrupted power for the Social Credit Party in Alberta. The Social Credit Party's 55 to 10 majority in the Alberta House of Representatives gave way to a 49 to 25 majority for the PC party.
- The first surgery to remove radioactive plutonium from a person's lungs, a bronchoalveolar lavage of particles, was performed at the Bataan Memorial Methodist Hospital (now the Lovelace Medical Center) in Albuquerque, New Mexico. The patient, not identified, was a 37-year-old man who worked as a lab technician in Colorado.

== August 31, 1971 (Tuesday) ==
- Oleg Lyalin, a Soviet KGB agent stationed in Britain, was arrested for drunken driving in London by officer Charles Shearer. Although Lyalin's employers at the Soviet Trade Delegation posted his bail of 50 pounds, the British MI5 intelligence agency took Lyalin into custody, where he offered to identify KGB agents stationed in the UK in return for being given a new identity for himself and his secretary as part of Britain's witness protection program. Lyalin's information would lead to the expulsion of 105 Soviet officials on September 25.
- Australian long-distance runner Adrienne Beames became the first woman to break the three-hour barrier in the marathon, finishing in 2:46:30 at Werribee .
- Abdul Motaleb Malik took office as the last Pakistani- appointed Governor of East Pakistan to suppress the Bangladesh rebellion. Malik replaced Lieutenant General Tikka Khan, who had ruled as the military governor since March. Malik and his cabinet would rule East Pakistan until December 14, when East Pakistan became the Republic of Bangladesh.
- The Sriramshi and Raniganj Bazar massacres took place in Bangladesh.

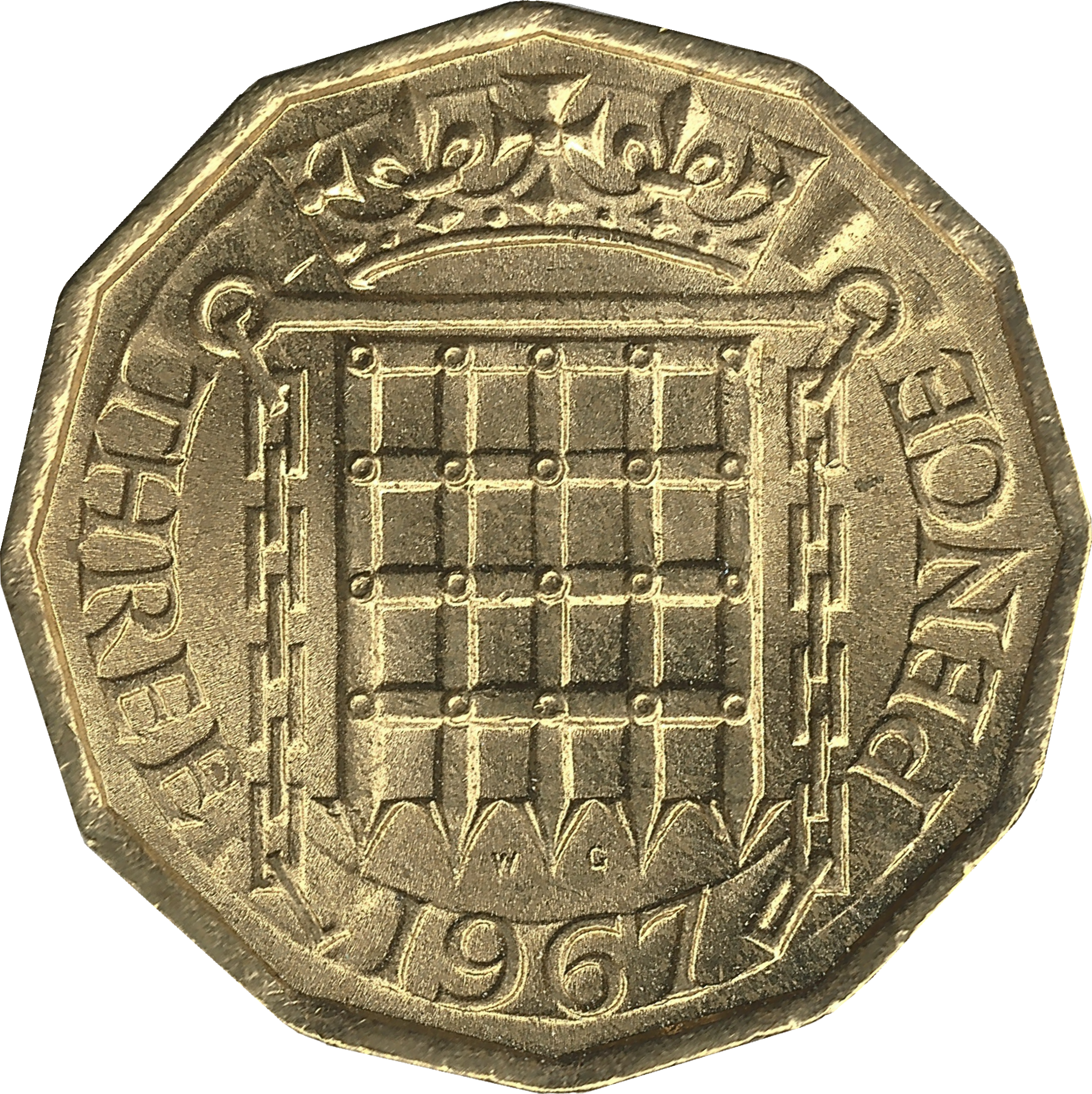
Retired threepence

- Britain's transition to decimal currency was completed as the old penny and the threepence were taken out of circulation by the British government and no longer recognised as legal tender.
