= Freckles and His Friends =

American comic strip

- Author(s): Merrill Blosser (1915-1966); Henry Formhals (1935-1971)
- Current status/schedule: Complete
- Launch date: August 16, 1915; 111 years ago (Dailies), December 31, 1933; 92 years ago (Sundays)
- End date: August 28, 1971; 55 years ago (Dailies), August 22, 1971; 55 years ago (Sundays)
- Alternate name: Freckles
- Syndicate: Newspaper Enterprise Association
- Genre(s): Humor, Children, Teens, Adults

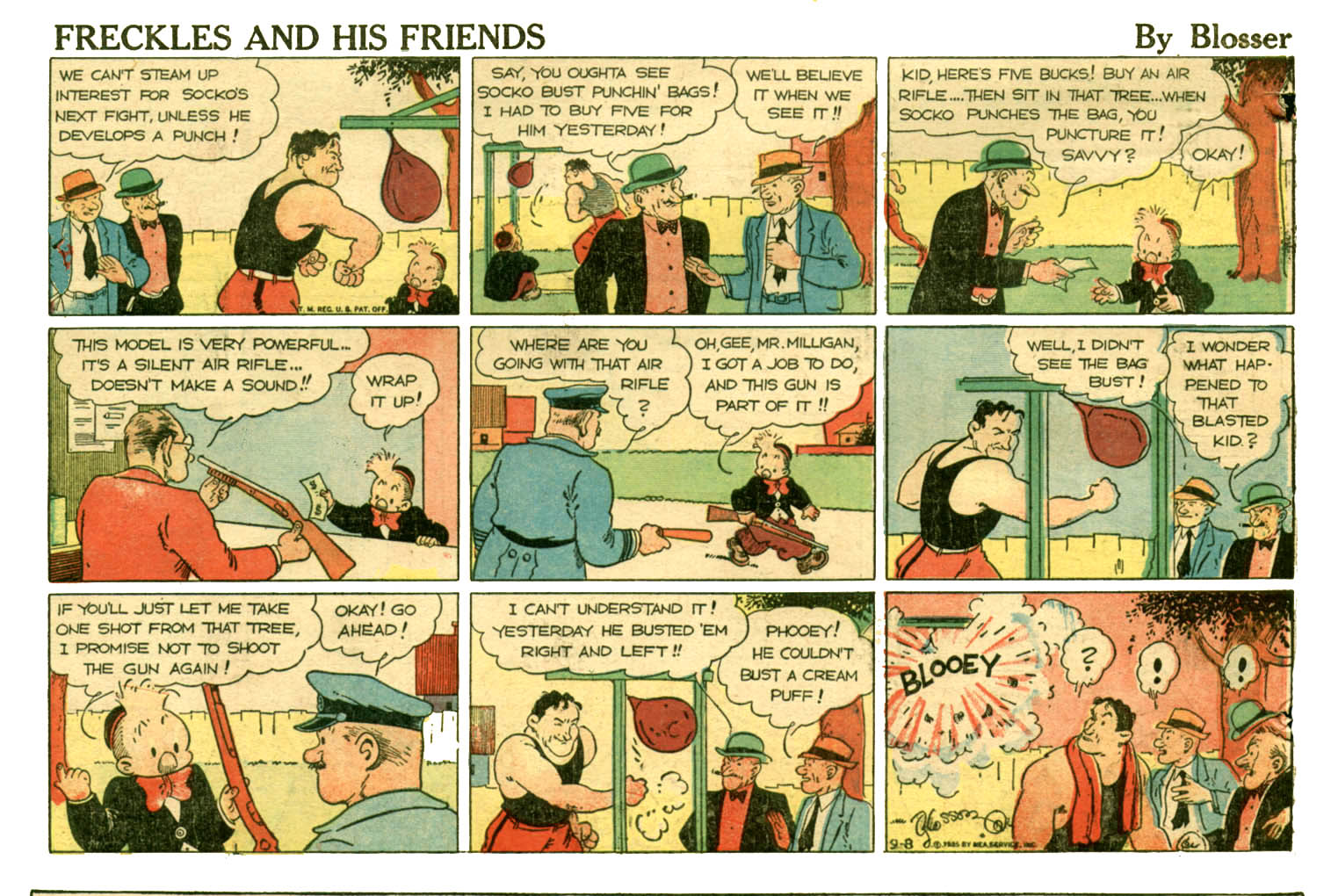
Merrill Blosser's Freckles and His Friends (September 8, 1935). Freckles does not appear in this installment. The young character seen here is Oscar.

Freckles and his Friends is an American comic strip set in the peaceful small town of Shadyside where young Freckles McGoosey and his friends lived. Although the long-running strip, created by Merrill Blosser, is remembered for its continuing storyline involving a group of teenagers, it originally featured a child at the age of six or seven in gag-a-day situations.

Illustrated by Blosser and later by Henry Formhals (1908–1981), Freckles and His Friends was ghostwritten by Fred Fox (1903–1981). A gagwriter for Groucho Marx and Judy Canova, Fox scripted for radio, television and films. Widely syndicated by Newspaper Enterprise Association, Freckles and His Friends had a long run through much of the 20th century.

== Publication history ==
In May 1915, 23-year-old Merrill Blosser began working for the Chicago syndicate Newspaper Enterprise Association, initially drawing cartoons based on news events. That summer he began drawing five comics features. One of these, titled Freckles, began as a one-column daily gag panel on August 16, 1915. that expanded into a full comic strip and was retitled Freckles and His Friends on September 20, 1915. One by one, Blosser dropped each of the other single-panel comics and, in July 1916, he began another strip, Miniature Movies, which soon became Chestnut Charlie, continuing until early in 1918. At that point, Blosser then dedicated himself exclusively to the production of Freckles and His Friends.

The daily strip gained readers through the 1920s and into the 1930s when a Sunday strip was added on December 31, 1933. By 1939, according to Editor & Publisher, the Sunday strip was published in 130 newspapers, while the daily strip appeared in more than 500 papers. During the World War II years, Blosser's creation was seen by some 60,000,000 readers.

Freckles and His Friends had several toppers during the strip's run: Mom n' Pop aka The Newfangles (Feb 1924 - Feb 1936), Bucky the Little Old Man (Oct 1926 - June 1929), Comic Scrap Book (April-Sept 1932), Rebus Rimes (May-Oct 1933), Cutie Cut-Ups (July 1933-Jan 1934), Hi-Ho (Oct 1933), Fold-Up House (Dec 1933 - April 1934), Freckles' Fan Fare (Oct 1943 - July 1944), and Hector (Sept 1944 - Jan 1973).

== Characters and story ==
Freckles and his Friends (September 21, 1915)

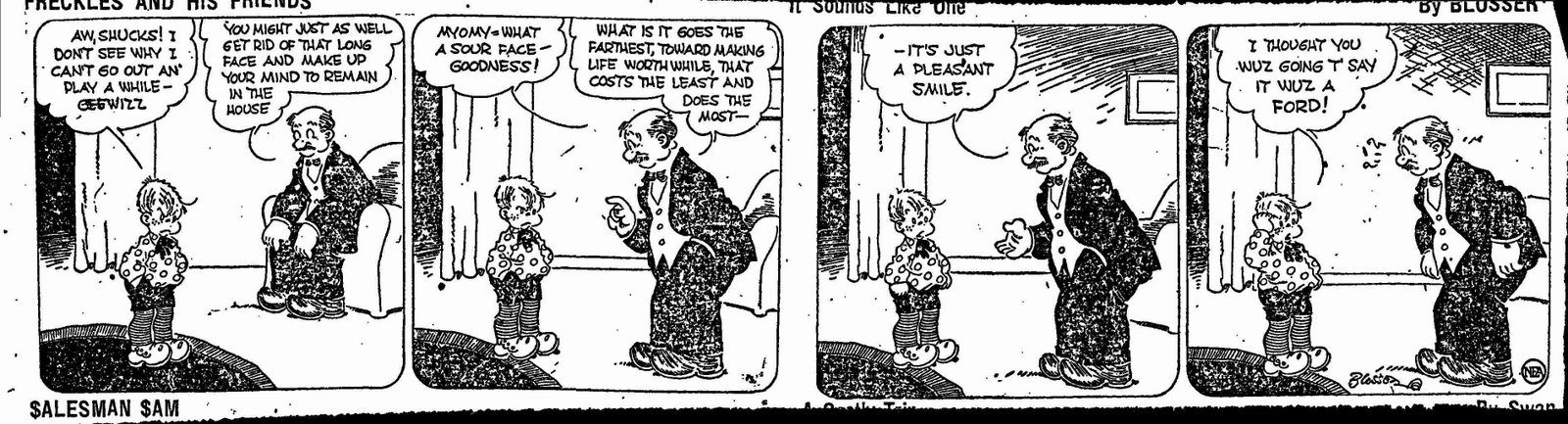
Freckles and his Friends (January 12, 1924)

Freckles and his Friends (February 6, 1947)

When Blosser began the strip in 1915, he simply devised daily gags and problems for his child character Freckles to encounter while wandering around the fictional town of Shadyside. At the time, Freckles wore short pants and long stockings. As Freckles aged, the strip introduced more jokes in family situations, eventually expanding into a continuity storyline about the teenage Freckles' day-to-day life with his friends.

The one-a-day gag strip evolved into adventure stories in the 1920s. In 1927, when readers were told to submit names for a horse, Blosser was overwhelmed with 24,000 responses. Freckles began wearing knickers in 1928. When Freckles and His Friends was dropped by a newspaper in 1929, the paper received thousands of phone calls, cards and letters, plus a petition from the employees of the newspaper, prompting a return of the strip to the comics page. In 1932, Freckles wore long trousers when he entered Shadyside High School and met his Friends. The Crumpet Hut crowd eventually included his best buddy Lard Smith, Bazoo Botts, Hilda, perky Daisy and the inventive intellectual Nutty Cook. Romance entered the strip after Freckles met June Wayman, a character introduced in 1937.

Walter Hoban and his strip Jerry on the Job were an influence on Blosser's simple cartoon style. An inspection of strips from different decades reveals that Blosser's artwork continually improved as the strips and characters evolved. After Henry Formhals became Blosser's assistant in 1935, a more realistic style surfaced as Freckles grew older and the strip became more narrative.

By 1939, Freckles was 17 years old, a high school senior and the captain of Shadyside High's football team. Most of his time was spent hanging out with his girlfriend June and his pal Lard, who was often in the company of his girlfriend, Hilda. Freckles' younger brother, Tagalong, aka Tag, also made appearances.

== Shadyside ==
Although Shadyside could have been located anywhere in the American heartland, it was obviously based on Blosser's hometown of Nappanee, Indiana, since Blosser often referenced real places in Nappanee, such as Johnson's Drug Store. Nappanee holds the distinction of having the longest city name in the United States containing each letter in its name twice, and six successful cartoonists lived in Nappanee as children, including Fred Neher (Life’s Like That) and Bill Holman (Smokey Stover).

In the 1940s, Freckles and His Friends carried a topper strip, Hector. By 1945, the strip was carried in 580 daily and 158 Sunday newspapers. At its peak, Freckles and His Friends was syndicated to more than 700 papers. It was adapted to the Big Little Book series and reprinted in comic books, including Dell Comics' Crackajack Funnies and the back pages of the Red Ryder comic book. Freckles had his own title from Standard Comics for eight issues in the late 1940s and then four issues published by Argo Comics in the mid-1950s.

Blosser married shortly after he drew the earliest Freckles and His Friends strips. For years, the couple lived in Cleveland, where the NEA office was located, until they moved to Los Angeles and then to the Los Angeles suburb of Arcadia. After his first few decades of doing the strip, Blosser shared the work of producing the daily and Sunday strips with his assistant Henry Formhals, who took over the daily in 1938. When Blosser retired, Formhals produced it alone from 1966 to 1971. The strip was discontinued on August 28, 1971.

== Awards ==
In September 1945, with the 30th anniversary of Freckles and His Friends, Blosser was the guest of honor in Los Angeles at a testimonial dinner attended by his personal friends, radio personalities, film stars and executives of the Los Angeles News. In New York in May, 1965, the National Cartoonists Society honored Blosser with an award "in recognition of the wholesome entertainment he has brought his myriad readers" and for the creation of "the oldest regular comic strip still piloted by its creator."

== See also ==
- Aggie Mack
- Carl Ed
- Etta Kett
- Harold Teen
- Marty Links
- Penny
- Teena
- Zits
