= Merrill Blosser =

American cartoonist (1892–1983)

- Born: May 28, 1892 Nappanee, Indiana, U.S.
- Died: January 9, 1983 (aged 90) Pasadena, California
- Area: Cartoonist
- Notable works: Freckles and His Friends

The young Merrill Blosser in Nappanee, Indiana.

Merrill Blosser (May 28, 1892 – January 9, 1983) was an American cartoonist, the creator of the comic strip Freckles and His Friends, which had a long run (1915–1971). Although his strip was set in the small town of Shadyside, it was obviously based on Blosser's hometown of Nappanee, Indiana, since Blosser often referenced real Nappanee locations, such as Johnson's Drug Store.

== Early life ==
Growing up in Nappanee, where he was born, Blosser was encouraged by his parents to take drawing lessons, and he signed up for Charles N. Landon's correspondence course. Six successful cartoonists lived in Nappanee as children, including Fred Neher (Life’s Like That) and Bill Holman (Smokey Stover). When Blosser was 12 years old, National Magazine held a writing competition, and he was a winner with his essay, "The Best Way to Spend $300." The prize was a trip to Washington, D.C.

Touring the city, the prizewinners were taken to the White House to meet President Theodore Roosevelt. Lagging behind, Blosser drew a sketch of Roosevelt which prompted the President to exclaim, "Bully!" He then kept Blosser with him for half a day, advising him to continue in the field of art. Expelled from high school after he displayed caricatures of the high school faculty, including a drawing of the school principal as Satan, Blosser described the suspension as "the best break I ever had."

== Education and early career ==
While attending Blue Ridge College in Union Bridge, Maryland, in 1911, Blosser sold drawings to the Frederick News in Frederick, Maryland. When he was 20, he quit school after selling a cartoon to the Baltimore American in 1912. Blosser studied at the Chicago Academy of Fine Arts. He did cartoons for Chicago's Motor-Cycling magazine and magazines at the Denton Publishing Company in Cleveland, and he also drew political cartoons for the Wheeling Register and The Plain Dealer.

== Freckles and His Friends ==
Merrill Blosser's Freckles and His Friends and Hector (December 21, 1947)

Landon was also an editor at Newspaper Enterprise Association, and in May 1915, he hired Blosser to work at NEA. Blosser was 23 when he began in the NEA art department, initially doing cartoons based on news events and then drawing five daily panels. One of these, titled Freckles, began as a one-column daily gag panel on August 16, expanding into a full comic strip on September 20 when it was retitled Freckles and His Friends. One by one, each of the other panels were dropped.

In July 1916, Blosser started another strip, Miniature Movies, which evolved into Chestnut Charlie, continuing until early in 1918 when Blosser concentrated exclusively on Freckles and His Friends.

== Life in Arcadia ==
Blosser married shortly after he drew the earliest Freckles and His Friends strips. For years, the couple lived in Cleveland, where the NEA office was located, until they moved in 1927 to Los Angeles. During the early 1940s, they lived at 751 Masselin Avenue before moving to the Los Angeles suburb of Arcadia. Asked about his activities away from his drawing table, Blosser responded that he "travels, swims, and lives a simple life." A 1945 syndicated newspaper profile of Blosser described his life in Arcadia during the 1940s:

Blosser had a beautiful home built to his own ideas. He has his own studio there and does all his work at home. He likes to raise flowers and vegetables, but he doesn't like to mow lawns, so he planted his front yard in variegated ivy instead of grass. It worked out fine. He is youthful, friendly and enthusiastic. He likes the outdoors, loves football games, long automobile rides and kids. He admires good art work and is a collector of fine paintings.

Blosser, who said he aimed for "simply good humor," was influenced by cartoonist Walter Hoban (Jerry on the Job). After his first few decades of doing the strip, Blosser shared the work with Henry Formhals, who began as Blosser's assistant in 1935. Eventually, Blosser drew the Sunday strips, while Formhals, beginning in 1938, drew the daily strips. The last daily strip signed by Blosser was on February 12, 1966. Daily strips between February 14 and March 19 have Formhals' signature covered with opaque white. The March 21, 1966, daily strip is the first to carry Formhals' signature.

== Awards ==
Although the characters in the strip never joined up with the military during World War II, Blosser's use of the strip to promote the sale of War Bonds brought him a personal citation from Secretary of the Treasury Henry Morgenthau Jr.

In New York in May, 1965, the National Cartoonists Society held a testimonial dinner honoring Blosser. The NCS gave him an award "in recognition of the wholesome entertainment he has brought his myriad readers" and for the creation of "the oldest regular comic strip still piloted by its creator."

The following year, Blosser retired, and Formhals then worked alone on Freckles and His Friends from 1966 to 1971. The strip was discontinued on August 28, 1971. For most of his life, Blosser lived in Arcadia and Pasadena, California, where he died in 1983.
