= Al Posen =

American cartoonist (1894–1960)

- Born: Alvah Posen; October 2, 1894; New York City, New York
- Died: June 10, 1960 (aged 65)
- Occupation: Cartoonist
- Known for: Sweeney & Son

Al Posen's Sweeney & Son (May 8, 1955)

Alvah Posen (October 2, 1894 - June 10, 1960) was an American cartoonist on several comic strips, but he is best known for his 1933-1960 comic strip Sweeney & Son and as co-producer of the now-lost Marx Brothers film, Humor Risk (1921).

== Early life ==
Born in New York City, Posen served in the Army during World War I and worked for a film advertising agency when the war ended. He then travelled in the Orient as a member of a geological and mining expedition, spending a year in Siam and Yunan.

== Comic strips ==
Al Posen's Sweeney & Son (March 18, 1951)

In 1922, with no formal training in art, Posen created the rhyming daily comic strip, Them Days Are Gone Forever (aka Them Days Is Gone Forever). Distributed by United Features Syndicate, it was published in 1000 newspapers within a year, and continued until April 4, 1925. On April 19, 1926, Posen began another daily strip called Jinglet, which used several rhymed words in a four-panel gag. (For example: "Pals / Gals / Luck / Stuck".) This ran until March 19, 1927.

Posen followed it with another rhyming Sunday strip, the short-lived Ella and Her Fella, from May 21 to September 30, 1933. This also featured a revival of Jinglet as the topper.

Sweeney & Son debuted as a Sunday page on October 1, 1933, replacing Ella and Her Fella. Sweeney & Son continued for more than 25 years, until August 21, 1960. Jinglet continued to be the topper strip from 1933 to 1950.

In 1949, Posen created a new daily strip, Rhymin' Time, which ran from January 17, 1949 to 1950. Rhymin' Time was a four-panel strip with lyrics set to "Turkey in the Straw'", such as:

My business is conducting polls
And, gosh, is my face red!
Since last election, everyone
Hurls insults at my head!
They used to think me wonderful.
"Infallible," they said.
Them Days Are Gone Forever.

From 1950 to 1953, the daily strip Rhymin' Time became the Sunday topper for Sweeney & Son, displacing Jinglet. Jinglet returned in 1953, and ran as the Sunday topper for the rest of the run, ending in 1960.

Posen also adapted his rhyming formats into comic strip advertisements for Bristol-Myers and companies.

As a National Cartoonists Society member, he originated the idea of cartoonist shows for American servicemen and became the NCS Director of Overseas Shows. Posen, Gus Edson, Bob Montana and other cartoonists participated in a USO cartoonists tour in October 1952. Posen was friends with Smokey Stover cartoonist Bill Holman, and the famed nonsense phrase "1506 nix nix" seen in Smokey Stover was an inside joke between the two cartoonists. The number 1506 was a reference to a hotel room where Posen stayed.

Posen was a bachelor who liked to ski at Lake Placid, New York, and vacation at a ranch in Wyoming.

== Awards ==
Posen received the National Cartoonists Society's Silver T-Square Award in 1956.
