= LGBTQ history in Mexico =

The historical study of LGBTQ people in Mexico can be divided into three separate periods, coinciding with the three main periods of Mexican history: pre-Columbian, colonial, and post-independence, in spite of the fact that the rejection of LGBTQ identities forms a connecting thread that crosses the three periods.

The data on the pre-Columbian people and those of the period of colonization is scarce and obscure. Historians often described the indigenous customs that surprised them or that they disapproved of, but tended to take a position of accusation or apology, which makes it impossible to distinguish between reality and propaganda. In general, it seems that the Mexica were as homophobic as the Spanish, and that other Indigenous peoples tended to be much more tolerant, to the point of honoring Two-Spirit people as shamans.

The history of LGBTQ people in the colonial period and after independence is a small yet growing field. Important historical events include the 1658 executions of thirteen men accused of sodomy, and the 1901 Dance of the Forty-One.

The situation is changing in the 21st century, in part thanks to the discovery of the LGBTQ community as potential consumers—the so-called pink peso—and tourists. Laws have been created to combat discrimination (2003), and two federal entities, the Federal District and Coahuila, have legalized civil unions for same-sex couples (2007). On December 21, 2009, despite opposition from the Church, the Government of Mexico City approved same-sex marriage, with 39 votes in favor, 20 against and 5 abstaining. It was the first city in Latin America to do so. Later, this right was recognized nationwide. However, in 2007 Mexico was still one of the countries in which the most crimes are committed against the LGBTQ community, with a person being murdered in a homophobic crime every two days.

== Pre-Columbian era ==
The majority of information on the pre-Columbian peoples comes from the reports of the Spanish conquest. These accounts must be taken with caution, given that the accusation of sodomy was used to justify the conquest, along with other accusations real or invented, such as human sacrifice, cannibalism, or idolatry. Given that the defenders of the natives manipulated information as much as those who opposed them, some trying to minimise the incidence of sodomy and others exaggerating the stories, it is impossible to get an accurate picture of homosexual behavior in pre-Columbian Mexico. The historian Antonio de Herrera arrived at that conclusion as early as 1601.

Among the indigenous peoples of the Americas the institution of the two-spirit people was widespread. The two-spirits, originally considered hermaphrodites and called "berdache" by the Spanish conquistadors, were men who took feminine duties and behaviors. They were considered neither men nor women by their societies, but were considered like a third sex and often held spiritual functions. The conquistadors often thought of them as passive homosexuals, and they were treated with contempt and cruelty.

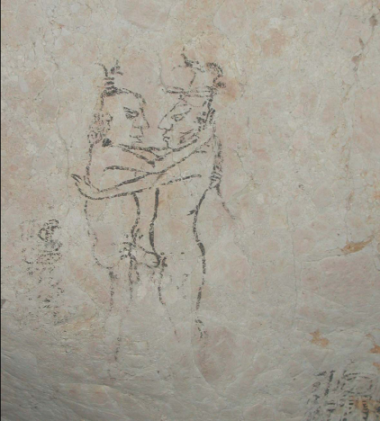
Homoerotic Mayan paint in the natural cave of Naj Tunich in Petén, Guatemala.

Among the Maya, there was a strong association between ritual and homosexual behavior. Some shamans engaged in homosexual acts with their patients, and priests engaged in ritualized homosexual acts with their gods. When the Toltecs arrived to conquer the region, they brought more same-sex activity and public sex of all kinds. Then when Itzá conquered the area, they brought more anal sex, more eroticism and extensive sexual ceremonies. However, the Maya, as a people with a hybrid culture, had differing views on homosexual sex. The Maya Chilam Balam books, for example, regularly contained sexual insults directed toward the Itzá. According to mythology contained in the book, homosexuals were responsible for destroying the order of Maya society by producing illegitimate children through their anuses who were unable to run society.

The Zapotecs of the Isthmus of Tehuantepec in southeastern Mexico did not develop a culture of conquest, which may explain their relaxed attitude toward masculinity. The Zapotecs embraced the concept of a third gender, which they referred to as muxe, as an intermediate between male and female who played both gender roles in everyday life. “Two-spirit” (and similar native terms) refer to gender, not sexual orientation or biological sex. “Two-spirit” individuals may be heterosexual, bisexual, or homosexual. To date, muxes still exist among Zapotec people and play a crucial role within the community.

=== The Mexica ===
Evidence from Monarquia Indiana by Juan de Torquemada suggests that same-sex sexual relationships between men and between women were not criminalised among the Mexica. Moreover, the Mexica had different worldviews than the Spanish authorities who compiled the sources presently available for study, making an understanding of pre-colonial Mexica gender and sexuality more difficult to understand since they were recorded through a Spanish-centric filter, and later texts from the early colonial-period like the Florentine Codex have been mistranslated by Dibble and Anderson due to the homophobic prejudices which were prevalent in the United States at that time.

Social attitudes towards homosexual men and women were negative and ranged from disgust to amusement because they were perceived as violating Mexica gender roles, though attitudes were less negative towards homosexual women rather than men. Homosexual men during the period of the Aztec Empire had methods of publicly identifying each other, which made them highly visible in Mexica society.

According to certain records, homosexual intercourse was performed in Mexica bathhouses.

Nonetheless, executions of male homosexuals are not attested during this period, and the existence of public identification methods by homosexual men makes it unlikely that they would have been persecuted. While male and female homosexuality were known and disapproved of in Mexica society, there is no evidence of any suppression of homosexuality among Mexicas, with all homophobic persecutions having been introduced after the Spanish conquest of the Aztec Empire after various forms of homosexuality acknowledged by the pre-colonial Mexica were redefined as "sodomy" and "sin" by Christian friars.

Homosexual men in Mexica society also had a religious role, with records suggesting that there was a connection between them and Titlacahuan, that is the trickster aspect of the god Tezcatlipoca. Titlacahuan himself was depicted carrying a flower signifying his eroticism and blowing on a phallic flute denoting penance and communication with the gods, and was associated with excessive sexual activity.

There were four terms in Classical Nahuatl which referred to homosexuality, and were defined by the sexual activities of their subjects rather than by psychological characteristics:

1. xōchihuah,
2. cuīlōni,
3. chimouhqui,
4. and patlācheh.

Additionally, the Mexica referred to effeminate men as cihuāyōlloh, meaning "one with a woman's heart," and to intersex people as cihuāoquichtli, meaning "woman-man."

==== xōchihuah ====
The Classical Nahuatl term was used to refer to a group of gender-variant people who wore women's clothing and performed women's tasks. This name was composed of the term xōchitl, meaning "flower," to which was added the suffix -huah, meaning "owner of," thus literally meaning "flower-bearer," due to the association of flowers with excess and sexual desire in Mexica culture.

The xōchihuah held an institutionalised, albeit degraded, role within Mexica society whereby they were kept as dependents of high-level nobles for whom they performed household chores, cleaned temples, and accompanied warriors in war and provided them with services including sexual ones.

The verb te-xōchihuia, made by using the prefix te-, denoting a human object of a verbal action, literally meant "to use flowers on someone" and was used metaphorically in the sense "to seduce someone."

==== cuīlōni ====
The term cuīlōni referred to a sub-category of xōchihuah who held the passive role during sexual intercourse. The name was derived from the term *cuīlō, itself the non-active stem of the verb te-cui, meaning "to sexually penetrate someone." Thus, cuīlōni meant "one who is sexually penetrated."

==== chimouhqui ====
The term chimouhqui was derived from a verb *chimohua or *chimohui, of uncertain meaning. This word was used to designate homosexual men.

==== patlācheh ====
The term patlācheh was used to refer to homosexual women, and the verb te-patlāchhuia was used to denote female homosexual intercourse.

== The conquest ==
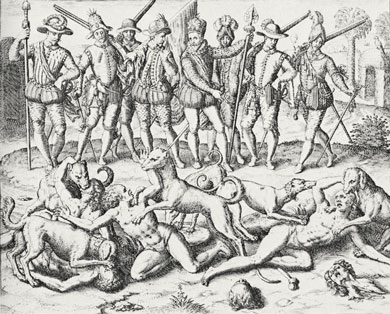
Engraving by Theodor de Bry that represents the scene in which Balboa sets his dogs on some two-spirits (1594); Public library of New York.

Since the first contacts of the Spanish with the indigenous people there was established the equivalence of Indian, cannibal, and sodomite. It was a doctor accompanying Columbus, Diego Alvarez Chanca, in a letter from 1494, who first gave news of that. He spoke of the Carib custom of capturing young men to those who removed all the masculine organs. These developed "feminine characteristics and the Caribbeans employed them for the practice of sodomy in a manner similar to that which the Arabs enjoy their young people like eunuchs and two-spirits. ... A time grown men, the Caribs kill them and eat them."

In 1511, Peter Martyr d'Anghiera published his De orbe novo decades, with the information that he was able to get about the first explorers thanks to his friendship with Isabella I of Castile. D'Anghiera told how Vasco Núñez de Balboa, during his exploration of Quarequa, in the Isthmus of Panama, in 1513, upset with "a brother of the king and other young men, obliging men, [who] dressed effeminately with women's clothing [... of those which the brother of the king] went too far with unnatural" temerity, threw forty of them as food to the dogs. D'Anghiera continues his story saying that the indigenous people's "natural hate for unnatural sin" drove them so that, "spontaneously and violently, they searched for all the rest that they would know who were infected". After all, D'Anghiera mentions that "only the nobles and the gentlemen practiced that kind of desire. [... The] indigenous people knew that sodomy gravely offended God. [... And that these acts provoked] the tempests that with thunder and lightning so frequently afflicted them, or the floods that drowned their fruits that had caused hunger and sickness."

In an account on the indigenous people realized in 1519 for the council of the town of Veracruz to report to Charles I, attributed to Hernán Cortés, it is mentioned that they had "managed to know for certain that they are all sodomites and practice that abominable sin". In another account from an anonymous Italian conquistador, it is said that the men and women of Pánuco worship a masculine member and have erect phalluses in their temples and public plazas to worship them: "the multitude of methods used by the men to satisfy their abominable vice [is] almost too unbelievable to be sure. [...] the devil contained in their idols has possessed them. It has given them instructions to sacrifice their fellow men, to extract their hearts and to offer the hearts, as well as the blood taken from the tongue, the ears, the legs and the arms, all to the idols". Finally, he comments that "all the inhabitants of New Spain and those of other adjacent provinces ate human flesh, all commonly practiced sodomy and drank to excess", comparing some of the customs of the indigenous people with those of the ungodly saracens.

In the middle of the 16th century the conquistador Bernal Díaz del Castillo and the soldier Juan de Grijalva write about scenes of sodomy carved into the architecture, in gold jewelry, in terracota and in statues. The West Indies explorer and gold smelting manager Gonzalo Fernández de Oviedo y Valdés included specifics in his 1526 La Natural hystoria de las Indias (his Sumario), expanded in his Historia general y natural de las Indias (1535, further expanded in 1851 from his previously unpublished papers). Around the same time, Núñez Cabeza de Vaca writes:

diabolical practices [...] a man married to another man, amarionados or effeminate, impotent men that dressed like women and performed women's duties, nevertheless, they fired the bow and the arrow and could carry heavy loads on their persons. We saw many amarionados, although taller and sturdier than the other men. Many of these men practiced the sin against nature.

— Núñez Cabeza de Vaca

Isabella of Portugal, wife of Charles V, possibly driven by these accounts, banned in 1529 the planting or use of maguey for the fermentation of pulque. The queen thought that it caused "drunkenness and drove the Indians to carry out" human sacrifices and unspeakable sin.

These and other accounts were converted into an authentic literary genre, circulated to the whole Peninsula, and were used to justify the idea of Empire; it was another "just cause" for the domination and occupation of the West Indies. Francisco de Vitoria, despite knowing that the indigenous people were right and that as such the emperor did not have law over them, thought that "the heathens that committed sins against nature, such as idolatry, pederasty or fornication, all those offenses to God, could have been stopped by force". Among those sins against nature was naturally sodomy, the sin against nature par excellence. The legislation was based on the different culture and its customs, among the most notable: cannibalism, human sacrifice, and sodomy, in this case the conquest of Mexico could have represented simply an extension of the Spanish reconquest of the infidels, represented then by the Moors. Thus the circle was closed with the relationship of Moor, sodomite, Indian.

== Viceroyalty of New Spain ==
The Spaniards were shocked to observe homosexual behavior elsewhere in the New World. They had encountered a cultural tradition unknown to Europe but common to many indigenous tribes in North and South America: publicly recognized gender role reversal. As described by Gonzalo Fernández de Oviedo y Valdés on his 1526 "Natural History of the Indies":

"Very common among the indians in many parts is the nefarious sin against the nature, even in public the indians are headmen [...] have youths with whom they use this accursed sin, and those consenting youths as soon as they fall into this guilt wear naguas (skirts) like women [...] and they wear strings of beads and bracelets and the other things used by women as adornment; and they do not exercise in the use of weapons, nor do anything proper to men, but they occupy themselves in the usual chores of the house such as to sweep and wash and other things customary for women."

— Fernandez de Oviedo.

As conquerors, the Spanish sought to justify the subordination of native peoples. When they encountered cultures that sanctioned male-male sexual relations, they immediately labeled such behavior "sodomy," after the biblical city of Sodom, which was said to have been destroyed by God for the sinful behavior of its inhabitants. That the biblical sin in question was the failure to show hospitality to strangers was irrelevant in the light of subsequent ecclesiastical interpretation, which ascribed it to homosexuality. Thus homosexual behavior among many of the native peoples became one of several theological justifications for the destruction of their culture, subjugation of their societies, and conversion to Roman Catholicism.

As of the middle of the 16th century, there appeared the first historians who really lived and worked in New Spain. Friar Toribio de Benavente, later called Motolínia, one of the most important historians of this era, writes that the indigenous people "drank a certain wine called pulque, to the point of drunkenness, followed by sacrifices and vices of the flesh, especially [...] the unspeakable sin". Again all the indigenous people are demonized as crazy drunks. Worst were the official historians, like Francisco López de Gómara, who filled America with fantastic beings despite never having set foot on American soil, or Juan Ginés de Sepúlveda, who thought that the indigenous people had been predetermined by nature for servitude. Also, Friar Bernardino de Sahagún dedicated the chapter "Of the depraved people such as ruffians and sodomites" of his General history of the things of New Spain (1558–1565) to the subject. Bernal Díaz del Castillo also write about sodomy as of 1568. Again, he connects the Indian religions and their priests with cannibalism, human sacrifice, and sodomy. In 1569 Tomás López Mendel also blames the indigenous priests for spreading sodomy among the people.

In reaction to these writings, as of 1542, Bartolomé de las Casas, along with other indigenous and missionary writers, launched a literary counteroffensive. De las Casas considered the "beastly vice of sodomy as the worst, the most detestable of any human wickedness". He denied with passion the reports passed on by the conquistadors and explorers, who had "defamed the Indians, having accused them of being infected with sodomy, a great and wicked falsehood" and thought that they observed "abstinence towards the sensual, vile and dirty affections", although he admitted that in a country so big there could be isolated cases of particular people in particular cases, attributed to "a natural corruption, depravity, a kind of innate sickness or fear of witchcraft and other magic spells", but in no case among the converts to Christianity. De las Casas gives for example the mixe who cruelly set fire to the sodomites discovered in the temple. According to the statements of Friar Augustín de Vetancurt, those men who dressed as women (and vice versa) were hanged if they committed unspeakable sin and the priests were burned, a report that Friar Gerónimo de Mendieta confirms. Friar Gregorio García, in his Origin of the Indians of the new world (sic, 1607), assured that before the arrival of the Spanish "the men of New Spain committed huge sins, especially those against nature, although repeatedly they burned for those and were consumed in the fire sent from the heavens [... the indigenous people] punished the sodomites with death, executed them with great vigor. [...] They strangled or drowned the women who lay with other women since those also considered it against nature". Garcia attributed the cases of sodomy to the fact that the "miserable Indians act like that because the Devil has tricked them, making them believe that the gods they worship also practice sodomy and therefore they consider it a good and lawful custom".

Nevertheless, De las Casas could not stop giving news about homosexual acts in contemporary Indian societies, as the custom of the fathers buying young boys for their children "to be used for the pleasure of sodomy", the existence of "infamous public places known as efebías where lewd and shameless young men practiced the abominable sin with all those who came into the house" or the two-spirits, "impotent, effeminate men dressed as women and carrying out their work". Also Friar Gregoria García gave news of that kind, such as "some men dressed as women and some father had five sons [... the younger] dressed him as a woman, and instructed him in his work and married him as a girl, although even in New Spain they scorned the effeminate and womanly Indians". The mentions of sodomy continued for a long time, even in 1666, in Cristóbal de Agüero and in 1697, in Friar Ángel Serra.

Indigenous writers did not delay in joining De las Casas to defend American culture. Fernando de Alva Cortés Ixtlilxochitl, governor of Texcoco, wrote in 1605 that among the Chichimecs, the one who "assumed the function of the woman had his internal parts extracted by the backside while he stayed tied up to a stake, after which some boys poured ashes on the body until it was buried under them [...] they covered all the pile with many pieces of firewood and set it on fire. [... also] covered that which had functioned as man with ashes while he was alive, until he died". Alva Ixtlilxochitl's account is, according to Crompton, too detailed to be invented, but according to Garza the story shows clear signs of Mediterranean influence in the fact of the differentiation between active and passive homosexuals.

The colonial administration imposed the Spanish laws and customs on the indigenous peoples, which, in the case of sodomy, was facilitated by the existence of similar laws in the Aztec Empire. During the Spanish Golden Age, the crime of sodomy was handled and punished in equivalent manner to that of treason or heresy, the two most serious crimes against the State. Initially the Inquisition was controlled by the local bishops, such as the archbishop Juan de Zumárraga (1536–1543), of whom a study of the cases judged shows that homosexuality was one of the main preoccupations of the court. The punishments for sexual sins tended to be fines, penance, public humiliation, and lashing in the most serious cases. In 1569 Felipe II officially creates the tribunal of Mexico City, but in the Viceroyalty of New Spain only civil law took charge of judging the unspeakable sin.

In 1569, official inquisitorial tribunals had been created in Mexico City by Philip II. Homosexuality was a prime concern of the [episcopal] Inquisition, which inflicted stiff fines, spiritual penances, public humiliations, and floggings for sexual sins. In 1662, the Mexican Inquisition complained that homosexuality was common, especially among the clergy, and asked for jurisdiction on the grounds that the secular courts were not sufficiently vigilant. The request was denied. In fact, the civil authorities, under the 8th Duke of Albuquerque, had recently been extremely active, indicting a hundred men for sodomy and executing a substantial number. People accused of homosexuality were publicly executed by mass burnings in San Lázaro, Mexico City.

The first known burning of sodomites in Mexico was in 1530, when they burned on the Caltzontzin pyre for idolatry, sacrifice, and sodomy. Pedro Cieza de León also tells that Juan of Olmos, principal judge of Puerto Viejo, had burned "great quantities of those depraved and demonic Indians". In 1596, the viceroy Gaspar de Zúñiga, Count of Monterrey reported, in a letter sent to Philip II to justify the increase of the salary of the royal officials, that those had seized and burned some delinquents for the unspeakable sin and other types of sodomy, although he does not give the number of victims or the circumstances of the event.

In 1658 the Viceroy of New Spain, the Duke of Albuquerque, wrote to Charles II about a case of unspeakable sin in Mexico City in which he had "nineteen prisoners, fourteen of which [were] sentenced to burn". Lucas Matheo, a young man of 15 years, was saved from the bonfire thanks to his youth, but suffered 200 lashes and six years of forced labor by cannon. Among the documents sent to the king was a letter from the judge of the Supreme Court of His Majesty, Juan Manuel Sotomayor, who described sodomy as an "endemic cancer" that had "infested and spread among the captive prisoners of the Inquisition in their individual cells and the ecclesiastical officials have also begun their own investigations". The letter from Sotomayor reported that between 1657 and 1658 they had investigated and sentenced 125 individuals, whose names, ethnicities, and occupations he listed next. The Viceroy as much as the Magistrate based his rejection of sodomy on both traditional Catholic Biblical teachings and sui generis stories. Sotomayor wrote "as some saints have professed, that all the sodomites have died with the birth of Our Lord Jesus".

The previous case allows us to catch a glimpse of the subculture of homosexuals in Mexico City in the first half of the 17th century, since many of the accused were more than 60 years old and took that life for more than twenty. All those involved came from the lower classes: blacks, indigenous people, mulattos, and deformed Europeans. There are signs that the wealthier classes were also implicated, but were not deemed affected thanks to their influence. Many of the accused had nicknames, like Juan de la Vega, who was called "la Cotita", Juan de Correa, "la Estanpa", or Miguel Gerónimo, "la Cangarriana", the nickname of a prostitute from the city who was known for her promiscuity. The group met periodically in private houses, often on the days of religious festivities with the excuse of praying and giving tribute to the Virgin and the saints, but in reality they had cross-dressing dances and orgies. The next meeting places and dates were mentioned in the previous parties or were disseminated by mail and messengers who belonged to the group.

In 1759 Mariano Aguilera, an intersex person, living in the town of Ayotla petitioned a priest named Joseph Moreno Justi to declare him a man. He was dressed as and presented as a female for the earlier part of his life, adopting male dress a year before his petition. While among family and the townsfolk he was referred to as a woman, but he identified as male. He asked that the priest review his case and declare him a man so that he could be able to marry Lopez. One of Aguilera’s arguments rested on his sexual relations with Lopez, asking that he be allowed to marry her "to repair the damage done to her virginity."

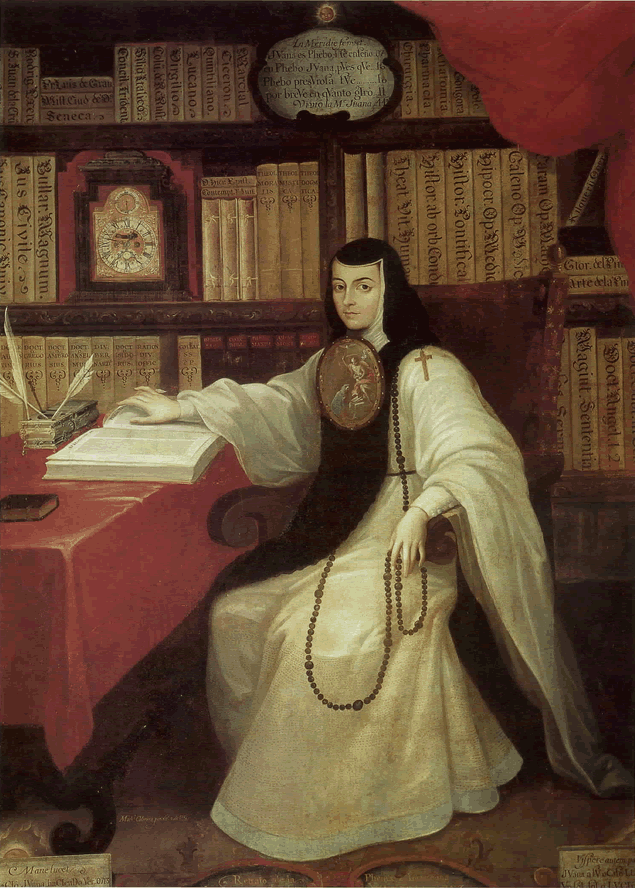
Sor Juana Inés de la Cruz was an icon for modern lesbian culture.

Colonial culture was similar to that of Spain and had prominent intellectuals among those born in America. Perhaps one of the most important was Sor Juana Inés de la Cruz, whom some scholars have claimed was a lesbian, based on the intense friendships that she had with various women, the beauty of whom she praises in her poetry.

== Independent Mexico ==
Mexican independence from Spain in 1821 brought an end to the Inquisition and the colonial homosexual oppression. The intellectual influence of the French Revolution and the brief French occupation of Mexico (1862–1867) resulted in the adoption of the Napoleonic Penal Code. This meant that sexual conduct in private between adults, whatever their gender, ceased to be a criminal matter. In matters concerning homosexuality, the Mexican government held that law should not invade the terrain of the individual moral conscience, in order to protect the precious concerns of sexual freedom and security; and that the law should limit itself "to the minimum ethics indispensable to maintaining society." It did not grant people the right to be overtly homosexual; for included in the "minimum ethics indispensable to maintaining society" are laws against solicitation and any public behavior which is considered socially deviant or contrary to the folkways and customs of the time. Public homosexual behavior being one of them.

In 1863 French troops took Mexico City and established Maximilian I as Emperor of Mexico. Fernando Bruquetas de Castro, in his book "Kings who loved like queens", states that Maximilian I was gay. It seems that the rumors of his homosexuality began in the court of Brussels, where his wife, the princess Carlota Amalia, came from. The conclusive breakup between Maximilian and Carlota was during a stopover in Madeira, where the future emperor made a famous escape for the homosexual underworld of the island. In Mexico, Carlota became pregnant, possibly by the baron Alfred Van der Smissen, who formed part of the queen's guard, while the emperor was surrounded by his male friends, like the prince Félix Salm-Salm or the colonel López, who were loyal to the end.

The French invasion introduced the Napoleonic Code in Mexico. The code does not mention sodomy, for it had ceased to be a crime. Nevertheless, in 1871 the new Penal Code introduced "attack on morality and proper customs", a relatively vague concept whose interpretation was left to the police and the judges, and which was used against homosexuals. Thus, in the late 19th century a homosexual subculture had already formed in Mexico City, similar to that existing in other large American cities such as Buenos Aires, Rio de Janeiro, Havana, New York City, and Toronto. The work of historians like Victor M . Macías-González, Pablo Picatto, and Robert Buffington, among others, has identified areas such as gay bathhouses, prisons, and some squares and avenues of the capital. The work of criminologist Roumagnac, for example, gives details of homosexual practices in the country's prisons.

In the spring of 1918, Manuel Palafox, secretary general of Emiliano Zapata, was accused by political enemies within the Zapatista camp of having leaked information through his homosexual relationships. Put under the watch of Gildardo Magaña, he escaped and sought to bring together the Zapatista leaders around him, in which he failed. Palafox died in 1959 without revealing his homosexuality.

In the 1930s there already existed some bars and baths for homosexuals in Mexico City, in the areas around Alameda, Zócalo, Paseo de Reforma and Calle Madero. In the next decade, during World War II, the city had ten to fifteen bars, and dancing was permitted in El África and El Triumfo. This relative permissiveness ended in 1959, when the mayor Uruchurtu closed all the city's gay bars after a triple crime.

== Dance of the forty-one ==
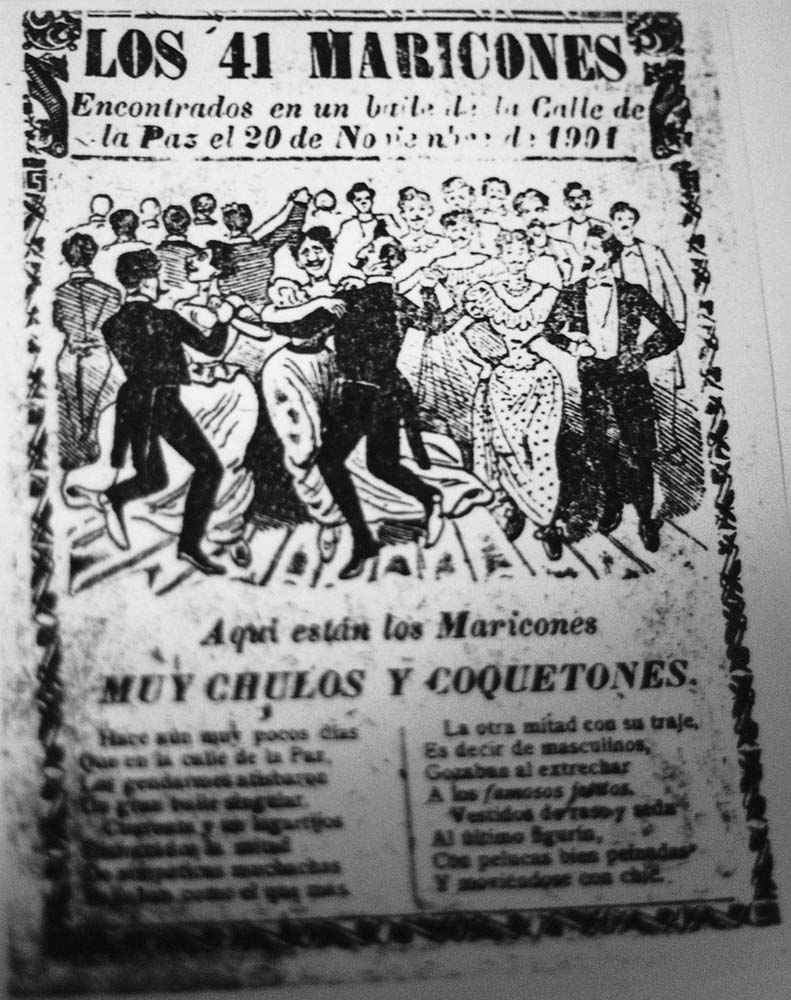
Publication of newspaper Hoja Suelta in 1901. Illustration by famous Mexican artist José Guadalupe Posada, representing the Dance of the 41 Maricones.

On the night of 20 November 1901, Mexico City police raided an affluent drag ball, arresting 42 men, half of them dressed as women, and dragging them off to Belón Prison. The resulting scandal, known as the Dance of the 41 Maricones, received massive press coverage and prompted a series of widely circulated prints by José Guadalupe Posada that depicted the dance. The cross-dressers were publicly humiliated, forced to sweep the streets under police guard, inducted into the 24th Battalion of the Mexican Army and sent to the southeastern state of Yucatán, where the Caste War was still being fought. Rumors that then-President Porfirio Díaz's nephew, Ignacio de la Torre, had attended the dance but was permitted to escape further added to the scandal's notoriety. Although the official account was that she was a "real woman." Historians, including well-known cultural commentator Carlos Monsiváis, argue that male homosexuality in the modern sense was "invented" in Mexico when the 1901 raid occurred. Since that time, the number 41 has come to symbolize male homosexuality in Mexican popular culture, figuring frequently in jokes and in casual teasing. Although the raid on the Dance of the 41 was followed by a less-publicized raid of a lesbian bar on 4 December 1901 in Santa Maria, the regime was soon worried by more serious threats such as the political and civil unrest that eventually led to the Mexican Revolution in 1910.

== Society in the twentieth century ==
Despite the international depression of the 1930s and along with the social revolution overseen by President Lázaro Cárdenas (1934–40), the growth of Mexico City was accompanied by the opening of gay bars and gay bathhouses supplementing the traditional cruising locales of the Alameda, the Zócalo, Paseo de la Reforma, and Calle Madero (formerly Plateros). Those involved in homosexual activity continued to live with their families, and there were no homophobic publications.

The lower classes of Mexican society tend to preserve the Mediterranean model, in which homosexuals are divided into active and passive, the active ones being "masculine" and the passive ones being "effeminate" and "contemptible": "I'm a man; if I fuck you, you're not a man". There exists fear among active homosexuals of being penetrated, because they fear the possibility that they will like it and cease to be "men". For their part, the homosexuals of the higher, more cosmopolitan classes took the European model of the dandy in the late 19th century. This model is being replaced by another more similar to the Anglo-Saxon one, in which the homosexual is not defined by the active/passive dichotomy, but by the fact that he has sexual relations with other men. Those who refuse to define themselves as active or passive are called "internationals".

During the Second World War, ten to fifteen gay bars operated in Mexico City, with dancing permitted in at least two, El África and El Triunfo. Relative freedom from official harassment continued until 1959 when Mayor Ernesto Uruchurtu closed every gay bar following a grisly triple murder. Motivated by moralistic pressure to "clean up vice," or at least to keep it invisible from the top, and by the lucrativeness of bribes from patrons threatened with arrests and from establishments seeking to operate in comparative safety, Mexico City's policemen had a reputation for zeal in persecution of homosexuals. By the late 1960s several Mexican cities had gay bars and, later, U.S.-style dance clubs. These places, however, were sometimes clandestine but tolerated by local authorities often meant that they were allowed to exist so long as the owners paid bribes. A fairly visible presence was developed in large cities such as Guadalajara, Acapulco, Veracruz and Mexico City.

Among many Mexican homosexuals there exists the so-called "phallic dream", which consists of seeing the U.S. as a sexual utopia, in which they can be free and openly gay. Acting accordingly, they try to make contact with foreign tourists as a springboard to the dream destination. However, many end up disillusioned in the dream destination when they have to face up to prevailing homophobia and racism.

The Mexican artist Frida Kahlo for example openly engaged in relationships with both men and women. She sometimes expressed her sexual identity through her clothing by wearing masculine attire and documented it in her self-portraits.

== LGBTQ movement ==
Until the late 1960s, there were neither LGBTQ groups nor publications on the topic. The first LGBTQ groups were formed in the early 1970s in Mexico City and Guadalajara. On August 15, 1971, the Homosexual Liberation Front was formed, the first of its kind in Mexico. It was dissolved a year later.

One of the first LGBTQ activists was Nancy Cárdenas. Cárdenas, writer, actress, and theater director, inspired by the LGBTQ movements in Europe and the United States, began to direct gatherings of LGBTQ writers. In 1973 she was the first Mexican to openly discuss her homosexuality on Mexican television. In 1974 she cofounded the Homosexual Liberation Front (FLH). On July 26, 1978, the first LGBTQ march took place, in favor of the Cuban Revolution. The march was organized by the Homosexual Front for Revolutionary Action (FHAR). On October 2 of the same year, the groups FLH, Lesbos, Oikabeth, Lambda Group of Homosexual Liberation, and Sex-Pol, among others, marched in the demonstration to commemorate the tenth anniversary of the movement of 1968. In 1979, FHAR took to the streets again in favor of the Nicaraguan Revolution. As can be appreciated, the LGBTQ movement was very connected to leftist movements in the beginning. In late June 1979, the first demonstration in favor of homosexual rights took place, coinciding with the anniversary of the Stonewall riots. Demonstrators demanded freedom of sexual expression, and protested social and police repression. Since then, an LGBTQ march is celebrated annually on June 28. But these groups and others have not had the necessary continuity.

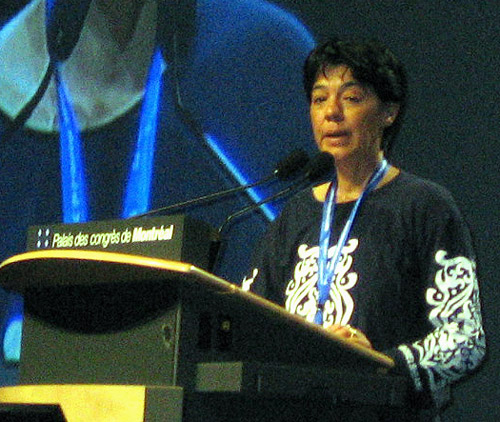
Patria Jiménez, on 28 July 2006 in Montreal

The LGBTQ movement found itself paradoxically driven by the AIDS crisis, which is believed to have reached Mexico in 1981. LGBTQ groups were focused more on the fight against the infection, carrying out prevention and safe sex campaigns with information on the disease, but also led their fight against the social prejudices of the more conservative sectors, which considered AIDS a divine punishment. The demonstrations, which had become annual, asked for the end of social discrimination against AIDS patients, especially in employment, hospitals and health centers, and prevention measures, such as the promotion of condom use.

In the 1990s, without ceasing to fight for the aforementioned issues, activists began to protest the murders of homosexuals, and to defend respect for sexual diversity. In 1992, Patria Jiménez and Gloria Careaga-Perez created the lesbian organization El clóset de Sor Juana (Sister Juana's closet), one of the country's most important LGBTQ organizations. It was accredited as an NGO by the United Nations for the Fourth World Conference on Women.

== LGBTQ people in politics ==
In 1997, Patria Jiménez was the first openly gay person to win a position in Congress, doing so for the Party of the Democratic Revolution. In 2007, Amaranta Gómez Regalado (for México Posible) was the first transgender person to appear in Congress. Amaranta Gómez is identified with the muxe, a name given locally to the two-spirits of Juchitán de Zaragoza (Oaxaca). In 2013 Benjamin Medrano was elected as the first openly gay mayor in Mexico's history upon his election as the mayor of the city of Fresnillo, Zacatecas.

== See also ==
- LGBT in Mexico
- LGBT rights in Mexico
- LGBT culture in Mexico
- Lesbian culture in Mexico City
- LGBTQ culture in Tijuana
- LGBT people in Mexico
