= Henry Formhals =

American cartoonist

- Born: August 2, 1908 Los Angeles, California, U.S.
- Died: May 12, 1981 (aged 72) Los Angeles, California, U.S.
- Area: Cartoonist
- Notable works: Freckles and His Friends

Henry Formhals' Joe Jinks, opening panel from the 11-panel Sunday strip of January 4, 1953

Henry Martin Formhals (August 2, 1908 – May 12, 1981) was an American cartoonist best known for his work on the comic strip Freckles and His Friends.

== Biography ==
Born in Los Angeles, Formhals was a carrier for the Pasadena Star-News, and he graduated from Pasadena High School. He studied art at the Stickney Art School in Los Angeles and was employed for several years as a commercial artist before he began working on comic strips.

Formhals was an assistant on Merrill Blosser's Freckles and His Friends beginning in 1935. In 1932, Freckles wore long trousers when he entered Shadyside High School and met his Friends. The Crumpet Hut crowd eventually included his best buddy Lard Smith, Bazoo Botts, Hilda, perky Daisy and the inventive intellectual Nutty Cook. Romance entered the strip after Freckles met June Wayman, a character introduced in 1937. An inspection of strips from different decades reveals that Blosser's artwork continually improved as the strips and characters evolved. After Henry Formhals became Blosser's assistant in 1935, a more realistic style surfaced as Freckles grew older and the strip became more narrative. Eventually, Blosser drew the Sunday strips and Formhals, beginning in 1938, took over the daily strips.

By 1939, Freckles was 17 years old, a high school senior and the captain of Shadyside High's football team. Most of his time was spent hanging out with his girlfriend June and his pal Lard, who was often in the company of his girlfriend, Hilda. Freckles' younger brother, Tagalong, aka Tag, also made appearances.

During World War II, Formhals was a zone air raid warden in Altadena, and he drew Civilian Defense information into the Sunday strips. His poster for the Altadena Hospitality House, posted all over Southern California, invited servicemen to drop in when they were in that area.

In 1966, Blosser retired, and Formhals then worked alone on Freckles and His Friends from 1966 to 1971. The last daily signed by Blosser was on February 12, 1966. Daily strips between February 14 and March 19 have Formhals' signature covered with opaque white. The March 21, 1966, daily strip is the first to carry Formhals' signature. He continued to work on it until the end of its run on August 28. 1971.

Formhals also worked on the Joe Jinks comic strip (1946-1953), and he assisted Charlie Plumb on Ella Cinders.

He died in Los Angeles in 1981.

== Archives ==
Formhals' strips are on file at the Specials Collections Library at Syracuse University. The collection contains 446 original Freckles and His Friends daily strips (1966–1967) and 75 original Sunday strips (1967–1968).
