= Smokey Stover =

American comic strip created by Bill Holman

- Author: Bill Holman
- Current status/schedule: Concluded
- Launch date: March 10, 1935
- End date: 1972
- Syndicate(s): New York News-Chicago Tribune Syndicate
- Publisher(s): Whitman, Blackthorne Publishing, Fantagraphics
- Genre: Humor

Smokey Stover is an American comic strip written and drawn by cartoonist Bill Holman from March 10, 1935, until he retired in 1972 and distributed through the Chicago Tribune. It features the misadventures of the titular fireman.

== Background ==
Holman was born in Crawfordsville, Indiana, and moved to Chicago, where he studied at the Academy of Fine Arts while working as an office boy in the Chicago Tribune art department. He relocated to New York City where he worked as a staff artist at the New York Herald Tribune and submitted freelance cartoons to magazines, including Colliers, The Saturday Evening Post, Life, Judge, and Everybody's Weekly. He began Smokey Stover as a Sunday comic strip for the Chicago Tribune Syndicate on March 10, 1935. The daily comic strip began on November 14, 1938.

== Overview ==
=== Characters and story ===
The madcap situations in Holman's comic strip usually feature Smokey (short for "Smokestack") Stover, the "foolish foo (fire)fighter", often riding in his self-balancing, two-wheeled "Foomobile" (a single-axle fire engine which resembles a modern Segway with seats, or an independent sidecar), his wife Cookie, his son Earl, his boss Chief Cash U. Nutt, the Chief's wife Hazel Nutt and the firehouse Dalmatian mascot, Sparks. Smokey has an array of eccentric relatives who are also featured occasionally, with names like "Uncle Potbelly Stover", "Rusty Stover" and "Cousin Cole Stover".

Smokey wears bright red (or yellow) rubber boots and a firefighter's helmet (always worn back-to-front), which he sometimes ties to his nose with string, in lieu of a chinstrap. His trademark helmet also features a prominent hole in its hinged brim, which he occasionally uses as an ashtray for his lit cigar. Although most of the sequences in the strip (and the occasional comic book) center on Smokey's escapades with the Chief, the loose "plots" and situations are mainly a framework to display an endless parade of off-the-wall verbal and visual humor.

=== Puns and "wallnuts" ===
The panels of Smokey Stover regularly include sight gags, mishaps, absurd vehicles, and bizarre household items, including oddly shaped furniture, clocks, vases, headwear, cigarette holders, and telephones. Framed pictures on the walls change completely from panel to panel or feature the subjects literally jumping out of the frames. The strip also abounds in nonsensical dialogue, non-sequiturs, and puns.

The puns and silly pictures on the wall was the feature that provoked the most reader mail, according to articles and interviews with Holman. The cartoonist often visited the syndicate office to pick up the puns which readers suggested for the walls. He called these items "wallnuts". For example, a picture of a fish opening a door is labeled "calling cod".

=== Use of language ===
1946 strip as reprinted in issue 64 of the Smokey Stover comic book.

The comic strip featured signs with strange nonsense words and phrases, such as "foo", "notary sojac", "scram gravy ain't wavey", and "1506 nix nix", and some became catchphrases. Holman defined "notary sojac" as Gaelic for "Merry Christmas" (Nodlaig Sodhach), and "1506 nix nix" was reportedly a private joke that included the hotel room number of cartoonist Al Posen, Holman's friend. His most frequent nonsense word was "foo", and Holman peppered his work with foo labels and puns. The term spread in popular culture during the 1930s and found use in 1938–39 Warner Brothers cartoons, most notably by director Bob Clampett, including Porky in Wackyland. Harvey Kurtzman claimed that the comic influenced him to use nonsense words and fill the corner panels of MAD Magazine with "nonsensical details".

Smokey "often called himself a foo fighter when anyone else would have said firefighter", according to comics historian Don Markstein. "The word foo also turned up on signs, lists, menus, and the lips of various characters at random but frequent intervals." Foo may have been inspired by the French word feu meaning "fire", as Smokey's catch phrase was "where there's foo, there's fire", but Holman never gave a straight answer as to the origin. Holman states that he used the word due to having seen it on the bottom of a jade Chinese figurine in Chinatown, San Francisco, meaning "good luck". This is presumably a transliteration of the fu character (fú, 福), which is a common character for fortune, and figurines are common in Chinese communities featuring the "star gods" Fú, Lù, Shòu.

== Related strips ==
=== Spooky ===
Holman launched an accompanying topper strip called Spooky one month later (April 7, 1935), to run with Smokey Stover on Sundays. With a perpetually bandaged tail, the peculiar black cat Spooky lives with her owner Fenwick Flooky, who does embroidery while characteristically wearing a fez and sitting barefoot in a rocking chair. Holman used the pseudonym "Scat H." to sign the strip. The topper ran until the strip ended in 1972.

=== Nuts and Jolts ===
Spooky, who makes frequent cameo appearances in Smokey Stover, also regularly turns up in the background of Holman's daily gag panel feature, Nuts and Jolts. Syndicated for more than three decades from July 8, 1935, to 1970, Nuts and Jolts was a stand-alone panel cartoon featuring an ever-changing cast of everyday people doing silly things.

== Comic books and reprints ==
There were several Smokey Stover comic books published by Dell Comics Four Color. The first in this series, No. 7 (1942), displayed an unusual front cover of a full seven-panel sequence, a rarity in comic book covers. The next in the Dell series, No. 35 (1944), was followed by No. 64 (February 1945), No. 229 (May 1949), No. 730 (October 1956) and No. 827 (August 1957). (Cartoonist Hy Eisman has said he drew the Smokey Stover content in Four Color No. 730.) In 1953–54, Holman produced two public services giveaway comic books on fire safety, both published by the National Fire Protection Association.

- Smokey Stover: Firefighter of Foo (1937) Whitman Publishing
- Smokey Stover and the Fire Chief of Foo (Penny Book, 1938) Whitman
- Smokey Stover: The Foo Fighter (Big Little Book #1421, 1938) Whitman
- Smokey Stover: The False Alarm Fireman (Better Little Book #1413, 1941) Whitman
- Smokey Stover: The Foolish Foo Fighter (Better Little Book #1481, 1945) Whitman
- Bill Holman's Smokey Stover: Book 1 (1985) Blackthorne Publishing (a trade paperback of black & white reprints with an introduction by Harvey Kurtzman)
- Screwball Comics: The First Nemo Annual (1985) Fantagraphics (an anthology of vintage comics also featuring Rube Goldberg, Milt Gross and Dr. Seuss)
- Smokey Stover and Spooky the Cat: The Collected Sundays (2012) Hermes Press ISBN 1-61345-011-7

== Animation ==
- In 1971, Smokey Stover was a featured segment on Filmation's Archie's TV Funnies, the only animated form of this comic. Smokey Stover became one of several rotating segments on the Saturday morning cartoon series. It was repeated in 1978, without Archie, under the title Fabulous Funnies.

== Legacy ==
During World War II, images of Smokey Stover and Spooky were painted as nose art on several American bomber aircraft. The term "foo fighter" was borrowed from Smokey Stover by a radar operator in the U.S. 415th Night Fighter Squadron, Donald J. Meiers. The term was used by Allied aircraft pilots in World War II to describe various unidentified flying objects or mysterious aerial phenomena seen in the skies over both the European and Pacific Theaters of Operations. Though "foo fighter" initially described a type of UFO reported and named by the 415th Squadron, the term was also commonly used to mean any UFO sighting from that period.

Foo Fighters is also the name of a rock band, first heard in 1995. Nirvana drummer Dave Grohl hoped to keep his anonymity and release recordings under the title "Foo Fighters", taken from the World War II term for UFOs and indirectly from Holman's strip.

== Merchandise, popular culture, and homages ==
- A novelty song based on Smokey Stover—"What This Country Needs Is Foo", with words and "FOOsic" by Mack Kay—was recorded by Eddie DeLange and His Orchestra on Bluebird Records in 1939. Holman illustrated the cover for the sheet music, released by Joe Davis, Inc. Music Publishers.
- In 1941, Bill Holman gave his blessing to The Order of Smokey Stover, a social club created by the Redmond Volunteer Firefighters Association in Redmond, Oregon.
- In 1953, Pittsfield, Massachusetts, firefighters William J. Knight and Walter J. Pictrowski designed and built a three-wheeled version of Smokey Stover's Foo Mobile. With permission and suggestions from Holman, the vehicle was adorned with familiar paraphernalia, such as a rubber-handled ax, a fire call box, a fire gong, crank handle and steam-generating radiator cap (a fire nozzle with the slogan "Sea-Oh-Too!"). The Foo Car has been in and out of service over the years and has been restored twice, brought back for appearances at Berkshire area parades, musters and charity events. It is currently garaged.
- Smokey Stover is referenced in "Jumbeliah", an unreleased song Bruce Springsteen wrote in his early career: "Built like Marilyn Monroe, and she walks just like Smokey Stover."
- In the 1980s, Gateway Scientific Inc. produced a line of smoke alarms marketed under the Smokey Stover brand name, with the packages featuring his likeness.
- Pete Schlatter of Francesville, Indiana constructed a workable single-axle, two-wheel Foomobile by hiding four support wheels inside the two wheels.
- In 2001, Dark Horse Comics issued a limited edition figure of Smokey Stover in a colorful collector tin, as part of their line of Classic Comic Characters—designated as statue No. 21.

== Sources ==
- Strickler, Dave. Syndicated Comic Strips and Artists, 1924–1995: The Complete Index. Cambria, California: Comics Access, 1995. ISBN 0-9700077-0-1
