= Life's Like That =

American comic strip by Fred Neher

- Fred Neher's Life's Like That
- Author(s): Fred Neher
- Current status/schedule: Concluded daily & Sunday
- Launch date: October 1, 1934
- End date: August 20, 1977
- Syndicate(s): Consolidated News Features (1934–1963); Bell-McClure Syndicate (1963-1972); United Feature Syndicate (1972-1977)
- Genre(s): gag panel

Life's Like That was a gag panel by Fred Neher which found humor in life's foibles. Spanning five decades -- from October 1, 1934 to August 20, 1977 — the panel was initially distributed by Consolidated News Features, and later by the Bell-McClure Syndicate and the United Feature Syndicate.

At its peak, Life's Like That was published in 500 newspapers. The Sunday format gave several cartoons a free-floating grouping, with variations, including one arrangement similar to George Lichty's Grin and Bear It, displaying several square-shaped panels with one in a circle.

When Neher died at age 98 in Boulder, Colorado in 2001, Owen S. Good wrote in the Rocky Mountain News:

He is survived by pot-bellied businessmen, henpecked husbands, worldly-wise goldfish and babies with thin curlicues of hair, all actors in the everyday comedies he staged on the funny pages.

== Publication history ==
Neher had drawn a comic strip, Goofey Movies, for five years (1925-1930), plus sales of gag cartoons to 42 magazines, including Collier's and The New Yorker, when the Bell Syndicate signed him on in 1934.

Life's Like That was launched October 1, 1934, and ran until 1941 but disappeared from newspapers during World War II. As the war concluded, it returned by June 1945, running until 1977, when Neher retired. He stopped doing the Sunday half-page in October 1972.

Doug Sweet, of The Montreal Gazette, recalled that his newspaper ran Life's Like That when it carried no other syndicated gag panels or comic strips:

Our comics have come a long way from December 15, 1937, when–to the best of our recollection–The Gazette began publishing its first regular cartoon. Life's Like That, drawn by Fred Neher (1903-2001), was a weekly, single-panel cartoon that sat at the bottom of the front page of the second section on Wednesdays. Soon after we added other strips, like Mickey Mouse. This newspaper was late getting into the comics business.

== Archives ==
Fred Neher's Life's Like That (October 6, 1968)

During the 1950s and 1960s, Neher taught cartooning at the University of Colorado for 12 years, and he donated his Life's Like That cartoons to the University of Colorado Library Archives (where they fill 36 linear feet). As he described it, "Univ. of Colo. ask to have all my original drawings for safe keeping ... came in a truck and left me only my shorts."
