= Baby Blues (American TV series) =

2000 American TV series or program

- Genre: Animated sitcom; Surreal humor
- Based on: Baby Blues by Rick Kirkman; Jerry Scott
- Developed by: Jeff Martin; Peter Ocko
- Voices of: Mike O'Malley; Julia Sweeney; E. G. Daily; Joel Murray; Kath Soucie; Arabella Field; Diedrich Bader; Nicole Sullivan
- Theme music composer: Steven Page
- Opening theme: "It's All Been Done" by Barenaked Ladies
- Composer: Ben Decter
- Country of origin: United States
- Original language: English
- No. of seasons: 2 (1 unaired)
- No. of episodes: 26 (13 unaired)

Production
- Executive producers: Jeff Martin; Pete Ocko
- Producers: Claudia Katz; Karen K. Miller
- Running time: 22 minutes
- Production companies: Split the Difference Productions; Warner Bros. Television

Original release
- Network: The WB (2000); Adult Swim (2002)
- Release: July 28, 2000 – March 10, 2002

Baby Blues is an American adult animated sitcom based on the comic strip of the same name by Rick Kirkman and Jerry Scott, and produced by Warner Bros. Television. The first eight episodes of Baby Blues originally aired in the United States on The WB between July 28 and August 24, 2000, before being canceled. The five remaining episodes from the first season eventually aired on Cartoon Network's nighttime programming block Adult Swim in 2002. A second season, consisting of 13 episodes, was produced but never aired.

The animated adaptation of Baby Blues differs from the comic by having it take place when Zoe was still an infant, even though she was the older sister to Hammie in the strip at the time. In addition, it focuses on Darryl and Wanda's relationship with supporting characters created for this series, including the Bittermans, a dysfunctional next-door family with three children; Bizzy, Zoe's babysitter; and Kenny, Darryl's laid-back close friend and co-worker.

== Characters ==
=== Main ===
From left to right: Melinda, Carl, Megan, Charlie the dog, Darryl, Wanda, Zoe, Rodney, Kenny, Shelby, and Bizzy.

- Darryl MacPherson (Mike O'Malley) is the uptight and responsible father of Zoe and husband to Wanda. He tends to think Wanda's heart-felt ideas are crazy, but later agrees with them if there is an advantage for himself. He wants the best for his baby daughter, but can overly protect her. Despite intending to do the right thing, he has done unexpected selfish things, such as pretending to grieve over going with Carl and their kids to a fun zone, only to watch an attractive dancer at the place singing every time it was a child's birthday. But in the end, he is faithful to his wife and daughter. Darryl often feels that his wife nags him, and often discusses his issues to his friend, Kenny at work. Most commonly, he talks about a problem, and the next day he talks about how happy he is to have solved the problem an easy way, then the next day he talks about how it did not work out. Darryl is quick to express jealousy—particularly of Carl, his next door neighbor.
- Wanda MacPherson (Julia Sweeney) is Darryl's wife and Zoe's mother. She is caring, unpredictable, passionate, and impulsive by turns. However, just as Darryl does, she loves Zoe and wants only the best for her. Wanda is a stay at home mom. Her closest friends are her neighbor Melinda and a teenage girl named Bizzy, who serves as Zoe's babysitter from time to time. Wanda generally has a cheerful disposition, but she is quick to let her emotions get the best of her. She usually goes through drastic measures to fix something, against her husband's wishes. Wanda is occasionally melancholy about motherhood, as suggested by the title Baby Blues. She is said to have a "crazy spark" in her that never left. This is seen at one point, when she wants to feel young again and escapes with Bizzy and her friends at night and gets caught by the police. Wanda's unpredictable and impulsive behavior is often a source of extreme stress for Darryl. However, in the end, they always settle their differences and make peace after the arguments and problems are resolved.
- Zoe MacPherson (E. G. Daily) is the infant daughter of Darryl and Wanda. As a baby, Zoe's curiosity and emotions are expressed in her vision, which show almost complete understanding when something happens or if somebody talks to her. Although calm and cheerful in the daytime, she is loud and cries nonstop at night, leaving her parents to stay up all night, taking turns rocking her, and carrying her until day time. Zoe appears to have a really close relationship with Rodney, the trouble kid next door who seems to be the only one who could stop her crying and comfort her.
- Melinda Bitterman (Arabella Field) is Wanda's friend and neighbor whose family is dysfunctional. Melinda is always seen smoking in her yard as her husband and kids are working on some bizarre, dangerous, or disastrous activity. Any time she sees Wanda, she always greets with the same line, "Hi Wanda, how's the baby?" Seemingly careless, or tired, Melinda seems to desire the happiness and relationship she once had before she became a mother and somewhat envies Wanda's stable life, but is still content with her family. She always talks in a calm voice, even when discussing an insane thing that her family is doing, as if it were normal.
- Carl Bitterman (Joel Murray) is Melinda's husky, big-muscled, and overweight husband. A seemingly bum like man, Carl claims that he gives his kids strict discipline, even though he has lowered himself to their level many times, particularly Rodney, who pesters Carl until he takes aggressive action. Carl is usually envied by Darryl, for his mechanic skills and other things Darryl fails at. Carl can be rude and obnoxious at times, but considers himself the "man of the house". He usually involves his children in several activities, such as practicing to shoot arrows or riding in a hover car without seat belts. He belittles Darryl's parenting skills, and self-confidence, either bluntly or through his children who have little respect for Darryl. Because of this, Carl and Darryl do not particularly get along, although Darryl has been talked into doing things he would not normally do, because of Carl's forceful insistence.
- Rodney Bitterman (Kath Soucie) is the eight-year-old son of Carl and Melinda Bitterman. Rodney is also the antagonist. Rodney is mischievous and is best known for causing a lot of trouble. However, he's the smartest of his siblings and is street wise. Rodney repeatedly pesters his dad by asking stupid questions, shooting knock-knock jokes to avoid going to bed, and placing his finger an inch from his father's tools immediately after being told not to touch them. Rodney's antics always makes his sister, Megan, laugh. Besides being a menace, he can be sympathetic, particularly to Darryl and Zoe. The sensitive side of Rodney has shown his somewhat neglected or misunderstood relationship with his dad. At one time, Rodney had tried one of Darryl's cheesy mushrooms and realized how much he cared about good food and wanted to cook. However, his father thought it was silly, so Rodney had relied on Darryl to help him. This preference to Darryl over his own father led Darryl to pride, despite Rodney's annoying and teasing Darryl many times previously. Rodney's sensitive side also shows through his a caring and loving relationship with Zoe.
- Megan Bitterman (Kath Soucie) is Rodney's younger sister and is close to Rodney. Megan is most commonly known for laughing out loud at anything Rodney does to pester their father. Megan is almost always seen with Rodney and keeps a huge smile on her face all the time. However, when Rodney is not around, she is seen to become sad and cry.
- Shelby Bitterman is Carl and Melinda's youngest son who is a sociopath and is always seen carrying a giant, green, baseball bat around which he hits things with, without expression. The episode "Hurtin' Inside" revealed he is four years old. He never speaks, but often communicates by pointing, and was once seen to whisper to his mother at a game of baseball in "The Bitterman Hillbillies".
- Bizzy Carey (Nicole Sullivan) is Darryl and Wanda's teenage friend who babysits Zoe on many occasions. The MacPhersons have known her since she was a girl scout. Bizzy seems to look older than she actually is, since Darryl's boss once bought Darryl's lie about her being his wife. She dislikes Drew Carey, her fake, morally responsible stepfather. Wanda and Darryl many times have had to question her about her many dysfunctional boyfriends. Bizzy is blonde-haired, thin, and has a fast metabolism, as she once claimed when Wanda discovered Bizzy had been sitting on the couch all day, eating a whole bag of chocolate chip cookies, with no worry, while babysitting. It is unknown if Bizzy is her real name or not.
- Kenny (Diedrich Bader) is Darryl's smooth-talking friend and co-worker at the office. Kenny is something of a nuisance to Darryl, such as bragging about his life and family, or poking fun at Darryl's personal relationship with Wanda. Darryl normally talks to Kenny about his problems at home, to which Kenny advises with either agreeable or non-agreeable mischievous ideas. Kenny's personality is seen to be laid back and worry-free, however, he grew upset and anxious one time Darryl stopped working for a while. Even though Kenny seems to think his family's normal, it's hinted that his wife was cheating on him with a neighbor, and that he might be a neglectful father, since for one second in an episode he forgot he had a third child.
- Charlie (Phil LaMarr) is the MacPhersons' pet dog.

=== Recurring and minor ===
- Rex (Phil LaMarr) and Josie (Wendy Raquel Robinson) are an African-American couple who are close friends of Darryl and Wanda's. Rex is known for appearing in sweaters similar to what Bill Cosby wore on The Cosby Show, while Josie's favorite pastime is gardening. In the episode "God Forbid", they admit that they are Moonies.
- Sylvia (Kath Soucie) and Midge (E. G. Daily) are a lesbian couple who are close friends of Darryl and Wanda's. Sylvia has black hair, while Midge is blonde.
- Mrs. Johnson (Alice Hirson) is an elderly lady, and another one of Darryl and Wanda's neighbors. She has an unseen son named Howard, a "man-child" who still loves to read comics in his treehouse.
- Officer Murphy (Jon Cryer) is an obese police officer who speaks with a stereotypical Irish accent.
- Dr. Gruber (Steven Weber) is the MacPhersons' big-nosed, big-eared family doctor who likes to make jokes. He appeared in two episodes straight, "Ugly Zoe" and "Wanda Proof".
- Hugh (Jim Cummings) and Maggie Wizowski (Elizabeth Perkins) are Wanda's parents who appeared in two episodes, "Rodney Moves In" and "A Baby Blues Christmas Special", along with Darryl's parents. Darryl criticized his father-in-law for telling lousy stories.
- Pauline (Linda Lavin) and "Mac" MacPherson are Darryl's mother and silent father.
- Bunny (Kath Soucie) is a close friend of Wanda's, and the only character from the comic strip, besides the MacPherson/Wizowski family, to appear in this series. However, unlike in the strip, where she has a son named Bogart, she has a baby boy with long blond hair named Haget. Butch, her husband from the original comic strip, never appears in the series.

== Production ==
Warner Bros. Animation produced eight of the season one episodes, with overseas animation done by Varga Studio in Hungary for five of them (including the pilot, which was also animated at the former TVC London Varga owned), and Sunwoo Entertainment in Korea for the three others. Rough Draft Studios in Los Angeles did five episodes, which include "Bizzy Moves In", "Rodney Has Two Daddies", "Hurtin' Inside", "Ugly Zoe", and "Wanda Moves Up".

The Baby Blues animated series took nearly five years to develop and produce, and what was initially the pilot, "A Baby Blues Christmas Special", was supposed to air in December 1998, but it was postponed more than once, while other episodes were being ordered and completed. The Christmas episode finally aired on Adult Swim on February 24, 2002.

=== Opening sequence ===
The opening theme song was a shorter version of "It's All Been Done" by Canadian rock band Barenaked Ladies, from their 1998 album Stunt. The title sequence was designed by Renegade Animation, who would later be known for Cartoon Network's Hi Hi Puffy AmiYumi, and shows the characters at the Warner Bros. studio lot.

== Episodes ==
=== Series overview ===
Season	Episodes	Originally released		
Season	Episodes	First released	Last released	Network
1	13	July 28, 2000	March 10, 2002	The WB (episodes 1–8); Adult Swim (episodes 9–13)
2	13	Unaired		N/A

=== Season 1 (2000–02) ===
No.	Title	Directed by	Written by	Original release date	Prod. code	Viewers (millions)
1	"God Forbid"	Shawn Björklund	Robert Kurtz & Eric Brand	July 28, 2000	225-056	2.53
Darryl and Wanda reluctantly recruit their colorful next door neighbors, the Bittermans, to be the caretakers of Zoe should something happen to them.
2	"Bizzy Moves In"	Rich Moore	Joey Soloway (Note: Credited as Jill Soloway; they changed their name to Joey Soloway in 2020.)	July 28, 2000	225-204	2.60
Wanda, going through a mid-life crisis, starts hanging out with Bizzy (Zoe's babysitter). When Wanda, Bizzy, and Bizzy's friends get arrested for breaking into an aquarium, Darryl must bail them out, much to his chagrin.
3	"Rodney Has Two Daddies"	Ron Hughart & Chris Sauvé	Story by : Jeff Martin and Peter Ocko and Leonard Dick and Joey Soloway; Teleplay by : Jeff Martin and Peter Ocko	August 4, 2000	225-206	2.42
Rodney becomes interested in culinary arts, but he keeps his passion for cooking a secret from his family, due to fear of disappointing his father. Darryl secretly becomes Rodney's cooking teacher, and due to the secrets and late nights out, Wanda becomes convinced Darryl is cheating on her. This episode features the song "Alternative Girlfriend" by Barenaked Ladies.
4	"Hurtin' Inside"	Susie Dietter	Leonard Dick	August 4, 2000	225-201	2.36
Wanda and Darryl, feeling concerned for Bizzy because of her physically abusive boyfriend, set out to find Bizzy a new boyfriend, with disastrous results.
5	"The Bitterman Hillbillies"	John Kafka	Joey Soloway	August 11, 2000	225-057	2.19
When the Bittermans become wealthy, Darryl becomes insanely jealous and feels his masculinity is threatened. Meanwhile, the Bittermans hire Bizzy to be a personal servant, leading to conflict between the MacPhersons and the Bittermans.
6	"World's Greatest Dad"	Bob Curtis	Jackie and Jeff Filgo	August 11, 2000	225-052	2.39
Darryl and Carl begin hanging out with their children at "Gumdrop Palace" (a Chuck E. Cheese-type location), where they enjoy watching the sexy, scantily-clad "Birthday Lady". Darryl feels guilty about this however, and begins showering Wanda with gifts and affection as a result.
7	"Rodney Moves In"	John Kafka	Jeff Martin & Peter Ocko	August 18, 2000	225-051	2.0
The MacPhersons discover that the only way they can get Zoe to cease her crying is by having Rodney sleep in her crib. Meanwhile, Melinda and Carl attempt to bring the spark back into their marriage, now that they have one of three annoying kids out of the picture.
8	"Ugly Zoe"	Brian Sheesley	Jeff Martin & Peter Ocko	August 25, 2000	225-205	1.86
Wanda freaks out about Zoe's pinkeye, cradle cap, and face scabs before an interview with a fancy, prestigious preschool. Meanwhile, Darryl pretends Bizzy is his wife to earn the attention and friendship of his boss. Note: This was the last episode to be broadcast on The WB, before the network canceled the series due to poor ratings.
9	"Wanda Proof"	Shawn Björklund	Leonard Dick	January 20, 2002	225-053	N/A
After Wanda accidentally injures Zoe by dropping her off the diaper changing table, Darryl begins to "babyproof" the house. When Wanda accidentally jabs an anal thermometer in Zoe's rectum, she rushes Zoe to the hospital, and attempts to keep the visit a secret from Darryl. Note: This was the first episode to premiere on Cartoon Network (Adult Swim), which aired the final five unaired remaining episodes from the first season.
10	"The Bad Family"	John Kafka	Matthew Weiner	January 27, 2002	225-054	N/A
Due to a series of misunderstandings, the MacPhersons are ostracized as the "bad family" in the neighborhood.
11	"Teddy-Cam"	Bob Curtis	Leonard Dick	February 3, 2002	225-055	N/A
Darryl becomes jealous when Wanda befriends Bizzy's new boyfriend, and becomes convinced that Wanda might cheat on him. Carl talks Darryl into using a teddy bear stuffed with a camera to spy on Wanda while he is away at work.
12	"A Baby Blues Christmas Special"	Tony Cervone	Peter Ocko, Adam Barr & Jeff Martin	February 24, 2002	475-137	N/A
Serving as a prequel to the series, this episode revolves around the birth of Zoe around Christmastime, and Darryl and Wanda's struggles as new parents.
13	"Wanda Moves Up"	Peter Avanzino	Bill Freiberger	March 10, 2002	225-203	N/A
Tired of being a stay-at-home mom, Wanda rejoins the working world, and becomes unexpectedly successful. Meanwhile, Darryl, while staying home and taking care of Zoe, begins to miss going to work.

=== Season 2 ===
In September 2000, Warner Bros. announced that The WB had renewed Baby Blues for a second season. Although a second season, consisting of 13 episodes, was produced, it has never aired. Kirkman stated that the second season was nearly complete, and only needed a few final edits (such as replacing the temp music), before it was ready for release. Despite this, however, Kirkman also states that the season was written off as a loss by The WB as an accounting practice, and "will probably never see the light of day".

== Broadcast ==
The WB typically aired two episodes each week, thus enabling eight different episodes to be shown in the five-week run, but abandoned plans to air additional episodes that had been completed. Previously unaired episodes from the first season later aired on Cartoon Network's late night programming block, Adult Swim, and later on sister channel TBS, and on Teletoon at Night in Canada.

== Reception ==
When Baby Blues aired on The WB, it got moderate to low ratings, resulting in its cancellation in August 2000. The series also received mixed to negative reviews from professional critics. Particularly, on its premiere night, South Coast Today wrote that "'Baby Blues' is hardly perfect. Its teen characters are right out of the MTV/WB playbook; the notion of a nutty family next door is as old as the sitcom hills. But as a slightly silly, slightly sweet summer series that's not afraid to show it has a heart, it more than exceeds even this cranky critic's expectations." David Bianculli of New York Daily News was negative toward Baby Blues, giving it 1 1/2 stars, and called it "depressingly flat". Also in the article, he wrote "Timing and originality, even in comedy, may not be everything – but they count for a lot, and WB's new 'Baby Blues' series doesn't get high marks in either category. First, 'Baby Blues', which premieres with a double header tonight at 8, is an animated prime-time comedy, arriving the summer after a season in which there were too many dull entries in that particular genre. That's bad timing. 'Baby Blues' could overcome that by being funnier than the rest. Unfortunately, it's not. Second, 'Baby Blues', based on the syndicated comic strip by Rick Kirkman and Jerry Scott, is a sitcom in two dimensions. That is, it's an animated show in which human beings engage in everyday activities – working, goofing off, sleeping, fighting and so on. At its best, this particular category of animated comedy gives you 'The Simpsons'. At its worst, it gives you 'Clerks'."
