= Talk to the Hand: Live in Michigan =

Live album by Barenaked Ladies
- Released: 6 November 2007
- Recorded: 15 June 2007
- Genre: Alternative rock
- Length: 67:26
- Label: Desperation Records
- Producer: Barenaked Ladies

Barenaked Ladies chronology
Barenaked Ladies Are Men (2007)	Talk to the Hand: Live in Michigan (2007)	Snacktime! (2008)

Professional ratings
Review scores
Source	Rating
Allmusic	2.5/5 stars
NeuFutur	6.9/10
Nights And Weekends	(Favorable)

Talk to the Hand: Live in Michigan is a live album and DVD concert video release from Canadian band Barenaked Ladies, produced by Morningstar Entertainment, Groovepix, and Desperation Records. The DVD is their third DVD-video release, and their first feature-length concert video offered for sale. The CD is their second live album after Rock Spectacle (1996). The concert was recorded at the DTE Energy Music Theatre in Clarkston, Michigan on 15 June 2007 during the BLAM Tour, in conjunction with the local Detroit PBS affiliate, WTVS. The special aired on the SUN TV on 12 October 2007.

The DVD is available both separately and packaged together with a CD version in one package, was released on 6 November 2007. Both include 15 songs of the 24 that were performed, an adlib, and several banters. Bonus features on the DVD include a 12-minute "behind the scenes" featurette including band interviews, soundchecks and concert photos. The CD runs approximately 68 minutes, while the DVD runs 90 including special features. The video is in 16:9 widescreen format, and 5.1 DTS surround sound, with an option for standard Stereo sound.

The cover art for Talk to the Hand: Live in Michigan is in the same style as that of Barenaked Ladies Are Me / Barenaked Ladies Are Men and its related merchandise, and was designed by Team Macho. The products are sold in eco-friendly packaging composed of 100% post-consumer recycled products, printed with vegetable inks, and wrapped with Bi-Ax transparent film. The disc trays of the DVD-only version are made of PaperFoam, which is produced from potato or tapioca starches, while the CD/DVD combo package contains the discs and booklet in cardboard pockets.

== Track listing ==
All tracks are written by Steven Page and Ed Robertson, except where noted.

No.	Title	Writer(s)	Lead Vocal(s)	Length
1.	"One Week"	Ed Robertson	Steven Page; Ed Robertson	3:00
2.	"The Old Apartment"		Steven Page	5:20
3.	"Sound Of Your Voice"	Kevin Hearn	Steven Page	3:49
4.	"Bank Job"		Ed Robertson	4:31
5.	"Too Little Too Late"		Steven Page	4:18
6.	"Adrift"	Steven Page; Ed Robertson; Kevin Hearn	Steven Page; Ed Robertson; Kevin Hearn; Jim Creeggan	3:26
7.	"For You" (acoustic)		Ed Robertson	4:58
8.	"Be My Yoko Ono" (acoustic)		Steven Page; Ed Robertson	3:20
9.	"Wind It Up"		Ed Robertson	4:29
10.	"Angry People"		Steven Page	4:44
11.	"Pinch Me"		Ed Robertson	4:47
12.	"Powder Blue"	Steven Page; Stephen Duffy	Steven Page	5:09
13.	"Brian Wilson"	Steven Page	Steven Page	5:01
14.	"Easy"		Ed Robertson	4:33
15.	"If I Had $100,000,000"		Steven Page; Ed Robertson	6:02
Total length:				1:07:18

CD and DVD releases include ad-libbed banters after "The Old Apartment", "Sound of Your Voice", "Too Little Too Late" and "For You".

Songs performed but not included are "Maybe Katie", "In the Car", "Running Out of Ink", "Get In Line", "Tonight is the Night I Fell Asleep at the Wheel" (acoustic), "Alcohol", "It's All Been Done", "Lovers in a Dangerous Time" and "Call and Answer".
