= Arabella Field =

American actress and film producer

- Years active: 1992–present
- Spouse(s): Brian Gerber (m. ??; d. 2012)
- Children: 2

Arabella Field is an American actress and film producer known for her roles in films such as Dante's Peak, Feeling Minnesota, Godzilla, National Treasure, Paper Man and as Melinda Bitterman in the animated television version of Rick Kirkman and Jerry Scott's daily comic strip Baby Blues.

== Career ==
She has guest starred in a number of notable television series, including The Sopranos, Seinfeld, Law & Order, Numb3rs, House, Rules of Engagement, In Case of Emergency and other shows. She had a recurring role playing Patsi Moosekian in the show Under Suspicion.

In 2010, Field starred in the web series Sex and the Austen Girl on Babelgum, produced and directed by her husband, Brian Gerber. Field and Gerber had two children together before his death, by suicide, in 2012.

== Producer credits ==
Title	Year	Role
Tell Me Do You Miss Me	2006	Co-producer
Sunny and Share Love You	2007	Co-producer
Sex and the Austen Girl	2010	Co-producer

== Filmography ==
=== Film ===
Year	Title	Role	Notes
1992	Laws of Gravity	Celia	
1993	Naked in New York	Tammy Taylor	
1993	Mr. Wonderful	Patti	
1993	The Wake	Ann	
1995	New Jersey Drive	Female Jury Member	
1995	The Pompatus of Love	Lori	
1996	Feeling Minnesota	Manager's Wife	
1997	Dante's Peak	Nancy	
1998	Godzilla	Lucy Palotti	
1999	Freak Talks About Sex	Carl	
2002	Bug	Annelle Johnson	
2004	National Treasure	Abigail's Secretary	
2006	Bonneville	Police Officer	
2007	Sunny & Share Love You	Mrs. Magoo	
2009	Flying By	Beth	
2009	Paper Man	Lucy	
2013	Louder Than Words	Fundraising Consultant	
2014	The Town That Dreaded Sundown	Dr. Kelly	

=== Television ===
Year	Title	Role	Notes
1989, 1990	Another World	Eve Miller	2 episodes
1992	Terror on Track 9	Joyce	Television film
1994–1995	Under Suspicion	Patsi Moosekian	8 episodes
1995	If Not for You	Paula Schaffer	Episode: "Pilot"
1995	New York News	Jennifer	Episode: "Yankee Glory"
1997	Seinfeld	Miranda	Episode: "The Merv Griffin Show"
1999	Touched by an Angel	Natalie Billings	Episode: "Jagged Edges"
1999	Suddenly Susan	Oxnard Stites	Episode: "The First Picture Show"
2000–2002	Baby Blues	Various roles	6 episodes
2001	The Practice	Karen Larson	Episode: "The Confession"
2002	The Division	Darlene Meyers	Episode: "Shelby"
2002	A Baby Blues Christmas Special	Melinda Bitterman	Television film
2002	They Shoot Divas, Don't They?	Celia	Television film
2002	JAG	Lt. Cmdr. Nancy Yorkin	Episode: "Offensive Action"
2005	What I Like About You	Katherine	Episode: "Nobody's Perfect"
2005	Numbers	Susan Meyers	Episode: "Sniper Zero"
2005	Inconceivable	Nurse Field	Episode: "Pilot"
2005	Law & Order	Susan Alfani	Episode: "Age of Innocence"
2006	The Evidence	Dr. Susan Legato	Episode: "Borrowed Time"
2006	The Sopranos	Amy	Episode: "Kaisha"
2007	House	Judy Lipa	Episode: "Needle in a Haystack"
2007	In Case of Emergency	Stephanie Yablonsky	2 episodes
2010	Sex and the Austen Girl	Courtney Stone	8 episodes
2013	Rules of Engagement	Dorothy	Episode: "Liz Moves In"
2013	Monday Mornings	Marilyn Cooper Kupcheck	Episode: "Who's Sorry Now"
2013	American Horror Story: Coven	Nora Benson	Episode: "Bitchcraft"
2013	Ironside	Maggie Schwartz	2 episodes
