= List of fictional United States Democrats =

The following is a list of fictional characters who have associated with the Democratic Party of the United States. The list can include television characters, film characters, literature characters, or fictional characters from any other medium.

== Characters identified as Democrats ==
The following is a list of fictional television characters who were described as Democrats or who are associated with the Democratic Party. This section is only intended to include fictional characters who explicitly identified as Democrats.

=== Film ===
- Bill McKay, Senate candidate played by Robert Redford, in The Candidate (1972) is a Democrat.
- Barbara Baxley talks about the Kennedys in Nashville (1975).
- Gore Vidal plays a Democrat Senator in Bob Roberts (1992).
- Michael Douglas portrays Democratic President Andy Shepherd in The American President (1995).
- Ethan Hawke steals John McCain presidential campaign signs in Boyhood (2014).
- Fred Flarsky in Long Shot (2019) hates Republicans.
- Will Hayes from Definitely, Maybe worked on Bill Clinton's 1992 campaign.

=== Television ===
- Grace Adler from Will & Grace – "I'm allergic to Bees and I'm a Democrat."
- Lloyd Braun on Seinfeld – worked for David Dinkins, a Democratic mayor of New York City.
- Rebecca Bunch from Crazy Ex-Girlfriend stated that she is liberal.
- Christine Campbell on The New Adventures of Old Christine – founded her college's branch of the College Democrats
- Fraiser Crane from Fraiser – Does a campaign commercial for a Democratic congressional candidate
- John Dorian from Scrubs – On the episode My Number One Doc", wore a shirt during a game of basketball which said "Ass Man" with the Democratic donkey
- Shirley Feeney from Laverne & Shirley, when introduced to "Rhonda Lee, actress, model, dancer", replies "Shirley Feeney, Irish, Protestant, Democrat".
- Alicia Florrick and Peter Florrick from The Good Wife run for office as Democrats.
- Lorelai Gilmore – Despite her parents being strict conservatives, she registered as a Democrat
- Steven Keaton and Elyse Keaton from Family Ties - former 1960's hippies and lifetime war protesters which put them at odds with their staunchly conservative Republican son, Alex P. Keaton.
- Murray Klein on Archie Bunker's Place
- Leslie Knope from Parks and Recreation was chosen by the Democratic National Committee to run for Governor of Indiana. She was also described on the show as having political views that were "...to the left of Leon Trotsky."
- Diane Lockhart from The Good Wife and The Good Fight expresses many Democratic views, and identifies as a Democrat.
- Olivia Marsdin (portrayed by Lynda Carter) from Supergirl who served as the President of the USA on Kara's Earth for sometime, identifies as a Democrat.
- David Palmer from 24 – In one episode, his wife mentions that he is running for President as a Democrat.
- Captain "Hawkeye" Pierce on M*A*S*H. Identified himself as a Democrat in a letter to President Harry S. Truman (also a Democrat).
- Harry Stone from Night Court – In the episode "Prince of a Guy", he introduces himself as a registered Democrat.
- Jack Tanner from Tanner '88, portrayed by Michael Murphy, is a former Congressman who runs for president in the 1988 Democratic primaries.
- Karen Tyler on Wonderfalls is revealed to be a "closet Democrat" on the DVD commentary track, although she attends Republican gatherings with her husband and daughter.
- Claire Underwood – Wife of Frank Underwood, later Second Lady of the United States, First Lady of the United States, and eventually the 47th President of the United States
- Frank Underwood – Initially a Democratic Congressman representing South Carolina's 5th congressional district and House Majority Whip, later Vice President of the United States and eventually the 46th President of the United States
- Lindsey Weir on Freaks and Geeks – Stated she is a Democrat and asked George H. W. Bush a critical question at her school
- Dorothy Zbornak from The Golden Girls when Sophia said Dorothy had a Michael Dukakis bumper sticker covering a Walter Mondale bumper sticker.
- Robert Singer from The Boys.
- Victoria Neuman from The Boys.

=== Animation ===
- Joe Quimby from The Simpsons ran for mayor as a Democrat in the episode "Sideshow Bob Roberts".
- Terry Bates and Haley Smith from American Dad! has mentioned himself to be a Democrat.

==== Characters on The West Wing ====
The West Wing depicts the workings of a fictional Democratic presidential administration and many of its major characters are explicitly identified as Democrats.

- Will Bailey - White House staff member and later Congressman
- Abbey Bartlet - First Lady of the United States
- Josiah Bartlet - the incumbent Democratic President of the United States
- C.J. Cregg - White House Press Secretary and later White House Chief of Staff in the Bartlet administration
- Josh Lyman - White House Deputy Chief of Staff in the Bartlet administration, campaign manager for a Democratic candidate Matt Santos, and later White House Chief of Staff in the Santos administration
- Leo McGarry - White House Chief of Staff in the Bartlet administration
- Donna Moss - Senior Assistant to the Deputy Chief of Staff in the Bartlet administration
- Matt Santos - Democratic Congressman from Texas, later presidential candidate and eventually President
- Sam Seaborn - White House Deputy Communications Director in the Bartlet administration and later Democratic candidate for Congress
- Toby Ziegler - White House Communications Director in the Bartlet administration

==== Characters on The Wire ====
On the show it is stated that Democrats outnumber Republicans in Baltimore, Maryland 9 to 1, causing the Democratic mayoral primary to be the city's most important election.

- Tommy Carcetti
- Clarence Royce - Mayor of Baltimore
- Tony Gray (ran in same primary as Carcetti and Royce)
- Norman Wilson (Carcetti's deputy campaign manager)
- Theresa D'Agostino (Carcetti's consultant, later went to work for the DCCC)
- Coleman Parker (Royce's chief of staff)
- Clay Davis (went to Democratic fundraiser in Season 2, supported Royce's re-election)
- Odell Watkins (switched allegiance from Royce to Carcetti)
- Stanislaus Valchek (Polish-American police major who commands Southeastern district and has suction with all important Democratic organizations in or around the district.)

== Characters who endorsed a Democratic candidate ==
=== Television ===
- Tom Lennox from 24 endorsed David Palmer for President.
- Winnie Cooper on The Wonder Years worked on the McGovern campaign in 1972.
- Penny from The Big Bang Theory wore a Hillary 2008 T-shirt in the episode "The Dead Hooker Juxtaposition."
- Joe and Brian Hackett of Wings acknowledged in separate episodes having voted for Michael Dukakis in 1988.
- Steven and Elyse Keaton from Family Ties both voted for Walter Mondale in 1984.
- Michael Stivic of All in the Family donated money to the McGovern campaign.
- Richie Cunningham on Happy Days campaigned for Adlai Stevenson II in 1956.
- Mary Richards from Mary Tyler Moore In her spare time she volunteered with her neighbor Phyllis in support of Democratic Party candidates.
- Edith Bunker from All in the Family voted for Jimmy Carter in 1976.
- Sylvia Rosenberg Fine from The Nanny owned a Vote Dukakis - banner.
- Jim Walsh and Cindy Walsh on Beverly Hills, 90210 voted for Walter Mondale for in 1984. This stands to reason as the Walshes lived in Minnesota at the time, and Mondale was a United States Senator from Minnesota before becoming Vice President under Jimmy Carter.
- Real Jennifer on The Pleasure Zone said she voted "Democrat straight down the line."
- Susan Keats on Beverly Hills, 90210 worked on the Clinton/Gore campaign
- Eric Camden on 7th Heaven backed Jimmy Carter in 1976.
- Dorothy Zbornak on The Golden Girls had a Michael Dukakis bumper sticker (covering a Walter Mondale bumper sticker) and planned to confront President George H. W. Bush when he visited Miami, but wound up tongue-tied upon meeting him face-to-face.
- Laurie Miller on Swingtown worked on the Jimmy Carter campaign in 1976.
- Sandy Cohen on The O.C. worked on the Walter Mondale campaign in 1984.
- Neil Roberts on The O.C. voted for John Kerry in 2004.
- Chief Jack Mannion on The District was appointed the District of Columbia Chief of Police by Washington, D.C. Mayor Anthony A. Williams.
- Super Dave Osborne on Jimmy Kimmel Live! spoke at the 2008 Democratic National Convention.
- Maude Findlay on Maude always voted for Democratic candidates.
- Mary Anne Bailey (Tori Spelling) in the episode "The Time Has Come Today" of Beverly Hills 90210, campaigned for Robert F. Kennedy in 1968.
- Eddie Thundercloud on MadTV sought the Democratic Party nomination for president in 2008.
- Thomas Gavin on Rescue Me, says he voted for Obama when he first ran for office.
- The mother of Dustin Henderson from Stranger Things has a sign in her yard endorsing Walter Mondale in the 1984 United States Presidential Election.
- Fiona Goode on American Horror Story: Coven said she voted for Barack Obama twice.

==== Animation ====
- Milhouse Van Houten on The Simpsons becomes a senior White House aide for President Lisa Simpson in the episode Bart to the Future, although this probably has more to do with his romantic interests than any ideological sympathy.
- Bumblebee Man on The Simpsons attended a meeting of the Springfield Democratic Party.
- Avril Ward in the "Bart vs. Australia" episode of The Simpsons was appointed United States Ambassador to Australia by President Bill Clinton.
- Marge Simpson from The Simpsons supported Jimmy Carter in 1976 and 1980 and Governor Mary Bailey.
- Homer Simpson, although supporting Republican Montgomery Burns for governor and Krusty the Clown for US Representative, most recently attempted to vote for Barack Obama in The Simpsons episode "Treehouse of Horror XIX" in 2008. (He tried six to vote for Obama, but all of his votes went to John McCain because he was in a rigged voting machine that later ate him. Homer may be too stupid to have a political ideology).
- Randy Marsh on South Park spoke out against the Iraq War and supported Giant Douche in 2004 and Barack Obama in 2008.
- Kyle Broflovski from South Park supported Giant Douche and he hates Cartman.
- In the American Dad! episode "Railroaded", Roger mentions that he was a campaign manager for Aldai Stevenson's presidential runs in both 1952 and 1956.
- Mr. and Mrs. Turner from The Fairly OddParents once had a bumper sticker that read "Clinton/Gore".
- Riley Freeman, Robert Freeman, Tom DuBois, Sarah DuBois and Thugnificent from The Boondocks all endorsed Barack Obama for president in 2008.
- Brian Griffin from Family Guy had a bumper sticker on his Toyota Prius that read "Kucinich '04".

=== Film ===
- In Dogma, Jay (Jason Mewes) and Silent Bob said that they were pro-choice when compared to the protesters at the abortion clinic after saving Bethany Slone (Linda Fiorentino).
- Elizabeth Darko in the film Donnie Darko expresses support for the Democrats during the 1988 election. Her first line in the movie is "I'm voting for Dukakis."
- Sheriff J.C. Connors (Ned Beatty) in White Lightning described himself as a conservative Democrat when he referred to the Nixon administration as a dictatorship that would send "long haired, smart aleck hippies" to Bogan County, and President Richard M. Nixon's policies as Communism.
- Mason, Jr. in Boyhood. This was President Barack Obama's favorite film of 2014.
- The Bower family in The One and Only, Genuine, Original Family Band performed at the 1888 Democratic National Convention.
- The Mayor (John Vernon) in Dirty Harry
- Paul Kersey (Charles Bronson) in Death Wish
- Dr. Kathy Wahlund (Jane Lynch) in The Fugitive wears a button that reads "Hate is not a family value" seemingly defiant of the Republican Party ethos at that time.
- Michael Malone (Kevin Farley) in An American Carol
- President Andrew Sheppard (Michael Douglas) in The American President
- Donald "Don" Greenleaf (Dennis Hopper) in Swing Vote
- Sheila Hamilton (Eloise Hardt) in The Kentucky Fried Movie
- Harley Quinn from the DC Extended Universe entry Birds of Prey voted for Bernie Sanders in the 2016 caucuses.
- Sammy Fabelman (Gabriel LaBelle) in The Fabelmans openly expresses dismay to his father about his former roommate voting for Barry Goldwater.

=== Print ===
- Jeremy Duncan from Zits once said "The more I read about politics, the more I like what the Democrats are saying." However, his father once described Jeremy's anguish over his first pay check being taxed as "The birth of another Republican" so Jeremy could really be either a Democrat or Republican. It is also shown that there is an Obama/Biden bumper sticker in Jeremy's room. Once in a dream, Jeremy was shocked by his older self who stated that he would vote Republican here and there and then next thing he knew, he was wearing elastic-waist pants and sporting a comb-over
- Paul Benjamin in Death Wish
- Monty Montahue from Monty backed John F. Kerry in 2004 and Barack Obama in 2008.
- President Kathy Alton in The Illuminati
- Satchel Pooch from Get Fuzzy supported Kerry in 2004. Once when Bucky Katt threatened to post a photo-shopped picture of him hugging Obama, Satchel replied that he would love that. He also has a picture of him kissing a portrait of Dennis Kucinich on his Myspace page.
- Wanda MacPherson from Baby Blues is said by her husband to have voted Democrat.

== See also ==
- List of fictional United States Republicans
