= Talk to the hand (disambiguation) =

Talk to the hand is an English language slang phrase.

Talk to the Hand may also refer to:

- Talk to the Hand: Live in Michigan, a live album and DVD by Barenaked Ladies
- "Talk to the Hand", a song by Honeyz
- Talk to the Hand: The Utter Bloody Rudeness of the World Today, or Six Good Reasons to Stay Home and Bolt the Door, a book by Lynne Truss
- "Parle à ma main" ("Talk to the hand" in English), a 2006 song recorded by French act Fatal Bazooka featuring Yelle
- Talk to the Hand (Dexter), an episode of the American television series Dexter
