= Alternative Girlfriend =

1994 single by Barenaked Ladies

- Spain CD single picture sleeve

Single by Barenaked Ladies

from the album Maybe You Should Drive
- Released: 1994
- Length: 4:23
- Label: Reprise
- Songwriters: Stephen Duffy; Steven Page
- Producer: Ben Mink

Barenaked Ladies singles chronology
"Jane" (1994)	"Alternative Girlfriend" (1994)	"Shoe Box" (1995)

"Alternative Girlfriend" is a song by Canadian alternative rock band Barenaked Ladies, from their 1994 album Maybe You Should Drive. Written by Stephen Duffy and Steven Page, the song was released as the second single from the album and peaked at No. 22 on the Canadian RPM 100 Hit Tracks chart and No. 4 on the RPM Adult Contemporary chart. It later appeared on their 2001 compilation, Disc One: All Their Greatest Hits.

== Composition ==
Steven Page explained in the liner notes of the album Disc One: All Their Greatest Hits (1991–2001) that the song was an attempt to mimic the grunge music from Seattle, and that it is the first song they wrote with a heavier sound (with the exception of "Grade 9" from Gordon).

== Personnel ==
- Steven Page – lead vocals, electric guitar
- Ed Robertson – electric guitar, background vocals
- Jim Creeggan – electric bass, background vocals
- Andy Creeggan – electric piano, organ, tambourine, background vocals
- Tyler Stewart – drums

== Charts ==
=== Weekly charts ===
Chart (1994–1995)	Peak position
Canada Top Singles (RPM)	22
Canada Adult Contemporary (RPM)	4

=== Year-end charts ===
Chart (1995)	Position
Canada Adult Contemporary (RPM)	69

== In popular culture ==
The song was featured in the Baby Blues episode "Rodney Has Two Daddies". Coincidentally, that series used "It's All Been Done" (from the band's 1998 album Stunt) as its theme song.
