= One Week (song) =

1998 single by Barenaked Ladies

Single by Barenaked Ladies

from the album Stunt
- B-side: "When You Dream"
- Released: September 15, 1998
- Genre: Pop rock; alternative rock; pop; rap rock
- Length: 2:48
- Label: Reprise
- Songwriter: Ed Robertson
- Producers: Barenaked Ladies; David Leonard; Susan Rogers

Barenaked Ladies singles chronology
"Brian Wilson (2000)" (1997)	"One Week" (1998)	"It's All Been Done" (1998)

Music video
- "One Week" on YouTube

"One Week" is a song by Canadian rock band Barenaked Ladies released as the first single from their 1998 album, Stunt. It was written by Ed Robertson, who is featured on the lead vocal of the rapped verses. Steven Page sings lead on the song's main hooks, while the two co-lead the pre-hooks in harmony. The song is notable for its significant number of pop culture references (along with foods and places). It was serviced to US rock radio on June 2, 1998, and was released commercially on September 15.

"One Week" remains the band's best-known song in the United States, where it topped the Billboard Hot 100 chart, coincidentally remaining at the top spot for one week. In Canada, the song reached No. 3 on the RPM 100 Hit Tracks chart, while worldwide, the song entered the top 10 in Iceland and the United Kingdom. Apple used the song at MacWorld 1999 for presenting Mac OS X Server on a wall of 50 iMacs.

== History ==
Ed Robertson wrote the ideas for the non-rap "hooks" with the concept being the structure of a fight where the protagonist knows they're wrong and is just trying to save face. Robertson wanted to come up with a rapped verse for the song but all attempts failed. Bandmate Steven Page suggested he simply improvise the rap, as the two did onstage every night. Robertson heeded the advice and set up a video camera. He improvised the song at a slower pace to make rhyming easier and arrived at about four minutes of rap. He sent it to Page, who told him not to change a word. Two minutes of the improvising was almost directly compiled (with very little, if any, tweaking) into the verses of the song. Due to its improvised nature, the rapped sections are not intended to have any direct relation to the plot of the sung sections. The lyrics in the liner notes from Stunt contain some additional lines of rap that did not make it into the recorded version.

Band members have stated that the first live run-through of "One Week" did not go well and that it took some time to get the song to sound good live. The instrumental parts are played by band members, notably Ed Robertson on guitar, and Kevin Hearn sometimes on guitar and sometimes on keyboards; as well, while Hearn was away from touring shortly after the song's release, his place at shows was taken by one of two other musicians on keyboards who each added their own unique parts to the song, helping to shape its live sound early.

The song is rife with references to pop culture, food, drink, activities, and places. References include the comic book Aquaman, Toronto-based eatery Swiss Chalet, East Asian foods sushi and wasabi, country singer LeAnn Rimes, German music composer Bert Kaempfert, vanilla milkshakes, the film Vertigo, hip-hop group A Tribe Called Quest's song "Scenario", sci-fi series The X-Files and its character the Smoking Man, the film Frantic and its movie star Harrison Ford, British musician Sting, tantric sex, confectionery brand Snickers (and its then-slogan "Guaranteed to satisfy"), Japanese filmmaker Akira Kurosawa, golf clubs, anime series Sailor Moon, sports venue Birchmount Stadium and its annual Robbie International Soccer Tournament.

In performances beginning in 2003, the band developed an acoustic, bluegrass version of the song (released five years later). It is typically used in a new performance setting they developed on the Peepshow Tour that year, in which they play acoustically while they stand around and sing into one omni-directional microphone. With the departure of Page in January 2009, Hearn has assumed lead vocal duties on most hooks. Hearn often sings the hooks together with drummer Tyler Stewart, who also performs the harmonies during the bridge. Both the third, final hooks and the following, ending part of the song are sung by Robertson, along with Stewart's harmonizing.

== Critical reception ==
AllMusic's Liana Jonas called the song, "a well-crafted recording, which marries words that are funny and endearing with clever and bouncy music. Added kudos must be given to Robertson and co-frontman Steven Page for singing such a speedy mouthful without skipping a beat."

== Music video ==
The music video was directed by McG and begins with the band performing the song in a royal court, featuring a singing girl on a wind-up pedestal (portrayed by Kiva Dawson), similar to a scene from the movie Chitty Chitty Bang Bang. During the interlude they make an escape and sing while driving a lookalike of the General Lee from The Dukes of Hazzard (using the numbers 07 instead of 01, minus the Confederate flag on the roof, and a 1968 rather than 1969 model year) and Starsky & Hutch's Ford Gran Torino. The band drives into a suburb, where they perform a concert in front of a 1950s bus, with a female motorcyclist, dressed like Evel Knievel, performing stunts. The video ends with a shot of the motorcyclist stuck on a tree. The video features Carmit Bachar from The Pussycat Dolls playing an angel.

== Track listings ==
Canadian and US CD single; US cassette single

1. "One Week" (remix) – 2:52
2. "When You Dream" (home demo) – 4:22
3. "Shoe Box" (live) – 2:54

US 7-inch single

A. "One Week" (remix) – 2:52
B. "When You Dream" (home demo) – 4:22

UK CD single

1. "One Week" (remix) – 2:52
2. "When You Dream" (home demo) – 5:19
3. "Shoe Box" (live) – 2:56

UK cassette single

1. "One Week" (remix) – 2:52
2. "When You Dream" (home demo) – 5:19

Australian and Japanese CD EP

1. "One Week" (remix)
2. "The Old Apartment"
3. "Brian Wilson" (live)
4. "Be My Yoko Ono"
5. "Alternative Girlfriend"

Australian remix CD single

1. "One Week" (Dave's big beat remix) – 3:22
2. "One Week" (Pull's Break remix) – 3:21
3. "One Week" (original radio remix) – 2:52
4. "One Week" (Dave's big beat extended remix) – 6:14

== Personnel ==
- Ed Robertson – vocals, acoustic and electric guitars
- Steven Page – vocals
- Jim Creeggan – electric upright bass
- Kevin Hearn – electric guitar, keyboards
- Tyler Stewart – drums

== Charts ==
=== Weekly charts ===
Chart (1998–1999)	Peak position
Australia (ARIA)	16
Canada Top Singles (RPM)	3
Canada Adult Contemporary (RPM)	5
Europe (Eurochart Hot 100)	23
Iceland (Íslenski Listinn Topp 40)	5
Ireland (IRMA)	29
Netherlands (Single Top 100)	79
Scottish Singles Sales (Official Charts)	5
UK Singles (Official Charts)	5
US Billboard Hot 100	1
US Adult Alternative Airplay (Billboard)	2
US Adult Pop Airplay (Billboard)	2
US Alternative Airplay (Billboard)	1
US Pop Airplay (Billboard)	1

=== Year-end charts ===
Chart (1998)	Position
Australia (ARIA)	71
Canada Top Singles (RPM)	27
Canada Adult Contemporary (RPM)	19
Iceland (Íslenski Listinn Topp 40)	84
US Billboard Hot 100	51
US Adult Top 40 (Billboard)	20
US Mainstream Top 40 (Billboard)	22
US Modern Rock Tracks (Billboard)	10
US Triple-A (Billboard)	11

Chart (1999)	Position
UK Singles (OCC)	104
UK Airplay (Music Week)	41
US Adult Top 40 (Billboard)	42
US Mainstream Top 40 (Billboard)	72

== Certifications ==
Region	Certification	Certified units/sales
Australia (ARIA)	Gold	35,000^{^}
New Zealand (RMNZ)	Platinum	30,000^{‡}
United Kingdom (BPI)	Platinum	600,000^{‡}
^{^} Shipments figures based on certification alone.^{‡} Sales+streaming figures based on certification alone.

== Release history ==
Region	Date	Format(s)	Label(s)	Ref.
United States	June 2, 1998	Modern rock; triple A radio	Reprise	
Canada	June 9, 1998	Radio	Reprise	
United States	July 21, 1998	Contemporary hit radio	Reprise	
United States	September 15, 1998	CD	Reprise	
Canada	September 15, 1998	CD	Reprise	
United Kingdom	February 8, 1999	CD; cassette	Reprise	
Japan	February 24, 1999	CD	Reprise	

== In popular culture ==
"Weird Al" Yankovic released a parody of "One Week" on his 1999 album Running with Scissors, entitled "Jerry Springer", about the narrator's obsession with The Jerry Springer Show. Ed Robertson would later call the parody a highlight of his career.

"One Week" appears as a recurring element of the mashup album Mouth Moods by American musician Neil Cicierega.

The song was used in a 2002 Mitsubishi Lancer commercial in which a number of young people sing along with the song as it presumably plays on the radio and they drive around a parking structure.

It was used in Digimon: The Movie and subsequently featured on its original motion picture soundtrack. The song was also featured in the 1999 comedy films American Pie and 10 Things I Hate About You.

The song was also featured in the What We Do in the Shadows episode, "The Wellness Center".
