= Zits (comics) =

Comic strip

- Jeremy Duncan and Hector Garcia—best friends
- Author(s): Jerry Scott, Jim Borgman
- Current status/schedule: Running
- Launch date: July 7, 1997; 29 years ago
- Syndicate: King Features Syndicate
- Genre(s): Humor, coming-of-age

Zits is a comic strip written by cartoonist Jerry Scott and illustrated by Jim Borgman about the life of Jeremy Duncan, a 17-year-old high school junior (he was 15 when the comic started). The comic debuted in July 7, 1997, in over 200 newspapers, and by 1998 it was included in "more than 1,700 newspapers worldwide in 45 countries and is translated into 15 different languages." Zits has received multiple awards and continues to be syndicated by King Features.

Set in Ohio, possibly in the town of Bucyrus in the northern part of the state (going by the Hard Rock Cafe T-shirt worn by Jeremy’s father on Aug. 14, 2026), the strip centers on Jeremy as he tries to balance his family life, social life, the academic demands of high school and his plans for the future, often with a heavy dose of surrealism, making it stand out from being just a typical teenager cartoon strip.

On March 19, 2026, it was announced that the comic strip will end in 2026. Jerry Scott will also be ending Baby Blues.

== Origin ==
In 1996, Jerry Scott was drawing Baby Blues, a comic strip about raising children he co-wrote with Rick Kirkman. He realized, however, that his profession as an independent cartoonist was limited to whatever joke he could conceive next. A friend suggested he begin a strip about a teenager. Scott heeded the proposition but was unsatisfied with his character's sketches, finding them similar to those of his existing strip. After Scott discussed the issue with his artist friend Jim Borgman, the two corresponded with one another over the next few months and eventually collaborated on the characters that would become the Duncans. King Features, already distributing Baby Blues and Borgman's editorial cartoons, began running the new comic strip in 1997 with Scott writing and Borgman drawing.

Charles Schulz liked the new strip, but added, "Zits is the worst name for a comic strip since Peanuts." Said quote would later be printed on the back of the compilation book Humongous Zits, along with a ripped-out piece of paper with multiple different names considered (such as Jeremy, Yo., and My So-Called Life and Stuff), with Zits circled last as the final choice.

To create each installment, Jerry Scott comes up with an idea and then writes and sketches a fully scripted layout, which Jim Borgman draws finished art for, occasionally embellishing or replacing Scott's layouts if he feels he can make the strip's visual more lively.

== Main characters ==
=== Jeremy Duncan ===
Jeremy Michael Duncan is an intelligent, 17-year-old high school junior (earlier a 15-year-old freshman) who aspires to be a rock musician. He is named after Jeremy Clyde of the 1960s rock duo Chad and Jeremy (although one strip shows his parents named him after a lyric in "Joy to the World" by Three Dog Night, "Jeremiah was a bullfrog") and was once mentioned to have an older brother named Chad, who is away in college. Jeremy spends much of his time with his friends and trying to impress love interest and part-time girlfriend, Sara Toomey. Jeremy was once told by his mother he was conceived to the Led Zeppelin song "Stairway to Heaven". When not at school or with his friends, Jeremy is often embarrassed and/or lectured by his parents, Walt and Connie Duncan.

He is shown as having an ability to tell who is calling on the telephone and for what reason when it rings (sometimes even before it rings).

He usually wears his purple shirt over a black T-shirt, blue jeans, and fat tongued Sneakers. He is extremely tall, even when slouching. Jeremy spent time restoring a 1962 Volkswagen Type 2 van with his best friend Hector Garcia, which they hoped to drive across the country when they turned 16. The van was in running condition but did not run very well considering its age. In the spring of 2023, the van was flattened by a speeding garbage truck. Jeremy barely fits in the replacement car his half of the insurance money bought him. Jeremy is also the lead singer and guitarist of his garage band, which goes by many names including "Chickenfist", "Goat Cheese Pizza", "Jughead's Hat", and "Angry Dwarfs". In May 2017, his band received their first business engagement, a 6-year-old's birthday party. In July 2017 the band had their first "adult" engagement at the Arthur C. Coachella Senior Citizen Center, where the geriatric audience gave them a much better reception, with them constantly shouting "Turn It Up!". After the band debuted in a Battle of the Bands competition, Jeremy received his first kiss from Sara and the relationship took off. Since then, Jeremy and Sara have gone through many arguments, breakups and reconciliations. For all of Jeremy's flaws, however, he retains a high sense of morality and integrity as can be seen in the story arc where he steals a signpost with his name on it, only to return it to the police to free himself of the guilt he feels (although he uses Hector's name when turning it over). On another occasion, Jeremy is overwhelmed by a school essay he has to write and all the other commitments he has made. A fellow student, Phoebe, suggests he use a website to pull a bootleg essay off the Internet. In the end, however, Jeremy's sense of ethics overcomes the desire to plagiarize, and he spends the night writing the essay himself. In late 2000s strips, Jeremy received his learners' permit. In September 2007 strips, Jeremy's mother refers to his being a sophomore in high school. As of 2009 strips, Jeremy is claimed to be 16. On the August 23, 2009 strip, his driver's license was shown.

Running gags in the strip include depictions of Jeremy's room as being so messy that Connie has to dig a tunnel to reach him, his height and growth spurts, and his ability to consume vast quantities of food in seconds (either by literally inhaling or shoveling it in; one strip even showed him unhinging his jaw to eat a large sandwich). Whenever the telephone rings, he knows instantly who it is.

=== Connie Duncan ===
Connie Duncan is Jeremy's mother, born about 1955. She is a child psychologist, but works only part-time after Jeremy's birth, and her profession is rarely mentioned except in early strips. On January 20, 2025, Connie found out she got a job as counselor at Jeremy's school. She is also an aspiring writer, having begun work on a book titled: Coping Effectively with Your Teen. Jeremy constantly interrupts her work with menial requests or by being too loud and she has yet to even finish the first chapter. Besides being the family homemaker, Connie acts the disciplinarian for Jeremy. She is frequently seen waking him up for school, berating him for not following directions, and driving him to various destinations. Though Jeremy does not share much with his parents, Connie is always more than willing to listen to him. She describes a conversation with him as "coaxing a smile out of a clam full of Botox". In the strip, she is portrayed a few times as a forgetful airhead.

While Connie means well for Jeremy, she has the tendency to be over-controlling. She consistently reads personal items in Jeremy's room, gets upset when Jeremy makes any hint of wanting more privacy, and wants to do everything for him (except homework, which neither of his parents can do).

=== Walter "Walt" Duncan ===
Walt Duncan is Jeremy's father, an orthodontist who, like Connie, finds it almost impossible to hold a conversation with his son. Walt is portrayed as clueless and old-fashioned about technology, especially computers and video players. Despite Jeremy's attempts to explain how to use devices, Walt is unable to comprehend even the most basic functions. Walt is shown as having problems with math, as all he knows is the Pythagorean theorem. He has been shown to think that a fan belt is part of a search engine and that "Googling" somebody means having sexual intercourse with them. His interactions with Jeremy's peers cause intense embarrassment for his son, as Walt makes comments such as "What's up, dood [sic]?", not knowing the meaning behind them. He is the designated clothes launderer, often getting into arguments with Jeremy over notes in pockets, socks inside-out, and other pet peeves. Overweight and balding, Walt wears oversized blue pants, a plain white T-shirt, black vest, and combover (Jeremy has commented that this makes him look like a Wal-Mart greeter). Walt occasionally reveals memories that attest to a wilder youth, but most of these anecdotes are nonsense. According to Connie, his army jacket which "holds awful memories" was picked up by Walt at a thrift shop on a day when "the traffic was terrible", left Woodstock to paint his aunt's house when it began to rain, and when dating Connie, he once gave her a bong, mistaking it for a flower pot. In one instance, Walt recalls how uninhibited he felt one night at a Moby Grape concert. This shocking recollection causes him to forbid Jeremy from attending a similar concert. Another time, Walt reveals he has had a peace sign tattoo since the late 1960s, which has expanded along with his rear end, and is described to now be the size of a stop sign.

However, at times, he has been as cool as he can be to his son, like when he got a guitar pick from one of Jeremy's favorite bands who turned out also to be orthodontists.

=== Hector Garcia ===
Hector Garcia is Jeremy's Latin best friend and is a guitarist/vocalist in Jeremy's band. The two spend a lot of their time hanging out, much of it trying to restore the VW van and dreaming about where their future road trip will take them. In practice, the two have not gotten far toward restoring the van past making it run, as the boys usually end up lying on the roof of the van, talking. Hector used to date Autumn, a militant vegetarian who refers to Jeremy as "carnivore", "predator", "vampire", and "flesh-eater" or the like whenever she sees him with meat. He has the ability to grow facial hair on command. Hector is from a Spanish-speaking family and lives with his parents, grandparents, and multiple younger siblings and is apparently Catholic. Around the same time Jeremy learned he was conceived to "Stairway to Heaven," Hector revealed he learned that when his parents conceived him, blueberry muffins were burning in the oven.

Over the course of a story arc in 2011, Hector received a complete makeover from the Posse. The makeover has stuck since, ultimately giving him a new character design.

=== Sara Toomey ===
Sara Toomey is Jeremy's on-again/off-again girlfriend. Although Jeremy thinks the world of her, she apparently likes Jeremy a lot, but has thought of him as a "salvageable male". Her parents are divorced and her behavior wavers between kindness and aggravation. She and Jeremy have broken up many times, but they always seem to make up sooner or later. Sara's genuine kindness and generosity is evident in one story arc where she cuts her hair short and donates her ponytail to a charity for children undergoing chemotherapy. In the January 15, 2008, strip, Jeremy revealed he did not want to date Sara exclusively anymore, but was upset when she readily accepted this change. Sara has a locker next to Jeremy in their second year. One running gag is whenever she opens the door to leave the house, the external conditions tend to be the polar opposite of how she is dressed.

=== Pierce ===
Pierce is another of Jeremy's close friends, and the drummer of Jeremy's band (after the old drummer, Y.A., quit the band) who, as his name implies, has much of his body pierced; in a 2008 storyline, Jeremy learned that when not in the presence of his friends, Pierce finds himself compelled to remove his piercings and dress like a preppy. Unlike most of Jeremy's close friends, Pierce's last name has not been revealed. He explains this early on, before realizing he has to get braces:

Pierce: "I have a stud in my tongue, posts in my lips, rings in my nose and eyebrows, and twelve earrings on each ear. I defy anyone to find a way to attach more metal to my head."
Walt: "Pierce, you need braces."

Pierce is worried by this until Walt says, "Don't think of it as getting braces... think of it as getting your smile pierced." which makes Pierce so happy, he hugs him. After he gets his braces he shows them off for a while and describes them to Jeremy like they were a work of art. In 2016, he had them removed. Additionally, he has Michelangelo's Sistine Chapel mural tattooed on the roof of his mouth.

Despite his rebellious appearance, Pierce is actually very courteous and often tries to help out, but usually fails due to his interests and ideals. He is also very caring towards his pets and toward others, which he fulfills by donating to charities. Once, when Jeremy asked him to purchase a necklace for Sara for him, Pierce bought a necklace with a pair of jeweled skulls with intertwined snakes in the eye sockets, framed by a barbed-wire heart. He has also been described as a very polite and cautious driver by Sara's mom. He began dating D'ijon after she went to see him get another stud in his tongue. Like Hector's girlfriend, Autumn, Pierce is an animal activist and environmentalist and has been known to wear tofu shoes because leather uses cow hides, rubber uses oil, and wood uses trees. A running gag in the comic features Pierce pulling the fire alarm at school. Pierce is quite naïve - in one instance his uncle "sold" Pierce T-shirts for the band with the "Goat Cheese Pizza" Logo for $100.00, when the going rate was $2.00.

== Supporting characters ==
=== Clapton ===
Clapton is an often-silent brown cat (breed unknown), adopted by the Duncans in a 2020 strip. She seems to have one eye missing, though this has not yet been explained or addressed by the strip or characters. She is shown to have many of Jeremy's traits, such as heavy sleeping; in the October 30, 2021 strip, she sleeps soundly on Pierce's drums while the latter plays, leading him to remark that Clapton "will be fine" despite the noise of the trick-or-treaters the following night.

=== Phoebe ===
Phoebe is one of Jeremy's classmates and is presented as a hyperbolic overachiever, using any means necessary to excel academically and enter a "high-power college". She also consumes massive amounts of caffeine and has an espresso machine in her locker, which annoys almost everyone. She is constantly padding her college resume. Sadly, Phoebe is so obsessed with success that she has no sense of right and wrong, and will do nearly anything dishonest to get ahead, such as downloading bootleg reports off the Internet. (Jeremy did not take her suggestion to do so, and she got caught.) She has no pupils in her eyes, which she claims is due to selling her soul for a 4.3 GPA.

=== D'ijon ===
D'ijon is an African-American student at Jeremy's high school. She is Pierce's girlfriend and one of Sara's friends. She has dreadlocks, a copy of Edvard Munch's The Scream tattooed on her tongue and occasionally wanders around with Pierce after connecting their respective earrings. Her real name is Dionne; apparently, she started doing the "apostrophe thing" in 7th grade.

=== Autumn ===
Autumn is Hector's ex-girlfriend and a strict vegetarian, whose social graces are as lacking as her personal hygiene (she appears to have more hair under her arms than on her head). She is noted for her extreme liberal and environmentalist political actions such as freeing 50,000 live crickets in the school to spare them from dissection (this only led to them being killed by the school being sprayed by an exterminator.) Autumn despises Jeremy and has called him "flesh eater", "vampire", "murderer" and "cannibal" for eating meat.

=== Brittany ===
Brittany is another of Jeremy's classmates and is the information pipeline for the sophomore class. She has the "great gift" of being able to critique the shortcomings of others. Despite her negativity, Jeremy has several times sought her advice. In one story arc, while she is advising Jeremy about a Christmas present for Sara, she says she is lucky to be Jewish.

=== Timothy "Tim" Olsen ===
Tim Olsen is a shy, moody classmate of Jeremy's and the bassist of the band. His mother had breast cancer, and thinking the chemotherapy would make her hair fall out (thus Tim's shaved head), Jeremy and Hector shaved their heads as a token of empathy and comfort. It was not until afterward that they discovered she still had all her hair.

=== The Posse ===
The Posse is a trio of vapid girls: Zuma, Redondo and LaJolla. The three have reportedly been "best friends forever" and "share the same taste in fashion... finishing each other's sentences." All three girls are named after beaches in California. Zuma is portrayed in one comic as one very obsessed with her makeup and clothes, even going so far as to change her Social Security number so it is "cuter"; this extends to all of the girls to an extent, however, as they were once "held hostage by their hair" when they were supposed to have been helping Jeremy with a biology lab project. The Posse has the ability to outsource their emotions to each other.

=== Richandamy ===
"Richandamy", as their classmates have nicknamed them, are boyfriend and girlfriend Rich and Amy who are generally seen in a constant, intertwined hug. One is rarely seen without the other, except for bathroom situations. They hug so hard that they can feel each other's pores and even undergo cellular mitosis. Their embrace is fodder for much disgust and ridicule among their classmates, triggering many cynical comments. They broke up briefly in November 2006, and Rich was shown to have his arms locked in a "permahug" even without Amy in them. Richandamy were based on a couple who Jim Borgman knew in college.

== Guest appearances ==
=== Chad Duncan ===
Chad Duncan is Jeremy's older brother by four years. He attends college and is an overachiever and the object of much jealousy by Jeremy. In his first few appearances, Chad was said to be the perfect child, having his face slightly obscured, and having a more muscular build. He was later re-drawn as looking like an older version of Jeremy with a goatee. Chad is an occasional character and rarely appears, typically showing up during every holiday season and leaving abruptly. In one strip, he told Jeremy he had been there for two weeks already. After Jeremy said he needed to pay more attention, Chad replied, "That's what I keep telling your sister." Chad is a business major, "with a minor in uncommunication", according to Walt, as he almost never calls home.

=== Viral ===
Viral is another of Jeremy's classmates and friends. Viral is an over-achiever, tending to do many things at once (being class president, captain of the JV volleyball team, as well as many other activities) or better than normally expected. It has been revealed that Jeremy has a slight crush on her, although he is still faithful to Sara. Viral is a bit like Phoebe (for example, Viral also has a GPA above 4.0) but much more principled, and outgoing, and is energetic without a caffeine addiction. Viral also has been perceived as a perfectionist, as well as attentive. Viral first appeared in the comic strip on November 7, 2007. It is possible that Viral may have been Jeremy's girlfriend for a time (or someone introduced for a future love triangle with Sara; indeed, her name is an anagram for 'RIVAL')—during the story arc where Jeremy is caught driving past Viral's house 63 times (of which Pierce is so proud that he breaks down crying), the Judge references Viral as Jeremy's girlfriend, and Jeremy does not deny it. She began to appear less in the months after this story arc, and since then, seems to have been dropped from the strip.

=== Becker ===
Becker, or Rebecca, is a fast-paced girl who is Jeremy's love interest starting in 2008 strips. They first meet in the coffee shop, where she added her phone number to Jeremy's cell phone and talked to him (never letting Jeremy get in a word edgewise) followed by a kiss that makes Jeremy infatuated with her. However, Becker has not appeared in the strip since this story arc, save for a brief mention in the September 7, 2008 strip.

=== Albert Tang ===
Albert Tang is another classmate of Jeremy's, first appearing in a strip that was centered around Jeremy's birthday. They had both been in class when the teacher mentioned someone's birthday was coming soon. Jeremy dreads that the teacher will mention his. When the teacher goes on to tell the class about Albert's instead, Jeremy exclaims "Hey, what about me?!" He returned to the strip in December 2008, asking Sara to the high school's winter formal. He used a rose and love note while Jeremy dressed up in a gorilla suit. Sara picked Albert. He was also mentioned in December 2010 when Pierce decoded a mumbled message from Jeremy about him studying the wrong chapter for a test. Jeremy was both sorry and amused at this.

=== Billy ===
Billy is one of Jeremy's classmates; they are distant friends. Billy is openly gay, although this is only mentioned in a small number of strips. Billy once participated in a poker game with Jeremy and a few of their other peers from school.

=== Guidance counselor ===
The guidance counselor at Jeremy's high school is a blond woman whose words and advice to Jeremy are often not heard because Jeremy's mind is lost in erotic fantasies about her, whenever he is in her presence.

== Recognition and future developments ==
Zits runs in over 1,500 newspapers worldwide. Writer Jerry Scott received the National Cartoonists Society (NCS) Reuben Award in 2001. The strip itself has been translated into at least ten languages, including German, Chinese, Dutch, Spanish, Portuguese, Finnish, Norwegian, Swedish and Estonian. Additionally, both Scott and Jim Borgman received the NCS Award for Best Newspaper Comic Strip two years running, as well as the Max & Moritz Medal for Best International Comic. As of 2009, the creators portray Jeremy as a 16-year-old, and say this will probably not change. Borgman comments that the strip is inexorably built around the humorous tension of Jeremy living under his parents' rules and that, without this tension, the strip would cease to be humorous. There is some disagreement among them, however, as to how deep the characters should develop. Borgman would like the series to tackle complicated issues such as AIDS, drugs, and premarital sex, while Scott prefers not to "see the 6 o'clock news...on the funny pages."

== Books ==
Zits comic strips are collected in two formats. The first is as a Zits Sketchbook and these are numbered sequentially. They contain approximately one year of collected Zits strips. The second format is as a Zits Treasury. This format combines the material from the two previous "sketchbooks". After sketchbook #15 was published in 2012, this format was dropped, and since then only treasuries have been published. In 2013, Scott and Borgman created an illustrated novel entitled "Zits: Chillax" based on their comic strip.

=== Sketchbooks ===
Title	Publication Date	Notes	ISBN
1 Zits	September 1, 1998		ISBN 978-0-8362-6825-6
2 Growth Spurt	April 1, 1999		ISBN 978-0-8362-7848-4
3 Don't Roll Your Eyes at Me, Young Man!	September 1, 2000		ISBN 978-0-7407-1166-4
4 Are We an "Us"?	March 20, 2001		ISBN 978-0-7407-1854-0
5 Zits Unzipped	April 1, 2002		ISBN 978-0-7407-2322-3
6 Busted!	September 2, 2002		ISBN 978-0-7407-2675-0
7 Road Trip!	September 1, 2003		ISBN 978-0-7407-3814-2
8 Teenage Tales	April 1, 2004		ISBN 978-0-7407-4144-9
9 Thrashed	May 1, 2005		ISBN 978-0-7407-5117-2
10 Pimp My Lunch	October 1, 2005		ISBN 978-0-7407-5443-2
11 Are We Out of the Driveway Yet?	September 1, 2006		ISBN 978-0-7407-6199-7
12 Rude, Crude, and Tattooed	April 1, 2007		ISBN 978-0-7407-6357-1
13 You're Making That Face Again	October 19, 2010		ISBN 978-0-7407-9734-7
14 Drive!	March 15, 2011		ISBN 978-1-4494-0107-8
15 Zombie Parents	March 13, 2012		ISBN 978-1-4494-0973-9
Pierced: A Zits Close-Up	October 21, 2008	Selected Strips	ISBN 978-0-7407-7741-7
Lust and Other Uses for Spare Hormones: A Zits Look At Relationships	October 20, 2009	Selected Strips	ISBN 978-0-7407-8544-3
A Zits Guide to Living With Your Teenager	April 13, 2010	Selected Strips	ISBN 978-0-7407-9168-0

=== Treasuries ===
Title	Publication Date	Books Contained	ISBN
Humongous Zits	March 1, 2000	Zits and Growth Spurt	978-0740700132
Big Honkin' Zits	August 28, 2001	Don't Roll Your Eyes at Me, Young Man! and Are We an "Us"?	978-0740713972
Zits Supersized	April 2, 2003	Zits Unzipped and Busted!	978-0740733079
Random Zits	September 1, 2004	Road Trip! and Teenage Tales	978-0740746697
Crack of Noon	March 1, 2006	Thrashed and Pimp My Lunch	978-0740756849
Alternative Zits	September 1, 2007	Are We Out of the Driveway Yet? and Rude, Crude, and Tattooed	978-0740768484
Jeremy and Mom: A Zits Retrospective You Should Definitely Buy for Your Mom	March 1, 2008	Selected Strips	978-0740771019
My Bad	March 17, 2009	None; All new material	978-0740780905
Jeremy and Dad: A Zits Tribute-ish to Fathers and Sons	April 20, 2010	Selected Strips	978-0740791550
Sunday Brunch: The Best of Zits Sundays	November 1, 2011	Selected Strips	978-1449407971
Triple Shot, Double Pump, No Whip Zits	November 6, 2012	None; All new material	978-1449423100
Zits en Concert	October 15, 2013	None; All new material	978-1449430573
Peace, Love & Wi-Fi	November 4, 2014	None; All new material	978-1449458676
Zits: Apocalypse - Are You Ready?	November 3, 2015	None; All new material	978-1449458683
Extra Cheesy Zits	November 1, 2016	None; All new material	978-1449479824
What Was That All About?: 20 Years of Strips and Stories	October 17, 2017	Selected strips, stories	978-1449486747
Dance Like Everybody's Watching!	October 16, 2018	None; All new material	978-1449495114
Not Sparking Joy	October 22, 2019	None; All new material	978-1524851767
Screentime	October 7, 2020	None; All new material	978-1524852276
Undivided Inattention	December 14, 2021	None; All new material	978-1524860691
Binge-worthy	September 27, 2022	None; All new material	978-1524875640
Midnight Snack	September 26, 2023	None; All new material	978-1524881313
Current Mood	September 17, 2024	None; All new material	978-1524887803
Movie Night	September 24, 2025	None; All new material	978-1524890421
Blowing up!	September 29, 2026	None; All new material	979-8881616441

=== Novels ===
Title	Publication date	ISBN
Zits: Chillax	21 May 2013	ISBN 978-0-0622-2851-2
Zits: Shredded	18 February 2014	ISBN 978-0-0622-2853-6

== See also ==
- Aggie Mack
- Etta Kett
- Freckles and His Friends
- Marty Links
- Penny
- Harold Teen
