= Barenaked Ladies Are Men =

Studio album by Barenaked Ladies
- Released: February 6, 2007
- Recorded: October 2005–April 2006
- Genre: Alternative rock
- Length: 60:11
- Label: Desperation
- Producer: Barenaked Ladies

Barenaked Ladies chronology
Extended Versions (2006)	Barenaked Ladies Are Men (2007)	Talk to the Hand: Live in Michigan (2007)

Professional ratings
Review scores
Source	Rating
AllMusic	4/5 stars
Popmatters	3/10 stars

Barenaked Ladies Are Men (sometimes abbreviated BLAMen or Are Men) is the eighth full-length original-material studio album by Barenaked Ladies, and the second release of material from the 29-song session that bore the companion album Barenaked Ladies Are Me. The two albums (or at least their material) were released together under the Are Me title in several "deluxe" release methods before Are Men received its own proper official release in February 2007. In this way, Are Me and Are Men together may be considered the band's seventh full-length original-material studio album. The album's artwork was created by Team Macho who also did similar artwork for the Are Me releases. The title is an extension of the Are Me title. During touring for the two albums, a pre-show video showed an unidentified hand adding various other extensions to the Barenaked Ladies Are Me title.

The formal release of the album is an Enhanced CD, and contains software and individual tracks that allow the owner to remix three of the band's songs. An advanced release of the album, exclusive to Canadian Starbucks, was released on October 3, 2006. This version lacked the Enhanced CD feature, as well as final four tracks, which at the time were deemed "bonus tracks" for the Are Me release, both in its single-album form, and its 25-track deluxe form. The Starbucks version, however, included the two singles at the time from Are Me.

Upon its release, Barenaked Ladies Are Men reached No. 102 in the US and No. 39 in the band's native Canada.

Are Men is the second full-length release by the Barenaked Ladies on their own record label, and is the band's final non-themed studio album to feature Steven Page before his departure from the band in 2009.

== Critical reception ==
AllMusic called the album "just a bit more energized" than its companion album, saying it had "just a bit more wit, sparkle, and pop." They also stated that Are Men had more memorable hooks than Are Me and that, when viewed together with Are Me, "Barenaked Ladies Are Me and Barenaked Ladies Are Men should not only stand as a creative high point for the Canadian rockers, but a truly superb would-be double-album." The album was given a 4 out of 5 stars score by AllMusic reviewer Matt Collar.

Hybrid Magazine, however, called the release a "largely a by-the-books, forgettable Barenaked Ladies album that rarely recalls the more accomplished work in the band's back catalog." They disliked Steven Page's vocals, saying that without them the album lacked an "emotional undercurrent", and that even when Page is at his best on the album, the compositions seem "mechanical". Hybrid finished by describing the album as "the sound of a group of musicians having fun and enjoying their time out of the limelight."

== Track listing ==
All tracks are written by Steven Page and Ed Robertson, except where noted.

Barenaked Ladies Are Men track listing
No.	Title	Writer(s)	Lead vocals	Length
1.	"Serendipity"	Kevin Hearn	Kevin Hearn	4:12
2.	"Something You'll Never Find"		Steven Page	4:57
3.	"One and Only"	Ed Robertson	Ed Robertson	3:48
4.	"Angry People"		Steven Page	4:02
5.	"Down to Earth"		Ed Robertson	3:47
6.	"Beautiful"		Steven Page; Ed Robertson	2:36
7.	"Running Out of Ink"		Steven Page	3:59
8.	"Half a Heart"		Ed Robertson	4:28
9.	"Maybe Not"		Ed Robertson	3:01
10.	"I Can I Will I Do"		Steven Page	3:09
11.	"Fun & Games"		Ed Robertson	3:46
12.	"The New Sad"		Steven Page	2:33
13.	"Quality"		Ed Robertson	4:16
14.	"Another Spin"	Kevin Hearn	Kevin Hearn	4:05
15.	"What a Letdown"	Ed Robertson	Ed Robertson	3:50
16.	"Why Say Anything Nice?"	Steven Page; Ed Robertson; Tyler Stewart	Steven Page	3:43

== Personnel ==
=== Musicians ===
==== Barenaked Ladies ====
- Steven Page – vocals, guitars
- Ed Robertson – vocals, guitars
- Jim Creeggan – bass, vocals
- Tyler Stewart – drums, percussion
- Kevin Hearn – keyboards, piano, vocals

==== Additional personnel ====
- Rob Carli – clarinet, saxophones (including a tenor), horn arrangements
- Terry Promane – trombone
- Kevin Turcotte – trumpet

=== Production ===
- Jim Creeggan, Paul Forgues, Kevin Hearn, and Susan Rogers – engineers
- Keith Rudyk – assistant engineer
- Bob Clearmountain – mixing
- Bob Ludwig – mastering

== Charts ==
Chart performance for Barenaked Ladies Are Men
Chart (2000)	Peak position
US Billboard 200	102
