= Jim Borgman =

American cartoonist (born 1954)

- Born: February 24, 1954 (age 72) Cincinnati, Ohio, U.S.
- Notable works: Editorial cartoonist for The Cincinnati Enquirer (1976– 2008); Zits
- Awards: Pulitzer Prize for Editorial Cartooning (1991); National Cartoonist Society awards (1986, 1987, 1988, 1993, 1994, 1997, 1998, 1999, 2006)
- Spouses: Lynn Goodwin (died 1999) Suzanne Soled (m. 2003)

James Mark Borgman (born February 24, 1954) is an American cartoonist. He is known for his political cartoons and his nationally syndicated comic strip Zits. He was the editorial cartoonist at The Cincinnati Enquirer from 1976 to 2008.

== Early life and education ==
Borgman was born in Cincinnati, Ohio to James and Marian Borgman, where he began his career in journalism as a student at Elder High School. He then attended Ohio's Kenyon College where he started as an English major, then switched to being an art major. He graduated in 1976 with Phi Beta Kappa honors.

== Personal life ==
Borgman met his first wife Lynn Goodwin during his senior year of college at a class called "Jesus and the Gospels". They had two children named Dylan and Chelsea. Lynn died in 1999 from a blood clot following surgery to ease chronic neck and shoulder pain. In 2003, Borgman married Suzanne Soled, an educational psychologist and professor at Northern Kentucky University.

== Career ==
At Kenyon College, Borgman drew editorial cartoons for the Kenyon Collegian.

He became The Cincinnati Enquirer's editorial cartoonist in 1976. Since 1980, his editorial cartoons have been nationally syndicated, at first by King Features Syndicate. In 2007, Universal Press Syndicate took over the distribution of his editorial cartoons. In 2008, he took a voluntary buyout offered by Enquirer parent Gannett Company but continued to work on Zits after leaving the paper.

== Comic strip series ==
=== Wonk City ===
His body of work has included the weekly comic strip Wonk City, which ran from 1994 to 1996 on the editorial pages of The Washington Post. A surreal send-up of inside-the-beltway mores during the administration of Bill Clinton, many of the cartoons featured a cat involved in behind-the-scenes political skullduggery.

=== Zits ===
While on vacation in Sedona, Arizona, Borgman met up with fellow cartoonist Jerry Scott. Scott pitched the idea of a cartoon about a teenager and thus the comic strip Zits was born, debuting in July, 1997, with Borgman drawing and Scott writing.

Zits is syndicated in over 1500 newspapers around the world and has been translated into nine languages, including German, Chinese, Swedish, Norwegian, Danish, Spanish, Dutch, Portuguese, Finnish and Polish.

== Awards ==
In 1991, when Borgman was 37 years old, he won the Pulitzer Prize for Editorial Cartooning. He has also won the National Cartoonist Society Editorial Cartoon Award for 1986, 1987, 1988, 1994, and 2006, their Newspaper Comic Strip for 1997, their Newspaper Comic Strip (with Jerry Scott) in 1998 and 1999 for Zits, and their Reuben Award in 1993.

Borgman also won the Reuben Award for editorial cartooning in 2006, and has achieved a great deal of recognition for his work.
