= List of fictional United States Republicans =

The following is a list of fictional characters who have associated with the Republican Party of the United States. The list can include television characters, film characters, literature characters, or fictional characters from any other medium.

== Characters identified as Republican ==
The following is a list of people who have been described with the term Republican or who identify with the Republican Party. This section is only intended for fictional characters who explicitly identify as Republicans.

=== Film ===
- The Ringo Kid from Stagecoach is a Republican.
- Senator Edward H. "Big Ed" Jones from Wilson is a Republican.
- District Attorney Thomas Mara from Miracle on 34th Street is identified as a Republican by the judge.
- Grant Matthews from State of the Union is a Republican.
- Lance from Long Shot identifies as a conservative Republican.
- Abel Turner from Lakeview Terrace is a Republican.
- Colonel Mustard from Clue is a Republican.

=== Television ===
- Nucky Thompson from Boardwalk Empire holds the Atlantic County treasurer's office as a Republican and works extensivly with the Republican party during the 1920 election
- Lindsay Bluth from Arrested Development runs for office as a Republican.
- Ferguson from Clarissa Explains it all identifies as a Young Republican.
- April from Teenage Bounty Hunters mentions she is a Young Republican.
- Ken Olson from Dexter mentions he voted for George W. Bush twice.
- Carlton Banks from The Fresh Prince of Bel-Air — It is stated numerous times in the series that he is a Republican.
- Philip Banks from The Fresh Prince of Bel-Air — In the episode "Breaking Up Is Hard to Do," Philip is consulted by the Republicans for a Better Life to run for political office. In the episode "P.S. I Love You," Philip states he is pro-choice.
- Conrad Bennish, Jr. from Sliders — In the episode "Summer of Love", Conrad Bennish introduced himself as a young Republican for the war.
- Lucille Bluth from Arrested Development: Owns a "Bush/Cheney 2000" sweater
- Assistant District Attorney Alexandra Borgia from Law & Order
- DA Arthur Branch from Law & Order
- Matthew Brock from NewsRadio — In one episode, Bill McNeal refers to Matthew as a "lifelong Republican."
- Archie Bunker from All in the Family — In an episode in the fall of 1974, Archie endorses Republican candidate George Jefferson and Archie states that he is the only Republican in the household.
- Matt Camden from 7th Heaven identifies himself as a Republican in Season 6, when getting to know future wife, and Democrat, Sarah Glass.
- Denny Crane from Boston Legal
- Marcy D'Arcy from Married... with Children She says, "That's why I'm a Republican!" after Al Bundy wins a National Endowment for the Arts film contest.
- Elliot Reid from Scrubs: to J.D. "You didn't tell them I was a Republican, did you?"
- Abbie Carmichael from Law & Order
- Jack Donaghy and Tracy Jordan on 30 Rock
- Several characters on The West Wing, including Ainsley Hayes and Arnold Vinick.
- Sam Dracula (usually called Grandpa) on The Munsters – In the episode "A Visit from Johann", Herman called Sam Dracula a Republican.
- Hal Gardner from 24 served as vice president under Republican president Charles Logan
- Defense Secretary James Heller from 24 serves as Secretary of Defense under Republican presidents Keeler and Logan
- Thurston Howell, III, from Gilligan's Island — In one episode when Mary Ann mentions Washington D.C., Howell responds by angrily stating "I'm a Republican! No one would ever find me there!"
- Alex P. Keaton from Family Ties – Has a picture of Richard Nixon in his bedroom and backed both Ronald Reagan and George H. W. Bush. It is stated numerous times in the series that he is a Republican.
- John Keeler from 24 ran for President as a Republican.
- George Jefferson from All in the Family and The Jeffersons, runs for local office as a Republican, and seeks and gets Archie Bunker's political support.
- Nadia Yassir from 24 is a registered Republican.
- Ana Torres from Grown-ish, despite supporting Obama, is a Republican.
- Marilyn Sudor from Boston Public — In the episode "Chapter Seventy-Eight" Marilyn Sudor answered "yes" in response to Stephen Harper's question of if she was a Republican.
- Nathan Templeton from Commander in Chief
- Bree Van de Kamp from Desperate Housewives — Met husband Rex at a Young Republicans meeting at college.
- Ted Schmidt from Queer as Folk stated he was a Republican in a third-season episode
- Major Frank Burns from M*A*S*H — An admirer of Republican Senator Joseph McCarthy
- Major Charles Winchester from M*A*S*H. He and his filthy rich family despised Democratic presidents such as Franklin D. Roosevelt and Harry S. Truman. In an early attempt to get a transfer, he admitted that his father personally knew Truman (despite disliking him). A few seasons later he expressed anguish over having endured four FDR elections. Also, Major Winchester told a Congressional aide "I am so conservative that I make you look like a New Dealer".
- Howard Cunningham on Happy Days
- Log Cabin Republican on Freak Show
- Darrin Tyler and his daughter Sharon Tyler on Wonderfalls attend a local Republican party gathering together in the "Barrel Bear" episode.
- Charlotte York from Sex and the City — Was a member of the Young Republicans in college.
- Kirsten Cohen from The O.C. – In "The Case of the Franks" episode flashback, Sandy asks her if she is a Republican and she nods her head.
- Herb Tarlek from WKRP in Cincinnati
- Maxwell Sheffield from The Nanny
- Tobias Fünke from Arrested Development is seen wearing a shirt that reads Bush/Cheney 2000.
- Judge Atallah Sims from 100 Centre Street
- Leon Carp on Roseanne. In the episode "December Bride", Leon tells Roseanne "I hate to shop! I am absolutely insensitive. I detest Barbra Streisand. And for God's sake, I'm a Republican!"
- Dr. Arthur Harmon on Maude
- Mr. Kraft on Sabrina the Teenage Witch says in the episode "Finger Lickin' Flu": "And that's why I'm a Republican" when Sabrina has fun with the magic lollipop he has sucked which will make him believe everything he is told by claiming that then-President Bill Clinton insulted him on television.
- Harold Weir and Cindy Sanders on Freaks and Geeks
- Lisa Hayes on Diff'rent Strokes.
- Zeb Colter and Jack Swagger in WWE were members of the Tea Party movement.
- John Casey from the Chuck
- Schmidt from New Girl
- Detective Odafin Tutuola from Law & Order: SVU is identified as a Republican.
- Mike Baxter from Last Man Standing whose politically conservative views are a main focus-point on the show.
- Lawson from Breaking Bad and Better Call Saul supports stand-your-ground laws considering them to be a moral right.
- Tommy Tomas from Mr. Mayor worked for the RNC and for Senator Lindsey Graham, and expressed approval for Ronald Reagan.
- Beverley Leslie from Will & Grace hosted events for the Republican Party.
- Jim McAllister from Young Sheldon expresses dismay that his brother is a Democrat, his wife and George Cooper Sr. and Mary Cooper all agree this is unfortunate, suggesting that both families are Republicans.
- Connie "Meemaw" from Young Sheldon and The Big Bang Theory mocks California as "the left coast" and "the land of fruits and nuts." She shows similar derision to Massachusetts.
- The Turnbow parents in Stranger Things are Republicans. The mother comments in one episode when her daughter answers the door to "be nice, unless it's a Mormon. Or a Democrat."
- Mike Rostenkowski (Bernadette's father) from The Big Bang Theory is mentioned by Bernadette to hate a number of things especially gun control and Jimmy Carter.

==== Animation ====
- Yancy Fry, Sr., father of Philip J. Fry, was a staunch Republican and demonstrated strong respect for Richard Nixon when meeting him in "Game of Tones" (albeit within Fry's own mind, although he'd know his father's political beliefs). Fry himself expressed brief support of Nixon as well during his 3012 reelection campaign, though he was subsequently admonished by Leela and attended Nixon's opponent's election night rally by the end of the episode.
- Stephen Stotch, Linda Stotch, Mr. Mackey (despite opposing the Iraq War in 2003), Mr. Garrison, Principal Victoria, and Butters Stotch all supported Sen. John McCain's presidential campaign in 2008 in the South Park episode "About Last Night". Garrison also ran for president as a Republican in 2016 with Caitlyn Jenner as his running mate and defeated Hillary Clinton in the general election with him serving as a parody of Donald Trump.
- Ike Broflovski cried upon hearing about McCain's loss in 2008 election in the episode "About Last Night...". He also cried upon learning Mitt Romney failed to unseat Barack Obama in 2012 in the episode "Obama Wins!".
- Franklin Sherman from The Critic — Gave "millions to the Republicans for years" (then asked to be "Secretary of Balloon Doggies") and possibly served as a GOP Governor of New York.
- Duke Philips from The Critic — Decides to run for President as a Republican in 1996 until Bob Dole blackmails him.
- Frank Murphy from F Is for Family — In the episode "The Liar's Club", Frank complains about "those pansies giving Nixon the shaft".
- "Dad" from Dexter's Laboratory. Mandark's father calls him a Republican during a conversation.
- Ned Flanders from The Simpsons — In the episode "Home Away from Homer", Ned says, "I wish we lived in the America of yesteryear that only exists in the brains of us Republicans."
- Krusty the Clown from The Simpsons — ran for the House of Representatives as a Republican.
- Sideshow Bob Terwilliger from The Simpsons — ran for mayor of Springfield as a Republican.
- Mr. Burns from The Simpsons is shown in several episodes as Chairman of the Springfield Republican Party meetings and ran for governor as a Republican.
- Carter Pewterschmidt from Family Guy
- Stan Smith and Greg Corbin from American Dad!
- Uncle Ruckus from The Boondocks.
- Gus Baker on Beavis & Butthead
- Clay Puppington on Moral Orel
- Master Shake from Aqua Teen Hunger Force expresses approval for the President (at the time George W. Bush) in the episode "Carl Wash".

=== Video games ===
- Hurk Drubman Sr. from Far Cry 5 is a candidate for Montana Senate and quest-giver, who assigns you the task of retrieving his campaign truck named after former first lady Nancy Reagan.
- Derby Harrington from Bully

=== Print ===
- Carmen from Prickly City
- Mallard Fillmore from Mallard Fillmore
- Bucky Katt from Get Fuzzy was a supporter of Mitt Romney during 2012, which Rob states Bucky supports because of Mitt Romney cruelty to his dog. Because of Bucky being rude and dumb he is supposed to be a satire to conservatives.
- Rat from Pearls Before Swine once was a folk singer for the far right and wrote a song for pro-oil spills called 'Maybe Your Ducky Likes Swimming In The Mucky'. Rat also considers 'liberal' as an insult. Like Bucky, Rat is supposed to spoof Republicans.
- Dogbert from Dilbert
- Mary Marvel told then President Bill Clinton that she was raised in a Republican household

=== Theater ===
- Rod from Avenue Q claims a "friend" he is describing (actually himself) is a Republican
- Mr. Warbucks from Annie is identified as a Republican several times, notably by President Franklin Delano Roosevelt

== Characters who endorsed a Republican candidate ==
=== Television ===
- Gale Boetticher from Breaking Bad and Better Call Saul has a bumper sticker for Ron Paul on his car and a Ron Paul sticker on his notebook. He describes himself as "a libertarian."
- Woody Johnson on Brickleberry endorsed John McCain-Sarah Palin in 2008, and openly expressed his disapproval of Barack Obama and Al Gore.
- Don Draper on Mad Men supported Richard Nixon in 1960
- Hank Hill on King of the Hill voted for Ronald Reagan in 1980 and 1984, for Bob Dole in 1996 and (reluctantly) for George W. Bush in 2000. He also expressed dissatisfaction with Bill Clinton on several occasions, preferring Dale Earnhardt be put on a stamp over him.
- George Mason from 24 opposed Democratic Senator David Palmer's attempt to become President of the United States
- Spinner Mason from Degrassi: The Next Generation amidst school tension expresses admiration of George W. Bush and Rudy Giuliani as leaders who "take names and kick butt".
- Nathan Ramsey from Seven Days – In the episode "Stairway to Heaven", when Ramsey said, "He's the best friend a man could ever have" Frank Parker said, "He's not going off on George W. again."
- Master Shake on the Aqua Teen Hunger Force expressed approval for the President (at the time George W. Bush) in the episode Carl Wash.
- Tony Soprano on The Sopranos voted for George W. Bush in 2004.
- Carmela Soprano on The Sopranos voted for George W. Bush in 2004.
- Lucille Bluth on Arrested Development owns a Bush/Cheney 2000 sweater.
- Officer Thomas "Tom" Hanson, Jr from 21 Jump Street said he supported the Republicans.
- Red Forman from That '70s Show – Forced his son Eric Forman to say "Nixon was framed and Kennedy was a commie." In another episode, Red said, "You know who I like?" and Eric responded by saying "Nixon?" However, even though Red endorsed Nixon in those episodes, in the episode "Streaking", Red was angry at Gerald Ford and said to him at Ford's rally, "How the hell could you pardon Nixon?"
- Arthur Fonzarelli on Happy Days gave a campaign speech for President Dwight D. Eisenhower in 1956.
- Howard Cunningham on Happy Days voted for Dwight D. Eisenhower in 1952 and in 1956.
- Marshal Matt Dillon from Gunsmoke was appointed U.S. Marshal for Dodge City by President Ulysses S. Grant.
- Ike Broflovski on South Park backed John McCain in 2008 and Mitt Romney in 2012 and cried after they both lost to Barack Obama.
- Roseanne Conner from Roseanne voted for Donald Trump in 2016.
- Karen and Ted Wheeler from Stranger Things have a Reagan Bush '84 sign in their yard.
- Erica Sinclair from Stranger Things, endorsed lassiez-faire capitalism.
- Sue Sylvester from Glee, in the episode "The Hurt Locker, Part Two" there is a flashback to multiple different times when Sue was rooting for the Republican presidential candidate, ending in despair each time they lost. She also became the Vice President of the United States in 2016 with her running mate, Jed Bush, a parody of Jeb Bush.
- Emery Huang from Fresh Off the Boat supported Bob Dole in 1996.

==== The Simpsons ====
- Abraham Simpson owns a Keep cool with Coolidge poster which was President Calvin Coolidge's campaign slogan in 1924.
- Bumblebee Man worked as a Spanish translator for Krusty the Clown during his campaign for the United States House of Representatives.
- Rainier Wolfcastle frequently attends meetings of the Springfield Republican Party, a logical step as he is based loosely on Arnold Schwarzenegger.
- Julius Hibbert also attends meetings of the Springfield Republican Party.
- Lenny Leonard voted for Bob Dole in 1996.

=== Film ===
- Annie Wilkes from Misery has a pennant reading "Elect Nixon" in her scrapbook.
- Radio from The Brave Little Toaster regularly states he is close to and an admirer of former President Theodore Roosevelt.
- Gregory Marmalard (James Daughton) in National Lampoon's Animal House became a White House aide for President Richard M. Nixon and was later incarcerated for his role in the Watergate scandal.
- Frank Wallingham (Brian Keith) in The Hallelujah Trail
- Brick Tamland (Steve Carell) in Anchorman: The Legend of Ron Burgundy became a political advisor to President George W. Bush
- Secretary of the Treasury William Cleary from Wedding Crashers is shown to be on good terms with John McCain
- Senator Thorpe (Kim Dawson) in Sex, Lies and Politics
- Senator Robert "Bob" Rumson (Richard Dreyfuss) in The American President
- Benjamin K. Arthur (Robert Riordan) in The Manchurian Candidate
- President Andrew "Andy" Boone (Kelsey Grammer) in Swing Vote
- Vanessa Wetherhold (Elliot Page) in Smart People is a member of Young Republicans
- John Fitzsimmons (William Trgoe) in The Kentucky Fried Movie
- District Attorney Thomas Mara (Jerome Cowan) in Miracle on 34th Street
- Senator Robert Kelly from X-Men is identified as a Republican in the films; his political party affiliation is not mentioned in any other related media.
- Tommy Eaton's parents have a Reagan Bush '84 sign pinned in their front lawn in Summer of 84.
- Indiana Jones in Indiana Jones and the Kingdom of the Crystal Skull, upon being asked for last words, replies "I like Ike."

=== Print ===
- Billy from The Family Circus asked his parents, Bill and Thelma to vote for Ronald Reagan in 1980 because President Jimmy Carter's press conferences kept interrupting his cartoons.

== See also ==
- List of fictional United States Democrats
