= Call and Answer =

1999 single by Barenaked Ladies

Single by Barenaked Ladies

from the album Stunt
- Released: July 12, 1999
- Length: 5:48 (album); 4:09 (radio mix)
- Label: Reprise
- Songwriters: Steven Page; Stephen Duffy
- Producers: Barenaked Ladies; David Leonard; Susan Rogers

Barenaked Ladies singles chronology
"It's All Been Done" (1998)	"Call and Answer" (1999)	"Get in Line" (1999)

Music video
- "Call and Answer" on YouTube

"Call and Answer" is a song by Canadian musical group Barenaked Ladies. It was the third single from their 1998 album Stunt. For its release, the song was both remixed and edited into a radio mix that cut from the second verse to the third chorus, skipping a chorus, an instrumental break and the third verse. The remix was a slight adjustment of EQ and levels; not a comprehensive remix involving adding or replacing musical elements. This version was also included on the soundtrack for the film EdTV.

The song was written by Steven Page and his longtime collaborator, Stephen Duffy. All of the vocals in the song are performed by Page; this includes overlapping vocals, harmonies and octaves, and a call-and-response chorus. This, in addition to a long ad-lib outro makes the song a showcase of Page's vocal abilities. In live performances, the backing vocals were performed by bandmates Ed Robertson and Jim Creeggan. The song seems to be about the reconciliation of a tumultuous relationship.

The song was performed on CBC Radio as a tribute to Peter Gzowski on his death in 2002. It was also performed as a duet with Alanis Morissette in 2004 during the co-headlining Au Naturale Tour. It was the final song performed at Page's final show with Barenaked Ladies on February 5, 2009, three weeks before his departure.

== Music video ==
The video for the song utilized the shorter, radio mix version, and involved the band living in a world of duplicates. All the houses look the same, all the cars are white Volkswagen New Beetles, and there are several "copies" of each band member. Notably, there are multiple Stevens that sing the multiple vocal lines he sings on the song. Steve is the main band member seen in the video, and the other band members are only in a few shots. Steve is paired with a female character in the video. It was shot in the Valencia section of Santa Clarita, California. A second version of the video includes scenes from the film EdTV. The video was an Easter egg on the install disc for Mac OS 9-9.2, along with the video for Static X's "Push It".

== Personnel ==
- Steven Page – lead and backing vocals
- Ed Robertson – acoustic and electric guitars
- Jim Creeggan – double bass, cello
- Kevin Hearn – piano, synthesizer
- Tyler Stewart – drums, percussion

== Charts ==
=== Weekly charts ===
Chart (1999)	Peak position
Canada Adult Contemporary (RPM)	6
Canada Top Singles (RPM)	10
Scottish Singles Sales (Official Charts)	32
UK Singles (Official Charts)	52
US Bubbling Under Hot 100 (Billboard)	21
US Adult Pop Airplay (Billboard)	17

=== Year-end charts ===
Chart (1999)	Position
Canada Top Singles (RPM)	76
Canada Adult Contemporary (RPM)	42
US Adult Top 40 (Billboard)	45

== Release history ==
Region	Date	Format(s)	Label(s)	Ref.
United States	May 4, 1999	Contemporary hit radio	Reprise	
United Kingdom	July 12, 1999	CD; cassette	Reprise	
