= King of the Hill (soundtrack) =

Soundtrack album by Various artists
- Released: November 2, 1999
- Genres: Rock, country
- Label: Elektra/Fox Music

Singles from King of the Hill
- 1. "Get in Line" Released: October 1999; 2. "Move It On Over" Released: October 1999

Professional ratings
Review scores
Source	Rating
Allmusic	4/5 stars

King of the Hill is a soundtrack album to the animated Fox sitcom King of the Hill. It was released in 1999 via Elektra Records. The album includes covers of southern rock songs and original songs, performed by country and rock artists (some of which have appeared on the show). Two songs from the album were released as singles: Travis Tritt and George Thorogood's cover of Hank Williams' "Move It On Over" and Barenaked Ladies' "Get in Line". Both songs were made into music videos. Brooks & Dunn's cover of Bob Seger's "Against the Wind" also charted on the Billboard Hot Country Singles & Tracks chart at number 53 from unsolicited airplay. In addition, Faith Hill's pop remix of "Piece of My Heart" is also included on the international version of her 1998 album Faith, as well as her 2001 greatest hits compilation There You'll Be.

== Track listing ==
1. "Move It On Over" – Travis Tritt and George Thorogood
2. "Get in Line" – Barenaked Ladies
3. "Down on the Corner" – The Mavericks
4. "Straight to the Moon" – Sheryl Crow
5. "Against the Wind" – Brooks & Dunn
6. "Piece of My Heart" – Faith Hill
7. "I Know a Little" – Trace Adkins
8. "Mow Against the Grain" – The Hill Family Singers
9. "East Bound and Down" – Tonic
10. "Free Fallin'" – Deana Carter
11. "Angel Flying Too Close to the Ground" – Willie Nelson and Mark McGrath
12. "Teddy Bear" – Hank Hill
13. "El Paso" – Old 97's
14. "One Tin Soldier" – Luanne Platter (Brittany Murphy)
15. King of the Hill Theme: "Yahoos and Triangles" – The Refreshments

== Chart performance ==
Chart (1999)	Peak position
U.S. Billboard Top Country Albums	72
