= Get in Line =

1999 single by Barenaked Ladies

Single by Barenaked Ladies

from the album King of the Hill soundtrack
- Released: October 11, 1999
- Label: Elektra
- Songwriters: Steven Page, Ed Robertson, Jim Creeggan
- Producer: David Kahne

Barenaked Ladies singles chronology
"Call and Answer" (1999)	"Get in Line" (1999)	"Alcohol" (1999)

Music video
- "Get in Line" on YouTube

"Get in Line" is a song by Canadian alternative rock group Barenaked Ladies. It was released in 1999 from the soundtrack of the TV series King of the Hill. The song was released on October 11, 1999, and later appeared on the band's compilation release, Disc One: All Their Greatest Hits (1991–2001). "Get in Line" reached number 18 in Canada and number 28 on the US Billboard Adult Top 40.

The CD cover features the face of King of the Hill character Dale Gribble.

== Music video ==
The music video, the first of many of the group's videos directed by Phil Harder, features the band playing the song live action in the setting of King of the Hill. It was shot in a warehouse in Seattle.

The video for "Get in Line" is featured in Barenaked Ladies' DVD Barelaked Nadies, as well on the King of the Hill Season 1 DVD set as a special feature (Disc 3 with Dale Gribble).

== Charts ==
=== Weekly charts ===
Chart (1999–2000)	Peak position
Canada Top Singles (RPM)	18
Canada Adult Contemporary (RPM)	26
US Adult Pop Airplay (Billboard)	28

=== Year-end charts ===
Chart (2000)	Position
US Adult Top 40 (Billboard)	90

== Release history ==
Region	Date	Format(s)	Label(s)	Ref(s).
United States	October 11, 1999	Adult contemporary; hot adult contemporary; modern adult contemporary radio	Elektra	
United States	October 12, 1999	Alternative radio	Elektra	
United States	October 26, 1999	Contemporary hit radio	Elektra	
