= Stunt (album) =

Studio album by Barenaked Ladies
- Released: July 7, 1998
- Studios: Arlyn (Austin, Texas); Phase One (Scarborough, Ontario)
- Genres: Alternative rock; jangle pop; pop rock
- Length: 51:17
- Label: Reprise
- Producers: Barenaked Ladies; David Leonard; Susan Rogers

Barenaked Ladies chronology
Rock Spectacle (1996)	Stunt (1998)	Maroon (2000)

Singles from Stunt
- 1. "One Week" Released: September 15, 1998; 2. "It's All Been Done" Released: December 16, 1998; 3. "Call and Answer" Released: July 13, 1999; 4. "Alcohol" Released: 1999

Professional ratings
Review scores
Source	Rating
Allmusic	4/5 stars
Encyclopedia of Popular Music	4/5 stars
Los Angeles Times	2.5/4 stars
NME	1/10
Paste	7.4/10
Rolling Stone	2.5/5 stars
The Rolling Stone Album Guide	3.5/5 stars
Sputnikmusic	5/5 stars

Stunt is the fourth full-length studio album by Canadian alternative rock band Barenaked Ladies. Their most successful album, it entered the US charts at No. 3 and sold over 4 million units by the end of its chart run. Its first single, "One Week", became the band's breakthrough single in the US market by hitting No. 1 (selling over 5 million copies). The song also reached No. 5 in the UK, and helped revitalize their career in the band's home country of Canada, where their fame had diminished since the days of their debut album Gordon. In addition, follow-up singles "It's All Been Done", "Alcohol" and "Call and Answer" were each successful to some degree.

Stunt is the first studio album to feature keyboardist/guitarist Kevin Hearn, who originally joined the band for the Born on a Pirate Ship tour in 1995. Shortly after the release of the album, Hearn was diagnosed with leukemia. He spent the Stunt tour receiving chemotherapy and was replaced by Chris Brown and Greg Kurstin in the interim.

== Special edition and reissues ==
There was also a special edition of the album which contained the standard 13 tracks plus a second disc including two versions of "Brian Wilson" (the album version and the "2000" version), and live versions of "The Old Apartment", "Jane", "When I Fall", "If I Had $1000000" and "Straw Hat and Old Dirty Hank".

The album was released on vinyl June 2, 2015.

In 2018, Rhino Records announced a 20th Anniversary Edition to be released digitally on July 6, 2018, as well as physical copies on September 28, 2018. However, the date was pushed back to October 19, 2018. The physical forms come in a vinyl and a CD/DVD set. The DVD is the documentary for Barenaked In America, which was never previously released in North America. The album also contains the bonus tracks "She's On Time" and "Long Way Back Home". The CD version also adds "Get In Line", which appeared on the soundtrack to King of the Hill.

== Track listing ==
All tracks are written by Steven Page and Ed Robertson, except where noted.

No.	Title	Writer(s)	Lead vocals	Length
1.	"One Week"	Robertson	Page; Robertson	2:49
2.	"It's All Been Done"	Page	Page	3:26
3.	"Light Up My Room"		Robertson	3:36
4.	"I'll Be That Girl"	Page; Stephen Duffy	Page	3:34
5.	"Leave"		Robertson	3:24
6.	"Alcohol"	Page; Duffy	Page	3:43
7.	"Call and Answer"	Page; Duffy	Page	5:49
8.	"In the Car"	Page	Page	3:53
9.	"Never Is Enough"		Robertson	3:23
10.	"Who Needs Sleep?"		Robertson	3:44
11.	"Told You So"		Robertson	4:21
12.	"Some Fantastic"		Page; Robertson	4:16
13.	"When You Dream"		Page	5:19
Total length:				51:17

Limited edition bonus tracks
No.	Title	Lead vocals	Length
14.	"She's On Time"	Page	3:22
15.	"Long Way Back Home"	Robertson	4:39
Total length:			59:18

20th Anniversary edition bonus track
No.	Title	Length
16.	"Get In Line (King of the Hill soundtrack)"	3:40
Total length:		1:02:58

== Personnel ==
Adapted from the Stunt booklet.

Barenaked Ladies

- Jim Creeggan – electric bass (2, 6, 11), violin (5), electric double bass (1, 13), cello (7, 11), background vocals (2, 5, 6, 8–13), double bass (3–5, 7–10, 12), arco bass (11), handclaps (8), acoustic double bass (13)
- Kevin Hearn – organ (8), synthesizer (6, 7, 11), banjo (4), piano (6, 7, 12), accordion (4), electric guitar (1, 5, 8, 11), keyboards (1–5, 9, 12, 13), electric piano (3), background vocals (2–4, 8–10, 12), clavinet (10), melodica (8), sampling (13), wah wah guitar (5), handclaps (8)
- Steven Page – acoustic guitar (2–4, 13), electric guitar (2, 6, 10), background vocals (1, 3, 5, 7, 9–11), flute (10), piano (11), vocals (1), lead vocals (2, 4, 6–8, 13), phat drumz guy (9), co-lead vocals (12), handclaps (8)
- Ed Robertson – acoustic guitar (all but 4), electric guitar (all but 13), percussion (12), background vocals (1, 2, 4, 6, 8, 13), vocals (1), lead vocals (3, 5, 9–11), co-lead vocals (12), dans la maison (1), invisible rap (6), "Employee of the Month-July 1985" (9), handclaps (8)
- Tyler Stewart – drums (1–11), percussion (2, 5–7, 10, 12, 13), bongos (6, 8), background vocals (2, 9, 10), dans la maison (1), snare drums (12), handclaps (8)

Additional personnel

- Colin Alexander – scratching (9)
- Pierre "French Pete" Tremblay – background vocals (10)
- Natasha Hébert – Parlez Français (2)
- Sue Drew – Expert Violin Tuning (5)
- "Party" recorded live at Jimmy C's birthday (6)
- "Hala Hala Hala" sampled by Don Garbutt (10)

Production

- Producers – Barenaked Ladies, David Leonard, Susan Rogers
- Engineers – David Leonard, Susan Rogers
- Assistant engineers – Charlie Brocco, Femio Hernández, Boo Macleod, Kevin Szymanski
- Mixing – David Leonard, Tom Lord-Alge
- Mastering – Stephen Marcussen
- Design – John Rummen
- Photography – Jay Blakesberg
- Artwork – John Rummen

== Charts ==
=== Weekly charts ===
Chart (1998–99)	Peak position
Australian Albums (ARIA)	42
Canada Top Albums/CDs (RPM)	6
New Zealand Albums (RMNZ)	20
UK Albums (Official Charts)	20
US Billboard 200	3

=== Year-end charts ===
Chart (1998)	Position
Canada Top Albums/CDs (RPM)	56
US Billboard 200	33
Chart (1999)	Position
US Billboard 200	51

== Certifications ==
Region	Certification	Certified units/sales
Canada (Music Canada)	4× Platinum	400,000^{^}
United Kingdom (BPI)	Gold	100,000^{^}
United States (RIAA)	4× Platinum	4,000,000^{^}
^{^} Shipments figures based on certification alone.
