= Baby Blues (comic strip) =

American comic strip

- The MacPherson family (from left to right; Wanda, Wren, Zoe, Hammie and Darryl)
- Author(s): Jerry Scott, Rick Kirkman
- Current status/schedule: Running
- Launch date: January 7, 1990; 36 years ago
- Syndicate(s): Creators Syndicate (1990–1995); King Features Syndicate (1995–2022); Andrews McMeel Syndication (2022-present)
- Publisher: Andrews McMeel Publishing
- Genre: Humor

Baby Blues is an American comic strip created and produced by Rick Kirkman and Jerry Scott since January 7, 1990. Distributed by King Features Syndicate from 1995 until January 2022, and distributed by Andrews McMeel Syndication as of January 2022, the strip focuses on the MacPherson family and specifically on the raising of the three MacPherson children.

When the strip debuted, the MacPherson family consisted of Darryl and Wanda and newborn Zoe. The first strip took place in the hospital room shortly after Zoe was born. Later, two more children—Hammie, the middle child and the only son, and Wren, the youngest child—were added to the family. Both Kirkman and Scott have drawn from their own parenting experiences as a source for the strip's content.

On March 19, 2026, it was announced that new installments of the comic strip will end in 2027, though Baby Blues will still run in repeats. The final six months of new daily strips will alternate weekly with repeats, with new daily strips ending in September 2026. New Sunday strips will alternate with repeats, with new ones ending in March 2027.

== Characters and story ==
The strip features three families. The MacPhersons are the main focus. Butch and Bunny together with Yolanda and Mike make occasional appearances.

=== Main family (MacPhersons) ===
- Darryl MacPherson: The father. Age: 36. His job title is Senior Western Regional Assistant Director of Limited Budgetary Integration and Planning. The company manufactures and sells windshield wipers. Noticeable with his large nose. He is sometimes unaware of his wife's exhausted state. In various strips, Zoe, Wren and Hammie wait to meet him right when he gets home from work. In some strips, he appears to dislike a kids' show called "The Whistling Monkey Cowboy Band". One example is while Wren is obsessed with the merchandise, Wanda jokingly states that Bill Murray and Robin Williams have recently finished working on a "Whistling Monkey Cowboy Band" film whereupon Darryl retreats to the roof. He also tends to swear when accidentally injuring himself or frustrated which Wren repeats in some strips. He also tends to make mistakes, such as in Wren's ultrasound, he mistakes her for a boy. He has red hair, and is an only child.
- Wanda MacPherson (nee Wizowski): The mother. Age: 36. Though she originally had a job as a public relations executive, she chose to become a stay-at-home mother after Zoe was born. However, she becomes frustrated and jealous of the women she regards as better mothers. She is afraid of snakes. She is sometimes upset with her children but still loves them. She often springs into action without thinking twice, such as when she saw a woman hit her child in the middle of the grocery store and promptly intervened whereupon she got into a major scuffle with the woman in question. She later wondered if she did the right thing or not.
- Zoe MacPherson: The oldest sibling (name pronounced /ˈzoʊi/ ZOH-ee) (first appearance January 7, 1990; her birth starts the strip), age: 10. She tends to fuss the most over what Wanda does. She blames things on Hammie, even when she was the one who actually did something wrong. She is a major tattletale, to the point of getting withdrawal over not being able to tattle. Originally, her middle name was Jennifer, but a strip dated April 9, 2007, identified her middle name as Madison. Zoe excels in academics, and is harshly critical of Hammie for his scholastic limitations. Zoe is relatively normal in her interests: she is shown playing with toys, watching children's shows, and playing with other children. She, Hammie, and Wren apparently do not have any cousins: their only aunt is single and has no kids. At one point early on, Zoe was a fan of Barbie, though her ideas about Barbie vary between wanting to become a real life Barbie when she grows up (with Barbie related items) or basically using her to beat up her other toys while pretending that Barbie is some sort of monstrous freak (because of Wanda having referring to Barbie as a "freak of nature"). Zoe has a teddy bear named Christina Candle Flower Sparkle Jelly Bean Kissy Mooch. Zoe and Hammie attend the same school, Prickly Pear Elementary School.
- Hamish MacPherson: The middle sibling, called Hammie (first appearance: April 29, 1995), age: 7. He has great fondness and uninhibited enthusiasm for trucks, and can tell their model by sight, as proven in several strips. He has freckles and his hair is black like his mom's. He is the only MacPherson child who isn't a redhead. He did not have freckles until the June 14, 2006, strip. His first words were "buh-dozer" and "bazooka," much to Wanda's dismay. He often likes to tell Wanda or sometimes Darryl when Zoe teases or bullies him, but generally he gets mad less often than Zoe. He also likes annoying Zoe, e.g. by taunting her with snakes or other unpleasant vermin, and especially seeing her get into trouble, without having done anything himself. He was named after his great-great-grandfather, who was called "Ham". His teddy bear is called Twuck. Hammie attends Prickly Pear Elementary School.
- Wren MacPherson: The youngest sibling (first appearance: October 26, 2002), age: 2. She does not seem to be as much of a nuisance as her older siblings. Wren is a very curious baby. She often is shown climbing on top of things or grabbing at things. She said her first words (First "ma", then "da" and eventually "no") on Monday, May 19, 2008. Wanda explained that she thought of her name when a bird collided with a window during breakfast time in the hospital. As of Monday, February 16, 2009, Wren is officially able to stand. She has also learned the words "up", "down", and "%*@#! cramp" (from her father). She has shown an annoyance several times to her parents by holding her legs completely stiff so they couldn't change her diaper. More recently, she had her first birthday. On September 27, 2014, she has grown a full head of hair instead of a hair tuft. Her eyes are less wide than the other MacPhersons. She has a teddy bear named Mr. Woogles.

=== Additional characters ===
- Butch and Bunny: Bunny and her seeming perfection in terms of appearance and lifestyle is the target of any possible jealousy from Wanda. Nearly all main adult characters dislike Bunny and have frequently tricked her in some way or another. Bunny seems to be oblivious to how she irritates Wanda, or anyone else around her. She is similarly oblivious to the needs of others and thereby often comes off as self-centered and tactless. Bunny has a husband, Butch. Together, they have three sons: Bogart (the oldest), and identical twins Wendell John and Wendell Jon. The latter two were born August 10, 2002. In one strip, Zoe has said that when Bunny is not looking, she shuffles the twins, which proves that even Bunny cannot tell the difference between the two. Bunny once commented that she would buy identical twin goldfish for Wendell John and Wendell Jon when they get older. After a long absence from the strip, Bunny returned where it was revealed that she and Butch had a divorce and now has full custody of Bogart and the Wendells.
- Yolanda and Mike: An African-American couple. Yolanda and her husband, Mike, are close friends to the MacPhersons. Together, they have two daughters: Keesha and Dziko (nickname "Dizzy"), the latter of whom was born November 11, 2002.
- Rhonda Wizowski: Wanda's younger twin sister. Enjoys the life of being a single woman, except when given a hard time about not "having children and settling down" by her mother. She usually shows up as the babysitter when Wanda and Darryl go out and leave their children behind. She is sometimes even tricked into babysitting for them. Recently, she is shown wanting to find a partner and start a family. In one series of strips she is shown to have an online relationship with a gentleman named Thom, who called her Linda (He said "I love you, Linda") and caused her to throw wine at her computer; she broke up with him.
- Hugh and Maggie Wizowski: Wanda's parents.
- "Mac" and Pauline MacPherson: Darryl's parents. Darryl gets his big nose from Mac.
- Keesha: Zoe's best friend and neighbor. She has medium brown skin and black hair in braids and is about the same age as Zoe.
- Dziko: Keesha's younger sister and Yolanda and Mike's youngest daughter who is a toddler like Wren. She doesn't appear as often as her parents and older sister. Her eyes are less wide and more circle shaped like Wren's.
- Trent: Best friend of Hammie since kindergarten. He and Hammie like to do all the weird things together (especially to annoy Zoe). Another character of the same name has appeared as a friend of Zoe on May 6, 1997.
- Bogart: The oldest son of Butch and Bunny. He is Zoe's age, which is now 9 years old and he has short black hair.
- Ashley: Ashley is one of Zoe's friends who has black hair. She has an unnamed pet gerbil and is an only child according to Zoe. In her first appearance (June 20, 2007), Ashley makes it clear that she is a snobby rich girl (i.e.; saying that the MacPhersons' house was small, asking Zoe if they picked the wall's colors for the house, thinking Wanda was the maid). In both the first and last comic strips of the story, Zoe admits her reason for inviting Ashley was so that Wanda and Darryl would appreciate how nice she is.
- Mr. Doyle: Zoe and Keesha's teacher.
- Dr. Joseph: Dr. Joseph is the MacPhersons' doctor, who has blonde hair and a big nose similar to Darryl's.
- Bethany is a friend of Zoe, who is never seen nor heard and is only mentioned by Zoe. She threw a boy-girl party and for some reason did not invite Zoe.
- Bryan Barge is a boy in Zoe's class who was first mentioned by Zoe on March 5, 2011, as the boy she likes, but doesn't know she exists. She is in bed due to this was part of a story where she is sick. He has never appeared in the comic and was only mentioned by several characters in the strip. He is one of the few characters besides the MacPhersons and Wizowskis that have a known last name.

=== Cameo appearances ===
- November 26, 2022: Sally Brown and Snoopy from Peanuts.

== Timeline ==
The children in Baby Blues have aged as the strip has progressed, although at a slower rate than real-time. Kirkman and Scott have stated that the strip's timeline is "about a 3 to 1 ratio." As of 2021, Zoe, Hammie and Wren are 9, 7, and 2 respectively.

== Where they live ==
Where in the United States the family lives tends to vary widely. Sometimes they are depicted as living in the snowy North. At other times they are living in the Southwest, with cacti visible in some frames.

== Books ==
=== Scrapbooks ===
The first three Scrapbooks in the list below were not labelled "scrapbook" and didn't get a number, but they can be assumed to be number 1, 2 and 3 in that series because in the time line they precede number 4 of the Scrapbooks, and all of these books follow the same concept, i.e. they are collections of Baby Blues strips from the newspapers. Starting with Scrapbook 30, the books come in a larger format and contain more strips. Scrapbooks are paperbacks.

Scrapbook No.	Title	Date	ISBN
1	Baby Blues: This is going to be tougher than we thought.	April 1991	978-0-8092-3996-2
2	She Started It!	September 1992	978-0-8092-3266-6
3	Guess Who Didn't Take a Nap?	March 1993	978-0-8362-1715-5
4	I Thought Labor Ended When the Baby Was Born	March 1994	978-0-8362-1744-5
5	We Are Experiencing Parental Difficulties… Please Stand By	March 1995	978-0-8362-1781-0
6	Night of the Living Dad	March 1996	978-0-8362-1310-2
7	I Saw Elvis in My Ultrasound	September 1996	978-0-8362-2130-5
8	One More and We're Outnumbered!	March 1997	978-0-8362-2692-8
9	Check, Please…	March 1998	978-0-8362-5423-5
10	Threats, Bribes & Videotape	August 1998	978-0-8362-6750-1
11	If I'm a Stay-at-Home Mom, Why Am I Always in the Car?	March 1999	978-0-8362-7845-3
12	Lift and Separate	March 2000	978-0-7407-0455-0
13	I Shouldn't Have to Scream More Than Once!	August 2000	978-0-7407-0557-1
14	Motherhood Is Not for Wimps	March 2001	978-0-7407-1393-4
15	Baby Blues: Unplugged	March 2002	978-0-7407-2323-0
16	Dad to the Bone	August 2002	978-0-7407-2670-5
17	Never a Dry Moment	March 2003	978-0-7407-3304-8
18	Two Plus One Is Enough	March 2004	978-0-7407-4140-1
19	Playdate: Category 5	September 2004	978-0-7407-4665-9
20	Our Server Is Down!	October 2005	978-0-7407-5445-6
21	Something Chocolate This Way Comes	April 2006	978-0-7407-5686-3
22	Briefcase Full of Baby Blues	April 2007	978-0-7407-6355-7
23	Night Shift	October 2007	978-0-7407-6842-2
24	My Space	March 2009	978-0-7407-8089-9
25	The Natural Disorder of Things	October 2009	978-0-7407-8540-5
26	Ambushed! In the Family Room	October 2010	978-0-7407-9740-8
27	Cut!	April 2011	978-1-4494-0182-5
28	Eat, Cry, Poop	November 2011	978-1-4494-1458-0
29	Scribbles at an Exhibition	May 2012	978-1-4494-0972-2
30	Bedlam	November 2013	978-1-4494-3724-4
31	Wetter, Louder, Stickier: A Baby Blues Collection	November 2014	978-1-4494-5825-6
32	No Yelling!	October 2015	978-1-4494-6303-8
33	Gross!	October 2016	978-1-4494-7781-3
34	Binge Parenting	September 2017	978-1-4494-8511-5
35	Adult Time	October 2018	978-1-4494-8512-2
36	Surviving the Great Indoors	October 2019	978-1-5248-5175-0
37	BB3X: The Third Decade	October 2020	978-1-5248-6072-1
38	Stink Eye	November 2021	978-1-5248-6902-1
39	Multitasking	December 2022	978-1-5248-7562-6
40	NOT GUILTY-ish	October 2023	978-1-5248-8094-1
41	Everything Everywhere...	October 2024	978-1-5248-8779-7
42	Road Trip	October 2025	978-1-5248-9041-4

=== Treasuries ===
Treasuries are collections / compilations from strips in the Scrapbooks. Almost all of the Treasuries are paperbacks, just one is a hardcover (marked as "HC" here below).

Title	Date	ISBN
The Super-Absorbent, Biodegradable, Family-Size Baby Blues	September 1997	978-0-8362-3657-6
Ten Years And Still in Diapers	August 1999	978-0-7407-0008-8
Butt-Naked Baby Blues	August 2001	978-0-7407-1852-6
Wall-to-Wall Baby Blues	August 2003	978-0-7407-3811-1
Driving Under the Influence of Children	May 2005	978-0-7407-5005-2
Framed!	September 2006	978-0-7407-6194-2
X-Treme Parenting	April 2008	978-0-7407-7097-5
BBXX: Baby Blues: The First Two Decades (HC)	October 2012	978-0-7407-9828-3

=== Other collections / compilations ===
These two books are not labelled "treasuries", but follow a similar concept, i.e. they also repeat strips from the Scrapbooks, but emphasize a specific topic (school; the relationship between Darryl and Wanda). They are paperbacks.

Title	Date	ISBN
The Day Phonics Kicked In: Baby Blues Goes Back to School	September 2008	978-0-7407-7738-7
We Were Here First	April 2010	978-0-7407-9111-6

=== Gift Books ===
These books are collections / compilations similar to the Treasuries, but the Gift Books are smaller in size and come as hardcovers.

Title	Date	ISBN
We Are Not Alone	May 1996	978-0-8362-1325-6
It's A Boy	February 2010	978-0-7407-9166-6
It's A Girl	February 2010	978-0-7407-9167-3

== Television adaptation ==
Baby Blues was adapted into an animated television series for The WB. The animated version's timeline was from when Darryl and Wanda first gave birth to Zoe. Mike O'Malley supplied the voice of Darryl while Julia Sweeney played Wanda.

The first eight episodes of Baby Blues originally aired on The WB from July 28 to August 24, 2000, before being canceled. The five remaining episodes from the first season eventually aired on Adult Swim in 2002. A second season, consisting of 13 episodes, was produced but never aired.

The television series differed from the comic strip by focusing on Darryl and Wanda's relationship with the Bittermans, a neighbor family with three children (Rodney, Megan, and Shelby); Kenny, Darryl's co-worker; and Bizzy, the babysitter for Zoe. Rick Kirkman and Jerry Scott had only minimal creative control over the television series.

The theme song was "It's All Been Done" by the Barenaked Ladies.

== Foreign versions ==
French version of Baby Blues from January 14, 2006

Baby Blues has been translated into, among others, French, German and Swedish. This strip appeared in Canadian French-language newspapers on January 14, 2006. (The original American version appeared on January 16, 2006. It can be viewed in the Baby Blues Archive by subscribers to the site.)
