= Rick Kirkman =

Cartoonist (b. 1953)

Rick Kirkman (born 1953) is a cartoonist and co-creator of the comic strip Baby Blues. He received the National Cartoonist Society Newspaper Comic Strip Award in 1995, and the Reuben Award in 2012 for his work on the strip. He also served as co-executive producer of The WB animated television series of Baby Blues.

Prior to the creation of Baby Blues, Rick Kirkman worked as a humorous illustrator and gag cartoonist. His gag cartoons appeared in magazines including Saturday Evening Post, Saturday Review and Good Housekeeping. He created humorous illustrations for advertising clients including America West Airlines, Bic Corporation, Campbells, Ramada Inn and Best Western; and accompanying articles in Parents Magazine, Money, Children's Television Workshop and Redbook.

He collaborated with longtime friend, Jerry Scott, to create the comic strip Baby Blues, which was launched in 1990 by Creators Syndicate.
