= Jerry Scott =

American cartoonist (born 1955)

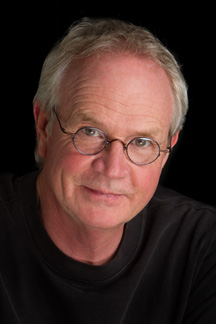
- Scott in 2014
- Born: May 2, 1955 (age 71); South Bend, Indiana, U.S.
- Occupation: Cartoonist
- Known for: Nancy, Baby Blues, Zits
- Spouse: Kim Scott
- Children: 2
- Relatives: JoAnn and Janet

Signature
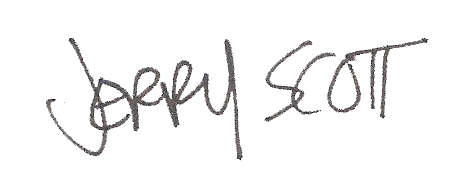

Jerry Scott (born May 2, 1955) is an American cartoonist and writer. He is known for co-creating the comic strips Baby Blues and Zits. He is one of only four cartoonists to have multiple strips appearing in over 1,000 newspapers worldwide.

== Career ==
Scott started cartooning professionally in the mid-1970s by submitting gag cartoons to magazines, and he sold one from his first batch to the Saturday Evening Post. In 1983, Scott was selected to succeed Mark Lasky (in the wake of Lasky's sudden death) on Ernie Bushmiller's Nancy. Scott modernized the strip to his own specifications, and eventually handed it over to Guy Gilchrist in the 1990s.

Scott became friends with Rick Kirkman and they created Baby Blues, a comic based on American family life with young children. Kirkman does the illustrations, while Scott does the writing. Baby Blues currently appears in over 1,200 newspapers in 28 countries and 13 languages. There are 43 Baby Blues collections in print.

Later, Scott and Jim Borgman collaborated to create Zits, which follows family life with a teenaged son. In Zits, Scott does the writing, while the drawings are done by Borgman. Zits currently appears in 1,700 newspapers in 45 countries and 18 languages. There are 37 Zits collections in print. Scott is one of four cartoonists in history to have two daily comic strips simultaneously syndicated in over 1,000 newspapers. As of 2020, Both Baby Blues and Zits are still in syndication.

On March 19, 2026, it was announced that both Baby Blues and Zits will end in the near future, with Baby Blues to end in March 2027.

Scott has received numerous awards, including The National Cartoonists Society's Silver Reuben Award for Best Comic Strip of the Year (1995, 1998 & 1999), The Adamson Statuette (Sweden), The Max & Moritz Prize (Germany) and the National Cartoonists Society's Reuben Award for Outstanding Cartoonist of the Year (2001).

== Personal life ==
Scott lives in San Luis Obispo, California with his wife and daughters. He is an oil painter and amateur guitarist.
