= It's All Been Done =

1998 single by Barenaked Ladies

Single by Barenaked Ladies

from the album Stunt
- Released: December 16, 1998
- Genre: Alternative rock
- Length: 3:26
- Label: Reprise
- Songwriter: Steven Page
- Producers: Barenaked Ladies; David Leonard; Susan Rogers

Barenaked Ladies singles chronology
"One Week" (1998)	"It's All Been Done" (1998)	"Call and Answer" (1999)

Music video
- "It's All Been Done" on YouTube

"It's All Been Done" is a song by Canadian alternative rock group Barenaked Ladies. It was released as the second single from their fourth studio album, Stunt (1998). The song was successful in Canada, peaking at No. 1 on the RPM 100 Hit Tracks chart and becoming the band's highest-charting song in their native country. The song was used as the theme song for the television series Baby Blues. The song is also notable for being one of the band's first to feature an electric guitar solo by Ed Robertson.

== Music video ==
The video was directed by Doug Aitken and was filmed in the former house of comedian Andrew Dice Clay. The concept of the video was that it was seen from the point of view of various household pets (a cat, a dog, a goldfish, and a bird). Robertson and Page were disappointed with the filming of the video while it was being shot, as they did not feel it was capturing the feeling of the concept. The video features a bald Kevin Hearn, as he was undergoing chemotherapy. He plays a Hohner Clavinet.

== Performances ==
The band performed the song on Saturday Night Live, Late Night with Conan O'Brien and The Tonight Show with Jay Leno. On The Tonight Show, actor David Duchovny, who had appeared as a guest earlier in the program, joined the band for the song in the musical segment, playing an egg shaker. The band had arranged it with the actor after an impromptu meeting a week earlier while shooting a television guest appearance at a studio lot.

== Track listings ==
Australian and Japanese CD single

1. "It's All Been Done" (album version) – 3:26
2. "One Week" (Pull's Break remix) – 3:21
3. "Brian Wilson" (live) – 4:40

UK CD single

1. "It's All Been Done" (album version) – 3:27
2. "Brian Wilson" (live from Rock Spectacle) – 4:46
3. "The Old Apartment" (live from Rock Spectacle) – 3:21

UK cassette single

1. "It's All Been Done" (album version) – 3:27
2. "Brian Wilson" (live from Rock Spectacle) – 4:46

== Personnel ==
- Steven Page – lead vocals, acoustic and electric guitars
- Ed Robertson – acoustic and electric guitars, backing vocals
- Jim Creeggan – electric bass, backing vocals
- Kevin Hearn – keyboards, backing vocals
- Tyler Stewart – drums, percussion, backing vocals
- Natasha Hébert – "Parlez Français"
- Tom Lord-Alge – mixing

== Charts ==
=== Weekly charts ===
Chart (1998–1999)	Peak position
Australia (ARIA)	57
Canada Top Singles (RPM)	1
Canada Adult Contemporary (RPM)	1
Europe (Eurochart Hot 100)	97
Germany (GfK)	77
Iceland (Íslenski Listinn Topp 40)	37
Scottish Singles Sales (Official Charts)	21
UK Singles (Official Charts)	28
US Billboard Hot 100	44
US Adult Alternative Airplay (Billboard)	6
US Adult Pop Airplay (Billboard)	9
US Alternative Airplay (Billboard)	15
US Pop Airplay (Billboard)	18

=== Year-end charts ===
Chart (1999)	Position
Canada Top Singles (RPM)	26
Canada Adult Contemporary (RPM)	28
US Adult Top 40 (Billboard)	35
US Mainstream Top 40 (Billboard)	78
US Modern Rock Tracks (Billboard)	72
US Triple-A (Billboard)	23

== Release history ==
Region	Date	Format(s)	Label(s)	Ref.
United States	October 19, 1998	Modern rock radio	Reprise	
Japan	December 16, 1998	CD	WEA Japan	
Australia	1999	CD	Reprise	
United Kingdom	May 3, 1999	CD; cassette	Reprise	
