= Susan Rogers =

American sound engineer and producer (born 1956)

- Born: August 3, 1956 (age 70); United States
- Occupations: Professor; sound engineer; record producer

Susan Rogers (born August 3, 1956) is an American professor, sound engineer, and record producer best known for being Prince's staff engineer during his commercial peak (1983–1987), including the albums Purple Rain, Around the World in a Day, Parade, Sign o' the Times, and The Black Album. During this time, Rogers laid the foundations for Prince's now-famous vault by beginning the process of collecting and cataloguing all his studio and live recordings. She has also worked as a sound engineer and record producer for other musical artists such as Barenaked Ladies (producing the 1998 album Stunt), David Byrne, Robben Ford, Jeff Black, Rusted Root, Tricky, Michael Penn, Toad the Wet Sprocket, and Tevin Campbell. Rogers is an associate professor in the Music Production and Engineering and Liberal Arts departments at Berklee College of Music.

== Life and career ==
Rogers was born on August 3, 1956, and grew up in Southern California. She developed an early interest in recorded music and, in the 1970s, moved to Hollywood. Her interest in working in a studio led her to work at the University of Sound Arts as a receptionist. After overhearing a conversation about maintenance technician training, she decided to start studying electronics, acoustics, and magnetism. This led her to apply for a job at Audio Industries in 1978, where she trained as an MCI console and tape-machine technician. She went on to become a maintenance tech for Rudy Records, Graham Nash and David Crosby’s studio, in 1981, where she got her first experience as an assistant engineer. Rogers moved to Minneapolis in 1983 to become Prince's technician. Her role quickly evolved into engineer despite only previously being an assistant engineer. As Prince's new recording studio Paisley Park opened its doors, Rogers left her job as his engineer and went on to have a 22-year career in the music industry.

In 2000, Rogers decided to leave the music business altogether and pursue a career in academia. She earned her doctorate in music cognition and psychoacoustics in 2010 from McGill University.

== Collaboration with Prince ==
Rogers was hired by Prince "sight unseen" after he sought an audio technician from Los Angeles. Her first official recording task with him was capturing the guitar solo for "Let's Go Crazy", the opening track of Purple Rain. This marked the beginning of a significant collaboration between Rogers and Prince.

A key aspect of Rogers' work was her role in creating and managing Prince's famed music collection, known as the Vault. This began as a practical solution to Prince's frequent requests for reference tapes. Realizing the importance of organizing these materials, Rogers collaborated with Prince's office staff to start a database of all the tapes, a task made challenging by the available technology in 1983. Her proactive approach led her to source recordings from various locations, including other studios, and she reached out to Warner Bros. to secure Prince's masters, a move that was not typical given the contractual norms of the industry. This effort notably saved these recordings from the 2008 Universal Studios fire that destroyed many other musical works.

Rogers' actions ensured that Prince's albums could be remastered and reissued posthumously. She has collaborated with the Prince Estate for the re-release of Sign o' the Times, which includes a deluxe edition with 63 previously unreleased tracks.

Beyond her technical expertise, Rogers shared insights into Prince's character, describing him as having extraordinary courage, work ethic, and artistic isolation. She emphasized his ability to focus on his work, avoid common pitfalls of the rock star lifestyle, and his leadership skills at a young age.

Rogers' book, This Is What It Sounds Like: What the Music You Love Says About You, co-written with Ogi Ogas, was published by W. W. Norton in 2022 ISBN 9780393541250.

== Awards ==
- Distinguished Faculty Award, Professional Writing and Music Technology Division at Berklee (2012)
- Recipient of a Grammy Foundation Research Grant
- Recipient of a Newbury Comics Faculty Fellowship
- Six-time Grammy nominee and three-time Juno nominee for recordings as an engineer/mixer/producer
