= Teena (comic strip) =

Comic strip about a teenage girl, created by Hilda Terry

Vintage powder compact by Hilda Terry

Teena is a comic strip about a teenage girl, created by Hilda Terry. It ran from July 1, 1944, to 1963, distributed by King Features Syndicate.

The strip evolved from Terry's earlier Sunday feature, It's a Girl's Life, a collection of gag cartoons which first appeared in newspapers on Sunday, December 14, 1941. The format displayed six panels about the reactions of teenage girls to World War II.

In Denmark, the strip was known as Tina.

== Significance ==
Comics historian Don Markstein noted:

They also could be marketed as a daily feature, but wartime paper shortages prevented that. The main characters were named Henny and Penny... In 1943, Harry Haenigsen launched his own girl-protagonist strip, titled Penny. In response, Terry dropped hers and started a more traditionally-formatted Sunday comic about a similar character with a different name. "Tina" was a good candidate for the new one's name, but the word "teenager" was just coming into vogue, so that was the spelling used. Teena started on July 1, 1944. Teena's much younger sister, Gwendolyn, was added to the cast later. Things went well for Terry and Teena for about 20 years, until a general decline in the newspaper business forced the cartoonist to find work elsewhere. She eventually wound up in the burgeoning field of computer animation, for which she won an award in 1979 from the National Cartoonists Society she'd been instrumental in opening up a generation earlier. As for Teena, sources differ as to the exact year of the comic's demise, ranging from 1963 to '66. There is little doubt, however, that Hilda Terry's comics creations are a part of comics history that hasn't been seen in years.

== Main characters ==
- Teena Merry - The main character, a red-haired teenage girl. In color strips, her hair is either orange, maize yellow, or in rare instances, blonde.
- Pipsie Squeakie - Teena's best friend, a teenage girl with dark hair. Her first name is sometimes spelled Pipsy.
- Gwendolyn - Introduced later in the strip. A precocious little girl who lives across the street from Teena, whom she had become friends with. Has a big teenage brother, who Teena was infatuated with.
- Mary Merry - Teena's mother.
- John Merry - Teena's father.

== See also ==
- Aggie Mack
- Carl Ed
- Etta Kett
- Freckles and His Friends
- Hal Rasmusson
- Harold Teen
- Marty Links
- Penny
- Zits
