= Harold Teen (disambiguation) =

Harold Teen was an American comic strip written and drawn by Carl Ed.

Harold Teen may also refer to:

- Harold Teen (1928 film), an American comedy film, based on the comic strip
- Harold Teen (1934 film), an American pre-Code comedy film, based on the comic strip
- Harold Teen (radio program), an old-time radio program, based on the comic strip
