= Etta Kett =

Comic strip by Paul Robinson

- Paul Robinson's Etta Kett (March 23, 1959)
- Author(s): Paul Robinson
- Current status/schedule: Concluded daily & Sunday strip
- Launch date: December 7, 1925
- End date: November 24, 1974
- Syndicate(s): Putnam Syndicate (1925–1927); Central Press Association (1927–1937); King Features Syndicate (1937–1974)
- Publisher(s): Standard Comics
- Genre(s): teen romance

Etta Kett is a long-running American comic strip created by Paul Robinson, which ran from December 7, 1925 to November 9, 1974. Starting as an etiquette feature, it evolved into the story of a middle class, suburban teenager, and her friends and family.

== Publication history ==
The original distribution in December 1925 was with the Putnam Syndicate, moving over to the Central Press Association in 1927, which was purchased in 1930 by King Features Syndicate.

The strip had several toppers during its run: Etta Kett Play Fashions, How to Draw Cartoons and Lovebyrds.

The strip came to an end two months after Robinson died on September 21, 1974. The last daily appeared November 23, 1974, with the final Sunday strip published one day later.

== Characters and story ==
Launched as a single panel during December 1925, it originally offered tips to teenagers on manners, etiquette and the social graces. Robinson, however, saw a narrative potential that went beyond the initial format, devising a strip of wholesome humor that maintained a readership over five decades. Drawing with a polished, clean-line style, he jettisoned the teen-tips to expand his teenage characters into a daily strip and Sunday page about energetic Etta Kett and her middle-class family and friends in a suburban setting.

Etta Kett came along six years after Carl Ed's Harold Teen and displayed certain parallels, notably activities set inside the Sugar Shack soda shop rather than the Sugar Bowl soda shop of Harold Teen. As Peter Kylling observed, Robinson also borrowed from his earlier strip, The Love-Byrds:

The series premiered in the early 1920s. Stopped in 1925. Apparently just another series about a married couple living in the suburbs, but there are differences taking the time and age in consideration: Howard Byrd helps with the daily chores, and Peggy Byrd works in an office along with Howard. Furthermore, Howard likes his parents-in-law(!) and he joins the army only to be kicked out because of poor eyesight. The father character in Robinson's next comic book series, Etta Kett, is clearly modelled after Howard, and the series as a whole may be seen as a continuation of The Love-Byrds, except that the Ketts have a daughter who is in focus. She, on the other hand, bears resemblance to Peggy Byrd!

The brunette Etta and her boyfriend Wingey Wallace experienced an endless round of activities and events, such as soda fountain sessions at the Sugar Shack (where Wingey worked), rooting for the home team at the football field, arranging dates, pulling pranks and heading off for the rodeo. Comics historian Andy Madura commented, "Beginning in late 1925, Etta Kett was another of the flapper strips stemming from the 1920s. Like those that survived the era, Etta Kett had to metamorphosize away from the frivolous flapper mentality to attract Great Depression and beyond readers. For Etta Kett this was largely accomplished by putting Etta into a more college-like setting and making her the proper opposite to her somewhat wolfish boyfriends."

During the 1930s fad for comic strip paper novelties, Robinson added play money and paper dolls to his full-size Etta Kett pages. Peter Kylling noted how the strip kept up with current fads and trends:

The overall plot shows the typical high school girl Etta Kett, her family, and her many teenage friends living a fairly normal suburban town life. Robinson was very particular about his panels so that both the characters' problems, their wardrobes, taste in music and so on artually corresponded with real life at the given times.

== Critical reaction ==
In Toonopedia, comics historian Don Markstein described the art style and the essence of the strip:

Despite the dropping of the original didactic mission, Etta never went beyond the bounds of old-fashioned propriety, even as the rest of the world became more permissive. Comics historian Stephen Becker called her and her friends "blandly good-looking young people" who "cavort in total innocence". Robinson used a sparse, fluid style, which was popular during the 1920s in all areas of American commercial art. Tho times changed, the look of Etta Kett didn't. It retained its clean, bold, uncluttered appearance for almost half a century.

Paul Robinson's Etta Kett (July 3, 1948)

== Comic books ==
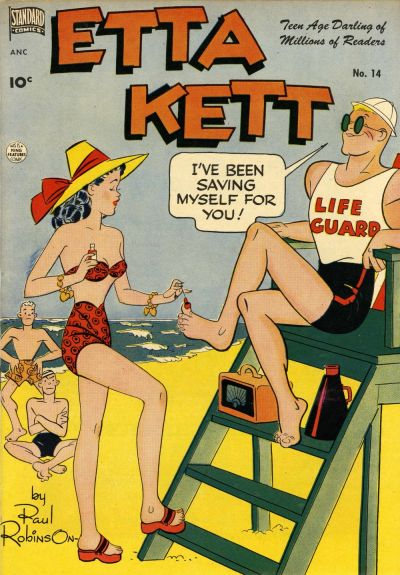
Paul Robinson's Etta Kett (1948)

Four issues of an Etta Kett comic book (numbered 11 through 14) were published by Standard Comics in 1948, all displaying the cover blurbs: "This Is a King Features Comic" and "Teen Age Darling of Millions of Readers".

A coloring book, Color the Comics with Etta Kett and Her Friends from the Famous Comic Strip, was published by Saalfield in 1960.

== In popular culture ==
In 1957, Harvey Kurtzman lampooned the strip in his satirical Trump magazine.

== See also ==
- Aggie Mack
- Carl Ed
- Freckles and His Friends
- Harold Teen
- Marty Links
- Penny
- Teena
- Zits
