= Too Many Girls =

Too Many Girls may refer to:

- Too Many Girls (musical), a 1939 Broadway musical comedy
- Too Many Girls (film), a 1940 film based on the musical
- "Too Many Girls", a 1966 episode of The Monkees
