= Walter T. Foster =

Walter Thomas Foster (1891–1981) was an American entrepreneur, artist, art instructor, writer, editor, and publisher. The Walter Foster Publishing Company's line of low-cost art manuals were widely distributed to art stores, often displayed in a metal rack specially made for Foster's oversized art books. Today, Walter Foster Publishing is part of the Quayside Publishing Group, which is owned by Quarto Publishing.

== Laguna Beach artists and books ==
While residing in Laguna Beach, California, Foster owned and operated an advertising agency, where he worked with many local artists and illustrators. Through his friends in the art community, he discovered many artists who wanted to teach art and write books. In response, Foster started a publishing company in his home, where he wrote, illustrated, printed, bound, packaged, shipped, and distributed the books himself. An artist in his own right, Foster created the company’s first title, How to Draw, which sold more than one million copies and is still in print today. Foster died in 1981 at the age of 90, at which time his family took over company operations.

One of Foster's most notable artists was Preston Blair, whose book, Animation, sold more than one million copies and is still in print today. Another noteworthy artist, Hal Rasmusson (Aggie Mack), wrote Modern Cartoon. Roger Armstrong (Ella Cinders, Napoleon and Uncle Elby) was the author of How to Draw Comic Strips (1990).

== Walter Foster Publishing ==
In 1988, a group of investors comprising Andrew McNally IV (former president of Rand McNally), Illinois businessman Rhett Butler, attorney Paul Hegness, and California businessman and former Price Waterhouse CPA Ross Sarracino purchased the Walter Foster Publishing Company. With Sarracino at the helm, the company began developing instructional drawing and painting books for children.

The popularity of these children’s books eventually led to licensing agreements with The Walt Disney Company, Nickelodeon, Hasbro, Marvel Entertainment, DC Comics, and Warner Bros. Walter Foster Publishing's Walt Disney books and activity kits have sold more than 4,500,000 copies since 1991.

In 1996, Quarto Publishing, under direction of CEO Laurence Orbach, acquired Walter Foster Publishing, leaving Sarracino at the helm as President and CEO. In addition to growing its publishing and custom packaging (creating books and kits for Baker & Taylor, Barnes & Noble, Chronicle Books, Disney Press, Michaels, Scholastic, TJ Maxx, and Target) business, Foster teamed with MEDL Mobile to create the Learn to Draw Digital Sketchbook app for the iPad. Since the app became available in December 2010, it has been downloaded over 200,000 times.
