= I Like to Recognize the Tune =

Song
- Published: 1939
- Songwriter(s): Lorenz Hart
- Composer(s): Richard Rodgers

"I Like to Recognize the Tune" is an American popular song written by composer Richard Rodgers and lyricist Lorenz Hart. The song was introduced by Eddie Bracken, Marcy Wescott, Mary Jane Walsh, Richard Kollmar and Hal Le Roy in the 1939 Broadway musical Too Many Girls.

== Background ==
The lyrics lament the distortions of melody inherent in Jazz and Swing, and popular interpretations of music in general: "I like to recognize the tune / I want to savvy what the band is playing / I keep saying, "Must you bury the tune?" In his autobiography, Musical Stages, Richard Rodgers described the motivations that inspired the song: "we voiced objection to the musical distortions, then so much a part of pop music because of the swing-band influence."

The 1940 film version of Too Many Girls, which starred RKO contract star Lucille Ball and the Broadway hit's cast member Desi Arnaz (who met and fell in love on the set, and married soon afterwards), did not feature the song. The song would appear in a later musical revue turned into a Lucille Ball film, Meet The People (MGM, 1944), and was sung by the film's supporting player, June Allyson, who met her own future husband in that film's co-star, Dick Powell.

== Recordings ==
"I Like to Recognize the Tune" has been recorded by many jazz and popular artists over the years, including Mel Tormé, George Shearing, Dinah Shore, Gene Krupa, Tal Farlow, Bobby Short, Carol Kidd, Stan Getz, and Johnny Desmond.
