= Ivy Scott =

Australian actress and opera singer

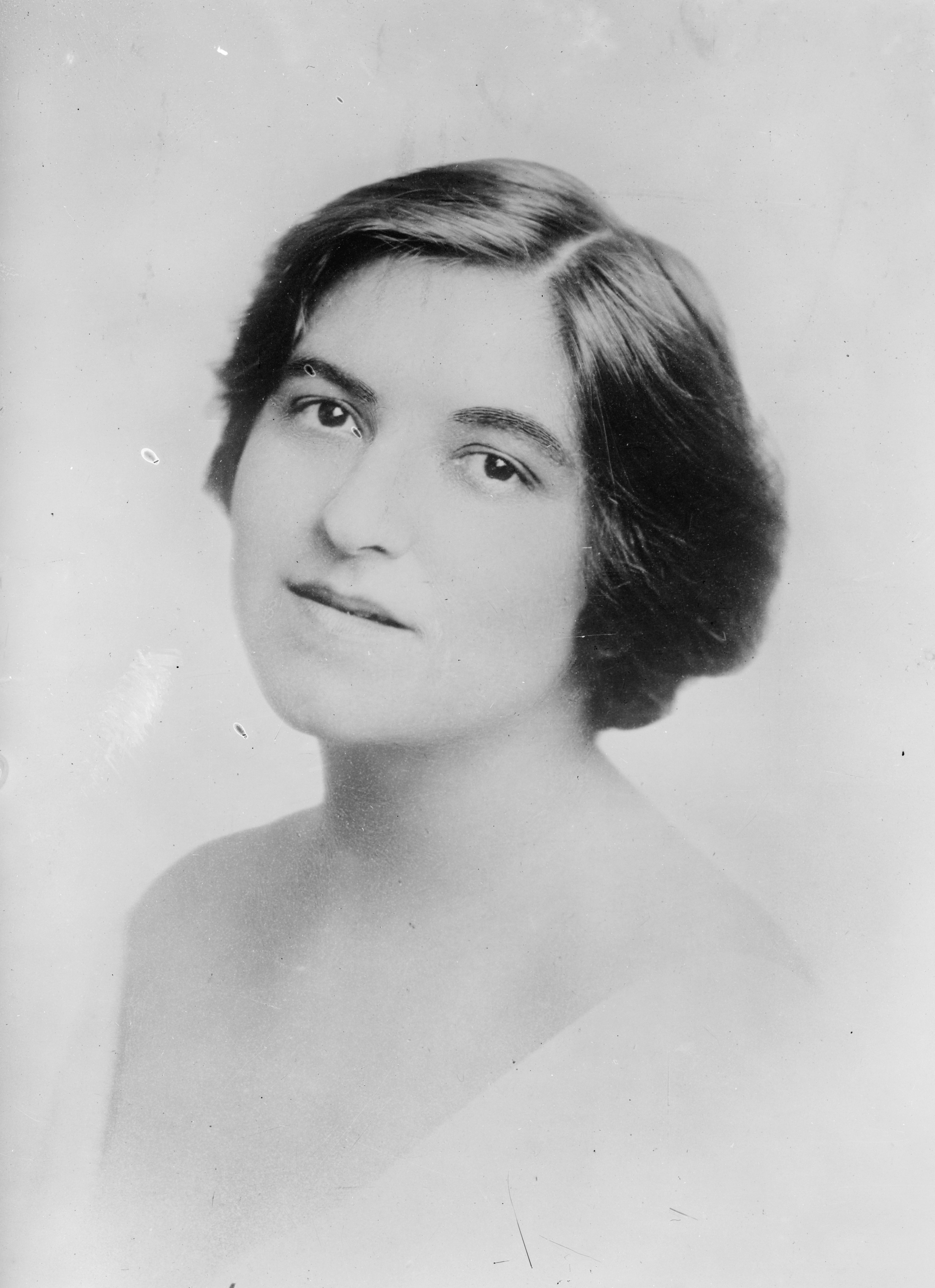
Ivy Scott

Ivy Scott (1886 – 3 February 1947) was an Australian stage actress and opera singer.

She was born at sea off the coast of Java, "her christening robe was the Union Jack" and the birth was registered on Thursday Island. Her Scottish parents were migrating to Australia and had wanted the baby born in North Queensland, where her father was hired to be the inspector of schools. Scott was raised in the Croydon, Queensland gold fields.

Scott made her theatrical debut in Hans, the Boatman before moving to the United States in 1910. She was hired by the National Broadcasting Company (NBC) in 1925 and for seven years had her own radio program. Scott sang on all of NBC's light opera and Gilbert and Sullivan shows. She was the original Mrs. Hudson in NBC's Sherlock Holmes series, the Madam Louise in The Goldbergs radio show and appeared on Broadway from 1932 to 1946. In 1942 she was living on Staten Island. She had a son, Harry E. Walker (1920–1998), who was a chemical engineer with the Shell Oil in Wood River, Illinois. She died in 1947.

== Performances ==
=== Theatre ===
- Music in the Air (1932)
- Revenge with Music (1934)
- Three Waltzes (1937)
- Too Many Girls (1939)
- Liberty Jones (1941)
- Sunny River (1941)
- Song of Norway (1944–1946)

=== Filmography ===
Year	Title	Role	Notes
1940	Too Many Girls	Mrs. Tewksbury	
1943	Higher and Higher	Mrs. Whiffin	(final film role)
