= Gedunk bar =

Term for the Canteen or snack bar of a U.S. military vessel

A Gedunk bar or geedunk bar (/ˈɡiːdʌŋk/ GHEE-dunk) is the canteen or snack bar of a large vessel of the United States Navy or the United States Coast Guard. The term in this sense was first recorded in Leatherneck Magazine in 1931. A service member who works in the geedunk is traditionally referred to only as that "geedunk guy" or "geedunk girl", or more informally as a "geedunkaroo". The term was popular during World War II.

== Overview ==
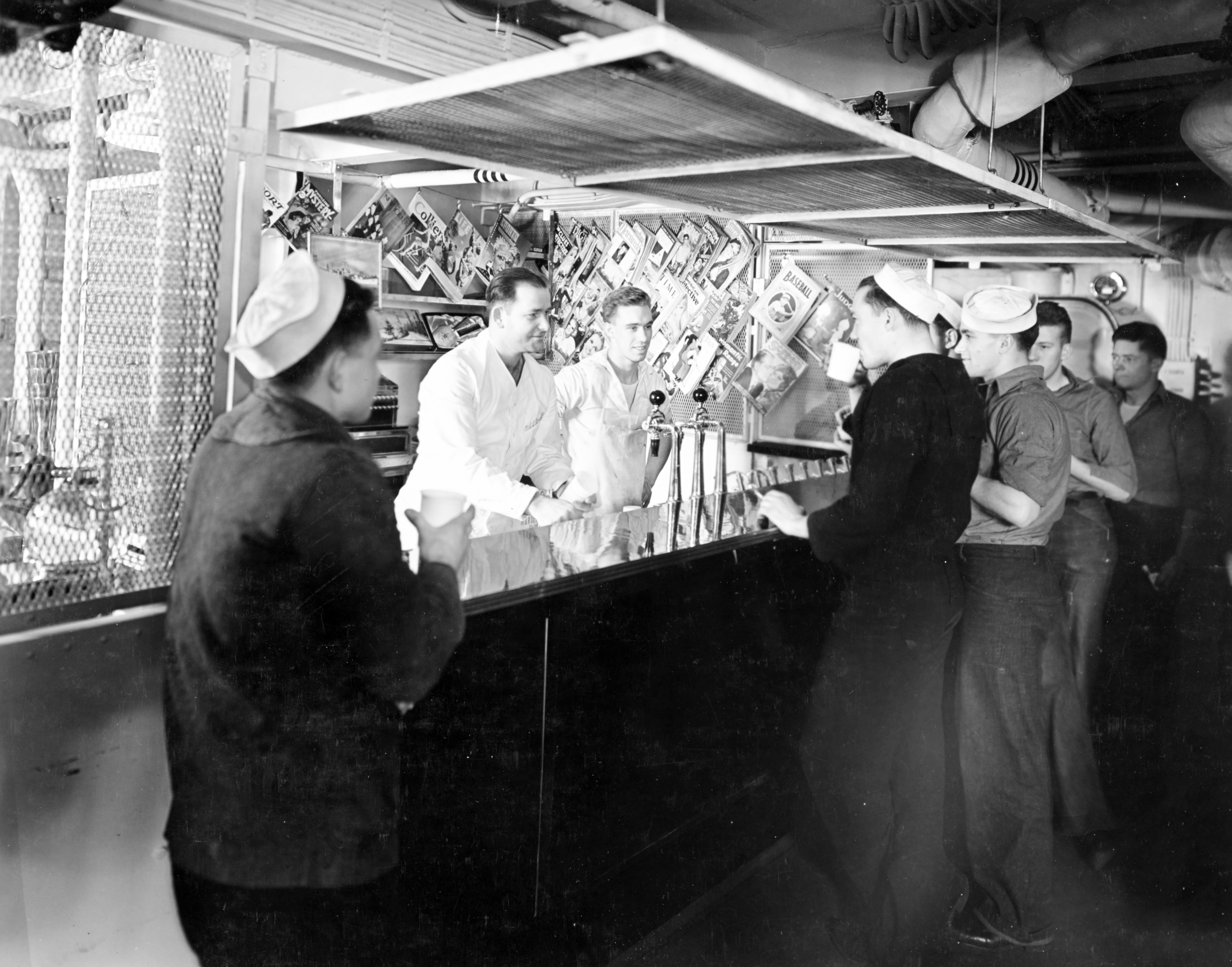
Gedunk bar aboard USS Brooklyn (CL-40), in 1938.

The origin of the word is uncertain. One theory suggests the name is derived from the "gee-dunk" sound that vending machines made when operated. Another theory is that the term is derived from the comic strip Harold Teen, in which Harold eats Gedunk sundaes, chocolate ice cream with ladyfingers "ge-dunked" into it, at the local soda shop. Navy ships would have soda shops rather than bars, as the Navy was bone-dry afloat since alcohol was banned by Secretary of the Navy Josephus Daniels in 1911. Yet another theory suggests that the word's origin is from a Chinese word meaning "place of idleness".

The gedunk bar was usually open for longer hours than the mess. Such bars were stocked with a wide variety of consumables such as snacks, soft drinks and fresh coffee. In the 21st century, sailors and Marines continue to call a place where snacks are for sale a "gedunk bar" or "gedunk machine" and refer to the snacks themselves as "gedunk".

In modern times, the gedunk is usually a spare room or space in a unit's location, where there are refrigerators and shelves to hold cold drinks and snacks. Some gedunks have coffee pots, hot soup, and occasionally barbecue. Items range in price from $.25 to a few dollars. Gedunks are stocked by purchasing bulk food items from grocery stores or warehouse stores such as Costco, not items taken from official supply chains. Profits from gedunk sales are minor, but usually go toward unit functions, such as the Marine Ball.

During the Vietnam War, all who served honorably in the U.S. armed forces were awarded the National Defense Service Medal. Because the medal was issued regardless of any length of service during the specified period (i.e., graduating from boot camp), it was called a "Gedunk medal".

== See also ==
- U.S. Navy slang
- List of established military terms
