= Aggie Mack =

American comic strip

- Author: Hal Rasmusson (1946–1962); Roy L. Fox (1962–1971)
- Current status/schedule: Concluded
- Launch date: September 2, 1946
- End date: January 9, 1972
- Alternate name: Aggie (1966–1972)
- Syndicate(s): Chicago Tribune Syndicate
- Publisher(s): Superior Comics; Dell Comics
- Genre: Humor

Aggie Mack was a newspaper comic strip about a teenage girl. Created by Hal Rasmusson, it was distributed by the Chicago Tribune Syndicate beginning on September 2, 1946, and concluding on January 9, 1972. It had a 26-year run, with a title change to Aggie during the final six years.

== Publication history ==
When Rasmusson was in ill health, the series was taken over by Roy L. Fox, starting with the strip dated January 8, 1962; Rasmusson died later that year. In 1966, the title was shortened to Aggie. The final episode of the strip was published on January 9, 1972. Beginning in 1947, the strip was very popular in France where it was published in the Fillette magazine. In 1960, Gérard Alexandre (who used the pseudonym AL.G.) created an all-French version of the strip and titled it Aggie.

== Characters and story ==
The central figure was a blonde named Aggie (a nickname based on her first name Agnes). Aggie was raised by her father's second wife, who favored her own daughter, Mona, a few years older than Aggie. Comics historian Don Markstein commented:

Dad was seldom seen, tho he did support the family from afar. Aggie's only friend at home was Whiskers, a stray dog she adopted early on—who, of course, was hated by the rest of the family. The rest of her social life was pretty ordinary—school activities, a succession of boyfriends, the usual array of pals and rivals… and her family situation never reached the point of out-and-out slavery to her step-mother and step-sister, tho her friends did sometimes remark on the unfairness of it all. Even at that, it gradually eased up as the series progressed. It never quite went away, but the Archie-like aspects dominated more as time went on.

== Reprints ==
Aggie was adapted to comic books by Superior Comics, which published eight issues between January 1948 and August 1949. In 1962, Dell Comics adapted Aggie into an issue of their Four Color Comics.

== See also ==
- Etta Kett
- Freckles and His Friends
- Harold Teen
- Kate Osann
- Marty Links
- Penny
- Teena
- Zits
