= Hilda Terry =

Cartoonist

- Hilda Terry in 1947.
- Born: Theresa Hilda Fellman; June 15, 1914 Newburyport, Massachusetts
- Died: October 13, 2006 (aged 92) New York City
- Area: Cartoonist
- Notable works: Teena
- Awards: National Cartoonists Society Animation Award, 1979; Friends of Lulu Women Cartoonists Hall of Fame, 2001

Theresa Hilda D’Alessio (June 25, 1914 – October 13, 2006), better known as Hilda Terry, was an American cartoonist who created the comic strip Teena. It ran in newspapers from 1944 to 1964. After marriage, she usually signed her name Theresa H. D’Alessio. In 1950, she became the first woman allowed to join the National Cartoonists Society.

== Biography ==
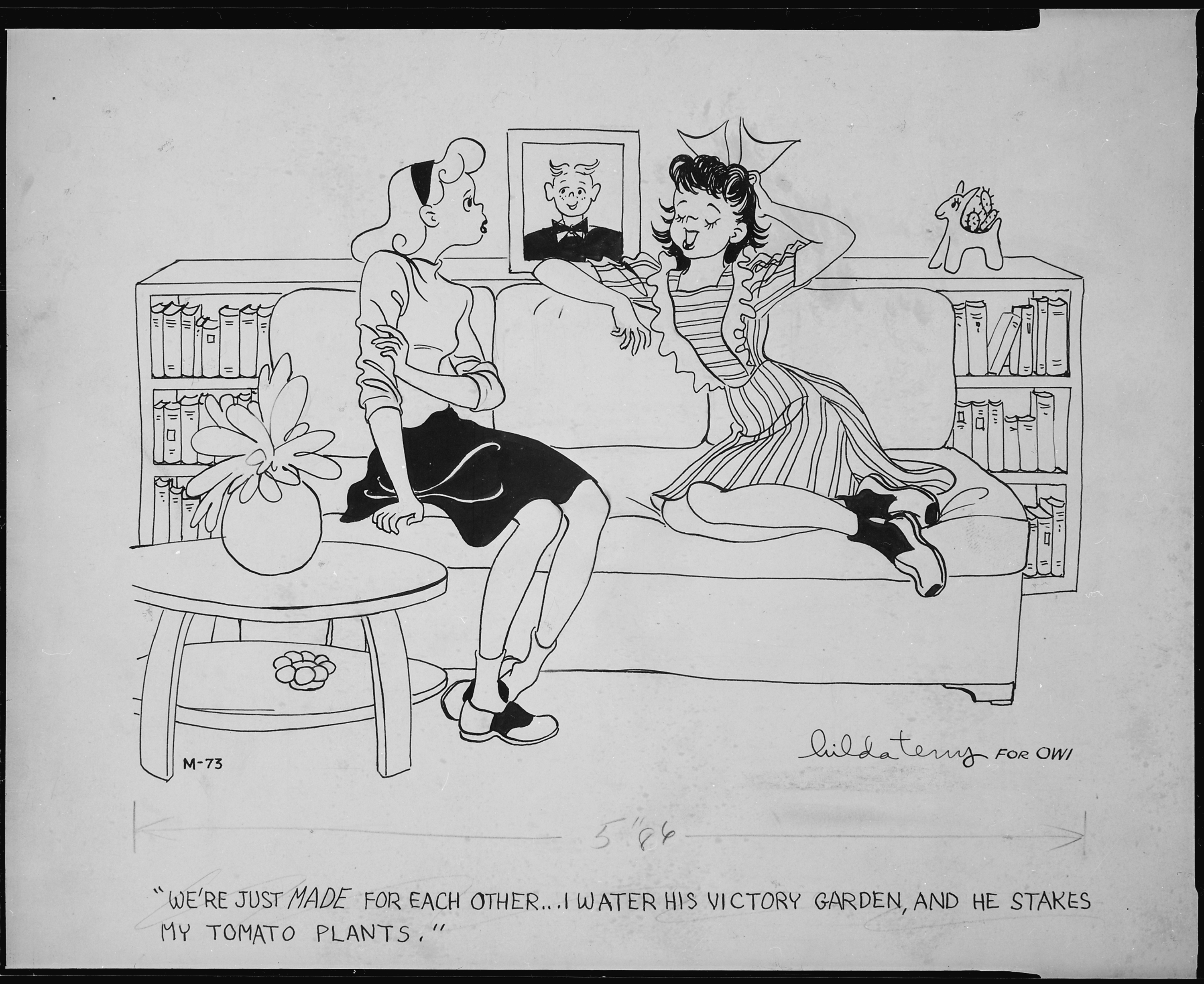
1943 cartoon for the Office of War Information

Born Theresa Hilda Fellman in Newburyport, Massachusetts, she was the daughter of a man who lettered roulette wheels. She admired the sports cartoons of Willard Mullin, wanted to become a sports cartoonist and spent time sketching at sports events. She arrived in New York when she was 17 and spent two years working as a waitress at Schrafft's. During the mid-1930s, she reconsidered her career plan after she entered both a sports cartoon and a funny cartoon in a newspaper contest, winning a prize with the funny cartoon.

While working as a waitress, she studied art at the Art Students League. One of her teachers there was Gregory d'Alessio, and they married in 1938. She was signed by King Features Syndicate to create a feature comic strip, It's A Girl's Life, which would soon become Teena, the strip for which she is most well-known. The strip premiered December 7, 1941, and ran until 1964. She also won a contest and a $100 war bond for the best "Waste-not" cartoon sponsored by the Office of War Information and the War Production Board in 1943.

She led an active life during the late 1940s, serving as a Camp Fire guardian, a Blue Bird leader, a Horizon Club advisor and an American Youth Hosteler, once leading a group of girls on a ten-day bicycle trip through New England.

Comics historian Tom Spurgeon detailed how she broke through barriers at the once all-male National Cartoonists Society in 1950:

Terry was early on a magazine cartoonist, and is said to have placed work in such high-profile outlets as The Saturday Evening Post and The New Yorker. Terry's work on Teena displays the clarity and precision of magazine-style cartooning, which must have helped it stand out, particularly in its initial years when a more decorative style was still on display in several features. Teena was a King Features strip, and was licensed briefly to comic books (at Standard) as well. Terry was a member of the Art Students League of New York, where she met her future husband Gregory d'Alessio, who preceded Terry in death. In 1949, d'Alessio submitted his wife's name for membership in the then all-male National Cartoonists Society, putting her on the ballot with magazine cartoonist Barbara Shermund. She was admitted a year later after much debate, and immediately set about bringing more female cartoonists into the fold. She later became an award-winning animator and pioneering contributor to sports-stadium animations, and pursued a variety of personal interests until her death.

Once she was a member of the NCS, she proposed Gladys Parker and other women cartoonists for memberships.

== Animation ==
She drew portraits of ballplayers for baseball stadium scoreboards in the early 1970s and subsequently became a pioneer in early computer animation. She traveled from city to city to create her giant animated portraits of major league players and team mascots. She was the animation artist for the Kansas City Royals Baseball Club.

== Books ==
Sketches of Hilda Terry by her husband, Gregory d'Alessio

In the 1970s, Terry collaborated with the controversial ex-Communist artist, actor and producer Harvey Matusow on Matusow's self-published book, The Babysitter's Magic Mouse Storybook. "Some people wanted to revive the Magic Mouse stories", Terry said, "and he wanted me to illustrate them with my teenagers, from when young girls were more innocent. Teena started as a babysitter during World War II."

D'Alessio, who was men's president of the Art Students League, died in 1994. Even into her eighties and nineties, Terry continued her teaching at the Art Students League.

Fascinated with the Salem witch trials (and despite the fact that she was Jewish), Terry expressed her belief that she was the reincarnation of Dorcas Good, a four-year-old child who was imprisoned with her accused mother, Sarah Good, who was later executed. Terry wrote about this double life and her approach to art in her self-published autobiography, Strange Bod Fellows (1992). Terry also held strong pro-Israel beliefs.

== Awards ==
Terry received the Animation Award from the National Cartoonists Society in 1979. She was elected to the Friends of Lulu Women Cartoonists Hall of Fame in 2001.

== 8 Henderson Place Foundation ==
Terry and d'Alessio's home in New York was designated as a non-profit foundation. Terry saw it as an archival repository, as well as a place to showcase her husband's paintings. It is a New York City landmark that sits at the entrance to Carl Schurz Park and Gracie Mansion.

== See also ==
- Edwina Dumm
- Marty Links
- Dale Messick
- Rina Piccolo
- Hal Rasmusson
