= Too Many Girls (film) =

1940 film by George Abbott

- theatrical release poster
- Directed by: George Abbott
- Screenplay by: John Twist
- Based on: Too Many Girls; 1939 musical by George Marion Jr., Richard Rodgers, and Lorenz Hart
- Produced by: George Abbott
- Starring: Lucille Ball; Richard Carlson; Ann Miller; Eddie Bracken; Frances Langford; Desi Arnaz; Hal Le Roy
- Cinematography: Frank Redman
- Edited by: William Hamilton
- Music by: George Bassman; Songs: Richard Rodgers (music); Lorenz Hart (lyrics)
- Production company: RKO Radio Pictures
- Distributed by: RKO Radio Pictures
- Release date: October 8, 1940
- Running time: 85 minutes
- Country: United States
- Language: English

Too Many Girls is a 1940 American musical comedy film directed by George Abbott, who had also directed the hit Broadway musical on which it was based, which ran for 249 performances. The film's screenplay is by John Twist, and it stars Lucille Ball, Richard Carlson, Ann Miller, Eddie Bracken, Frances Langford, Desi Arnaz and Hal Le Roy.

Too Many Girls was released by RKO Pictures on October 8, 1940, to mixed critical reception. In the decades since its release, it has become well-known primarily because Ball and Arnaz portrayed characters that have nothing to do with each other in the screenplay and dance numbers, but they met and became friendly for the first time during filming. They eloped and married approximately six months after filming wrapped. Their wedding took place shortly after the film's release.

== Plot ==
Tycoon Harvey Casey is frustrated by his daughter Connie's frequent efforts to escape her hired bodyguards. She arrives back in the United States from finishing school in Italy, intent on going to Harvey's alma mater Pottawatomie College in Stop Gap, New Mexico. He is suspicious of her intentions, and even more concerned about her safety. After meeting Princeton football star Clint Kelly, Casey wants to hire him and his fellow players – Jojo Jordan, Manuelito Lynch, and Al Terwilliger – to discreetly serve as Connie's bodyguards at Pottawatomie. The boys all sign contracts (which include an "anti-romance" clause) to conceal their positions from Connie.

Since Harvey's undergrad days, however, the college has fallen into financial straits. Student leaders Eileen and Pepe try to raise $300 to fend off debt collectors. When the three boys arrive, they donate money from their salaries. Meanwhile, Clint rides the bus with Connie, and sees her deliver a letter to an Indian man – the letter is addressed to Beverly Waverly. Connie befriends Eileen and Pepe, but suspects someone is following her.

The boys become popular at Pottawatomie, even more so as they turn the school's terrible football team into one of the country's best. Clint discovers Connie only came to Pottawatomie to chase her latest beau, British playwright Beverly Waverly. As the other three boys find themselves pursued by female students, Clint withdraws socially to focus on his studies and job. Harvey uses his connections to further the team's reach.

Connie eventually begins pursuing Clint, who has fallen for Connie and finds it increasingly difficult to honor the "anti-romance" clause. The boys are concerned about the effect their relationship will have on them, Clint, and the football team. After Connie tells him who she really is, Clint divulges his and the boys' position and the "anti-romance" clause.

A devastated Connie drops out of Pottawatomie, and forces the boys to come back East with her. The student body attempts to hold their football stars hostage. They capture Manuelito, but the other three escape. Beverly convinces Connie to allow the boys to come back and play. Clint initially refuses, but Connie arrives to convince him and confesses her love. After winning the big game, Clint and Connie dance as the college celebrates.

== Cast ==
- Lucille Ball as Consuelo "Connie" Casey
- Richard Carlson as Clint Kelly
- Ann Miller as Pepe
- Eddie Bracken as Jojo Jordan
- Frances Langford as Eileen Eilers
- Desi Arnaz as Manuelito Lynch
- Hal Le Roy as Al Terwilliger
- Libby Bennett as Tallulah Lou
- Harry Shannon as Harvey Casey
- Douglas Walton as Beverly Waverly
- Chester Clute as Harold Lister
- Tiny Person as Midge Martin
- Ivy Scott as Mrs. Tewksbury
- Byron Shores as Sheriff Andaluz

Uncredited

- Chief John Big Tree as Chief
- Pamela Blake as student
- Iron Eyes Cody as Indian
- Peggy Drake as student
- Harry James as orchestra leader
- Van Johnson as chorus boy
- Jay Silverheels as Indian
- Grady Sutton as football coach
- Dorothy Vernon as faculty
- Dan White as faculty

Cast notes:

- Desi Arnaz, Eddie Bracken, Hal LeRoy, Libby Bennett, Ivy Scott, Byron Shores and Van Johnson all also appeared in the Broadway musical on which the film is based, playing the same characters. It was the Broadway debut for all of them except LeRoy.
- During the course of filming, Lucille Ball and Desi Arnaz fell in love. They eloped on November 30, 1940.

== Production ==
Too Many Girls originated as a Broadway musical that debuted in October 1939. In February 1940, RKO paid $100,000 for the rights to the musical to create a film adaptation. Filming on Too Many Girls began on June 22.

== Songs ==
The songs in Too Many Girls were all written by Richard Rodgers, who composed the music, and Lorenz Hart, who wrote the lyrics. The songs are:

- "You're Nearer"
- "Pottawatomie"
- "I Didn't Know What Time It Was"
- "Spic and Spanish"
- "Love Never Went to College"
- "'Cause We All Got Cake"
- "Heroes in the Fall"

All the songs also appeared in the Broadway musical, except for "You're Nearer". Songs that were used in the stage musical and not used in the film were "Tempt Me Not", "My Prince", "I Like to Recognize the Tune", "The Sweethearts of the Team", "She Could Shake the Maracas", "Too Many Girls", and "Give it Back to the Indians".

== Critical response ==
Bosley Crowther of The New York Times wrote that Too Many Girls was a "pleasant, light-hearted and wholly ingenuous campus film" but that director George Abbott "permitted it to sag in the middle, at which point the thin spots baldly show." Crowther complained some of the dance numbers looked dark and gloomy. "If the intention was to be impressive, it has failed. For 'Too Many Girls' is a simple, conventional rah-rah picture, without any place for pretense. And there is not enough to it, on the whole, for Mr. Abbott to squander dancers recklessly."
