= Ups and Downs (1937 film) =

- Directed by: Roy Mack
- Written by: Jack Henley; Cyrus Wood
- Produced by: Vitaphone Corporation
- Starring: Hal Le Roy; June Allyson
- Cinematography: Ray Foster
- Edited by: Bert Frank
- Music by: Sammy Cahn; Saul Chaplin; Cliff Hess
- Distributed by: Warner Bros.
- Release date: 1937
- Running time: 21 minutes
- Country: United States
- Language: English

Ups and Downs (1937) is a short film directed by Roy Mack and starring Broadway dancer Hal Le Roy. It was released by Warner Bros. as part of its Broadway Brevities series of two-reel musical shorts, released in 1937 and 1938.

The film was made in New York City, and was Bronx native June Allyson's first film for a major studio.

== Synopsis ==
An elevator operator Harry Smith (Hal Le Roy), who works in a luxury hotel, courts the hotel president's daughter June Dailey (June Allyson). She is engaged to another, but when her fiancé leaves on a business trip, Harry asks her to join him for dinner.

During dinner, Harry is introduced to her father, who misinterprets Harry's remarks about elevators as being a tip to invest in the Upsadaisy Elevator Company. June's fiancé returns and breaks off the engagement, thinking that his prospective father-in-law has lost everything on a worthless stock. However, the investment turns out to be wildly profitable, Harry and June are engaged, and the film ends with them tap-dancing away in a production number dominated by a giant stock ticker machine.

== Cast ==
- Hal Le Roy as Harry Smith
- June Allyson as June Daily
- Phil Silvers as Charlie
- Fred Hillebrand
- Alexander Campbell
- Reed Brown Jr.
- Toni Lane as herself (singer)
- The Deauville Boys as themselves (singers)

== Home media ==
Ups and Downs appears as a special feature on the 2005 DVD of the film Stage Door.
