= Paul Robinson (cartoonist) =

American cartoonist (1898–1974)

- Born: Paul Dowling Robinson; June 19, 1898 Kenton, Ohio, U.S.
- Died: September 21, 1974 (aged 76) Glen Ridge, New Jersey, U.S.
- Area: Cartoonist
- Notable works: Etta Kett

Paul Dowling Robinson (June 19, 1898 – September 21, 1974) was a comic strip artist best known for his long-run Etta Kett comic strip.

== Biography ==
=== Early life and education ===
Born in Kenton, Ohio, Robinson was the son of an iron moulder, and the Robinson family were farmers in Buck, Ohio, by 1910. When Paul Robinson signed his draft card on September 12, 1918, he was living at 1219 West Jefferson in Sandusky, Ohio, and working as a demurrage railway clerk in the local Big Four freight offices.

=== From clerk to cartoons ===
Peggy Byrd from Paul Robinson's comic strip The Love-Byrds

On June 21, 1919, the Sandusky Register reported that Robinson had left Sandusky two months earlier to begin his new career as an artist at the Bray Productions animation studios in New York. He began doing panels and strips for the Central Press Association, continuing with King Features Syndicate after Central Press was purchased by King Features in 1930.

=== Early strips ===
In the mid-1920s, Robinson took over the Samson and Delia strip from Tim Early and the screenwriter and short story author H. C. Witwer. Another Robinson feature of the 1920s was his single-panel series Just Among Us Girls.

=== Etta Kett ===
In 1932, Robinson found success with Etta Kett. The strip about teenager Etta Kett began as a way to teach etiquette to teens, hence its name. Robinson also drew The Love-Byrds, about the cheerful couple Peggy and Howard Byrd, as a topper strip above Etta Kett. Etta Kett's poses, facial features and hair style are all similar to Peggy Byrd.

Etta Kett ran in more than 50 American newspapers for almost 50 years, starting December 1925 and continuing until November 24, 1974. In 1957, Harvey Kurtzman lampooned the strip in his satirical Trump magazine.

=== Personal life and death ===
Robinson lived at 14 Hillbury New Road in Essex Fells, New Jersey. He was 76 years old when he died Saturday, September 21, 1974, at Mountainside Hospital in Glen Ridge, New Jersey.
