= Central Press Association =

American newspaper syndication company

- Industry: Print syndication
- Founded: 1910; 116 years ago
- Founder: Virgil Venice McNitt
- Defunct: 1971; 55 years ago
- Fate: absorbed into King Features Syndicate
- Headquarters: Cleveland, Ohio, U.S.
- Key people: Leslie Eichel; Frank McLearn; Murray Rosenblatt
- Products: features, columns, comic strips, photographs
- Owners: Virgil Venice McNitt (1910–1930); King Features Syndicate (1930–1971)
- Subsidiaries: North American Press Syndicate; Editors Feature Service

The Central Press Association was American newspaper syndication company based in Cleveland, Ohio. It was in business from 1910 to 1971. Originally independent, it was a subsidiary of King Features Syndicate from 1930 onwards. At its peak, the Central Press supplied features, columns, comic strips, and photographs to more than 400 newspapers and 12 million daily readers. Notable comic strips that originated with Central Press include Brick Bradford, Etta Kett, and Muggs McGinnis (later titled Muggs and Skeeter).

== History ==
Virgil Venice McNitt (1881–1964), the managing editor of the Cleveland Press, founded the Central Press Association in Cleveland in 1910. In 1912, McNitt acquired the Chicago-based North American Press Syndicate and merged it into the Central Press. That same year, McNitt entered into arrangements to publish works authored by William Jennings Bryan and Jane Addams. Other early features were Bob Satterfield's cartoons, Edna K. Wooley's column, and a sports column by Ed Bang.

He hired Bryan to cover the 1912 Republican and Democratic National Conventions for the Central Press. He also made a deal with Addams to circulate her Progressive Party Platforms to newspaper across the country.

In 1920, McNitt founded a separate, New York City-based Central Press Association, which was soon absorbed by his new McNaught Syndicate (founded in 1922).

By 1925, the original Central Press's features had 12 million daily readers and was the largest newspaper picture service in the United States. In 1927, the Central Press also took over the Editors Feature Service and in August 1929 it acquired control of Johnson Features.

Also in 1929, the company constructed a mechanical production plant in New York, again forming a Central Press Association of New York, Inc. to operate the new plant.

Virgil McNitt remained the president and general manager of the Central Press from its founding in 1910 until 1930, when he sold the service to King Features Syndicate, part of the Hearst newspaper syndicate, which retained the Central Press as a separate division. Frank McLearn was managing editor of the Central Press at the time of the sale, eventually becoming president and general manager of King Features Syndicate.

William H. Ritt wrote sports features and comic strips for the Central Press Association, including the strips Brick Bradford and Chip Collins Adventures, and possibly ghosting for Gilbert Patten on Frank Merriwell's Schooldays.

Central Press didn't introduce any new comic strips after circa 1934; King Features took over syndication of all Central Press's strips circa 1937.

Murray Rosenblatt was the managing editor of the Central Press from 1946 to 1961.

The Central Press Association continued to operate as a separate division specializing in producing material for small-town newspapers until ceasing operations in 1971.

== Syndicated properties ==
=== Features ===
- Beauty by Madame Rubinstein
- Jess Cargill editorial cartoons
- Diet and Health, by Lulu Hunt Peters
- Hocus Pocus, by Wil Davey
- Dr. Gary C. Myers' psychology series
- News Notes From Movieland (syndicated Sunday column), by Daisy Dean (pseudonym); ran from January 1916 to about March 1936 (with Dean as editor), and to about June 27, 1936 (with no editor listed)

=== Comics ===
Strips and panels that originated with the Central Press Association, the North American Press Syndicate, or Editors' Feature Services:

- Big Sister, by Les Forgrave and later Bob Naylor (1928–1972)
- Brick Bradford by William Ritt and Clarence Gray (1933–1987)
- Chip Collins Adventures by William Ritt & Jack Wilhelm (July 17, 1934–July 27, 1935) — succeeds Frank Merriwell's Schooldays
- Etta Kett, by Paul Robinson (1927–Nov. 23, 1974) — taken over from Putnam Syndicate, where it originated Dec. 1925; accompanied by topper strip The Lovebyrds
- The Figgers Family by Victor E. Pazmiño (Jan. 3, 1927 – June 2, 1928)
- Frank Merriwell's Schooldays by Gilbert Patten & Jack Wilhelm (July 20, 1931–July 14, 1934) — succeeded by Chip Collins Adventures
- Goofey Movies, by Fred Neher (1920s) — animal strip
- High Pressure Pete, by George Swanson (1927-1937)
- Humorous Slants on Humanity, by Clifford McBride (c. 1920s–c. 1930s)
- Jimmy Jams by Victor E. Pazmiño (late 1920s) — daily panel
- Just Among Us Girls, originally written by Kathryn Kenney and then by Betty Blakeslee, with illustrations by R. J. Scott, "Maier," Paul Robinson, Ruth Carroll, and Walter Van Arsdal (1926–December 14 1935) — created for Editors' Feature Service
- Muggs McGinnis, (later named Muggs and Skeeter) by Wally Bishop (1927–Feb. 1974)
- The Old Home Town, by Lee W. Stanley and Harriet Stanley (January 3, 1923–1966)
- Sport Side-Lights, by Jack Sords (c. 1920–c. 1930s)
- That's Not the Half of It by Elmer Messner (Feb. 1926–July 1927) — created for Editors Feature Service

=== Sports writers ===
- Norman E. Brown
- William H. Ritt
- Jack Sords
- Al Winfield

=== Opinion ===
- The Way of the World by Grove Patterson (editor of the Toledo Blade)
- Who's Who
- Timely Views
- The Grab Bag

== See also ==
- McNaught Syndicate
