= Harold Teen =

American comic strip

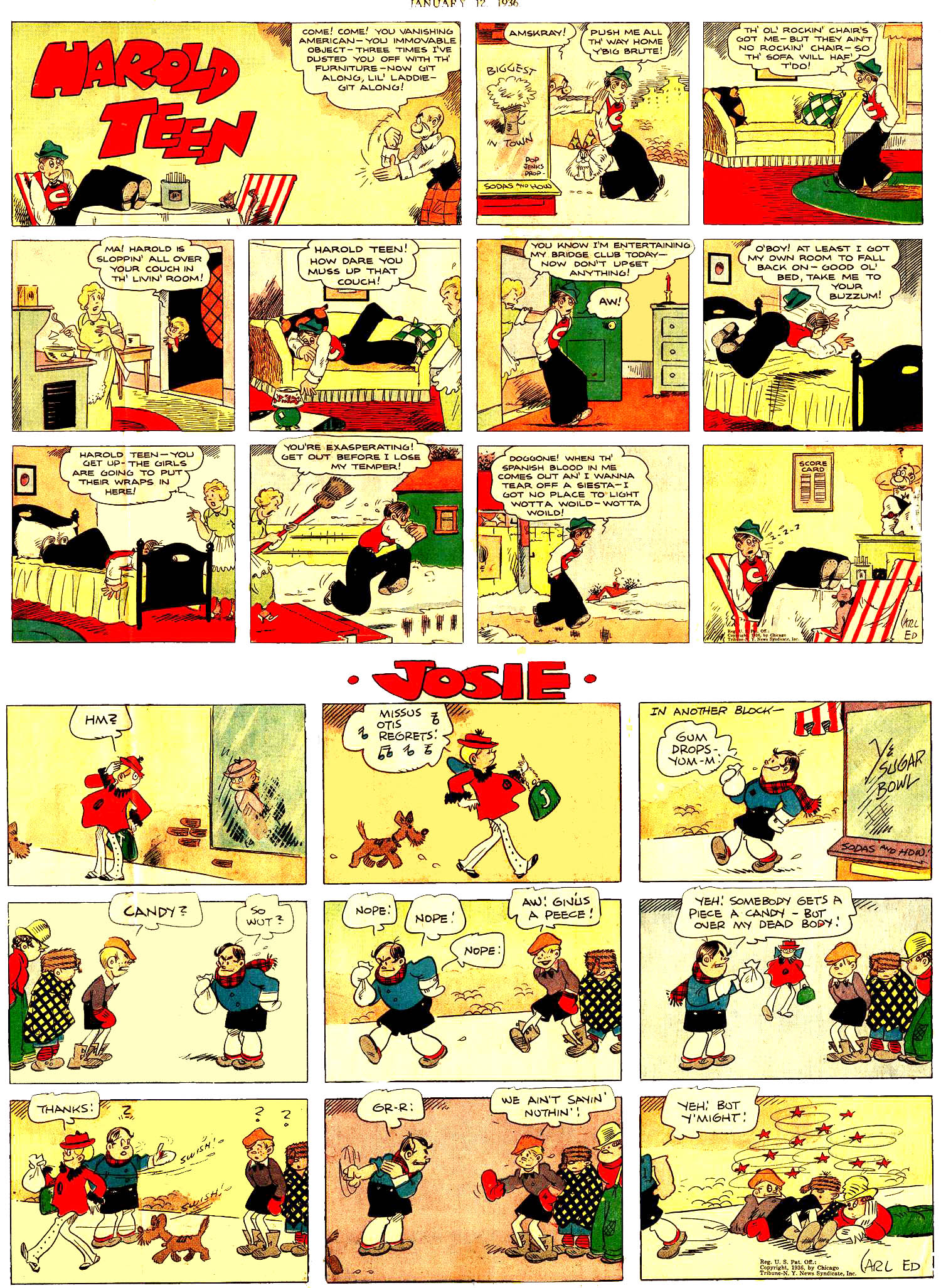
- Cartoonists often had to fill an entire page. Here is Carl Ed's page as it looked in the 1930s with Harold Teen at top and his Josie at bottom (January 12, 1936).
- Author(s): Carl Ed
- Current status/schedule: Concluded daily & Sunday strip
- Launch date: May 4, 1919
- End date: November 18, 1959
- Syndicate(s): Chicago Tribune Syndicate
- Publisher(s): Dell Comics; Whitman Publishing
- Genre(s): Humor, Adolescence

Harold Teen was an American comic strip written and drawn by Carl Ed (pronounced "eed"). Publisher Joseph Medill Patterson may have suggested and certainly approved the strip's concept, loosely based on Booth Tarkington's successful novel Seventeen. The strip ran from 1919 to 1959. Asked in the late 1930s why he had started the strip, Ed answered, "Twenty years ago, there was no comic strip on adolescence. I thought every well-balanced comic sheet should have one."

== Sundaes on Sunday ==
Under the title The Love Life of Harold Teen, it debuted as a Sunday strip in the Chicago Tribune on May 4, 1919, and a few months later it was nationally syndicated by the Chicago Tribune New York News Syndicate. A daily strip was added later that year. The strip was so successful in depicting the Jazz Age that it became a minor cultural icon of its time. The principal characters were Covina High School student Harold Teen, his girlfriend Lillums Lovewell, his diminutive sidekick Alec "Shadow" Smart and Pop Jenks, proprietor of the Sugar Bowl soda shop where Harold consumed Gedunk sundaes. The Sugar Bowl (aka Ye Sugar Bowl) also sold "Sodas and how" and advertised "the biggest soda in town."

Pop Jenks was inspired by the real-life Pop Walters, who ran a soda fountain and stationery shop across from the high school Ed attended in Moline, Illinois. The Gedunk sundaes reached such popularity that Ed had to answer requests for a recipe. In the 1928 Harold Teen film, the sundae is a soupy concoction of ice cream and hot chocolate which is eaten by "gedunking" a large ladyfinger cookie in it. As noted in Random House’s Historical Dictionary of American Slang, the word "gedunk" soon entered military slang to refer to snack shops and ice cream beginning with a 1931 usage in Leatherneck Magazine.

1939 Better Little Book

The success of the strip led to toys, figurines, pins and other products. Reprints appeared in Dell's Popular Comics, and Whitman published a Better Little Book, Harold Teen in Swinging at the Sugar Bowl (1939). During World War II, Harold joined the Navy. In the post-war period, the strip failed to retain its relevance. When Ed, who lived at 711 Michigan Avenue in Evanston, Illinois, died in 1959, his once-popular comic strip died with him.

Three different topper strips by Carl Ed ran on his page, positioned beneath Harold Teen: The Absent Minded Professor (January 4, 1931 to November 9, 1933), Josie (1935 to early 1940s) and Myrtle (1943 to 1951).

== Films ==
Carl Ed received writing credit for both film adaptations of Harold Teen. In the 1928 silent version, Harold was portrayed by Arthur Lake, best known for his many performances as Dagwood Bumstead. The Educational Screen commented: "The lovelorn hero of the comic strips is delightfully done by Arthur Lake who is the real Spirit of Seventeen. Everybody and everything you've laughed over in the papers is there, including Lillums, Horace, Beezie, the Gedunk sundae and the autographed Ford and slicker." Tap dancer Hal Le Roy had the title role in the 1934 Harold Teen musical.

== Radio ==
Willard P. Farnum (1906–1994) and Charles Flynn portrayed Harold Teen in the 1941–1942 radio series which aired on Tuesday evenings at 7:30 p.m. Willard Waterman was also in the cast.

There was also a Harold Teen radio show mid-day on Saturdays on the Tribune radio station WGN in Chicago. It was mostly a DJ show with Harold and his buddy Shad spinning the latest hits. This was during the 1950s.

Kansas City jazz band pianist Joe Sanders wrote a song about the "Don Juan of comic strip fame", describing him as a "human love machine" and as "romance personified". A performance by the Coon-Sanders Original Nighthawk Orchestra can be heard in the March 1, 1929, episode of the Maytag Frolics radio program.

== Cultural references ==
- In the musical Company, with book by George Furth and music and lyrics by Stephen Sondheim, the character Joanne propositions the character Robert, and as he attempts to decline her offer she interrupts him saying, "Don't talk. Don’t do your folksy Harold Teen with me."
- In April, 2017, Harold Teen and his friends made a guest appearance in the Dick Tracy comic strip.
- In Edward Eager's Magic by the Lake, Mark criticizes two older teenage boys as "Dudes! Cake-eaters! Harold Teens!"

== See also ==
- Aggie Mack
- Etta Kett
- Freckles and His Friends
- Kate Osann
- Marty Links
- Penny
- Teena
- Zits
