= Harold Teen (1928 film) =

1928 film

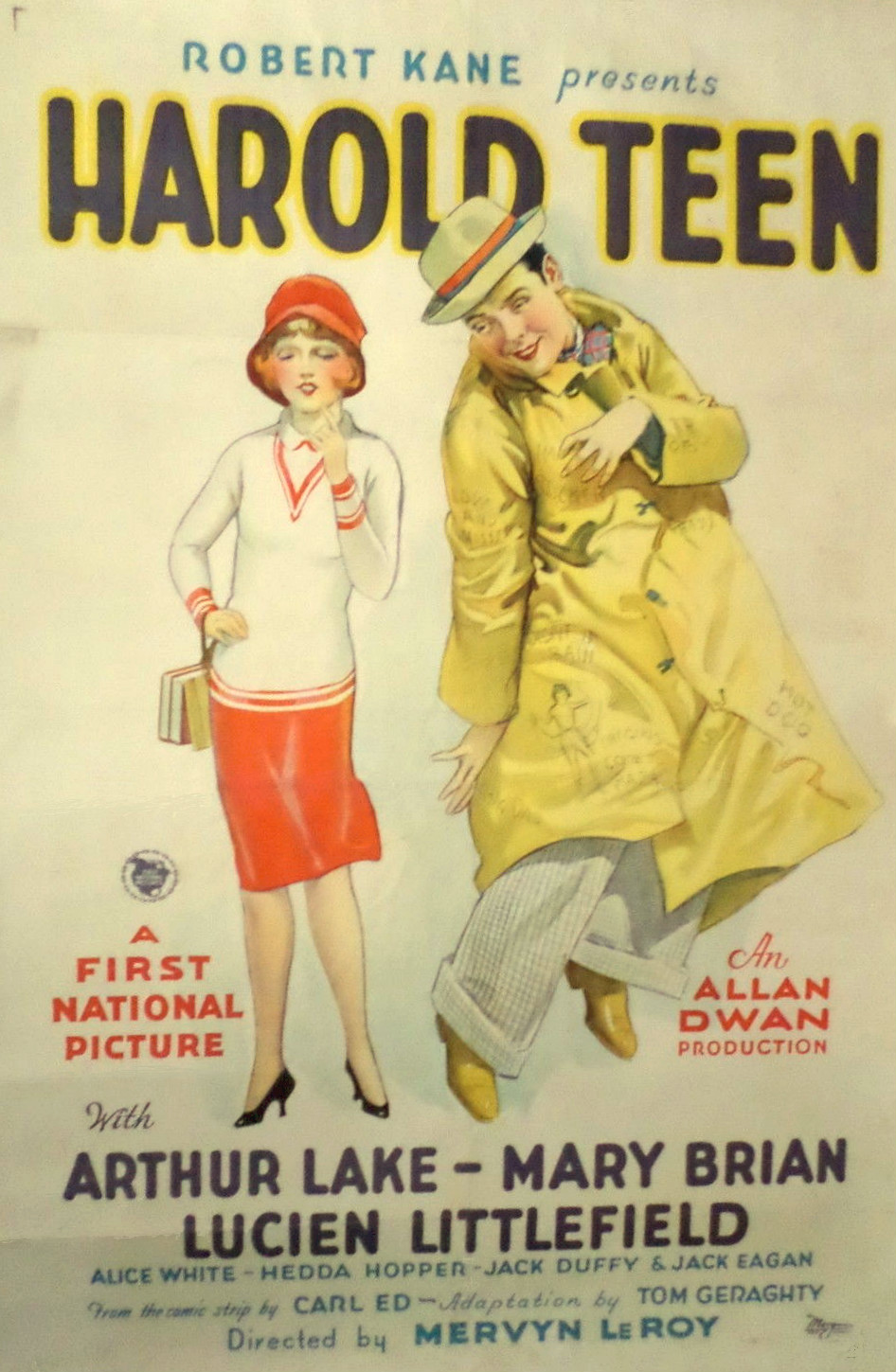
- Film poster
- Directed by: Mervyn LeRoy
- Screenplay by: Thomas J. Geraghty
- Based on: Harold Teen by Carl Ed
- Produced by: Robert Kane
- Starring: Arthur Lake; Mary Brian; Lucien Littlefield; Jack Duffy; Alice White; Jack Egan
- Cinematography: Ernest Haller
- Edited by: LeRoy Stone
- Production company: First National Pictures
- Distributed by: First National Pictures
- Release date: April 29, 1928
- Running time: 80 minutes
- Country: United States
- Language: Silent (English intertitles)

Harold Teen is a 1928 American silent comedy film directed by Mervyn LeRoy and written by Thomas J. Geraghty. It is based on the comic strip Harold Teen by Carl Ed. The film stars Arthur Lake, Mary Brian, Lucien Littlefield, Jack Duffy, Alice White, and Jack Egan. The film was released on April 29, 1928, by First National Pictures.

== Cast ==
- Arthur Lake as Harold Teen
- Mary Brian as Lillums Lovewell
- Lucien Littlefield as Dad Jenks
- Jack Duffy as Grandpop Teen
- Alice White as Giggles Dewberry
- Jack Egan as Horace Teen
- Hedda Hopper as Mrs. Hazzit
- Ben Hall as Goofy
- William Bakewell as Percival
- Lincoln Stedman as Beezie
- Fred Kelsey as Mr. Lovewell
- Jane Keckley as Mrs. Teen
- Ed Brady as Officer Axel Dewberry
- Virginia Sale as Mrs. Schmittenberger
- Inez Marion
- Harold Lockwood

== Preservation ==
Prints of Harold Teen are in the collections of the Library of Congress and UCLA Film & Television Archive.
