= Harold Teen (1934 film) =

- Theatrical release poster
- Directed by: Murray Roth
- Screenplay by: Paul Gerard Smith; Alfred A. Cohn
- Based on: Harold Teen by Carl Ed
- Starring: Hal Le Roy; Rochelle Hudson; Patricia Ellis; Guy Kibbee; Hugh Herbert; Hobart Cavanaugh
- Cinematography: Arthur L. Todd
- Edited by: Terry O. Morse
- Production company: Warner Bros. Pictures
- Distributed by: Warner Bros. Pictures
- Release date: April 7, 1934
- Running time: 67 minutes
- Country: United States
- Language: English

Harold Teen is a 1934 American pre-Code comedy film directed by Murray Roth and written by Paul Gerard Smith and Alfred A. Cohn. It is based on the comic strip Harold Teen by Carl Ed. The film stars Hal Le Roy, Rochelle Hudson, Patricia Ellis, Guy Kibbee, Hugh Herbert and Hobart Cavanaugh. The film was released by Warner Bros. Pictures on April 7, 1934.

== Cast ==
- Hal Le Roy as Harold Teen
- Rochelle Hudson as Lillums Lovewell
- Patricia Ellis as Mimi Snatcher
- Guy Kibbee as Pa Lovewell
- Hugh Herbert as Ed Rathburn
- Hobart Cavanaugh as Pop
- Chick Chandler as Lilacs
- Douglass Dumbrille as Snatcher
- Eddie Tamblyn as Shadow
- Clara Blandick as Ma Lovewell
- Mayo Methot as Sally LaSalle
- Richard Carle as Parmalee
- Charles C. Wilson as McKinse
