= Muggs and Skeeter =

American comic strip by Wally Bishop

- The first two panels of the October 6, 1936, Muggs and Skeeter, by Wally Bishop. Muggs is on the left, Skeeter is in the middle, and their dog Hoiman is on the right.
- Author: Wally Bishop
- Current status/schedule: Concluded daily strip
- Launch date: 1927
- End date: February 1974
- Alternate name: Muggs McGinnis (1927–1936)
- Syndicate(s): Central Press Association (1927-1936); King Features Syndicate (1936–1974)
- Genre(s): Humor, Childhood

Muggs and Skeeter was an American gag-a-day daily comic strip by Wally Bishop which ran from 1927 to 1974. Originally titled Muggs McGinnis, it was syndicated by the Central Press Association and then King Features Syndicate.

== Publication history ==
The strip started out, syndicated by the Central Press Association, as Muggs McGinnis; it was a virtual clone, in character and tone, of the popular Percy Crosby strip Skippy (which was syndicated by King Features Syndicate).

In April 1936, the strip was taken over by King Features (by that point the corporate parent of the Central Press Association) and re-titled Muggs and Skeeter.

Comic strip historian Allan Holtz hypothesized that King Features bullpenner Bil Dwyer ghosted Muggs and Skeeter during World War II, while Wally Bishop was serving in both the Atlantic and Pacific theaters. Nonetheless, Bishop's name was the only one to ever appear on the strip.

Bishop continued to draw Muggs and Skeeter until 1974, when he retired the strip after a run of 47 years.

== Story and characters ==
The strip drew its material from everyday life, much of it from Bishop's own family. At first stories centered around Muggs McGinnis, notable for his striped shirt and sweater vest printed with a large letter M. Gradually, the strip introduced Muggs' younger brother Skeeter, and the boys' enormous dog Hoiman (e.g., "Herman" — Skeeter spoke with a Brooklyn accent). The children's primary caretakers were their grandparents.

As the years went by, the two boys aged to reach their teen years.

Because the comic was first published in 1927, the characters entered the public domain in 2023.

== Comic books ==
In the late 1940s/early 1950s, Muggs and Skeeter strips were reprinted in David McKay Publications' The Katzenjammer Kids comics and Atlas Comics' Super Thriller Comics.

== Archives ==
A collection of 450 Muggs and Skeeter original art strips are housed at University of South Florida St. Petersburg in the Special Collections and University Archives of the Nelson Poynter Memorial Library.
