= Wally Bishop =

American cartoonist (1905–1982)

- Wally Bishop
- Born: Wallace Bond Bishop; August 17, 1905 Normal, Illinois
- Died: January 15, 1982 (age 77)
- Area: Cartoonist
- Notable works: Muggs and Skeeter
- Spouse: Louise Carson (m. 1936–1982)

Wallace Bond Bishop (August 17, 1905 - January 15, 1982), better known as Wally Bishop, was an American cartoonist who drew his syndicated Muggs and Skeeter comic strip for 47 years.

== Biography ==
Born in Normal, Illinois, he grew up in Bloomington, Illinois, where he spent a summer working as a newspaper copy boy. He studied at the American Academy of Art in Chicago. He was awarded a contract with King Features Syndicate at age 19.

In 1927, influenced by The Gumps creator Sidney Smith (who also lived in Bloomington), Bishop began his comic strip Muggs McGinnis (distributed by the Central Press Association) at the age of 22. In 1928, he visited St. Petersburg, Florida, and he later moved there from New York. He married Louise Carson in Evansville, Indiana, in 1936, the same year his strip was retitled Muggs and Skeeter. (Syndication of the strip was eventually taken over by King Features.)

In 1938, the Bishops bought and restored St. Petersburg developer C. Perry Snell's historic Italianate villa at 375 Brightwaters Boulevard in St. Petersburg. Their nearby neighbor was cartoonist Billy DeBeck, who lived within walking distance at 321 Brightwaters Boulevard on Coffee Pot Bayou.

During World War II, Bishop was a Coast Guard pilot, and he later transferred to the Navy, serving in both the Atlantic and Pacific theaters, leaving the service as a lieutenant commander.

Bishop sometimes performed as a drummer. He also emceed charity and benefit shows and gave chalk talks.

Bishop was a fellow of London's Royal Academy of Arts. He helped found the St. Petersburg Museum of Fine Arts, and was a member of the National Cartoonists Society and Sigma Delta Chi.

Bishop continued to draw Muggs and Skeeter until 1974, when he retired.

== Death and family ==
He died in 1982. Louise Bishop died in August 2005. Their daughter, Mary Joan Mann, grew up in the Brightwaters house, where she and Sam Mann Jr. had their wedding reception in 1948. A distinctive St. Petersburg landmark, the house sold for $5.1 million in 2006.

== Archives ==
A collection of 450 Mugs and Skeeter original art strips of Bishop's are housed at University of South Florida St. Petersburg in the Special Collections and University Archives of the Nelson Poynter Memorial Library.
