= Soda shop =

Type of restaurant

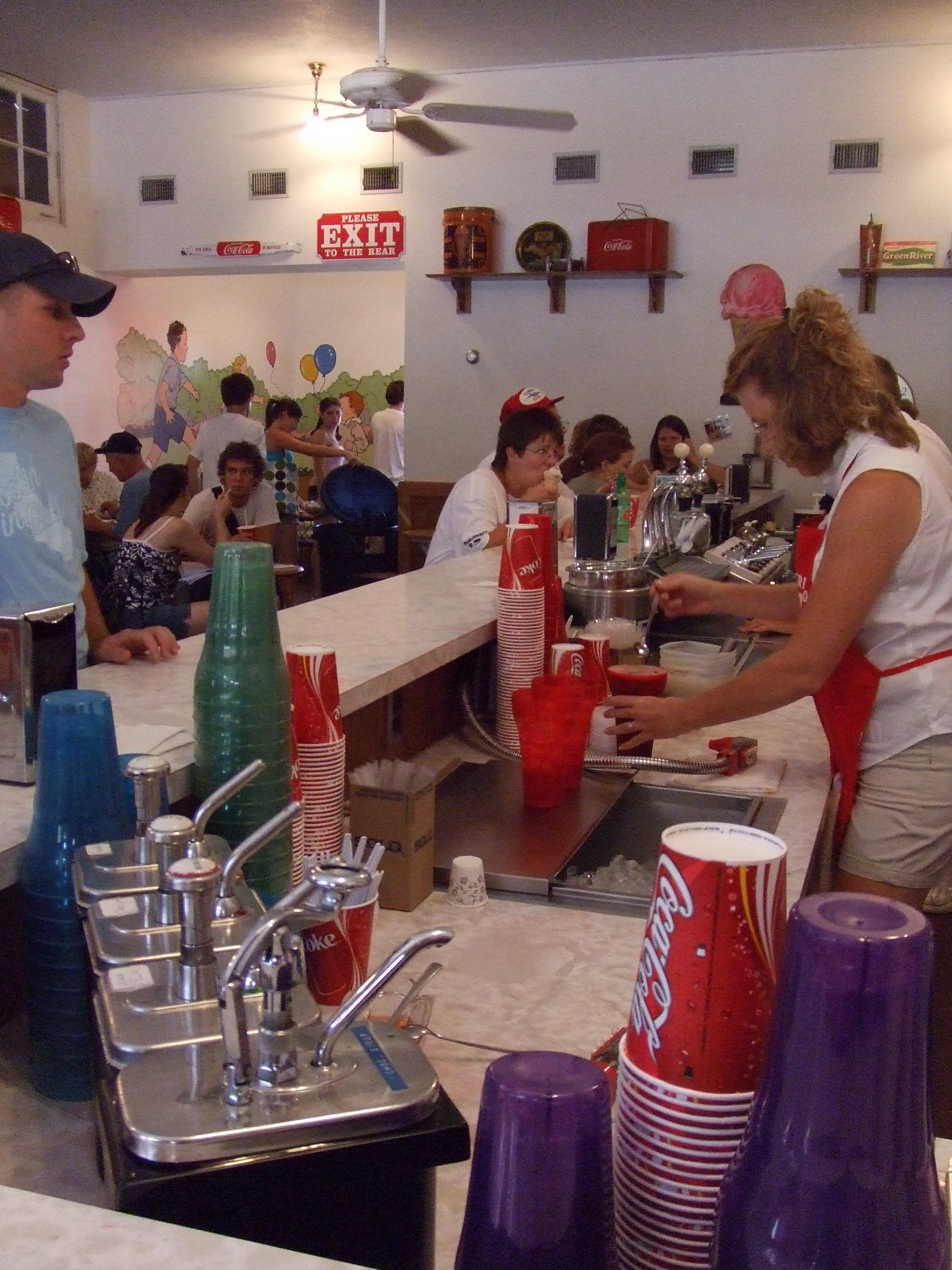
Soda shop in Iowa State Fairgrounds, Iowa

A soda shop, also often known as a malt shop (after malted milk) and as a malted shop, is a business akin to an ice cream parlor and a drugstore soda fountain. Their interiors are often furnished with a large mirror behind a marble counter with goose-neck soda spouts, plus spinning stools, round marble-topped tables, and wireframe sweetheart chairs.

== History ==
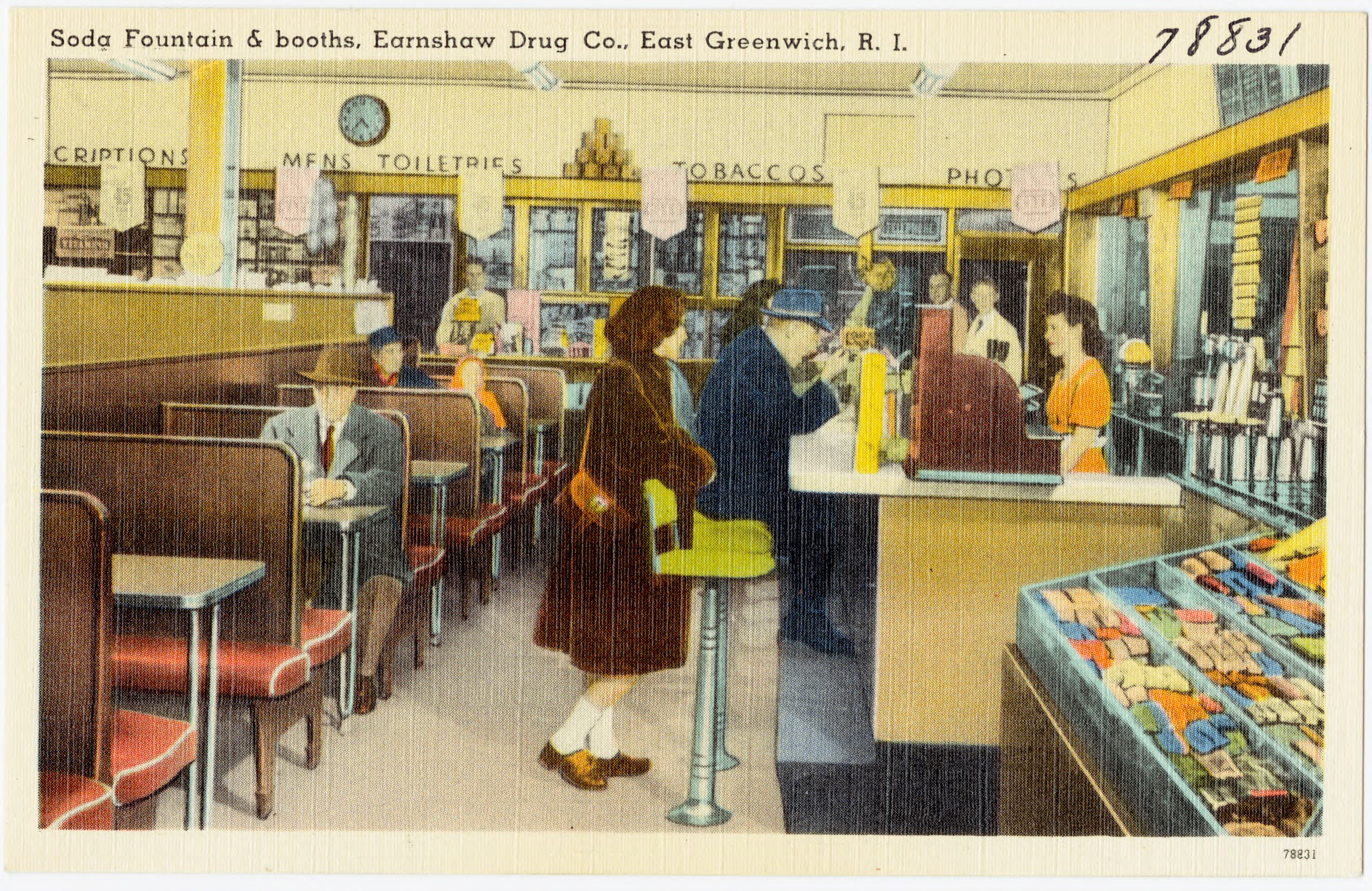
Drugstore fountain c. 1948

The counter-service soda fountain was introduced in 1903. Around that time, drugstores began to attract noontime customers by adding sandwiches and light lunches. The beverage menu at a soda shop usually included ice cream sodas, chocolate malts, fountain colas, and milkshakes.

In the first decades of the 20th century, the shops were also considered sober alternatives to bars as social venues.

== In popular culture ==
During the 1930s and 1940s, the jukeboxes in such establishments made them popular gathering spots for teenagers, as noted in the 1940s song "Jukebox Saturday Night" (tune by Paul McGrane and lyrics by Al Stillman):

Moppin' up soda pop rickies
To our hearts' delight,
Dancing to a swingeroo quickie,
Jukebox Saturday night...

Pop Tate's Chocklit Shoppe is a fictional soda shop created by Bob Montana as a setting for the characters in his Archie comic books and comic strips. It was based on real-life locations frequented by teenagers in Haverhill, Massachusetts in the 1930s, the Crown Confectionery and the Chocolate Shop on Merrimack Street, and the Tuscarora on Winter Street; and the character of Pop Tate was inspired by the Haverhill shops' Greek immigrant owners. In the years 1936 to 1939, when Montana went to high school in Haverhill, he joined his friends at the Chocolate Shop counter and made sketches on napkins. A decade prior to Archie, the Sugar Shop was a hangout for the teenagers in Carl Ed's comic strip Harold Teen.

Soda shops are often settings in films and TV shows, including the Archie Comics-inspired CW series Riverdale, where the Chocklit Shop serves the same role as it does in the comics. In The Twilight Zone's "Walking Distance" episode, a soda shop is a framing device and a link to the past for Martin Sloan (Gig Young). The popular TV show Happy Days took place in two main sets: the protagonist's home and a soda shop.

The shops appear in films including Harold Teen (1934), Orson Welles' The Stranger (1946), Has Anybody Seen My Gal (1952) and Pleasantville (1998). The gang from Scooby-Doo are often seen frequenting a malt shop. A malt shop also plays a key point in Blast from the Past, reflecting changes in the surface world while the main characters are underground, unaware of what has happened.

The protagonist of the young adult science fiction novel Have Spacesuit Will Travel by Robert A. Heinlein works in a drug store soda fountain.

== See also ==
- Milk bar
