= Marty Links =

American cartoonist

- Marty Links in 1954
- Born: Martha B. Links; September 5, 1917 Oakland, California
- Died: January 6, 2008 (aged 90) San Rafael, California
- Area: Cartoonist
- Notable works: Emmy Lou, Bobby Sox

Marty Links (September 5, 1917 – January 6, 2008) was an American cartoonist best known for her syndicated comic strip Emmy Lou.

== Biography ==
Born Martha B. Links in Oakland, California, she moved with her family to San Francisco, where she grew up. For six months she attended San Francisco's Fashion Art Institute, her only art training, and then began painting murals in the teenage departments of San Francisco department stores—the Emporium, the City of Paris and O'Connor Moffat. In 1940, she arrived at the San Francisco Chronicle where she drew for the "Women's World" department.

=== Comic strips ===
After landing an assignment to create fashion drawings for a major advertising campaign, she delivered her artwork to an ad agency account executive, who rejected the drawings and said, "This isn't what we want. These kids look more like bobby-soxers." The reaction gave her the idea for a cartoon character, and in 1944, she launched her comic strip Bobby Sox about a teenager named Mimi. It was distributed by Consolidated News Features. The Chronicle described Mimi as a "precocious sub-deb with a flair for trouble." Chronicle writer Carl Nolte noted the role of Links and her husband in San Francisco history:

Mimi, who had a pug nose and a short skirt, was a somewhat older version of Emmy Lou, the gawky teenager who could have been her younger sister. By 1946, Marty Links had drawn over 600 cartoons for the Chronicle, mostly about teenagers, had signed up with a syndicate and was a local celebrity. In the meantime, she had married Alexander Arguello, her high school sweetheart. He was a descendant of Jose Dario Arguello, a Spanish army officer who was commandant of the Presidio of San Francisco and a governor of Alta California. Jose's son was Luis Arguello, also commandant of the Presidio and a governor of California in the Mexican era. Arguello Boulevard in San Francisco and Point Arguello on the Southern California coast are named for the family.

Alexander Arguello died in 1966 after the couple had been married for 25 years.

=== Bobby Sox becomes Emmy Lou ===
Marty Links' Emmy Lou (November 14, 1966): "I suppose it's called 'mad money' because fathers always get so mad when you ask for some!"

As the footgear fashions of the 1940s became passe, the title Bobby Sox became outdated, so Links changed it to Emmy Lou, as noted by comics historian Don Markstein:

If you happen to be confused by the given name of the cartoonist, you're not alone. So, apparently, was the National Cartoonists Society, of which she was one of the first female members. Correspondence from the Society was addressed to "Mr. Marty Links" even after she'd given birth to her first child. She offered to send them her bust size. Like most slang describing teenagers, "Bobby Sox" was destined eventually to sound quaint. In 1951, when the term was still a couple of years away from the dustbin of history, Links renamed the feature after its star, Emmy Lou. Unencumbered by obsolescent expressions, she and her boyfriend, Alvin, continued in the same vein for decades.

Links had three children, and her daughters served as models for Emmy Lou. In 1954, Links lived at 215 32nd Avenue in San Francisco. In 1957, she described her working methods:

When I first started with the syndicate, I drew only daily panels. After we sold to a few papers, they asked for a Sunday page. This was impossible to handle alone, so Jerry Bundsen and Ted Martine came into my life. Jerry, who works for The San Francisco Examiner with Herb Caen, the columnist, has been writing my daily gags for 11 years. Once a week, he sends me a large batch of gags from which I select what I want and like. If there aren't enough to make up a week, I fill out with my own ideas—which drives Jerry mad! He claims if he sent me 60 gags I would be unable psychologically to select more than four out of the bunch. This isn't so at all. After selecting the four best gags, I pencil in the whole week of dailies. These go to Ted Martine, the world's best artist. (I should be working for him.) He inks in all the pencilled backgrounds. When they are returned I ink in the figures. I have pencilled them in rough enough so that I change as I go along. This keeps the action loose and fresh. In addition, I draw from models constantly, then use the sketches as reference. With the outlines of the furniture inked, for instance, I add details like prints and upholstery, flowers in bowls, fringe on curtains, etc. My husband claims I can't stand a plain white space. But it's this detail which gives a homey touch. As a matter of fact I draw all the furniture in our home. I often think I'd like to recover the worn up holstery in a Popsicle-colored background so the Popsicle stains will not show. As to the Sunday panels, these I dream up myself, and it is more work than everything else put together. I feel each idea is the last one I'll ever be able to eke out. Also I meditate (or should I say brood?) on my own girlhood, which was a long time ago, believe me. But once the mind starts going back, it's amazing how much it remembers.

The pilot for a proposed series based on Emmy Lou aired as a second-season episode of Mister Ed. The role of Emmy Lou was played by Noanna Dix. Her parents were played by George O'Hanlon and Jeff Donnell.

By the time her children became adults, Links felt the strip no longer represented teens, as she told columnist Caen, "Everything I know about teenagers today is unprintable." Thus, she brought Emmy Lou to an end in December 1979.

=== Hallmark ===
She then began doing ceramic sculptures and working for Hallmark as an illustrator of greeting cards, developing a group of child characters for a series called Kidlinks. At age 82, she retired from Hallmark.

During the 1990s, she lived at 64 Manzanita Way in San Francisco. She continued to do watercolor paintings until the last year of her life. She died on a Sunday, January 6, 2008, of heart failure at a San Rafael assisted living facility. She was survived by two daughters, Victoria Arguello of San Rafael, and Elizabeth Arguello of Albuquerque, New Mexico, and by six grandchildren.

== Bibliography ==
A hardcover collection, Bobby Sox: The Life and Times of Emmy Lou, was published by Hawthorn Books in 1954, with Popular Library publishing the paperback edition. This was followed by More Bobby Sox: The Life and Times of Emmy Lou (Popular Library, 1957) and Emmy Lou (1970).

== See also ==
- Aggie Mack
- Etta Kett
- Hal Rasmusson
- Harold Teen
- Penny
