= Hal Rasmusson =

American cartoonist (1900–1962)

- Born: January 11, 1900 Crookston, Minnesota, U.S.
- Died: 1962 (aged 61–62)
- Area: Cartoonist
- Notable works: Aggie Mack

Hal Rasmusson (January 11, 1900 – 1962) was an American cartoonist best known for the comic strip Aggie Mack, about a teenage girl.

Born in Crookston, Minnesota, Rasmusson grew up in Minneapolis, where he attended the Minneapolis School of Art for two years. He started his career doing fashion illustration. Moving to Chicago, he freelanced for several years, eventually taking a job creating greeting cards for Gibson Cards in Cincinnati for five years. He received the credit line "by Hal Rasmusson" on the back of his Gibson Cards.

After Rasmusson married, he moved to New York where he worked as an art director for five years. Returning to Minneapolis, he spent nine years as art director of greeting cards with the Buzza Company.

== Comic strips ==
He launched Aggie Mack with the Chicago Tribune Syndicate in 1946. Comics historian Eric Agena described Rasmusson's characters:

Aggie Mack was created by Hal Rasmusson in 1946, and appeared in the Chicago Tribune until the end of the 1950s. It was a gag-a-day strip based mainly on the everyday life of teenagers, with the star being a cute blonde named Aggie Mack. There were also numerous supporting characters, with a lot of the guys having real "hip" names like Animal, Wayout and Swinger. The series enjoyed great success in France, where it first appeared in Fillettes in 1947. In 1960, Gérard Alexandre, who signed with the pseudonym AL.G., created a French version of the strip based on Rasmussen's creation and called it simply Aggie. Back in the United States, the series was taken over by Roy Fox after Rasmusson's death in 1962. In 1966, the name of the American strip was shortened to Aggie and continued to run until its demise in 1971.

Rasmusson also drew the accompanying strip Honey Bun until 1953.

== Books ==
He wrote and illustrated instructional art books for publisher Walter T. Foster, including Comics and Modern Cartoon (1950).

The Aggie Mack comic book was published in 1948–49 by Superior Comics Ltd. at 28 East 10th Street, New York 3, New York with executive offices at 2382 Dundas Street, Toronto, Canada. Robert W. Farrell was the managing editor with editor Ruth Roche and art director S. M. Iger. Superior Comics published eight issues between January, 1948 and August, 1949. In 1962. Dell Comics adapted Aggie into an issue of their Four Color Comics.

== See also ==
- Carl Ed
- Harry Haenigsen
- Marty Links
- Hilda Terry
