= Harold Teen (radio program) =

American radio program

- Genre: Teenage comedy
- Running time: 15 minutes
- Country of origin: United States
- Language: English
- Home station: WGN (1931-1932)
- Syndicates: Mutual (1941-1942)
- Starring: William Farnum (1931-1932); Charles Flynn (1941-1942); Eddie Firestone Jr. (1941-1942)
- Announcer: Pierre Andre (1931-1932)
- Written by: Blair Walliser; Fred Kress
- Original release: 1931 – 1942

Harold Teen is a teenage comedy old-time radio program in the United States. It was broadcast initially on WGN in Chicago, Illinois, and a decade later was heard nationally on the Mutual Broadcasting System.

== Format ==
Based on the Harold Teen comic strip, the program's episodes centered around the adventures of the title character and his friends. Other characters included best friend Shadow Smart, girlfriend Lillums Lovewell and Cynthia (who had a crush on Harold). Harold's and Beezie's fathers were the adult characters, while Beezie and Josie were two of Harold's friends.

The WGN version was broadcast in 1931-1932, and the Mutual version in 1941-1942. (Although the preceding reference lists 1931-1932 for the initial run of the program, an article in the October 19, 1930, issue of the Chicago Tribune says, "... the radio audience has taken the broadcast version of Harold Teen as closely to its heart as the dashing cartoon creation of Carl Ed ...") The Harold Teen character appeared on radio again in 1948 in two genres.

=== The Teen-Agers Quiz Club ===
In 1948, WGN broadcast The Teen-Agers Quiz Club, a program that featured competition between a team of three boys and a team of three girls, all chosen from the teenage audience. Harold Teen headed the boys' team, and Sheila John Daly (a teenage columnist for the Chicago Tribune) headed the girls' team.

=== Swinging at the Sugar Bowl ===
Swinging at the Sugar Bowl featured Harold Teen as a disc jockey with music "expertly selected for 'teen-age taste'". Other characters from the comic strip also occasionally appeared on the program. Fred Reynolds (son-in-law of Teen's creator, Carl Ed) portrayed Harold Teen on the disc-jockey program. The program's debut occurred on April 3, 1948, the same day that the comic strip had Teen begin a new adventure as a disc jockey, "paralleling Harold's grafic [sic] adventures".

== Personnel ==
=== WGN ===
Characters and the actors who portrayed them included those shown in the table below.

Character	Actor
Harold Teen	William Farnum
Lilacs	Wally Colbath
Bezie	Jack Spencer
Giggles	Ireene Wicker
Lillums	Eunice Yankee

Source: Encyclopedia of American Radio, 1920-1960, 2nd Edition

The supporting cast included Eddie Firestone Jr., Charles Flynn, Rosemary Garbell, Bob Jellison, Marvin Miller, Loretta Poynton, Beryl Vaughn and Willard Waterman. Writers were Blair Walliser and Fred Kress. Pierre Andre was the announcer.

=== Mutual ===
Characters and the actors who portrayed them included those shown in the table below.

Character	Actor
Harold Teen	Charles Flynn; Eddie Firestone Jr.
Shadow Smart	Bob Jellison
Lillums	Loretta Poynton; Eunice Yankee
Josie	Rosemary Garbell
Beezie Jenks	Marvin Miller
Harold's father	Willard Waterman
Beezie's father	Jack Spencer
Cynthia	Beryl Vaughn

Source: Radio Programs, 1924-1984: A Catalog of More Than 1800 Shows, except as noted.

Blair Walliser was the director. He and Fred Kress were writers for the program.
