= MEDL Mobile =

- Industry: Mobile application development and mobile marketing
- Founded: 2008
- Headquarters: Irvine, California, United States

MEDL Mobile Inc. is an American mobile application developer and mobile marketing firm currently based in Irvine, California. The company designs, develops, and markets mobile apps for iPhone/iPod Touch, iPad and Android.

== History ==
Founded in 2008 by Dave Swartz and Andrew Maltin, MEDL Mobile began as a mobile app development startup and technology incubator in Fountain Valley, California. In early 2009, the company launched an app development service called the App Incubator, which lets users submit mobile application ideas in exchange for a percentage of the app's profits once it's developed. Soon after, the company grew from a handful of people to a full staff of designers, developers, engineers, marketers, architects, and producers.

In September 2010, the company moved their headquarters north to Fountain Valley, California - where in June 2011, they became an over-the-counter (finance) quoted company under the stock symbol: MEDL. In November, 2012, the company formed Hang With, Inc. a live social mobile video platform. In November 2013 an opinion piece on the stock market analysis website Seeking Alpha claimed that MEDL Mobile was making elaborate claims through press releases as a part of a pump and dump scheme with its company stock. In October 2014, Hang was awarded the Best Mobile Platform Innovation by the 2014 Digiday Sammy / Mobi Awards. On March 4, 2015, Hang With, Inc. (a MEDL company), announced that American actor and singer-songwriter Jared Leto had joined the Board of Advisors of Hang w/.
