= Hal Le Roy =

American actor

- Born: John LeRoy Schotte; December 10, 1913; Cincinnati, Ohio, United States
- Died: May 2, 1985 (aged 71); Hackensack, New Jersey, United States
- Other names: Hal LeRoy; Hal Leroy; Harold Teen
- Occupations: Actor; dancer; singer
- Years active: 1928–1982
- Spouse: Ruth Hedwig Dod

Hal Le Roy (December 10, 1913 – May 2, 1985) was an American tap dancer, actor, and singer appearing on stage, in film, and on television.

== Life and career ==
Hal Le Roy was born John LeRoy Schotte in Cincinnati, Ohio, on December 10, 1913. He danced in amateur productions as a youth, spurring his mother to take him to New York. His dancing teacher, Ned Wayburn, got him his first job, in Hoboken Hoboes in 1928.

The tall, gangling Hal Le Roy had a distinctive dancing style combining conventional tap with eccentric legomania, with his legs and feet twisting and turning energetically at crazy angles. Le Roy quickly worked his way into Broadway roles, where his flamboyant style created a sensation in the 1931 Ziegfeld Follies. In September 1931 Vitaphone, the short-subject division of Warner Bros. hired him for a single film, the one-reel (10-minute) musical The High School Hoofer. This was essentially an audition film, testing Le Roy as a screen personality. His dancing was practiced but his delivery of dialogue was not, and in his first film he was very awkward, reciting his dialogue syllable by syllable, without natural inflection. The film cast him as a bashful teenager, so the halting dialogue delivery got by. Variety noticed Le Roy's "poor camera presence" but other reviewers didn't care, as noted by Screenland Magazine: "Hal Le Roy does some of his spectacular dancing. The story isn't much -- but Hal Le Roy is!" Vitaphone liked his act, and promoted him immediately to its more expensive two-reel (20-minute) musicals. His seven-year contract ran through 1939, by which time Vitaphone was using the Hal Le Roy shorts to showcase promising ingenues June Allyson and Betty Hutton.

All 17 of Hal Le Roy's Vitaphone shorts were filmed in New York, leaving Le Roy free to accept stage engagements. In October 1932 he appeared at the Fox Theatre in Philadelphia. A Motion Picture Herald reviewer caught the act: "Tap dancer extraordinary of Ziegfeld's Follies, Hal Le Roy is rewarded with a burst of applause for 10 minutes' fast footwork. He responds with an encore that is even more of a success."

Warner Bros. wanted to adapt the popular Harold Teen comic strip as a feature film, but had trouble casting it. Someone remembered that Hal Le Roy was already under contract to the studio, and the youthful Le Roy (then age 20) was brought to Hollywood. He was still more of a dancer than an actor, so Harold Teen (filmed in November 1933, released in 1934) did not lead to more feature-film assignments. He wouldn't appear in another feature film until 1937, when he was featured as a specialty in Columbia's all-star college musical Start Cheering (released in 1938).

== Other projects ==
Aside from his work on Broadway and in film, he performed in revues and vaudeville, and as a featured entertainer on New York's nightclub scene. He was selected as a featured performer by Bob Hope for Hope's first appearance on television. In 1954, Le Roy was cast in the pilot film for the Blondie television series based on the comic strip with Hal Roach, Jr. producing. While he resembled Arthur Lake, who starred in the long-running Columbia movie series, Le Roy's characterization was seen as uneven and awkward. The series was revised three years later and recast, recalling Lake to reprise his original role as Dagwood Bumstead. The series ran for one season on NBC, going to syndicated reruns for a short period afterward.

== Personal life ==
On April 12, 1934, he married Ruth Hedwig Dod (March 13, 1911 – July 1, 1979), who had been one of his dance partners.

Hal Le Roy died on May 2, 1985, in Hackensack, New Jersey, of complications following heart surgery. With his wife predeceasing him, he left no descendants and was interred in a private funeral.

In 2021 Le Roy was inducted posthumously into the International Tap Dance Hall of Fame.

== Broadway ==
- The Gang's All Here (1931)
- Ziegfeld Follies of 1931 (1931)
- Strike Me Pink (1933)
- Thumbs Up! (1934–1935)
- Too Many Girls (1939–1940)
- Count Me In (1942)

== Complete Filmography ==
- The High School Hoofer (1931 short) as Hal Le Roy
- Tip Tap Toe (1932 short) as Hal Evans
- The Way of All Freshmen (1933 short) as Hal
- Use Your Imagination (1933 short) as Hal
- Mr. Broadway (1933) as Hal Le Roy
- Picture Palace (1934 short) as Hal
- Hollywood Newsreel (1934 short) as Himself (uncredited)
- Wonder Bar (1934) as dancer in blackface
- Harold Teen (1934) as Harold Teen
- Private Lessons (1934 short) as Hal Le Roy
- Syncopated City (1934 short) as Hal Le Roy
- In the Spotlight (1935 short) as Hal
- Main Street Follies (1935 short) as Hal
- Oh, Evaline! (1935 short) as Hal
- Wash Your Step (1936 short) as Hal Rogers
- Rhythmitis (1936 short) as Hal Le Roy
- Swing for Sale (1937 short)
- Ups and Downs (1937 short) as Hal Smith
- Start Cheering (1938) as 'Tarzan' Biddle
- The Prisoner of Swing (1938 short) as Rudolph, King of Sulvania, and Mr. Razzenstill
- The Knight Is Young (1938 short) as Hal
- Public Jitterbug No. 1 (1939 short) as Hal Sturges
- Too Many Girls (1940) as Al Terwilliger
- The Star-Spangled Revue (1950 TV movie) as Himself
