= Too Many Girls (musical) =

- Cover of sheet music (cropped)
- Music: Richard Rodgers
- Lyrics: Lorenz Hart
- Book: George Marion Jr.
- Productions: 1939 Broadway

Too Many Girls is a Broadway musical comedy which was adapted for a 1940 film version starring Lucille Ball. The original Broadway production is noteworthy for advancing the career of musician Desi Arnaz. The music was composed by Richard Rodgers, the lyrics by Lorenz Hart, and the book was by George Marion, Jr.

== Broadway ==
Too Many Girls opened on Broadway on October 18, 1939, at the Imperial Theatre, running to April 21, 1940, and transferred to the Broadway Theatre on April 22, 1940, closing on May 18, 1940. The cast featured Desi Arnaz, Diosa Costello, Marcy Westcott, Eddie Bracken, Richard Kollmar, Van Johnson, and Hal Le Roy. Directed by George Abbott, the Musical Staging was by Robert Alton, scenery by Jo Mielziner, and costumes by Raoul Pène Du Bois.

The musical takes place in Skowhegan, Maine and Pottawatomie College in Stop Gap, New Mexico.

== Film ==
Arnaz and Bracken repeated their roles in the 1940 RKO Radio Pictures film version. The film cast also featured Lucille Ball, Richard Carlson, Ann Miller, and Van Johnson

== Songs ==
Act I

- "Heroes in the Fall" - Second Robin Hood and Squad
- "Tempt Me Not" - Manuelito, Clint Kelley, First Co-Ed, Second Co-Ed, Third Co-Ed, Fourth Co-Ed, Fifth Co-Ed and Sixth Co-Ed
- "My Prince" - Consuelo Casey
- "Pottawattamie" - Harvey Casey and Mr. Lister
- "Pottawattamie" (Reprise) - Male Quartette and Ensemble
- "'Cause We Got Cake" - Eileen Eilers
- "Love Never Went to College" - Consuelo Casey and Clint Kelley
- "Spic and Spanish" - Pepe
- "I Like to Recognize the Tune" - Jojo Jordan, Consuelo Casey, Eileen Eilers, Clint Kelley and Al Terwillinger
- "Look Out" - Eileen Eilers and Company

Act II

- "The Sweethearts of the Team" - Eileen Eilers and Co-Eds
- "She Could Shake the Maracas" - Pepe and Manuelito
- "I Didn't Know What Time It Was" - Consuelo Casey and Clint Kelley
- "Spic and Spanish" (Reprise) - Pepe, Consuelo Casey, Eileen Eilers, Al Terwillinger, Clint Kelley, Jojo Jordan, Manuelito and Talullah Lou
- "Too Many Girls" - Manuelito
- "Give it Back to the Indians" - Eileen Eilers

== Recording ==
An LP studio recording was released in 1977, produced by Ben Bagley on Painted Smiles Records and featuring Estelle Parsons and Anthony Perkins.
