= Kate Osann =

American cartoonist

- Born: St. Louis
- Other names: Kate O'Sann; Kate O'sann
- Education: Hunter College
- Occupation: Cartoonist

Kate Osann was an American cartoonist. She created the comic strip Tizzy.

== Biography ==
Osann was born in St. Louis, Missouri, but grew up in New York City. She graduated from Hunter College.

== Career ==
Early in her career, Osann worked on ads and illustrating for such magazines as Collier's Weekly and Saturday Evening Post. Osann was a regular contributor to Collier's, where her panel style cartoon, Tizzy, first appeared. After the demise of Collier's Weekly in 1957, Tizzy cartoons ran with Newspaper Enterprise Association, until 1970.

Tizzy, the title character, was a stereotypical teen-aged American girl. In Collier's, the Tizzy cartoons were in color and Tizzy's hair was red. The syndicated cartoons were in black and white, and Tizzy's hair was blonde. When the color cartoons were reprinted in black and white in the first Tizzy paperback book, Tizzy's red hair was rendered as black.

Tizzy wore horn-rimmed glasses with triangular lenses. In the Collier's cartoons, the temples of her glasses were clearly visible. In the syndicated cartoons, the temples were rarely seen, and the frames appeared to be resting on her nose alone.

== Books ==
During the late 1950s and 1960s, three Tizzy paperback books were published: Tizzy: That Loveable, Laughable Teen-Ager (Berkeley, 1958), More Tizzy (Berkeley, 1958), and Tizzy (Scholastic Book Services 1967). Tizzy cartoons illustrated Baby-Sitter's Guide, by Sharon Sherman (Scholastic Book Services, 1969).

== "Kate O'Sann" ==
Three books were published in the 1970s with her name spelled with an apostrophe, "Kate O'Sann."

The book Men!, edited by Kitty Clevenger and Aileen Neighbors, was published by Hallmark Editions in 1974. It was illustrated by Kate O'Sann. The rear flap of the dust jacket was devoted to a self-portrait of Kate O'Sann, and a brief biography of her which reads in part, "Illustrator Kate O'sann, a native of Missouri, grew up in New York City, where she received her Bachelor of Arts degree from Hunter College and was a member of Phi Beta Kappa. She makes her home in Orlando, Florida, with her husband, William O. Chessman, and 'two large and vocal children' - William and Kathy."

The books Kid's Cookery and Things Girls Like to Draw were written and illustrated by Kate O'Sann. They were published in 1979 by International Media Systems, of Longwood, Florida.

O'Sann was written with a lower case letter "s" in Men!, but with a capital letter "S" in Kid's Cookery and Things Girls Like to Draw.
