= Don Markstein's Toonopedia =

Online encyclopedia

- Website type: Online encyclopedia
- Available in: American English
- Owner: Don Markstein
- Creator: Don Markstein
- Website: www.toonopedia.com
- Commercial: No
- Registration: No
- Launched: February 13, 2001; 25 years ago
- Content license: All rights reserved

Don Markstein's Toonopedia (subtitled A Vast Repository of Toonological Knowledge), or simply Toonopedia, is an online encyclopedia of print cartoons, comic strips and animation, initiated February 13, 2001. Donald D. Markstein, the sole writer and editor of Toonopedia, termed it "the world's first hypertext encyclopedia of toons" and stated, "The basic idea is to cover the entire spectrum of American cartoonery."

Markstein began the project during 1999 with several earlier titles: he changed Don's Cartoon Encyberpedia (1999) to Don Markstein's Cartoonopedia (2000) after learning the word "Encyberpedia" had been trademarked. During 2001, he settled on his final title, noting, "Decided (after thinking about it for several weeks) to change the name of the site to Don Markstein's Toonopedia, rather than Cartoonopedia. Better rhythm in the name, plus 'toon' is probably a more apt word, in modern parlance, than 'cartoon', for what I'm doing."

== Comic strips ==
Toonopedia author Donald David Markstein (March 21, 1947 – March 11, 2012) was fascinated with all forms of cartoon art since his childhood. During 1981, Markstein and his wife, GiGi Dane (August 7, 1949 – August 5, 2016), founded Apatoons, an amateur press association devoted to animation. He edited Comics Revue, a monthly anthology of newspaper comics, from 1984 to 1987, and 1992 to 1996. A writer for Walt Disney Comics, Markstein based Toonopedia on American and other English-language cartoons with the goal of developing the largest online resource concerning American cartoons. Toonopedia accumulated over 1,800 articles since its launch on February 13, 2001.

During 2002, Charles Bowen reviewing the site for Editor & Publisher, said,

For journalists researching stories, these online resources can be golden. A case in point is Don Markstein's simply amazing Toonopedia, a vast repository of information about comics, past and future. Now, honestly, unless you're a comic book collector or a cartoonist, you're probably not going to put this on your frequent filer's list. However, if you're working on a story that deals with pop culture, that focuses on a particular time period, or that touches on classic villains and superheroes, Don just might become your own personal hero. The site serves up illustrated entries on nearly every comic strip, cartoon, and comic book you can think of, from the world famous Blondie and Peanuts to those ultra-obscure strips, such as The Pie-Face Prince of Old Pretzelburg.

Markstein worked on the staff of the New Orleans Times-Picayune newspaper, writing feature stories for the Sunday magazine section. His freelance credits include weekly restaurant reviews for the Phoenix Business Journal, semi-annual previews of comic book publishing projects, science fiction convention program books, scripts for relaxation tapes and computer manuals. His comic book scripts are mainly for licensed characters, including Donald Duck, Mickey Mouse, Mighty Morphin Power Rangers and Eek! the Cat.

He provided editing, design and production for numerous publications, including Arizona Living, Arizona Women's Voice, Comics Interview, Comics Revue, Phoenix, Phoenix Resource, Louisiana Weekly Employer, Scottsdale and Sun Tennis.

In February 2011, Markstein, who had a history of strokes, suffered what his daughter called "an incident that caused him to be in and out of hospitals for several weeks", and the following month "suffered a massive stroke while in the hospital. This caused him to be paralyzed on his left side." He died of respiratory failure in March 2012. In 2012, Markstein's family announced plans to continue updating Toonopedia through new articles written by fans, but the site has not been updated since February 2011.

== Books ==
A Prince Valiant Companion, co-edited by Markstein

The subject matter of Toonopedia overlaps with the books Markstein wrote, edited and compiled. A Prince Valiant Companion (Manuscript Press, 1992), by Todd Goldberg and Carl J. Horak, was edited by Markstein and Rick Norwood. It includes plot summaries of the Prince Valiant comic strip from its beginning in 1937 to the 1980 retirement of the strip's creator, Hal Foster, along with additional material on the series and Foster's other work.

Hot Tips from Top Comics Creators (Fictioneer Books, 1994) is a 120-page collection of more 1,000 pieces of advice on the comic-book industry from the first ten years of Comics Interview, plus capsule biographies of 262 comics professionals.

== See also ==
- Billy Ireland Cartoon Library & Museum
- Dave Strickler
- List of newspaper comic strips
- List of online encyclopedias
