= Carl Ed =

American cartoonist

- Carl Ed and his characters in 1933
- Born: July 16, 1890 Moline, Illinois
- Died: October 10, 1959 (aged 69)
- Areas: Cartoonist, Artist
- Notable works: Harold Teen; Josie

Carl Frank Ludwig Ed (July 16, 1890 – October 10, 1959) was a comic strip artist best known as the creator of Harold Teen. His name is pronounced eed.

Born in Moline, Illinois, Ed graduated from Augustana College in Rock Island, Illinois. He was 22 years old when he worked on the baseball strip Big Ben in 1912.

Returning to Rock Island, he signed on as a reporter with the Rock Island Argus, where he was soon promoted to sports editor and then became the newspaper's city editor, while also drawing another baseball strip, Luke McGlook, the Bush League Bearcat (a.k.a. Luke McGluke), distributed by the World Color Syndicate. He moved on to Chicago as a sports cartoonist on the Chicago American where he also drew the strip The Tener Alley Gang.

== Harold Teen begins ==
Carl Ed's signature is at bottom right on this Milton Bradley board game from the 1920s.

He drew samples for a strip titled Seventeen, loosely based on Booth Tarkington's successful novel Seventeen. After publisher Patterson renamed it Harold Teen, it debuted in the New York Daily News during February 1919. Asked in the late 1930s why he had started the strip, Ed answered, "Twenty years ago, there was no comic strip on adolescence. I thought every well-balanced comic sheet should have one."

Carl Ed's strip was widely read in the 1920s, and his readers became familiar with such slang as "shebas", "sheiks" and "pantywaist". Some of these were words and phrases created by Ed, such as, "Fan mah brow."

With the popularity of the strip, Ed profited from merchandising of games, figurines and other products. He added Josie as a topper strip beneath Harold Teen and also found time to work as an instructor at the Chicago Academy of Fine Arts.

== Changing times ==
Interest in the strip began to fade by the 1940s. When Ed, who lived at 711 Michigan Avenue in Evanston, Illinois, died October 10, 1959, his once-popular comic strip died with him. (He retired in the last week of September 1959, and Harold Teen continued until his final strips ran out on November 18, 1959.) His widow, Ellen Ed, died in July 1975.

== Bibliography ==
Carl Ed drew this comics chronology of his strips from 1912 to 1919: Big Ben, Luke McGlook, the Bush League Bearcat (aka Luke McGluke), The Tener Alley Gang and Harold Teen. The center panel shows Robert S. Gable, the manager of World Color Syndicate.

- Ed, Carl. The Adventures of Harold Teen and His Old Side-kick Pop Jenks. New York: Cupples & Leon, 1931.

== See also ==
- Hal Rasmusson

== Sources ==
- Lambiek: Carl Ed
