= Pat Steward =

Canadian drummer and singer (born 1962)

Background information
- Born: May 4, 1962 (age 64); Vancouver, British Columbia, Canada
- Genres: Alternative rock; post-punk; power pop
- Occupations: Singer-songwriter; record producer; musician
- Instruments: Drums; vocals
- Website: www.oddsmusic.com www.sabian.com/sa/artist/pat-steward

Pat Steward (born May 4, 1962) is a Canadian drummer and singer who is a member of the band Odds, and has recorded and toured with Bryan Adams and Matthew Good, among many others.

== Early life ==
Steward was born in Vancouver, British Columbia, to British parents who had recently relocated to the west coast of British Columbia. The family moved around the west coast in his youth; he began high school in Thousand Oaks, California, and finished in Powell River, British Columbia. In high school, Steward was a keen student of the drums. At fifteen years old, he had a chance meeting with punk drumming pioneer Barry Taylor (K-Tels, the Young Canadians), and decided to hop on a Greyhound to Vancouver and hang out watching and sitting in as Barry and the Young Canadians played and rehearsed. In 1980, Steward enrolled in the jazz program at Malaspina College on Vancouver Island. There, he met bass player Doug Elliott and they began a long friendship and musical partnership.

== Career ==
In the early 1980s, Steward and Elliott performed together in the ska band Rubber Biscuit. In one of their shows, Steward was spotted by Bryan Adams and recruited to play on, and tour to promote, Adams' smash album Reckless (1984). Among many world tour stops Steward performed with Adams at Live Aid in 1985 and on the "Conspiracy of Hope Tour" for Amnesty International in 1986. Since Reckless, Steward also recorded with Adams on 11 (2008), Shine a Light (2019), So Happy It Hurts (2022), Roll with the Punches (2025), as well as two live albums recorded at Royal Albert Hall, released in 2023 and 2024. Steward returned to playing live with Adams since 2021.

During the late 1980s, Steward was in demand as a touring and session drummer for Jimmy Barnes, John Eddie, Doug and the Slugs, Raymond May and others. A chance call in 1994 from old pal Doug Elliott had him step in to replace departing drummer Paul Brennan in Warner Recording artists Odds. Elliott had been a founding member of Odds and the band was mid-way through recording their commercial breakthrough album Good Weird Feeling when Steward joined the band. Steward would go on to record, compose and tour with Odds until their hiatus in 1999. After that point he continued to collaborate with Odds members Craig Northey and Doug Elliott in several other bands: Stripper's Union, Northey Valenzuela, and as the "Craig Northey Power Trio".

Along with other members of Odds, he has frequently collaborated with members of Canadian comedy troupe The Kids in the Hall. He played on the soundtracks of the Kids in the Hall film Brain Candy and mini-series Death Comes to Town. He also played on Kids in the Hall member Bruce McCulloch's 2002 album Drunk Baby Project, and the soundtrack for a film he directed, Dog Park (1998).

Steward also began an association with Canadian guitarist Colin James and recorded and toured with James on and off for the better part of a decade. His Odds bandmates eventually joined him in the Colin James Band.

In 2003, Steward performed on the album Avalanche with popular Canadian rocker Matthew Good. He toured with Good and continued on for Good's 2004 "White Light Rock & Roll Review" and 2007's Hospital Music.

By 2007, Odds had reformed. Steward resumed his role in the band while continuing as a session player. In 2008, Odds released their fifth album, Cheerleader. While touring and recording with Odds, Steward also fit in a tour with the reunited Payola$ (Bob Rock and Paul Hyde’s alt-rock band) and albums for Colin James, Barney Bentall, Dustin Bentall, Bryan Adams, Jann Arden, Stripper's Union, Swan, Leeroy Stagger, Wil, and Ridley Bent. Odds released the album the Most Beautiful Place On Earth on February 2013.

Steward is also busy as a clinician and, through his association with the Sonor drum company and Sabian cymbal company, he frequently teaches and talks about what he does.

== Awards and honors ==
In 2012, Steward won the "Mike Norman All-Star Band – Drummer of the year" at the British Columbia Country Music Awards.

== Discography ==
=== Albums ===
- 1984: Bryan Adams: Reckless
- 1991: Chrissy Steele: Magnet to Steele
- 1991: Various Artists: Saturday Night Blues
- 1992: Doug and the Slugs: Tales from Terminal City
- 1991: Odds: Neopolitan
- 1993: Odds: Bedbugs
- 1995: Odds: Good Weird Feeling
- 1996: Odds: Nest
- 1999: Sharkskin: Sharkskin
- 2000: David Gogo: Change of Pace
- 2000: Odds: Singles Album
- 2001: Camille Miller: She Knows
- 2001: Wyckham Porteous: Sexanddrinking
- 2002: Allen Dobb: Bottomland
- 2002: Doug Cox: Stay Lazy
- 2002: Bruce McCulloch: Drunk Baby Project
- 2002: Various Artists: Women & Songs 6
- 2003: Matthew Good: Avalanche
- 2003: Northey Valenzuela: Northey Valenzuela
- 2004: Matthew Good: White Light Rock & Roll Review
- 2004: Various Artists: International Pop Overthrow
- 2005: Bryan Adams: Chronicles: You Want It, You Got It/Cuts Like a Knife/Reckless
- 2005: Bryan Adams: Anthology
- 2005: Odds: Essentials
- 2005: Colin James: Limelight
- 2005: Stripper's Union: Stripper's Union Local 518
- 2006: Barney Bentall: Gift Horse
- 2007: Id Guinness: Cure for the Common Crush
- 2007: Wil: By December
- 2007: Faber Drive: Seven Second Surgery
- 2007: Matthew Good: Hospital Music
- 2007: Ridley Bent: Buckles and Boots
- 2008: Bryan Adams: 11
- 2008: Cameron Latimer: Fallen Apart
- 2009: Dustin Bentall: Six Shooter
- 2009: Odds: Cheerleader
- 2009: Leeroy Stagger: Everything is Real
- 2009: Colin James: Rooftops and Satellites
- 2010: Ridley Bent: Rabbit on My Wheel
- 2010: Swan: Salt March
- 2011: Stripper's Union: The Deuce
- 2011: Small Sins: Pot Calls Kettle Black
- 2011: David Gogo: Soul-Bender
- 2011: Whitehorse: Whitehorse
- 2013: Odds: the Most Beautiful Place on Earth
- 2013: Matthew Good: Arrows of Desire

== Film and television ==
Year	Feature	Role	Company
1996	Kids in the Hall: Brain Candy	Studio Musician	Paramount Pictures
1998	Dog Park	Studio Musician	Sony Pictures Entertainment
2004	Corner Gas theme music	Drummer	CTV
2006	Kraft Hockeyville	On Screen Musician	CBC Television
2010	The Kids in the Hall: Death Comes to Town	Studio Musician	CBC Television
2010	The Brent Butt Comedy Special	On Screen Musician	The Comedy Network
