= Doug Elliott =

Canadian musician (born 1962)

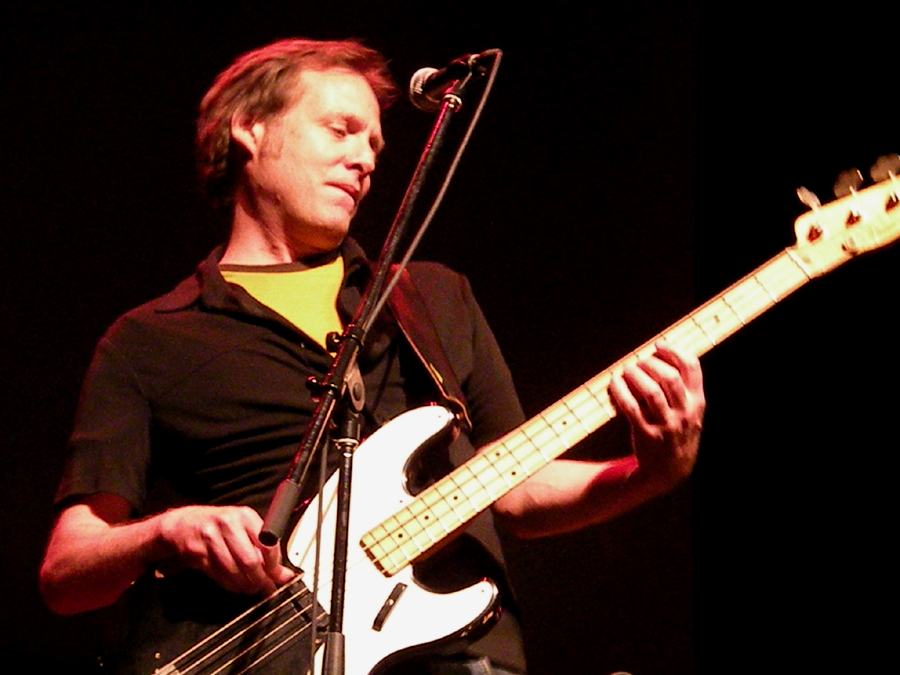

Background information
- Born: September 3, 1962 (age 63); Edmonton, Alberta
- Genres: Alternative rock, post-punk, power pop
- Occupations: singer-songwriter, record producer, musician
- Instruments: Bass guitar, vocals
- Website: www.oddsmusic.com

Douglas Robert Elliott (born September 3, 1962) is a Canadian musician best known for his work in the alternative rock group Odds. As a child growing up in the Rocky Mountain town of Jasper, Alberta, he took piano lessons and later played trombone and then bass in the Jasper Jr-Sr High School band. At the age of 14 he was playing professionally in local bands. Upon graduating high school in 1980, Elliott went to Malaspina University-College for two years and then to New York city to live with, and be mentored by his cousin, renowned jazz bassist Rick Kilburn (who was at that time playing with Chet Baker, Dave Brubeck and Mose Allison.). He then moved to Vancouver, British Columbia.

While in his first year at Malaspina College Elliott met drummer Pat Steward. The two struck up a working relationship that saw them perform as the rhythm section for several west coast bands before achieving some notoriety with the colourful Vancouver ska unit "Rubber Biscuit". In 1984, Bryan Adams recruited Steward for drum duties and their band "Rubber Biscuit" soon fizzled.

Elliott worked in several local bands and did sessions. In 1987, he briefly toured as bassist with "k.d. lang & the reclines" in support of her album Angel with a Lariat. Upon returning home to Vancouver he began writing and rehearsing with singer/guitarist Steven Drake and drummer Paul Brennan in hopes of forming a new band. Brennan brought in singer/guitarist Craig Northey and they made their live debut as "the Odds" in November 1987.

Odds eventually travelled to Los Angeles to make their mark and were signed by Zoo Entertainment/BMG. They released their debut album Neopolitan in 1991. Odds released three more albums eventually achieving platinum success in their native Canada and critical success worldwide.

Odds broke up in 1999 and Elliott continued to work with Northey and Steward on various film and recording projects. He performed live and recorded on Northey's solo debut Giddy Up and continued on with him for Northey Valenzuela (with Gin Blossoms Jesse Valenzuela) and Stripper's Union (with The Tragically Hip's Rob Baker). Elliott worked as live bassist for Long John Baldry and Jerry Doucette in this period and recorded with Canadian alt rockers Limblifter, as well as Spirit of the West's John Mann. From 2002 to 2011, Elliott worked as bassist in the Colin James Band, and rejoined Odds upon their reformation in 2008.

On February 21, 2013, Odds released an EP called The Most Beautiful Place on Earth.

== Discography ==
=== Albums ===
- 1991: Odds: Neopolitan
- 1993: Odds: Bedbugs
- 1995: Odds: Good Weird Feeling
- 1996: Odds: Nest
- 1996: k.d. lang/Various Artists: Best of Austin City Limits: Country Music's Finest Hour
- 1996: Kim Stockwood: Bonavista
- 1999: Sharkskin: Sharkskin
- 2000: Limblifter: Bellaclava
- 2002: John Mann: Acoustic Kitty
- 2002: Bruce McCulloch: Drunk Baby Project
- 2002: Various Artists: Women & Songs 6
- 2002: Camille Miller: She Knows
- 2003: Northey Valenzuela: Northey Valenzuela
- 2005: Colin James: Limelight
- 2005: Stripper's Union: Stripper's Union Local 518
- 2009: Odds: Cheerleader
- 2010: Swan: Salt March
- 2011: Stripper's Union: The Deuce
- 2011: Gerry Barnum: Step On It
- 2013: Odds: The Most Beautiful Place on Earth

== Film and television ==
Year	Feature	Role	Company
1989	Cousins	Actor/Musician	Paramount Pictures
1996	The Kids in the Hall Brain Candy	Studio Musician	Paramount Pictures
1998	Dog Park	Studio Musician	Sony Pictures Entertainment
2004	Corner Gas theme music	Bassist	CTV
2006	Kraft Hockeyville	On Screen Musician	CBC Television
2010	The Kids in the Hall in "Death Comes to Town"	Studio Musician	CBC Television
2010	The Brent Butt Comedy Special	On Screen Musician	The Comedy Network

== See also ==
- Canadian Rock
- Canadian blues
