= Craig Northey =

Canadian musician (born 1962)

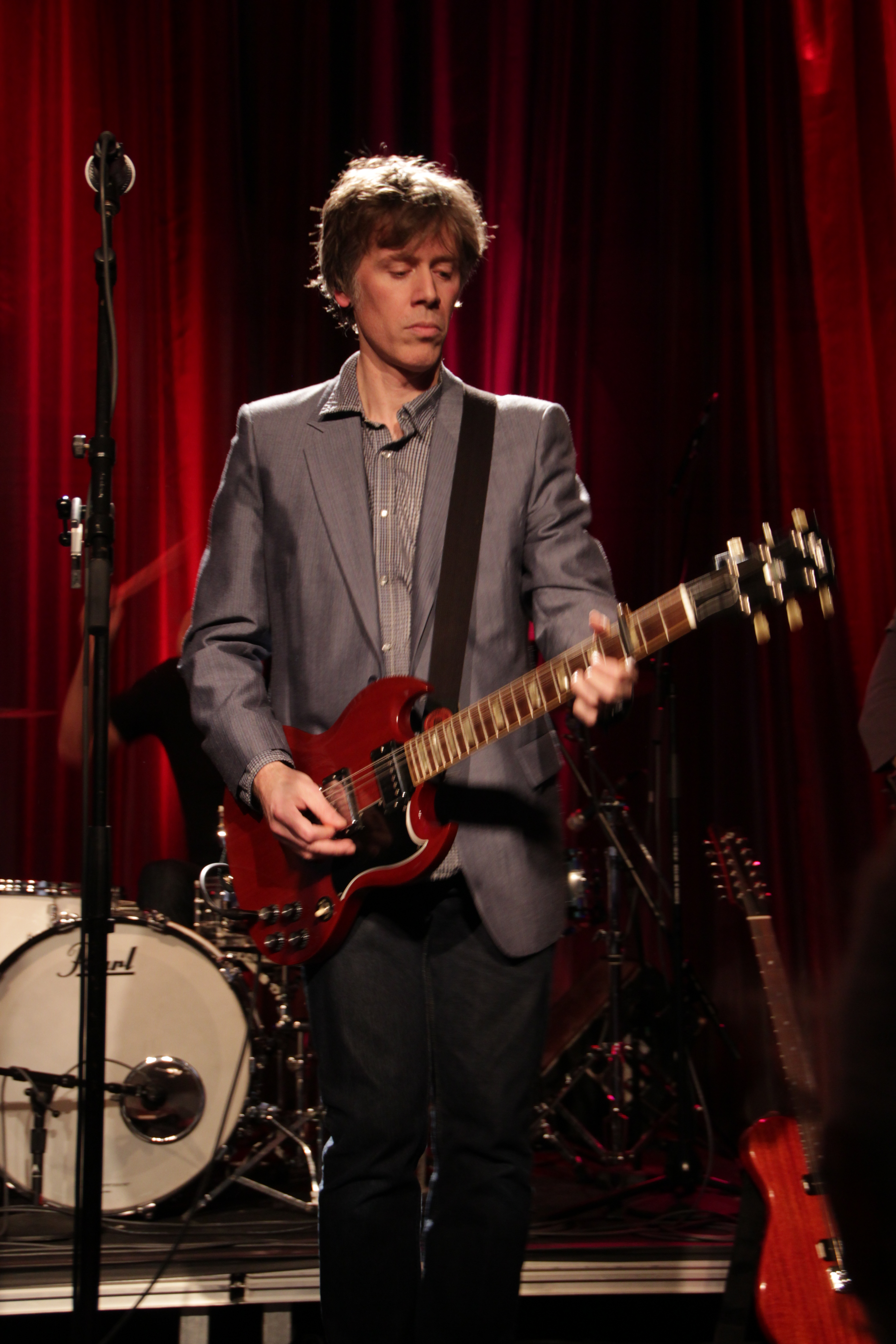
- Craig Northey performing at the CBC Toque Sessions

Background information
- Born: February 9, 1962 (age 64)
- Origin: Port Moody, British Columbia, Canada
- Genres: Alternative rock, post-punk, power pop
- Occupations: Singer-songwriter, record producer, musician, film and television composer
- Instruments: Guitar, vocals
- Years active: 1987—present
- Member of: Odds, Trans-Canada Highwaymen, Stripper's Union
- Website: oddsmusic.com

Craig Northey (born February 9, 1962) is a Canadian musician and film and television composer. He is one of the founding members of the band Odds, which released four albums between 1991 and 1996. They were best known for the radio singles "It Falls Apart", "Eat My Brain", "Heterosexual Man", and "Someone Who's Cool".

== Career ==
Like many musicians, Northey praises the Tragically Hip's generosity to up-and-coming bands, specifically the Odds: "Last year, they paid for us to come down to Seattle to see them play and then play ourselves...then, they invited us to play with them on Canada Day at Molson Park in Barrie. It really paid off for us." In 1996, Northey composed his first score for a feature film, The Kids in the Hall's Brain Candy.

In 1997, Northey wrote the entrance music for Bret Hart after he joined WCW.

After the breakup of Odds in 1999, Northey embarked on several other ventures, including working with Colin James, Rosanne Cash, Glen Phillips, Bruce McCulloch and many others. He released a solo CD entitled Giddy Up. In 2003, he collaborated on a CD with Jesse Valenzuela of Gin Blossoms, under the band name Northey Valenzuela.

In 2004, he was part of a side project, Stripper's Union, with Rob Baker, Doug Elliott, Simon Kendall and Pat Steward. The group produced an album, Stripper's Union Local 518, which was released in 2005.

With Valenzuela he co-wrote the theme "Not a Lot Goin' On" for the hit television comedy series Corner Gas. The song was later included on the Northey Valenzuela album.

When the Odds reunited in early 2007 they included the end credit theme from Corner Gas "My Happy Place" on their album Cheerleader.

Currently Northey, along with Murray Atkinson, Doug Elliott, and Pat Steward comprise the reunited Odds. Concurrently he has composed all the episodes for the Kids in the Hall's CBC/IFC series Death Comes to Town and CTV's Hiccups.

Northey continues to collaborate with other artists. He co-wrote songs on ex-Barenaked Ladies singer Steven Page's first solo album Page One and toured with Page in 2012. His collaboration with Rob Baker in Strippers Union yielded another album The Deuce in 2012.

In February 2014, Odds released an EP called The Most Beautiful Place on Earth.

After performing a show in Niagara in July 2016, Northey toured Canada in 2017 as part of The Trans-Canada Highwaymen with Page, Moe Berg of The Pursuit of Happiness and Chris Murphy of Sloan. In 2018, he composed and performed music for the web series This Blows, created by his children Cole and Aleita Northey.

== Associated acts ==
- Odds
- Stripper's Union
- Gin Blossoms
- Colin James
- Brent Butt
- The Kids in the Hall
- Rosanne Cash
- Trans-Canada Highwaymen

== Discography ==
=== With Odds ===
- 1991: Neopolitan
- 1993: Bedbugs
- 1995: Good Weird Feeling
- 1996: Nest
- 2009: Cheerleader
- 2013: the Most Beautiful Place on Earth

=== Solo ===
- 2002: Giddy Up

=== Collaborations ===
- 1999: Sharkskin: Sharkskin
- 2003: Northey Valenzuela: Northey Valenzuela
- 2005: Stripper's Union: Stripper's Union Local 518
- 2011: Stripper's Union: The Deuce

=== Writer ===
- 1997: Waltons: Empire Hotel
- 2000: Colin James: Fuse
- 2000: Paul Hyde: Living off the Radar
- 2000: Damhnait Doyle: Hyperdramatic
- 2000: Wide Mouth Mason: Stew
- 2001: Glen Phillips: Abulum
- 2001: Bruce McCulloch: Drunk Baby Project
- 2001: Waltons: Liv
- 2002: Jesse Valenzuela: Tunes Young People Will Enjoy
- 2003: Wide Mouth Mason: Rained Out Parade
- 2003: Colin James: Traveler
- 2003: Rosanne Cash: Rules of Travel
- 2003: Glen Phillips: Live at Largo
- 2004: David Gogo: Vibe
- 2004: Damhnait Doyle: Davnet
- 2004: Lulu: Back on Track
- 2005: Colin James: Limelight
- 2006: Colin James: Colin James & The Little Big Band 3
- 2006: Tom Wilson: Dog Years
- 2006: Rex Goudie: Under the Lights
- 2007: Liam Titcomb: Can't Let Go
- 2007: Jimmy Rankin: Edge of Day
- 2007: Adam Levy: Washing Day
- 2009: Jason Plumb & the Willing: Wide Open Music
- 2009: Colin James: Rooftops and Satellites
- 2010: Swan: Salt March
- 2011: Gin Blossoms: No Chocolate Cake
- 2011: Steven Page: Page One
- 2012: Steven Page: A Different Sort of Solitude

=== Film and television composer ===
- 1995: The Kids in the Hall in Brain Candy, Paramount Pictures
- 1996: Dog Park, Lions Gate Pictures
- 2002: The Kids in the Hall, Tour of Duty DVD
- 2004-2009: Corner Gas, CTV, theme music
- 2006: Kraft Hockeyville, CBC Television 7 episodes
- 2010: Kids in the Hall in "Death Comes to Town", CBC Television, 8 episodes
- 2010: The Brent Butt Comedy Special, The Comedy Network
- 2010-2011: Hiccups, CTV, 26 episodes
- 2011: Geofreakz, Teletoon, 20 episodes

== Personal life ==
Northey is the father of actress Aleita Northey, star of the CBC series This Blows.

== See also ==
- Canadian Rock
- Canadian blues
- Music of Canada
