= Heterosexual Man =

Single by Odds

from the album Bedbugs
- Released: 1993
- Genre: Rock
- Length: 3:35
- Label: Zoo Entertainment

Odds singles chronology
"Wendy Under the Stars" (1992)	"Heterosexual Man" (1993)	"It Falls Apart" (1993)

Music video
- "Heterosexual Man" on YouTube

"Heterosexual Man" is a song by Canadian rock band Odds. It was released in 1993 as the lead single from the band's second album, Bedbugs. The song reached No. 1 on the RPM Canadian Content chart. It was also the band's first song to receive significant radio airplay in the United States, peaking at No. 44 on the Radio & Records Album-oriented rock chart. The song was featured in the 1995 film, Jury Duty.

== Music video ==
The song's music video features the band members performing in drag, with Dave Foley, Kevin McDonald and Mark McKinney from The Kids in the Hall, themselves often noted for drag performances, as stereotypically macho jocks in the audience until Foley inexplicably turns into a woman.

== Track listing ==
Europe CD single

1. Heterosexual Man - 3:35
2. The Best Things - 3:43
3. Wendy Under the Stars - 4:09

== Charts ==
Chart (1993)	Peak position
Canada Top Singles (RPM)	60
Canadian Content (RPM)	1
US Album-Oriented Rock (Radio & Records)	44
