= Odds (band) =

Canadian alternative rock band

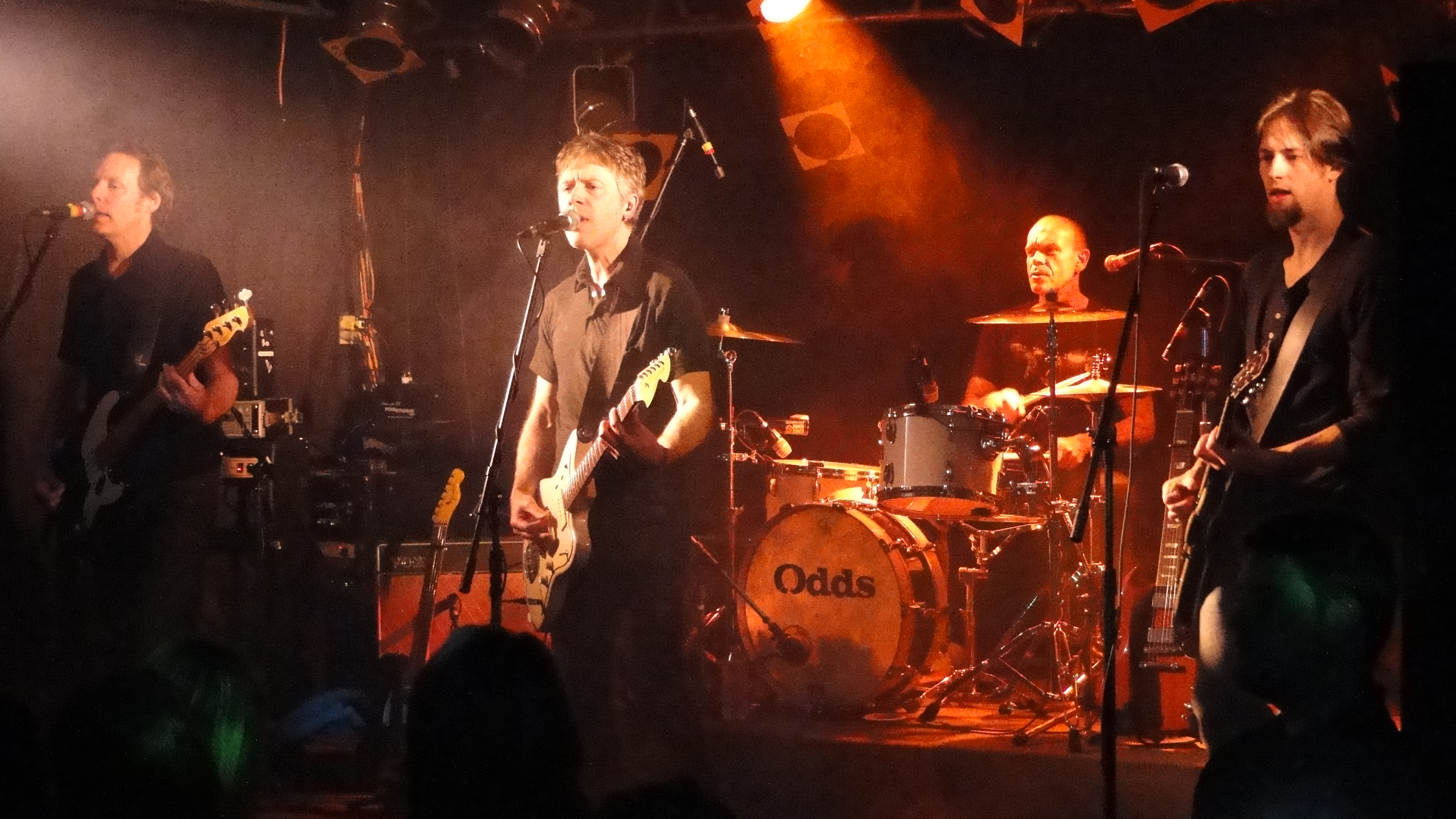
- Odds in 2011

Background information
- Origin: Vancouver, British Columbia, Canada
- Genre: Alternative rock
- Years active: 1987–2000; 2007–present
- Labels: Zoo, Elektra, Warner, Pheromone Recordings, Second Motion
- Spinoffs: Trans-Canada Highwaymen
- Members: Craig Northey; Doug Elliott; Murray Atkinson; Kurt Dahle
- Past members: Steven Drake; Paul Brennan; Pat Steward
- Website: oddsmusic.com

Odds are a Canadian alternative rock band based in Vancouver, British Columbia. They were nominated for six Juno Awards in the 1990s. As of 2014, they are on their fifth record label.

== History ==
=== Odds (1987–1999) ===
The band was formed in 1987 in Vancouver, British Columbia, consisting of vocalist-guitarists Craig Northey and Steven Drake (both of whom had led different bands appearing on a Vancouver music compilation album, Spotlight '86), bassist Doug Elliott and drummer Paul Brennan. Pat Steward was originally asked to be the band's drummer, but he declined. The band members claim the name came when Brennan asked Drake, in a town somewhere on the British Columbia coast, "What are the odds of us ever escaping bullshit gigs like this?"

In the late 1980s, the band played up to four nights a week as a 1960s and 1970s cover band called Dawn Patrol at the Roxy nightclub in Vancouver, while playing as Odds on weekends and funding their own demo recordings at Crosstown Studios in North Vancouver, hoping for a break. They travelled to Los Angeles doing showcases and eventually signed to Zoo Entertainment.

In 1991, they released their debut self-produced album Neopolitan, which spawned the radio hits "Love Is the Subject" and "King of the Heap" (both sung by Northey). The third single, the sexually explicit "Wendy Under the Stars" (sung by Drake), charted only on the RPM Canadian Content chart, but attracted the attention of American music critic Greil Marcus in his book Dead Elvis. After the release of Neopolitan, the band were picked up by Warren Zevon, becoming his touring band for his album Mr. Bad Example.

In 1993, Zevon returned the favour by guesting on the band's Bedbugs album. Its lead single was "Heterosexual Man". The video for that song featured the band members performing in drag, with Dave Foley, Kevin McDonald, and Mark McKinney from The Kids in the Hall, themselves often noted for drag performances, as stereotypically macho jocks in the audience until Foley inexplicably turns into a woman. Three more singles were released from the album: "It Falls Apart", "Jack Hammer", and "Yes (Means it's Hard to Say No)". "Jack Hammer" features a guitar battle between Robert Quine (Lou Reed, Richard Hell, Matthew Sweet, etc.) and Zevon.

In 1995, Brennan left the band, moving to Toronto during the recording of their third album, and subsequently joined Big Sugar. He was replaced by Pat Steward, who was a friend of Doug and former drummer for Bryan Adams. Good Weird Feeling, their most commercially successful album, included drum tracks from both Brennan and Steward. The album featured the top 10 hit singles "Truth Untold" and "Eat My Brain". "Satisfied" hit the top 20. "Mercy to Go" and "Smokescreen" also charted. "Eat My Brain" later found a place on the Craig Northey-produced soundtrack to The Kids in the Hall movie Kids in the Hall: Brain Candy. Northey composed the score for the movie along with Steward and Elliott.

In 1996, the album Nest was released. The albums's lead single, "Someone Who's Cool", originally intended for a sequel to the Friends soundtrack, peaked at No. 2 in their native Canada. In the U.S., it was a No. 6 hit at AAA radio, but was not a mainstream chart hit. It later was also used as the title theme for the short-lived CBS comedy Love Monkey. The follow-up single "Make You Mad" featured a video which was co-directed by and starred Bruce McCulloch of The Kids in the Hall. "Nothing Beautiful" was the third single.

Odds toured extensively during the 1990s, including as an opening act for The Tragically Hip and Barenaked Ladies. The band performed until 1999, headlining that year's Arts County Fair year-end concert at the University of British Columbia, but released no further new studio albums.

=== Hiatus (1999–2007) ===
In March 1999, Northey announced that he was leaving the band, although he continued to work with Elliott and Steward frequently in subsequent years. The band members pursued other projects after 1999, releasing a greatest hits/singles compilation in 2000, entitled Singles: Individually Wrapped. A second compilation, The Essentials, was released in 2005.

Later in 1999 Elliott, Steward and Northey teamed up with organist Simon Kendall (of Doug & the Slugs) to release an instrumental soul CD under the moniker Sharkskin. Drake followed up his previous work mixing The Tragically Hip's 1996 album Trouble at the Henhouse by furthering his career as a recording engineer and producer based in Vancouver. Drake later stated on a podcast that he was pushed out of Odds.

Northey released a solo album, Giddy Up, in 2002, and worked as a songwriter and producer for other acts (including Rosanne Cash) throughout the decade. In 2004, he collaborated with Gin Blossoms guitarist Jesse Valenzuela on the Northey Valenzuela album. The pair also recorded the theme song to the sitcom Corner Gas, "Not a Lot Going On". Northey, Steward and Elliott all recorded and toured with Rob Baker of the Tragically Hip as the band Stripper's Union, and continued to perform as the Craig Northey Power Trio, in addition to forming the core of the backup band for Canadian blues-rock guitarist Colin James.

In early 2006 Odds' song "Someone Who's Cool" was used as the theme song to the short-lived CBS music industry comedy Love Monkey, starring Tom Cavanagh, Jason Priestley, and Teddy Geiger.

=== New Odds and Odds again (2008–2014) ===
In 2007, Craig Northey, Doug Elliott, Pat Steward and new guitarist Murray Atkinson performed old and new songs on the Barenaked Ladies' "Ships and Dip" event aboard a cruise ship in the Caribbean Sea. They released a new album, Cheerleader, on May 20, 2008, with Northey now performing all lead vocals. It was the very first release by Kim Cooke's new label Pheromone Recordings. The first single, "My Happy Place," (used over the closing credits throughout the run of Corner Gas) was released in mid-March. As the band's right to "Odds" had lapsed, the album was released under the name The New Odds.

After resecuring the right to its original name, the band obtained U.S. distribution through independent record label Second Motion Records. A new EP, Noise Trade (named for the website used to sell it), comprising several songs from Cheerleader and covers of tunes from Pointed Sticks and Art Bergmann was prepared for early 2009 release. Early in the year, the band also appeared as themselves (in retro-1950s garb) during a dream sequence in the final season of the Corner Gas television series (series 6, episode 11). The band continued to perform regularly, mostly at festivals and events across Canada including such performances as on the 2009 and 2010 Canadian Pacific Holiday train. During the 2010 Winter Olympics in Vancouver, Odds were the "house band" at Canada Hockey House.

The band was named the Vancouver Canucks 'house band' of the 2010 and 2011 NHL playoffs. The Odds performed the theme music to the CBC/IFC television series The Kids in the Hall: Death Comes to Town.

Odds made several shorter-length record releases in later years. On February 21, 2013, Odds released an EP called The Most Beautiful Place on Earth. The five-song EPs Game Face On and Party Party Party followed in 2014. Steward returned to playing live with Bryan Adams in 2021. Kurt Dahle joined Odds in 2023.

=== Steven and the Evens (2024–) ===
In 2024, founding Odds member, co-frontman, singer, guitarist, and songwriter, Steven Drake, put together a new power trio called Steven and the Evens, performing Odds songs from the definitive lineup of the band (1987–1999), focusing on material from the first four Odds albums. The trio also features former Matthew Good Band drummer, Ian Browne, and Brad Ferguson. The band has primarily been playing around Vancouver, but is also part of the 2025 Atlin Arts & Music Festival lineup in Atlin, British Columbia.

== In pop culture ==
On December 3, 2021, Odds were mentioned in the song "Canada Loves You Back" by Steven Page, which he performed at the Governor General's Awards in honour of Ryan Reynolds.

== Discography ==
=== Albums ===
Year	Title	Peak chart positions	Certifications
Year	Title	CAN	CAN
1991	Neopolitan	–	
1993	Bedbugs	–	
1995	Good Weird Feeling	23	Platinum
1996	Nest	–	Gold
2000	Singles: Individually Wrapped	–	
2005	The Essentials	–	
2008	Cheerleader	–	
2009	Noise Trade EP	–	
2013	the Most Beautiful Place on Earth EP	–	
2014	Game Face On EP	–	
2014	Party Party Party EP	–	
2022	Universal Remote		
2023	Crash the Time Machine		

=== Singles ===
Release Year	Title	Peak chart positions									Album
Release Year	Title	CAN	CAN Alt	CAN Content (Cancon)	CAN Pop Adult	US Bubbling Under Hot 100	US AAA	US Alt	US AOR	US Rock	Album
1991	"Love Is the Subject"	43	-	2	-	-	-	-	-	-	Neopolitan
1991	"King of the Heap"	42	-	5	-	-	-	-	-	-	Neopolitan
1992	"Wendy Under the Stars"	-	-	5	-	-	-	-	-	-	Neopolitan
1993	"Heterosexual Man"	60	-	1	-	-	-	-	44	-	Bedbugs
1993	"It Falls Apart"	69	-	1	-	-	-	-	-	-	Bedbugs
1993	"Jack Hammer"	-	-	6	-	-	-	-	-	-	Bedbugs
1994	"Yes (Means It's Hard to Say No)"	60	-	1	-	-	-	-	-	-	Bedbugs
1994	"Love of Minds"	-	-	-	-	-	-	-	-	-	Bedbugs
1995	"Truth Untold"	15	-	4	-	-	-	-	-	-	Good Weird Feeling
1995	"Eat My Brain"	22	21	-	-	-	-	-	-	-	Good Weird Feeling
1995	"Satisfied"	29	19	-	-	-	-	-	-	-	Good Weird Feeling
1995	"I Would Be Your Man"	-	-	-	-	-	-	-	-	-	Good Weird Feeling
1996	"Mercy to Go"	26	-	*	-	-	-	-	-	-	Good Weird Feeling
1996	"Someone Who's Cool"	2	3	*	-	20	6	41	-	33	Nest
1997	"Make You Mad"	8	18	*	-	-	-	-	-	-	Nest
1997	"Nothing Beautiful"	73	-	*	54	-	-	-	-	-	Nest
2008	"My Happy Place"										Cheerleader

== Juno Award nominations ==
- Best New Group (1994)
- Best Rock Album (1996)
- Songwriter of the Year (1996, 1998)
- Group of the Year (1996)
- Best Video (Someone Who's Cool) (1997)

== Members ==
- Craig Northey – Lead vocals, guitar
- Doug Elliott – Bass, backup vocals
- Kurt Dahle – Drums
- Murray Atkinson – Guitar, backup vocals

=== Former ===
- Steven Drake - Vocals, guitar
- Paul Brennan - Drums, backup vocals
- Pat Steward – Drums, backup vocals

== See also ==
- Canadian rock
- Music of Canada
