= This Blows =

Canadian horror comedy web series

This Blows is a Canadian horror comedy web series, which premiered February 15, 2018 on the Canadian Broadcasting Corporation's digital platform. Created by Aleita Northey and Cole Northey, the series stars Aleita Northey as Anna Gowen, a young aspiring actress who suddenly develops the ability to make people explode when she's angry.

The cast also includes Michelle Thrush, Tracy Ryan, Darcy Michael and Bruce McCulloch. McCulloch is also a writer for the series, while music was composed and performed by Aleita and Cole Northey's father, Craig Northey of the band Odds.
