= Trans-Canada Highwaymen =

Canadian supergroup

- Origin: Canada
- Genres: Rock; pop
- Years active: 2016–present
- Members: Chris Murphy; Craig Northey; Steven Page; Moe Berg

Trans-Canada Highwaymen is a Canadian rock and pop supergroup that consists of Chris Murphy (Sloan), Craig Northey (Odds), Steven Page (ex-Barenaked Ladies), and Moe Berg (the Pursuit of Happiness).

The band was originally formed in 2016 as a touring-only project, with members staging collaborative concerts performing a "mixtape" selection of tracks originally recorded by their primary bands. Songs performed on the tour included Sloan's "Coax Me", "The Other Man", "The Rest of My Life", and "Underwhelmed"; Barenaked Ladies' "Jane", "Brian Wilson", "It's All Been Done", and "One Week"; Odds' "Someone Who's Cool", "Make You Mad", and "It Falls Apart"; and TPOH's "Hard to Laugh", "She's So Young", and "I'm an Adult Now".

After the COVID-19 pandemic put a halt to touring, they began to discuss recording an album and ultimately started to work on a collection of covers of Canadian pop and rock classics from the 1960s and 1970s by artists such as the Guess Who, Joni Mitchell, Michel Pagliaro, April Wine, Andy Kim, Lighthouse, the Poppy Family, Chester, Roy Forbes, and the DeFranco Family.

The album, Explosive Hits Vol. 1, was released in 2023 and was supported by a national tour. Later shows also introduced medley performances of other popular Canadian songs, such as Alanis Morissette's "Ironic", the Tragically Hip's "Poets", and Eight Seconds' "Kiss You (When It's Dangerous)".

A second album that would cover additional songs has been discussed and planned but has not been formally announced or released as of 2026.

In April 2026, they are slated to co-headline a "Great Canadian Sing-Along" concert at Fallsview Casino with Choir! Choir! Choir!

== Band members ==
- Chris Murphy – vocals, drums, bass, guitar
- Craig Northey – vocals, guitar
- Steven Page – vocals, guitar
- Moe Berg – vocals, guitar, bass

== Discography ==
- Explosive Hits Vol. 1 (2023)
