= Papillon (TV series) =

Canadian live action comedy series

Papillon is a live action comedy series (15 4-minute episodes) about an ultra-discount airline, starring Kevin McDonald of the comedy troupe The Kids in the Hall. The project was produced in 2011 as part of the first funded web series by the Independent Production Fund. Papillon is about the excruciating realities of modern air travel and features a motley crew led by cowboy pilot (David Fraser), his co-pilot (Kevin McDonald) with a debilitating fear of flying, and two flight attendants (Randal Edwards and Hannah Cheesman).

Written by Mark Steinberg, Kevin McDonald and Paula Blair and directed by Kent Sobey and Mark Steinberg. Produced by Kent Sobey and Catherine Tait, from Farmhouse Productions and Duopoly.

The series was available in Canada on Bite and iThentic.com and in the US on Hulu and Hulu Plus.

== Awards ==
Papillon was in the 2011 official selection at the New York Television Festival and nominated for a 2011 Digi Award.
