= Stripper's Union =

Canadian rock band

Stripper's Union is a Canadian rock band consisting of Rob Baker (vocals, guitar), Craig Northey (vocals, guitar), Doug Elliott (bass guitar), Simon Kendall (piano), and Pat Steward (drums). The band have to date released three albums in 2005, 2011, and 2021.

Northey, Elliott and Steward are all current members of Odds and Sharkskin. Kendall was formerly with Doug and the Slugs as well as Sharkskin. Baker was a member of The Tragically Hip. Many of the band's songs are written by Baker and Northey.

== History ==
In 2005, they released their debut album, Stripper's Union Local 518. It features songs recorded at The Bathouse Recording Studio in Bath, Ontario in December 2004. The Kids in the Hall member Dave Foley is listed as a co-writer of the song, "Give Up and Go Away", originally written for his wife, Crissy. "Give Up and Go Away" was released as a single and peaked at #9 on Canada's Rock chart.

In 2011, they released their second album, The Deuce, a mixture of blues, jazz and country rock tunes.

On February 5, 2021, after a 10-year hiatus, a third album, titled The Undertaking, was released.

== Stripper's Union Local 518 ==
Stripper's Union Local 518

Studio album by Stripper's Union
- Released: May 7, 2005
- Recorded: 2004
- Genre: Rock
- Length: 46:48
- Label: Universal Music Canada
- Producer: Rob Baker, Craig Northey

Professional ratings
Review scores
Source	Rating
Canoe.ca	3.5/5 stars

Stripper's Union Local 518 is the debut album of the Stripper's Union. It was recorded at The Bathouse Recording Studio in Bath, Ontario, in December 2004.

=== Track listing ===
1. "Shake It Off (Walking With The King of Funk)" – 3:23
2. "Full Flow Angry Boy" – 3:08
3. "No One's Watching" – 3:29
4. "Bullet Proof White Limo" – 3:48
5. "Lost Lost Highway" – 4:34
6. "Everybody Knows The Words" – 3:03
7. "Give Up And Go Away" – 4:02
8. "Local Bear" – 4:03
9. "Horses And Trains" – 3:15
10. "Nothing Can Bring You Back" – 2:44
11. "Sweet 'n Low" – 3:27
12. "The Radio (Foggy Hill)" – 3:16
13. "Wave After Wave (The Glowing Boat Companion)" – 4:31
