= Giddy Up =

Giddy Up, Giddyup, or Gitty Up may refer to:

- Giddy Up (album), a 2001 album by Craig Northey
- Giddy Up (EP), a 2016 album by Amyl and the Sniffers
- "Giddy Up", a song by Geggy Tah, 1993
- "Giddy Up", a song by NSYNC from NSYNC, 1998
- "Giddy Up", a song by Dragonette from Bodyparts, 2012
- "Giddy Up", a song by Fe, 2013
- "Giddyup", a song by Ricki-Lee Coulter from Dance in the Rain, 2014
- "Giddy Up!", a song by Shania Twain from Queen of Me, 2023
- "Gitty Up" (song), a song by Salt-n-Pepa from Brand New, 1997

== See also ==
- "Giddy On Up", a song by Laura Bell Bundy
- "Giddy Up a Ding Dong", a rock and roll song
