= Singles: Individually Wrapped =

Greatest hits album by Odds
- Released: October 2000
- Genre: Alternative rock
- Length: 60:00
- Label: WEA

Odds chronology
Nest (1996)	Singles: Individually Wrapped (2000)	Cheerleader (2008)

Singles: Individually Wrapped is a greatest hits album by Odds, released in 2000. The album contains singles from all four of the band's studio albums, as well as a rendition of the Christmas song "Kings of Orient" which the band recorded for the 1991 Christmas compilation A Lump of Coal. It was rated 3.5 stars by AllMusic.

== Track listing ==
1. "Someone Who's Cool" (3:17)
2. "Truth Untold" (3:55)
3. "It Falls Apart" (3:38)
4. "Love Is the Subject" (4:43)
5. "Jackhammer" (long version) (4:20)
6. "Satisfied" (3:00)
7. "Nothing Beautiful" (3:06)
8. "Eat My Brain" (4:26)
9. "Make You Mad" (4:07)
10. "Wendy Under the Stars" (4:15)
11. "Yes (Means It's Hard to Say No)" (single remix) (3:14)
12. "I Would Be Your Man" (3:26)
13. "King of the Heap" (single remix) (3:57)
14. "Heterosexual Man" (3:32)
15. "Mercy to Go" (5:18)
16. "Kings of Orient (We Three Kings)" (4:26)
