= Nest (album) =

Studio album by The Odds
- Released: November 5, 1996 (Canada); January 28, 1997 (United States)
- Recorded: at Mushroom Studios, Vancouver
- Genre: Alternative rock
- Length: 39:47
- Label: Elektra
- Producer: Nigel the Cat

The Odds chronology
Good Weird Feeling (1995)	Nest (1996)	Singles: Individually Wrapped (2000)

Singles from Nest
- 1. "Someone Who's Cool" Released: 1996; 2. "Make You Mad" Released: 1997; 3. "Nothing Beautiful" Released: 1997

Professional ratings
Review scores
Source	Rating
Allmusic	3.5/5 stars

Nest is the fourth studio album by Canadian rock band Odds. It was the band's last album until the release of Cheerleader in 2008.

"Someone Who's Cool" was the album's most successful single, peaking at #2 in Canada. The album's second single, "Make You Mad", was also a top 10 hit.

== Track listing ==
All songs written by Odds (Craig Northey, Doug Elliott, Pat Steward, Steven Drake)

1. "Someone Who's Cool" - 3:17
2. "Make You Mad" - 4:07
3. "Hurt Me" - 3:45
4. "Heard You Wrong" - 3:59
5. "Tears & Laughter" - 4:05
6. "Nothing Beautiful" - 3:07
7. "Say You Mean It Wondergirl" - 3:16
8. "Out Come Stars" - 4:24
9. "Night's Embrace" - 3:59
10. "Suppertime" - 3:51
11. "At Your Word" - 3:57
