= Kyle Smith (critic) =

American columnist and novelist (born 1966)

- Born: 1966 (age 59–60); East Longmeadow, Massachusetts, U.S.
- Education: Yale University (BA)
- Occupations: Critic; columnist; novelist
- Spouse: Sara Austin (m. 2007)
- Military career
- Allegiance: United States
- Branch: United States Army
- Rank: Lieutenant
- Conflicts: Persian Gulf War

Kyle Smith (born 1966) is an American critic, columnist, and novelist. He is currently the film critic and a columnist for The Wall Street Journal and the theater critic for The New Criterion. Earlier, he was critic-at-large for National Review, a film critic and columnist for the New York Post, and a contributor to The Wall Street Journal, People, New York, Forbes, The New York Times, and Commentary.

== Education ==
Smith graduated from East Longmeadow High School in East Longmeadow, Massachusetts in 1984 and from Yale University, summa cum laude, as an English major, and as a Phi Beta Kappa member. Smith served in the U.S. Army during the Persian Gulf War, holding the rank of lieutenant. From 1996 to 2005 he worked at People magazine as editor of book and music reviews.

== Writing ==
A writer in Entertainment Weekly described Smith's film-reviewing style as "an exercise in hilarious hostility". He has been dubbed "America's most cantankerous film critic" by The Atlantic.

=== Love Monkey ===
Love Monkey was published by William Morrow in 2004. Times critic Janet Maslin called the book "hilarious". Time magazine said, "You couldn't ask for a more entertaining drinking buddy – watch out for a memorable strip-club meltdown scene – but there's a deep, dark subway of despair running underneath his riffs, and that's what makes the book more than a standup routine... Love Monkey nails it."

On January 17, 2006, a one-hour CBS dramedy adaptation of the same name debuted. It starred Tom Cavanagh, Judy Greer, Jason Priestley and Larenz Tate. The show aired on CBS in January–February 2006, but was pulled from the CBS prime-time schedule after only three episodes had been aired. Shortly afterwards, VH1 announced that it had acquired the rights to broadcast all 8 episodes which had been filmed to that point. They aired on VH1 in April and May 2006.

=== A Christmas Caroline ===
Smith's second novel, A Christmas Caroline, was published in 2006, also by William Morrow. The Wall Street Journal critic Joseph Bottum wrote, "For those who prefer their sentimentality seasoned with a dash of cynical wit, Kyle Smith's A Christmas Caroline may be a good selection. Mr. Smith ... turns in a quick, enjoyable read about a selfish woman at a fashion magazine who is taught the true meaning of Christmas by three spooky visitors. From the moment you meet Caroline's assistant—a devious redhead named Ursula Heep—you know you're at play in the fields of Charles Dickens.... Mr. Smith takes Dickens' old, familiar tale and stuffs it into a woman straight out of The Devil Wears Prada".
