= Love Monkey =

2006 American TV series

- Genre: Comedy drama
- Based on: Love Monkey by Kyle Smith
- Developed by: Michael Rauch
- Starring: Tom Cavanagh; Judy Greer; Daniel Sunjata; Katherine LaNasa; Christopher Wiehl; Jason Priestley; Larenz Tate
- Opening theme: "Someone Who's Cool" by Odds (episodes 1–3) "For You I Will (Confidence)" by Teddy Geiger (episodes 4–8)
- Composer: John Bissell
- Country of origin: United States
- Original language: English
- No. of seasons: 1
- No. of episodes: 8

Production
- Executive producers: Mark Johnson; Michael Rauch; John Wirth
- Producer: Tom Cavanagh
- Running time: 60 minutes
- Production companies: 34 Films; Gran Via Productions; Paramount Network Television; Sony Pictures Television

Original release
- Network: CBS (episodes 1–3); VH1 (episodes 4–8)
- Release: January 17 – May 16, 2006

Love Monkey is an American comedy-drama television series set in New York City starring Tom Cavanagh. The series was created by Michael Rauch, based on the book of the same name, by Kyle Smith. It was a co-production of Paramount Television and Sony Pictures Television.

The first episode aired on January 17, 2006, on CBS, attracting an audience of about 8.6 million viewers. By its third episode on February 7, viewership was down to 6.2 million, and CBS pulled it from the schedule. CBS later made one episode available online via its short-lived Innertube website.

At the end of March 2006, VH1 announced plans to re-broadcast the three episodes broadcast on CBS and air the five remaining unaired episodes. The last episode aired on May 16, 2006, on VH1. The series was subsequently aired on the Canadian MuchMoreMusic (later M3) channel.

In the summers of 2009 and 2010, the series was shown on the Universal HD cable network.

== Cast ==
- Tom Cavanagh as Tom Ferrell, 30-something single record executive
- Judy Greer as Bran Lowenstein, Tom's friend who always tells things to him straight
- Christopher Wiehl as Jake Dunne, closeted homosexual ex-baseball player turned sportscaster
- Larenz Tate as Derrick "Shooter" Cooper, Tom's wealthy womanizing friend
- Ivana Miličević as Julia, Tom's colleague and possible girlfriend
- Katherine LaNasa as Karen Freed, Tom's sister and Mike's wife
- Jason Priestley as Mike Freed, Tom's friend and brother-in-law

== Music ==
=== Theme song ===
- Episodes 1 – 3: "Someone Who's Cool" by Odds
- Episodes 4 – 8: "For You I Will (Confidence)" by Teddy Geiger

Geiger's theme song "For You I Will (Confidence)" became a hit single, reaching #29 on the Billboard Hot 100 in May 2006. On MuchMoreMusic, the theme was "Someone Who's Cool" by Odds on all episodes.

=== Musical guest appearances ===
The show featured established musicians (often in bit roles) and also features fictional musicians (in italics).

- Episode 1: Teddy Geiger, Aimee Mann
- Episode 2: LeAnn Rimes, Ben Folds, Teddy Geiger, Zoe
- Episode 3: James Blunt, Teddy Geiger
- Episode 4: Aimee Mann, Paul Shaffer, She Wants Revenge, Gladwell
- Episode 5: The Barbarian Bros.
- Episode 6: Ray, Dr. John
- Episode 7: Gordon Decker - Portrayed by Terrence Mann
- Episode 8: Natasha Bedingfield, John Mellencamp, Lisa Loeb, Mýa, Teddy Geiger

== Episodes ==
No.	Title	Original release date	Viewers (millions)
1	"Pilot"	January 17, 2006	8.6
Tom gets fired from his job at a record company after making an unwise comment. He then gets dumped by his girlfriend after being told they are not compatible. Meanwhile, he tries his best to convince a new talented singer, Wayne, found in the small town of Monroe, Michigan, to sign with him. Tom eventually gives up on Wayne because he doesn't have enough money to sign him, but at the end of the episode Tom accepts a new job at True Vinyl, a small indie record company, only to find that this company has signed Wayne (largely because Wayne wants to work with Tom).
2	"Nice Package"	January 24, 2006	7.7
Tom promises to get Zoe, a famous singer he once represented, to play at a benefit concert, but her label will not let her even though she wants to do so. Through Tom's efforts and eventual brainstorm, Zoe is partnered with Wayne and the innovative collaboration results in a great new song on YouTube. Meanwhile, Mike and Karen look for a nanny for their child and Shooter gets involved in a new relationship.
3	"Confidence"	February 7, 2006	5.4
Wayne is ready to release his first single, and Tom insists that Wayne gets a video too. Although his indie record label has little money, Tom wants to make it happen regardless. The rest of the company convince him to hire Nate, an up-and-coming director fresh off an award at the Sundance Film Festival. Nate has more in mind than just making a video and eventually Tom fires him and he makes his own. Meanwhile, Mike's wife decides to petsit a dog, and both Mike and Karen decide they aren't ready for kids. Bran is in a relationship with her boss, who is horrible at sports. Julia has a quick relationship with Nate, and Jake attempts a new catchphrase for his sports commentary.
4	"The One That Got Away"	April 18, 2006 (VH1)	N/A
Tom must rep his ex-girlfriend's band, and he discovers that they still have feelings for each other.
5	"The Window"	April 25, 2006 (VH1)	N/A
Tom has a small window of opportunity to promote the Barbarian Brother's latest album, and a review from Abby Powell could take the band to the next level. However, as the band's rock star lifestyle spins out of control, Abby expresses her feelings for Tom. Tom must find a way to prevent damaging both his career and love life. Meanwhile, Bran's relationship with Scott progresses until a pregnancy scare threatens to derail it.
6	"Mything Persons"	May 2, 2006 (VH1)	N/A
Singer Gordon Decker cracked under the pressure of the music business years ago and never completed his long-awaited second album. Tom now has the chance to buy Gordon's catalogue, but in order for it to be financially beneficial to True Vinyl, he must get Gordon to record the rest of the album. As Tom meets a beautiful doctor with whom he has a real connection, he must also hunt down the reclusive (yet still brilliant) singer and convince him to give the music business another try. Meanwhile, Bran struggles with the fact that she is dating her boss. Note: End song as performed by Gordon Decker was from an original song by Abandoned Pools, "Maybe Then Someday" from the 2005 album Armed To The Teeth.
7	"Opportunity Knocks"	May 9, 2006 (VH1)	N/A
When Tom and the guys attend the funeral of Carmine Moretti, the owner of their favorite pizzeria, Tom discovers that Carmine's son Ray is an amazing singer with star potential. However, Ray must now support his family and take over his father's business. Tom must convince Ray not to squander his talent. He wants to sign Ray with the label. But first, Tom needs to convince Jeff that Ray has more potential for greatness than the artist Julia wants to represent. Meanwhile, when Shooter and Mike are mugged, they are both forced to deal with the situation in their own way.
8	"Coming Out"	May 16, 2006 (VH1)	N/A
On the eve of Wayne's first album release, screaming teenage girls, greedy music executives, and manipulative publicists are all trying to now get a piece of him. Tom is trying to protect Wayne, but Tom's old mammoth label Goliath keeps tempting Wayne and his parents with a lucrative new contract offer. Phil, who works for Goliath, tries to convince Wayne that True Vinyl is too small to take his career to the next level. Phil also offers Tom a new job with his own label under the Goliath umbrella. Meanwhile, Karen and Mike prepare for the birth of their baby, Bran learns whether or not she got the big promotion, Shooter must finally decide if he'll take over the family business, and Jake must choose if wants to face the professional repercussions of coming out.

== Trivia ==
Several episodes of Love Monkey featured the acting and music/recording studio script input of New York City guitarist and recording engineer Hugh Pool and his recording studio Excello Recording.

Tom Cavanagh was set to go on Late Night with Conan O’Brien when it was made known to him just ten minutes before taping that Love Monkey had been canceled.
