= Neopolitan (album) =

Studio album by Odds
- Released: 1991
- Genre: Rock, pop
- Length: 47:02
- Label: Zoo
- Producer: Odds

Odds chronology
Neopolitan (1991)	Bedbugs (1993)

Neopolitan is the 1991 debut album by the Canadian band Odds. It is named for the flavour of ice cream; although intentionally a misspelling (the ice cream flavour is actually spelled neapolitan), "neopolitan" is the spelling that appears on the album cover. Members of the band have stated that the album title was intentionally misspelled in order to see if anyone would pick up on their cunning. "Neo"-new, "politan"- people. New People.

The first two hits were "Love Is the Subject" and "King of the Heap". Third single "Wendy Under the Stars" featured the controversial refrain "I was fucking Wendy under the stars/The night that Elvis died". A true story." An edited version of the song, with the lyric changed to "I made love to Wendy", was released to radio.

== Critical reception ==
Professional ratings
Review scores
Source	Rating
AllMusic	2.5/5 stars

The Vancouver Sun deemed Neopolitan "an album of strategically constructed guitar-pop reminiscent of Badfinger or a giddy-sounding Velvet Underground."

== Track listing ==
All songs written by Craig Northey, Steven Drake, Paul Brennan, and Doug Elliott.

1. "King of the Heap" (4:58)
2. "No Warning" (3:31)
3. "Are You Listening?" (1:44)
4. "Evolution Time" (4:35)
5. "Eternal Ecstasy" (3:53)
6. "Family Tree" (3:56)
7. "Wendy Under the Stars" (4:14)
8. "Truth or Dare" (3:41)
9. "Love Is the Subject" (4:45)
10. "Trees" (2:51)
11. "Domesticated Blind" (3:25)
12. "Big White Wall" (4:15)
13. "Horsehead Nebula" (2:08)
