= Love Monkey (novel) =

2004 novel by Kyle Smith

- Cover to the first USA edition
- Author: Kyle Smith
- Cover artist: Jacket Photograph (c) Royalty Free/Corbis
- Language: English
- Genre: Comic novel
- Publisher: William Morrow, Harper Perennial, HarperCollins e-books
- Publication date: February 2004
- Publication place: United States of America
- Media type: Print (Hardcover & Paperback) & e-book
- Pages: 352 pages (Hardcover edition) & 368 (Paperback edition)
- ISBN: 0-06-057453-4 (1st edition) & ISBN 0-06-057454-2 (Paperback)
- OCLC: 53839887
- Dewey Decimal: 813/.6 22
- LC Class: PS3619.M5895 L68 2004

Love Monkey is a comic novel by Kyle Smith published in 2004. It is the basis for the 2006 CBS television series of the same name. Love Monkey is Kyle Smith's first novel. Smith is currently a film critic for The Wall Street Journal.

== Plot summary ==
Tom Farrell is a man in his thirties who resided in New York City in 2001 (before, during, and after the September 11 attacks). The novel is a slice of life story, briefly visiting several months of his life as he works as an editor of the weekend edition of the New York City newspaper, Tabloid. Although his friends and relatives advance in life (marriage, kids, etc.), Tom believes he is not. He makes around $86,000 a year, but the most expensive item he owns is a several thousand-dollar couches (he doesn't own a high-priced item like a home or car, for example). The novel tracks Tom as he moves through his life, with each chapter being a day in his life during 2001 (not all days are covered, and not all chapters start new days).

Throughout the book, Tom dates several women, including the woman he fancies, Julia. Unfortunately for him, Julia is living with another man and is ten years his junior in age. Julia also works at Tabloid, but while Tom is an editor, Julia is just starting out.

Tom's days are filled with drinking, watching TV (many cartoons), working at "Tabloid", and trying to deal with his deep desire to be in a relationship with Julia, who seems somewhat determined not to have said relationship.

On his ride through 2001, Tom interacts with some of his friends, including Bran, Karen & Mike, Rollo, and Shooter (among others).

== Characters ==
Tom Farrell: Narrator and star of the novel, Tom is a man of relatively average height who describes himself as having the shape of a bowling pin (chubby, fat, overweight), who also happens to have long hair. Tom is the editor for the weekend edition of the NYC newspaper Tabloid. Tom has worked the majority of his professional career at this newspaper. His friends include his default date, Bran, who is something of a female friend, though the relationship is undetermined; Karen & Mike, the married couple (and unlike in the TV series, Karen is not his sister); Shooter, the tall, powerful, rich, ladies man, who is black. Tom is from Maryland, and his Missouri-bred mother still lives in Maryland; she is a dental hygienist.

Brandy 'Bran' Lowenstein: Bran works as a producer for a television news program, is Jewish, and is Tom's “default” date. They tend to like each other, but not in a romantic way.

Karen & Mike: Are Tom's married friends.

Katie/Kate/Katherine: Tom's law-student girlfriend, who is increasingly talking in lawyer speak and whose personality shifts from tarot card reading Katie to extremely serious Katherine as she moves through law school.

Julia: Julia is the young new copygirl at Tabloid, and the woman that Tom cannot seem to move past or get to enter into a serious relationship with him.

Liesl: Another of Tom's girlfriends, Liesl, is of German descent and works for a legal organization that represents high-profile terrorist, murder/serial killer type clients (like the terrorists who bombed the parking garage at the World Trade Center).

Shooter: Shooter comes from a wealthy family, and briefly worked for his father's company. Due to some poor decisions, the father decided that it would be more accessible for all involved if Shooter would be given a sum of money and told to spend his life spending it. Shooter has very strong feelings about women and never has a problem finding a woman to spend time with. One woman, though, really got to him and might have warped his mind.

Rollo: Respected veteran journalist Rollo now reviews movies at Tabloid, with Tom as his editor (and sometimes writer of the reviews).

== Allusions and references ==
=== To other works ===
Several Bob Dylan songs, including "Idiot Wind", "If You See Her Say Hello", "Simple Twist of Fate", and "You're Gonna Make Me Lonesome When You Go", and numerous other musical works are mentioned in this book (including Train's "Drops of Jupiter (Tell Me)", and Pink Floyd's The Wall). Tom writes a review for David McCullough's book John Adams.

=== To actual history, geography and current science ===
The events that occurred during the attacks on September 11, 2001 are mentioned and witnessed by the characters in the book.

== Literary significance & criticism ==
=== Reviews ===
- Champion, Edward (March 2004), "Y-Chromosome Lit?", January Magazine
- Meagher, L. D. (April 7, 2004), "'Love Monkey' funny, revealing", CNN
- Taylor, Amie, "Love Monkey", BookReporter.com
- "Love Monkey", GoodReports.net, April 17, 2004, archived from the original on January 18, 2006

== Release details ==
- 2004, Hardcover, USA, William Morrow, February 2004, ISBN 0-06-057453-4
- 2005, Paperback, USA, Harper Perennial, 1 February 2005, ISBN 0-06-057454-2
