= Mark McKinney =

Canadian actor and comedian (b. 1959)

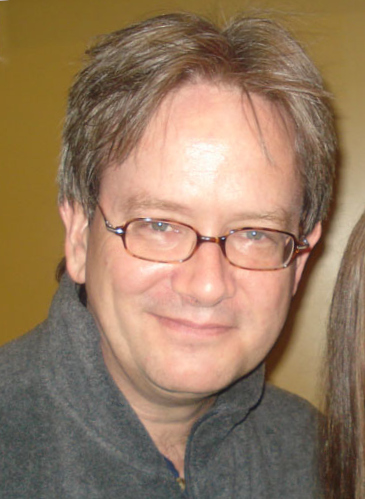
- McKinney in 2008
- Born: Mark Douglas Brown McKinney; June 26, 1959 (age 67); Ottawa, Ontario, Canada
- Occupations: Actor; comedian; writer; producer
- Years active: 1985–present
- Spouse: Marina Gharabegian (m. 1995; div. 2017)
- Children: 2

Mark Douglas Brown McKinney (born June 26, 1959) is a Canadian actor and comedian. He is best known as a member of the sketch comedy troupe The Kids in the Hall, which includes starring in the 1989 to 1995 TV series The Kids in the Hall and 1996 feature film Brain Candy. He was a writer on Saturday Night Live from 1985 to 1986, and returned as a cast member from 1995 to 1997; and from 2003 to 2006, he co-created, wrote and starred in the series Slings & Arrows. He also appeared as Tom in FXX's Man Seeking Woman. From 2015 to 2021, he appeared as store manager Glenn Sturgis on NBC's Superstore.

== Early life ==
McKinney was born on June 26, 1959, in Ottawa, Ontario, to Chloe, an architectural writer, and Russell McKinney, a diplomat.

== Career ==
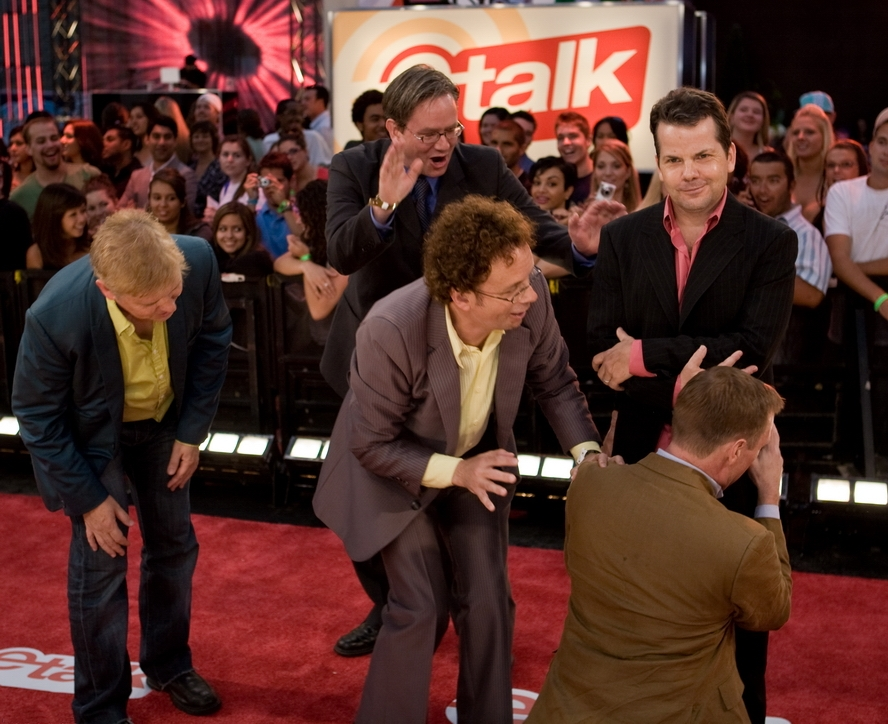
The Kids in the Hall at the 2008 Toronto International Film Festival

He started performing comedy with the Loose Moose Theatre Company in Calgary, Alberta. There, McKinney met Bruce McCulloch. Together they formed a comedy team called "The Audience." Eventually, McKinney and McCulloch moved to Toronto, and met Dave Foley and Kevin McDonald, who were in the process of forming a comedy troupe. Along with Scott Thompson, who joined after coming to a stage show, The Kids in the Hall was formed in 1985.

After the Kids in the Hall caught the attention of Saturday Night Live producer Lorne Michaels, Michaels offered McKinney and McCulloch places on the writing staff. They accepted the offer, joining the SNL writing staff for a single season, the infamous season 11, from 1985-1986, after which SNL was nearly cancelled. Sketches written by McKinney in season 11 include El Spectaculare De Marika (episode 1), Fishermen (episode 5), and One Shoe Emma (episode 14), as well as commercial parodies Drums, Drums, Drums (episode 2), Ad Council (episode 4), and Brim Decaffeinated (episode 16). McKinney also provided a number of uncredited voice-over lines.

The troupe appeared in their own TV series, The Kids in the Hall, which was co-produced by Lorne Michaels and ran from 1988 to 1995. Notable characters on the show played by McKinney include the Chicken Lady, Darill (pronounced da-RILL), bluesman Mississippi Gary, and Mr. Tyzik the Headcrusher, an embittered Eastern European who pretended to crush the heads of passers-by between his thumb and forefinger.

After The Kids in the Hall, McKinney returned to Saturday Night Live, in the cast this time, in the middle of the 1994–1995 season (season 20) as a repertory player. McKinney survived the cast overhaul that occurred at the end of season 20 and his firing was considered at the end of season 21, but he ultimately stayed on SNL until the end of the 1996–1997 (season 22). During his time on SNL, McKinney had six recurring characters (some of note include Ian Daglers from "Scottish Soccer Hooligan Weekly", Melanie, a Catholic schoolgirl, and Lucien Callow, a fop often paired with David Koechner's fop character Fagan) and twenty-seven celebrity impersonations (some of note include Mel Gibson, Barney Frank, Al Gore, Paul Shaffer, Mark Russell, Jim Carrey, Lance Ito, Tim Robbins, Steve Forbes, Wolf Blitzer, Bill Gates, and Ellen DeGeneres).

He has appeared in several films, including the SNL spinoffs Superstar, The Ladies Man and A Night at the Roxbury. McKinney also starred opposite Isabella Rossellini in Guy Maddin's tragicomedy The Saddest Music in the World. He also appeared in the Spice Girls' movie Spice World. In 1999 he appeared in the Canadian theatrical feature film adaptation Jacob Two Two Meets the Hooded Fang.

McKinney cowrote and starred in the Kids in the Hall movie Kids in the Hall: Brain Candy, in which, among other roles, he spoofed SNL and KITH executive producer Lorne Michaels.

=== Theatre ===
His theatre appearances include The Ugly Man with One Yellow Rabbit at the Edinburgh Fringe festival and Glasgow. He was in the cast of The Roundabout theatre production of Flea in her Ear and David Lindsay Abaire's Fuddy Meers for the Manhattan theatre club. During the fall of 2001 McKinney performed the one-man show Fully Committed at the Wintergarden theatre in Toronto and again in the summer of 2002 at the Centaur Theatre in Montreal. In September 2022 he appeared in the European premiere of Eureka Day at The Old Vic theatre in London.

=== Later appearances ===
He also appeared in the first season of Robson Arms, as well as on the Canadian comedy Corner Gas.

From 2003 to 2006, he co-created, co-wrote and starred in the TV series Slings & Arrows, about the backstage goings-on in a Canadian Shakespearean theatre company struggling with financial problems as they rehearse and present various productions.

In 2006–07, he both worked as a story editor on and a recurring role in NBC's Studio 60 on the Sunset Strip as Andy Mackinaw, a humourless widowed writer/story editor for the show-within-a-show. He appeared as a cast member on the CBC comedy Hatching, Matching, and Dispatching and its 2017 follow up A Christmas Fury.

He directed the short film Not Pretty, Really for the 2006 anthology Shorts in Motion: The Art of Seduction.

As well, he directed and appeared on the CBC Radio post-apocalyptic comedy Steve, The First and its sequel, Steve, The Second, for his friend Matt Watts. He also wrote one episode of Watts' sitcom Michael, Tuesdays and Thursdays, which aired on CBC Television in fall 2011.

In the summer of 2007, he became the show-runner and executive producer of Less Than Kind, a half hour comedy starring Maury Chaykin.

McKinney was in an episode of the Canadian children's TV show Dino Dan called "Prehistoric Zoo/Ready? Set? Dino!" He plays Dino Dan's track coach in the second part, "Ready? Set? Dino!", of this two-part episode released 4 October 2010 (Canada).

He co-wrote and starred in the Kids in the Hall 2010 reunion project Death Comes to Town.

In 2011, he was an executive producer of Picnicface, a sketch TV series from the Halifax comedy troupe of the same name produced for The Comedy Network.

In 2013, he co-starred in Rocket Monkeys as the main antagonist, Lord Peel. In 2014, he appeared in the CBC television series The Best Laid Plans. Beginning in 2015, he was a co-star on the NBC sitcom Superstore which was cancelled in 2021.

In 2020, he appeared as a guest on the Studio 60 on the Sunset Strip marathon fundraiser episode of The George Lucas Talk Show

In 2022, he joined the other Kids in the Hall for an eight-episode sixth season on Amazon Prime.

In 2024, he hosted the documentary series Mark McKinney Needs a Hobby for CTV.

In 2025, he appeared in several episodes of the sketch comedy series This Hour Has 22 Minutes, as prime minister Mark Carney. According to McKinney, the idea was launched after a post he made to X was mistakenly attributed to Carney, with 22 Minutes writers Mike Allison and Mark Critch contacting him to offer him the role soon afterward.

== Filmography ==
=== Film ===
| Year | Title | Role | Notes |
|---|---|---|---|
| 1994 | The Passion of John Ruskin | John Ruskin | Short film |
| 1996 | Kids in the Hall: Brain Candy | Don Roritor / Simon / Cabbie / Gunther / Cop #1 / Nina Bedford / Melanie / Drill sergeant / Sharisse (White-trash woman) | Also writer |
| 1997 | The Wrong Guy | Cameo | Uncredited |
| 1997 | Hayseed | Alien Doctor | |
| 1997 | Spice World | Graydon | |
| 1998 | Fidelio | Mark | Short film |
| 1998 | The Last Days of Disco | Rex | |
| 1998 | The Herd | Unknown | |
| 1998 | Dog Park | Dr. Cavan, Dog Psychologist | |
| 1998 | A Night at the Roxbury | Father Williams | |
| 1999 | The Out-of-Towners | Greg | |
| 1999 | New Waterford Girl | Doctor Hogan | |
| 1999 | Jacob Two Two Meets the Hooded Fang | Mr. Fish | |
| 1999 | Superstar | Father Ritley | |
| 2000 | The Ladies Man | Mr. White | |
| 2000 | This Might Be Good | Unknown | Short film |
| 2002 | Toothpaste | Husband | Short film |
| 2003 | The Saddest Music in the World | Chester Kent | Also additional camera operator |
| 2003 | Falling Angels | Reg and Ron | |
| 2006 | Snow Cake | Neighbour | Uncredited |
| 2006 | Not Pretty, Really | Interviewer | Short film; also director |
| 2006 | Unaccompanied Minors | Guard in the Hall #3 | |
| 2008 | Carfuckers | Payette | Short film; also writer |
| 2009 | High Life | Jeremy | |
| 2017 | Room for Rent | Warren Baldwin | |
| 2018 | Seven Stages to Achieve Eternal Bliss | Cultist | |
| 2018 | Doozy | Clovis (voice) | |
| 2024 | Scared Shitless | Dr. Robert | |
| 2024 | This Too Shall Pass | Bishop Hamolta | |

=== Television ===
| Year | Title | Role | Notes |
|---|---|---|---|
| 1985–1990 | Saturday Night Live | Various voices | 21 episodes; uncredited |
| 1987 | Seeing Things | Unknown | Episode: "Another Point of View" |
| 1987–1990 | Street Legal | Stanley / Officer Robert Kaufman | 2 episodes |
| 1988 | Dynaman | Dynablue (voice) | Unknown episodes |
| 1988–1995; 2022 | The Kids in the Hall | Various | 109 episodes; also writer and director |
| 1995–1997 | Saturday Night Live | Various | 48 episodes |
| 2000 | Twitch City | Rex Reilly | 3 episodes |
| 2000 | Strangers with Candy | Lee | Episode: "The Last Temptation of Blank" |
| 2000 | The Industry | Dean Sutherland | Episode: "Wrongly Convicted" |
| 2001 | Clerks | Freak #2 (voice) | Episode: "The Last Episode Ever" |
| 2001 | 3rd Rock from the Sun | Guy | Episode: "My Mother, My Dick" |
| 2001 | Mentors | Mack Sennett | Episode: "Silent Movie" |
| 2001 | Dice | Sam Cutter | 6 episodes |
| 2001 | Criminal Mastermind | Unknown | TV movie |
| 2003 | Wanda at Large | Mark | 2 episodes |
| 2003 | Lilo & Stitch: The Series | Bertley Pleakley (voice) | Episode: "Fibber: Experiment 032" |
| 2003 | The Toronto Show | Various | Episode #1.1 |
| 2003–2006 | Slings & Arrows | Richard Smith-Jones | 18 episodes; also creator and writer |
| 2004 | Puppets Who Kill | Quiz Show Host | Episode: "Rocko Gets a Lung" |
| 2005 | Corner Gas | Bill | Episode: "An American in Saskatchewan" |
| 2005 | Kevin Hill | Professor Xavier Ambrose | Episode: "Losing Isn't Everything" |
| 2005 | Robson Arms | Tom Goldblum | 3 episodes |
| 2005 | Burnt Toast | Trevor | TV movie |
| 2005 | Rick Mercer Report | Driver in Responsible Drinking Commercial | Episode #3.3 |
| 2005–2006 | Hatching, Matching and Dispatching | Todd | 6 episodes; also writer |
| 2006 | Heyday! | Bob Hope | TV movie |
| 2006–2007 | Studio 60 on the Sunset Strip | Andy Mackinaw | 10 episodes; also writer |
| 2008-2012 | Less Than Kind | (Writer) | 8 episodes |
| 2010 | The Kids in the Hall: Death Comes to Town | Various | 8 episodes; also writer |
| 2010 | Less Than Kind | Gunman / The Bear | 2 episodes; also writer, executive producer, and director |
| 2010 | Dino Dan | Mr. Drumheller | 2 episodes |
| 2013–2016 | Rocket Monkeys | Lord Peel (voice) | |
| 2013 | Mother Up! | Leland | Episode: "Shoe I Am" |
| 2013–2014 | This Hour Has 22 Minutes | Various | 2 episodes; also writer |
| 2014 | The Best Laid Plans | George Quimby | 6 episodes |
| 2014 | Spun Out | Alastair | Episode: "Middle Aged Men in the Hall" |
| 2014 | Space Riders: Division Earth | Chair | 3 episodes |
| 2014 | Odd Squad | General Pentagon | Episode: "Crime at Shapely Manor" |
| 2015–2017 | Man Seeking Woman | Tom | 18 episodes |
| 2015–2021 | Superstore | Glenn Sturgis | Main cast, 113 episodes; also Director of “Love Birds” |
| 2019 | Where's Waldo | (Voice) | Episode: "A Wanderer Christmas" |
| 2020 | The George Lucas Talk Show | Himself | Episode: "Stu-D2 1138 on the Binary Sunset Sith" |
| 2021–2023 | The Great North | Morris / Jobiathan (voice) | 2 episodes |
| 2021 | Corner Gas Animated | Frank Shoddy (voice) | Episode: "Parachute the Messenger" |
| 2023 | Son of a Critch | Hudaro | Episode: "Who Dares Dare Hudaro?" |
| 2023 | Jane | Mr. Harrison | Episode "Apis mellifera" |
| 2023 | American Dad! | (Voice) | Voice; Episode: "A Little Extra Scratch" |
| 2024 | Mark McKinney Needs a Hobby | Self | Documentary series host |
| 2024 | Last Week Tonight with John Oliver | Peach (Voice) | |
| 2025 | This Hour Has 22 Minutes | Mark Carney | 5 episodes |
| 2025 | The Z-Suite | George | 4 episodes |
| 2025 | Wayward | Maurice | Episode "Build" |
