= Someone Who's Cool =

1996 single by Odds

Single by Odds

from the album Nest
- B-side: "Eat My Brain"; "Wendy Under the Stars" (original); "Suppertime" (original)
- Released: 1996
- Length: 3:17
- Label: WEA
- Songwriters: Doug Elliott; Pat Steward; Steven Drake
- Producer: Nigel the Cat

Odds singles chronology
"Mercy to Go" (1996)	"Someone Who's Cool" (1996)	"Make You Mad" (1997)

Music video
- "Someone Who's Cool" on YouTube

"Someone Who's Cool" is a song by Canadian rock band Odds. It was released in 1996 as the lead single from the band's fourth album, Nest (1996). The song was originally written for the Friends soundtrack. The song peaked at number two on the Canadian RPM 100 Hit Tracks chart and number three on the RPM Alternative 30. The song also received airplay in the United States, peaking at number 20 on the Billboard Bubbling Under Hot 100 and number six on the Billboard Triple-A chart. The song was used as the theme song to the short-lived CBS music industry comedy Love Monkey.

== Music video ==
The song's music video was directed by Curtis Wehrfritz. It was nominated for "Best Video" at the 1997 Juno Awards.

== Track listing ==
UK and Australian CD single

1. "Someone Who's Cool" – 3:16
2. "Eat My Brain" – 4:25
3. "Wendy Under the Stars" (original version) – 4:01
4. "Suppertime" (original version) – 3:47

== Charts ==
=== Weekly charts ===
Chart (1997)	Peak position
Canada Top Singles (RPM)	2
Canada Rock/Alternative (RPM)	3
US Bubbling Under Hot 100 Singles (Billboard)	20
US Triple-A (Billboard)	6
US Active Rock (Radio & Records)	29

=== Year-end charts ===
Chart (1997)	Position
Canada Top Singles (RPM)	49
Canada Rock/Alternative (RPM)	44
US Triple-A (Billboard)	34

== Release history ==
Region	Date	Format(s)	Label(s)	Ref.
Canada	1996	Radio	WEA	
United States	February 25, 1997	Contemporary hit radio	Elektra	
