= Giddy Up (album) =

Studio album by Craig Northey
- Released: 2001
- Genre: Alternative rock
- Length: 25:00

Giddy Up is the first solo CD released by Craig Northey, a former member of the Canadian 1990's alternative band Odds. It was released in 2001 and has eight songs, totaling a running time of approximately 25 minutes. Other composers who contributed to the album include David Gamson and Blair Packham.

1. "Take a Hit Off This"
2. "Slow Motion"
3. "Giddy Up"
4. "After Walking in Space"
5. "Famous Grave"
6. "Old Mistakes"
7. "Write It in Lightning"
8. "Sons & Daughters"

"Write It in Lightning" was written for The Who, who bought the rights to record the song; however, the song remains unreleased by The Who.
