= Kevin McDonald =

Canadian actor, comedian and writer (born 1961)

- McDonald in 2026
- Born: Kevin Hamilton McDonald; May 16, 1961 (age 65); Montreal, Quebec, Canada
- Occupations: Actor; comedian; writer
- Years active: 1987–present
- Spouse: Tiffany Lacey (m. 1993; div. 1995)

Kevin Hamilton McDonald (born May 16, 1961) is a Canadian actor, comedian and writer. He is a member of the comedy troupe The Kids in the Hall, who have appeared together in a number of stage, television and film productions, most notably the 1988–1995 TV series The Kids in the Hall. He played Pastor Dave in That '70s Show, and starred as a co-pilot in the 2011 web comedy series Papillon. He also does voice work in animation, most notably as Agent Wendy Pleakley in the Lilo & Stitch franchise, Waffle in Catscratch, and the Almighty Tallest Purple in Invader Zim.

He starred alongside Rodney Dangerfield, Lou Ferrigno and Dom DeLuise as the titular character in the gangster parody film The Godson.

== Early life ==
McDonald was born in Montréal, Québec, the son of Sheila and Hamilton "Hammy" McDonald, who was a dental equipment salesman. He moved to Los Angeles, California, at the age of seven, after his father was transferred there. His family subsequently lived in Toronto, Ontario, as well. McDonald has a younger sister, Sandra.

During an interview on WTF with Marc Maron, McDonald discussed his father's severe alcoholism, which inspired the Kids in the Hall sketches "Daddy Drank" and "Girl Drink Drunk." Although he calls his mother "a wonderful woman," she was nevertheless reluctant to leave his father until Kevin turned 19, when his father's drinking had escalated to two bottles of vodka daily. McDonald, his mother and sister rented an apartment, where they quietly moved their belongings "every night [after his father would] collapse on the stairs." Once they had completely moved, his parents divorced, his father lost his job, went bankrupt and lived in a homeless shelter for a year, during which he abstained from drinking (although he alleged "his roommates were drinking Drano"); coincidentally, McDonald used the same building to rehearse with The Kids in the Hall as they were starting out on stage. His father was able to find employment at a flower shop, then an apartment and, over time, resume his career in dental equipment sales. Eventually, he did drink again, but not to the extent he had earlier in his life. He died of an aneurysm in 2004. McDonald used his relationship with his father as the basis for a one-man show, Hammy and the Kids, in which he said he had no happy ending to the story of his father. However, during an interview with Marc Maron, he said after one performance of his one-man show, he was approached by a stranger who said that he had served his father as a bartender, and that his father mentioned how proud he was of his son, the famous comedian, which moved McDonald to tears "like the ending to a bad movie."

McDonald briefly studied acting at a community college, where he was kicked out for being "a one-legged actor" (i.e. he could perform comedy, but not drama) by a dean who had an amputated leg, and was therefore a literal one-legged actor. However, one of his professors, William B. Davis (who later found fame in his portrayal of Cigarette Smoking Man on The X-Files), saw McDonald's potential and encouraged him to pursue improv comedy by giving him the number to The Second City in Toronto.

== Career ==
McDonald founded The Kids in the Hall comedy troupe with his friend Dave Foley. They met in Toronto at the Second City Training Center, and the two wrote and performed in sketches together more than any other pair in the group. In the troupe's TV and stage shows, he portrays several popular recurring characters, such as the King of Empty Promises, Sir Simon Milligan, and Jerry Sizzler. A frequent running gag was that McDonald is the least popular member and always struggling not to get kicked out.

When the troupe ended the five-season run of its eponymous television series in 1994, the five members moved to a number of solo projects. McDonald has played roles in movies like Boy Meets Girl, Pleakley in the Lilo & Stitch franchise, and Harry Potter in Epic Movie. On television, he has appeared on The Martin Short Show, Ellen (as a radio personality), That '70s Show (as a confused young cleric, Pastor Dave), Seinfeld, Friends, NewsRadio (on which Foley starred), MADtv, Arrested Development, and Corner Gas. McDonald has also done voice work for various animated series, including Johnny Bravo, Invader Zim (in which he did the voice for Almighty Tallest Purple), The Angry Beavers, Catscratch (in which he voiced Waffle), and Clerks: The Animated Series. He also played an imaginary friend named Ivan in the Foster's Home for Imaginary Friends episode Sight For Sore Eyes, and appeared in the music video for "Roses" by OutKast.

Since 2000, McDonald and the other members of The Kids in the Hall have reunited for a number of tours and televised performances. The troupe played the 2007 Just for Laughs festival, where McDonald also performed his one-and-a half-man show Hammy and the Kids with Craig Northey, based on his two dysfunctional families, his father ("Hammy") and The Kids in the Hall.

In 2006, McDonald hosted a CBC Television special, Sketch with Kevin McDonald, featuring several of Canada's best-known sketch comedy troupes. The special received two nominations, for the performances by The Minnesota Wrecking Crew and by The Imponderables, for Canadian Comedy Award in the category Best Taped Live Performance, with The Minnesota Wrecking Crew winning the award.

== Personal life ==
As of 2025, McDonald resides in Winnipeg. He was married to Tiffany Lacey from 1993 to 1995. He has no children.

== Filmography ==
=== Film ===
Year	Title	Role	Notes
1987	Distant Horizons	Lonely Met Tech	Video
1995	National Lampoon's Senior Trip	Travis Lindsey	
1996	Kids in the Hall: Brain Candy	Dr. Chris Cooper / Doreen / Chris' dad / Lacey	
1997	The Wrong Guy	Motel Manager	
1998	Boy Meets Girl	Jack	
1998	The Godson	Guppy Calzone	
1999	Galaxy Quest	Announcer	
2000	The Ladies Man	Mail Man	
2002	Lilo & Stitch	Agent Wendy Pleakley	Voice
2003	Stitch! The Movie	Agent Wendy Pleakley	Voice, direct-to-video
2005	Sky High	Dr. Medulla	
2005	Thru the Moebius Strip	Agent Po	Voice, English dub
2005	Lilo & Stitch 2: Stitch Has a Glitch	Agent Wendy Pleakley	Voice, direct-to-video
2006	Leroy & Stitch	Agent Wendy Pleakley	Voice, television film
2006	Unaccompanied Minors	Guard in the Hall #1	
2007	Epic Movie	Harry Potter	
2009	Year of the Carnivore	Mr. Smalls	
2011	Keyhole	Ogilbe	
2012	Dead Before Dawn	Prof. Duffy	
2018	Sorry for Your Loss	Vince Kendall	
2019	Boys vs. Girls	Coffee	
2021	Mouth Congress	Uncle Kevin	
2024	Deaner '89	Principal Gil	
2026	Teenage Sex and Death at Camp Miasma	Anthony / County Sheriff	

=== Television ===
Year	Title	Role	Notes
1988–1995; 2022	The Kids in the Hall	Various	109 episodes
1996	MADtv	Himself	Host, Episode #2.6
1997	Friends	Guru Saj	Episode: "The One with Ross's Thing"
1997	NewsRadio	Throwdini	Episode: "Stupid Holiday Charity Talent Show"
1997	Seinfeld	Denim Vest	Episode: "The Strike"
1997–1998	Ellen	Chuck	2 episodes
1997–2004	Johnny Bravo	Mime, Young Clown, Timmy, Himself	Voice, 3 episodes
1998	Cow and Chicken	Canadian Dad / Jorge	Voice, episode: "Meet Lance Sackless/Who's Afraid of the Dark?"
1998	The Angry Beavers	Zookeeper	Voice, episode: "Zooing Time"
1998	The Drew Carey Show	Heller	Episode: "Drew and the Conspiracy"
2000–2001	That '70s Show	Pastor Dave	6 episodes
2001	Clerks: The Animated Series	Batman Fan - Freak #1	Voice, episode: "The Last Episode Ever"
2001	The Santa Claus Brothers	Mel Claus	Voice, television film
2001–2003	Invader Zim	Almighty Tallest Purple, Tae, Lobotomy Cop, Malfunctioning SIR Units	Voice, 10 episodes
2002	Whatever Happened to... Robot Jones?	Mr. Mitchell	Voice, episode: "Sickness"
2002	The True Meaning of Christmas Specials	The Ghost of Christmas Specials Yet to Come	Television film
2003	Sick in the Head		Television film
2003	A Minute with Stan Hooper	Officer Dector	Episode: "Fear Finds the Falls"
2003	Las Vegas	Monty McClure	Episode: "Decks and Violence"
2003–2004	What's New, Scooby-Doo?	Officer Claphammer, Julian Libris	Voice, 2 episodes
2003–2006	Lilo & Stitch: The Series	Agent Wendy Pleakley	Voice, 29 episodes
2004	Corner Gas	Marvin Drey	Episode: "Tax Man"
2004	Yes, Dear	Bob	Episode: "Dead Aunt, Dead Aunt..."
2004	Grounded for Life	Steve	Episode: "Pressure Drop"
2004	Arrested Development	Det. Streudler	Episode: "Not Without My Daughter"
2004	Zeroman	Rusty Woodenwater	Voice, episode: "Smotherly Love"
2005	Foster's Home for Imaginary Friends	Ivan	Voice, episode: "Sight for Sore Eyes"
2005–2007	Catscratch	Waffle, Gomez, Waffle Robots, Newts	Voice, 20 episodes
2006	Minoriteam	Alien Leader	Voice, 2 episodes
2006	Bratz	Scott	Voice, episode: "Inner Beauty Queen"
2006	Casper's Scare School	Beaky (The Pirate's Parrot)	Voice, television film
2006	Sketch with Kevin McDonald	Host	Television film
2007	According to Jim	Therapist	Episode: "All the Rage"
2007	Carpoolers	Donny Daramajian	Episode: "The Seminar"
2007	The Emperor's New School	Security Guard	Voice, 1 episode
2008–2010	WordGirl	Vocab Bee, Police Chief, Judge, The Baker	Voice, 4 episodes
2008–2012	Less Than Kind	Walter	4 episodes
2009	Back at the Barnyard	Baxter, Flaky, Alien 1	Voice, 3 episodes
2009, 2011	The Penguins of Madagascar	Barry	Voice, 2 episodes
2010	The Kids in the Hall: Death Comes to Town	Various	8 episodes
2010	The Soup	Grownup Pageant Princess	1 episode
2010	Dino Dan	Mr. Curry	Episode: "Dino Trap/Big Bad Spinosaurus"; uncredited
2011	Dan Vs.	Barry Ditmer	Voice, episode: "Technology"
2011	Papillon	Darius	15 episodes
2011–2012	Fish Hooks	Dr. Frog, Chicken	Voice, 9 episodes
2012, 2016	Kung Fu Panda: Legends of Awesomeness	Lu Kang	Voice, 2 episodes
2013	Phineas and Ferb	Professor Bannister	Voice, episode: "Sidetracked"
2013	Brooklyn Nine-Nine	Disco Strangler	Episode: "Pilot"; uncredited
2014	Spun Out	Damian	Episode: "Middle Aged Men in the Hall"
2014	Comedy Bang! Bang!	Galactic Commander of the Planet Pylon	Episode: "Craig Robinson Wears a Bordeaux Button Down & Dark Jeans"
2014	Odd Squad	Lord Rectangle	Episode: "Crime at Shapely Manor"
2015	Tiny Plastic Men	Billy Bland / Billy Blumpie	Episode: "Billy Blumpie"
2015	Wander Over Yonder	Sherblorg King	Voice, 2 episodes
2015	Moonbeam City	Accoutrement	Voice, episode: "Lasers and Liars"
2015	The Plateaus	Jimp	10 episodes; web series
2016	Man Seeking Woman	Chainsaw	Episode: "Cactus"
2016	Delmer & Marta	Creston	8 episodes
2016–2017	The Bagel and Becky Show	Bagel	Voice, 26 episodes
2017	Billy Dilley's Super-Duper Subterranean Summer	TV Announcer	Voice, episode: "The Mushroom Prince/Count Wretcher"
2017–2018	Walk the Prank	Mr. Dingley	7 episodes
2019	Amphibia	Albus Duckweed	Voice, Recurring role
2019	Invader Zim: Enter the Florpus	Almighty Tallest Purple	Voice, television film
2019	Carter	Russell Langham	Episode: "Harley Insisted On Wearing Pants"
2021	Tig n' Seek	Gov	Episode: Boss-off!
2023	Scott Pilgrim Takes Off	The Director	Voice, 3 episodes
2025	Super Team Canada	Prime Minister of Canada	Voice
2026	SpongeBob SquarePants	Guy Fishman	Voice, episode: "Kiss of the Nematode/Brainless Brawn"

=== Video games ===
Year	Title	Role	Notes
2002	Lilo & Stitch: Trouble in Paradise	Agent Wendy Pleakley	Voice
2002	Lilo & Stitch: Hawaiian Adventure	Agent Wendy Pleakley	Voice
2007	Catscratch	Waffle	Voice
2014	Disney Infinity 2.0	Agent Wendy Pleakley	Voice, Stitch's Tropical Rescue Toy Box Game
2022	High on Life	Dr.Giblets	Voice

=== Internet web series ===
Year	Title	Role	Notes
2018	Deep Space 69	P3-NI5	Voice (Season 4)

=== Theme parks ===
Year	Title	Role	Notes
2004	Stitch's Great Escape!	Agent Wendy Pleakley	Voice, Short; theme park attraction

== Awards and nominations ==
- 1989 - Gemini Award for Best Writing in a Comedy or Variety Program or Series - Won
- 1989 - Gemini Award for Best Performance in a Variety or Performing Arts Program or Series - Won
- 1990 - Gemini Award for Best Writing in a Comedy or Variety Program or Series - Won
- 1992 - Gemini Award for Best Performance in a Comedy Program or Series - Nominated
- 1993 - Gemini Award for Best Performance in a Comedy Program or Series - Won
- 1993 - Emmy Award for Outstanding Individual Achievement in Writing in a Variety or Music Program - Nominated
- 1993 - CableACE Award - Nominated
- 1994 - Gemini Award for Best Performance in a Comedy Program or Series - Nominated
- 1994 - Emmy Award for Outstanding Individual Achievement in Writing in a Variety or Music Program - Nominated
- 1995 - Emmy Award for Outstanding Individual Achievement in Writing in a Variety or Music Program - Nominated
- 1995 - Gemini Award for Best Writing in a Comedy or Variety Program or Series - Nominated
- 1996 - Gemini Award for Best Writing in a Comedy or Variety Program or Series - Nominated
- 1996 - Gemini Award for Best Performance in a Comedy Program or Series - Nominated
- 1998 - Silver Hugo Award for Best Documentary - Won
- 2003 - Gemini Award for Best Performance or Host in a Variety Program or Series - Nominated
