= Drunk Baby Project =

Studio album by Bruce McCulloch
- Released: October 1, 2002
- Genre: Comedy
- Length: 37:12
- Label: Tront Communications

Bruce McCulloch chronology
Shame-Based Man (1995)	Drunk Baby Project (2002)

Professional ratings
Review scores
Source	Rating
Allmusic	3/5 stars

Drunk Baby Project, released on October 1, 2002, is the second album by the comedian Bruce McCulloch. It has 14 tracks of McCulloch's comedic music.

== Track listing ==
1. "Drunk Baby Project" (Brian Connelly, Bruce McCulloch) – 3:09
2. "Bob Seger" (Connelly, McCulloch, Craig Northey) – 2:58
3. "Caller Go Ahead" (McCulloch) – 0:54
4. "Cheer for the Team" (Connelly, McCulloch, Northey) – 2:28
5. "For the Ladies" (Connelly, McCulloch, Northey) – 3:10
6. "The Bible" (Connelly, McCulloch) – 1:04
7. "Sucra Poppa" (Connelly, McCulloch, Tracy Ryan) – 2:45
8. "Clinique Ladies" (Connelly, McCulloch) – 4:27
9. "Flying Dream" (Connelly, McCulloch) – 2:15
10. "Warehouse Prayer" (Connelly, McCulloch, Northey) – 2:32
11. "Hangover Chronicles" (Connelly, McCulloch, Northey) – 3:29
12. "Never Trust" (Connelly, McCulloch) – 2:40
13. "One Good Cup" (McCulloch) – 1:36
14. "Lil' Gay Waiter" (Connelly, McCulloch, Northey) – 3:49
15. "Aliens" (McCulloch) – 2:38

== Personnel ==
- Bruce McCulloch – vocals
- Brian Connelly – guitar
- Craig Northey – guitar
- Tracy Ryan – additional vocals
