= Dog Park (film) =

1998 film by Bruce McCulloch

- Theatrical release poster
- Directed by: Bruce McCulloch
- Written by: Bruce McCulloch
- Produced by: Susan Cavan
- Starring: Natasha Henstridge; Luke Wilson; Janeane Garofalo; Kathleen Robertson; Bruce McCulloch; Amie Carey; Harland Williams; Kristin Lehman; Gordon Currie; Mark McKinney
- Cinematography: David A. Makin
- Edited by: Norman Buckley; Christopher Cooper
- Music by: Craig Northey; Christophe Beck
- Production companies: Independent Pictures; Accent Entertainment
- Distributed by: New Line Cinema (USA) Lions Gate Films (Canada)
- Release dates: September 14, 1998 (Canada); September 24, 1999 (United States)
- Running time: 91 minutes
- Countries: United States; Canada
- Language: English
- Box office: $250,147

Dog Park is a 1998 romantic comedy film written and directed by Bruce McCulloch. It is an American and Canadian co-production.

== Plot ==
Andy writes the local newspaper classified advertisements and has been going from relationship to relationship since eighth grade. He loses custody of his dog when his girlfriend, Cheryl, breaks up with him for another man, a punk rocker named Trevor.

Andy then meets Lorna, a children's TV show host, but she is too obsessed with her own dog. She is also still emotionally fragile because Trevor left her for Cheryl. Andy meets her in a bar and takes her home as she seems interested. They begin making out, but it stops there as she throws up.

Knowing Lorna works for the TV station, Andy sends her roses and a note requesting a relationship and even calls, but she decides not to pursue. He moves on by putting himself in a dating auction. Lorna spends some time alone and finally goes out on a date with the clerk from the video store, Callum. The date is lackluster, but he helps her out in a big way with the message he leaves on her machine.

Andy gets involved with the woman who won him in the auction, Kieran, a vegan nutritionist, who believes a lot of sex is beneficial. Meanwhile, Cheryl and Andy take their dog to a psychiatrist, who tells them that her having rough sex near the dog is traumatizing it.

While both Andy and Cheryl do their best to share custody, problems arise as Cheryl and Trevor break up and she unsuccessfully tries to win Andy back. On a double date, Keiran figures out Jeri's boyfriend Jeff is having an affair observing his body language on the phone.

When Rachel goes to the obedience school graduation to see Jeff's dogs get their diplomas, one of the dogs runs to Rachel and Jeri deduces the affair. They break up. Andy goes to her side to console her.

Both Andy and Lorna have feelings for each other, but are unsure how to follow through with it. Andy dating Kieran and Lorna having a date with Callum help them come to a very important conclusion. They meet up at the bar where they first met 100 days later and start a relationship.

== Cast ==
- Janeane Garofalo as Jeri
- Natasha Henstridge as Lorna
- Bruce McCulloch as Jeff
- Mark McKinney as Dog Psychologist
- Kathleen Robertson as Cheryl
- Harland Williams as Callum
- Luke Wilson as Andy
- Kristin Lehman as Keiran
- Amie Carey as Rachel
- Gordon Currie as Trevor
- Peter MacNeill as Neighbor
- Jerry Schaefer as Norm
- Zachary Bennett as Dougie
- Ron James as Male Dog Owner #1
- Albert Schultz as Male Dog Owner #2
- Terri Hawkes as Announcer
- Michael Bean as Driver

== Reception ==
On Rotten Tomatoes the film has an approval rating of 36% based on 25 reviews. On Metacritic it has a score of 46% score, based on 14 reviews. Mick LaSalle from San Francisco Chronicle wrote: "Dog Park is clever and pleasant and holds interest. Janeane Garofalo is restrained as a cynical and sensitive magazine editor, and Bruce McCulloch, who wrote the script and directed the picture, plays her boyfriend. McCulloch has mostly written himself out of the movie. He gives himself a couple of strong moments but otherwise keeps his focus where it belongs, on Wilson." Ken Fox from TV Guide gave the movie three out of five stars. Lisa Schwarzbaum from Entertainment Weekly gave it a B− grade and wrote: "No disrespect is meant by saying that this shambling romantic comedy, written and directed by "Kids in the Hall" alum Bruce McCulloch, clings to a sensibility that’s imperviously, uncompromisingly Canadian. The pace, the punchlines, and the characters of Dog Park all land just a little north of target, even though the notion that canine playgrounds make good pickup grounds for humans would appear to be an imperviously, uncompromisingly L.A. idea." Leonard Maltin called the film "Howling bad... with unlikeable leads and meandering sub-plots". Like most viewers, he did enjoy Mark McKinney as the dog therapist.

=== Awards ===
- Genie Awards
  - Best Performance by an Actor in a Supporting Role - Mark McKinney
  - Nominated for Best Original Screenplay — Bruce McCulloch
- Canadian Comedy Awards
  - Nominated for Film Directing — Bruce McCulloch
  - Nominated for Film Writing — Bruce McCulloch
  - Nominated for Film Performance Male — Mark McKinney
