= The Kids in the Hall: Death Comes to Town =

Canadian television series

- Title card
- Genre: Dark comedy
- Created by: The Kids in the Hall
- Directed by: Kelly Makin
- Starring: Dave Foley; Bruce McCulloch; Kevin McDonald; Mark McKinney; Scott Thompson
- Country of origin: Canada
- Original language: English
- No. of seasons: 1
- No. of episodes: 8

Production
- Running time: 30 minutes

Original release
- Network: CBC Television
- Release: January 12 – March 16, 2010

Related
- The Kids in the Hall

The Kids in the Hall: Death Comes to Town (or simply Death Comes to Town) is an eight-episode Canadian dark comedy miniseries that aired on CBC Television on Tuesdays between January 12 and March 16, 2010. The show takes place in a fictional Ontario town called Shuckton whose mayor has been murdered. As the Shuckton residents cope with the loss, a new lawyer moves in to prosecute a suspect, though another resident, unsatisfied with the evidence, tries to find the real killer. At the same time, a character who is a personification of death waits at a motel room for the latest Shuckton residents to die.

The series was proposed by Bruce McCulloch during a 2008 comedy tour and developed by the ensemble into a dark-comedy murder mystery, a departure from their typical sketch comedy format. Inspiration for the series came in part from the British comedy series The League of Gentlemen. While the members of The Kids in the Hall play all of the major adult characters, a number of other comedic actors appear in supporting roles, including Dan Redican, Colin Mochrie, Wayne Robson, Leah N.H. Philpott, Susan Kent and Mike Beaver. The series was filmed in North Bay, Mattawa, and Sturgeon Falls, Ontario in the summer of 2009.

== Premise ==
The mayor of Shuckton, Ontario (population 27,063) is murdered several hours after announcing that the town's bid for the 2028 Summer Olympics was rejected. A small-time criminal, Crim, is found with blood on him and is put on trial for the murder. However, an obese man named Ricky suspects the real murderer is still at large and, with the help of his friend Marnie, he investigates the crime. Meanwhile, the mayor's widow takes over mayoral duties, women on a local news team compete for attention, the coroner steals the mayor's body, Crim's lawyer does everything he can to keep his cat alive, and Death waits in a motel room to collect the souls of dead Shuckton citizens.

== Characters ==
All major characters in the miniseries were played by the five members of The Kids in the Hall, except for the mayor's son, who was played by young actor Landon Reynolds-Trudel. Several of the original The Kids in the Hall characters appear in cameo roles, including Mark McKinney's Chicken Lady as a candidate juror and Paul Bellini (Note: Appears in one episode, "Serious Shocking News," but credited as a script consultant in all eight episodes.) clad only in his towel at an ATM; in addition, McCulloch and McKinney's police officers are tweaked variations of their OPP officer characters of the original series.

Other actors who appeared in supporting roles include Dan Redican, (Note: Credited in 1 episode, "The Stages of Grief," as playing Attorney.) Colin Mochrie, (Note: Credited in 1 episode, "Big City Smack Down," as playing Veterinarian.) Wayne Robson, (Note: Credited in 2 episodes: "Big City Smack Down" and "The Stages of Grief" as playing Bartender.) Leah N.H. Philpott, (Note: Credited in 4 episodes, "Big City Smack Down," "The Butterfly Is To Blame," "Cause of Death," and "Serious Shockey News" as playing Big City's Assistant District Attorney.) Jesse Camacho, and Mike Beaver. (Note: Credited in 3 episodes: "Cause of Death," "The Butterfly Is to Blame," and "Big City Smack Down" as playing Deputy Mayor Travis Purdy.)

- Larry Bowman (Bruce McCulloch), a former US draft dodger, mayor and former hockey coach of Shuckton. Although shown abusing the powers of his office, he is beloved by the townspeople.
- Marilyn Bowman (Dave Foley) is Larry's unhappy alcoholic wife. As requested in the mayor's will, Marilyn becomes mayor and seeks economic development opportunities for the town.
- Rampop (Landon Reynolds-Trudel) is Larry and Marilyn's adopted son. He responds to questions with screeches and chirps, he flails his arms when he runs, and he sees all humans as large animated butterflies. His mother calls him "special" but Rampop is the only member of his family who knows which remote control turns on the TV and is the only one who can see Death in his true form and communicate with him.
- Marnie (Kevin McDonald) is a middle-aged delivery driver for the local pizzeria who is prone to frequent spells of forgetfulness she refers to as "the Fuzzies."
- Ricky Jarvis (McCulloch) is an obese man who has not left his house since he lost a hockey tournament; as the captain of the town's hockey team, he lost all his stamina in sex with a rival team's cheerleader the night before the final game.
- Crimson "Crim" Hollingsworth (Scott Thompson) is a small-time criminal who self-identifies as one-sixteenth Ojibwe. He is the prime suspect of Larry's murder.
- Corrinda Gablechuck (Mark McKinney) is the field reporter for the local TV news. After becoming pregnant with Shaye's child, she becomes conflicted on whether to stay pregnant or have an abortion.
- Heather Weather (Thompson) is the weather reporter for the local TV news. She battles Corrinda for the spotlight. She is suspected of the murder when Marilyn learns Heather may have had an affair with Larry.
- Levon Blanchard (Foley) is the news producer, visibly frustrated by Corrinda and Heather's rivalry.
- Shaye (McDonald) is the news team's boom microphone operator. He sleeps with Corrinda only after being rejected by other women at the local bar.
- Dusty Diamond (Thompson) is the town coroner who secretly harboured feelings for Mayor Bowman.
- "Big City" (McCulloch) is a lawyer who is prosecuting Crim for the murder of Larry Bowman. He uses showmanship to dazzle the judge and jury.
- Sam Murray (McDonald) is the inexperienced local public defense lawyer. Not understanding quality of life, he incurs expensive veterinarian bills keeping his sick 32-year-old cat, Buttonhole, alive.
- Death (McKinney) is a grim reaper assigned to collect souls from Shuckton. He has a personal vendetta against Ricky – who was supposed to be aborted before he was born, but who survived the procedure because Death was late to collect his soul. When off duty, he hangs out at the tavern, drinking owl's blood and flirting with voluptuous red-headed women.
- Dr. "Doc" Porterhouse (Foley) is the kindly town abortion care provider. He is a talented doctor but uses odd tools and methods.
- The Judge (McKinney) presides over Crim's murder trial. He is shown to be frustrated by the disappearance of his gavel and the gavel's replacements.
- The Police Officers (McCulloch and McKinney) are investigating Mayor Bowman's murder.

== Episodes ==
No.	Title	Directed by	Written by	Original release date
1	"Death Checks In"	Kelly Makin	Bruce McCulloch & Kevin McDonald	January 12, 2010
While the town of Shuckton is optimistic for its 2028 Summer Olympic bid, Death checks into a nearby motel. After it is announced that the bid has been rejected, Mayor Larry Bowman and his wife become depressed and drunkenly argue in their home. She leaves him alone in their house where Larry is murdered. Death arrives to collect the Mayor's soul which he snorts like cocaine.
2	"Who Mailed Our Mayor?"	Kelly Makin	Bruce McCulloch & Scott Thompson	January 19, 2010
The mayor's corpse is found the next morning, standing on his lawn with his head stuffed into his mailbox. The town reacts to the news that Mayor Bowman has been murdered, and Ricky Jarvis reflects on the time he disappointed Bowman and the whole town, when he was the star player and Bowman the coach of the town hockey team, when he physically exhausted himself the night before the big game having sex with the rival team's head cheerleader. The police have no suspects, and coroner Dusty collects nearly everything in the house as evidence for his own use. Death sends pizzas to Ricky, who chokes but survives completely unaware of Death's presence. The police find small-time criminal Crim covered in blood, and he instantly becomes their prime suspect in the Mayor's murder.
3	"The Stages of Grief"	Kelly Makin	Kevin McDonald & Dave Foley	January 26, 2010
Crim claims he does not remember murdering anyone. Coroner Dusty cannot bring himself to do an autopsy on Mayor Bowman. Marilyn Bowman is appointed a grief counselor to help her deal with her husband's death. The mayor's will is read in which he appoints his wife as interim mayor. A bored Death reflects on the reason he is stuck in Shuckton: several years ago a night of partying made him sleep too late the next morning and he missed collecting the soul of an aborted baby – allowing the baby to survive. At Bowman's wake Dusty steals the corpse. Death goes to Bowman's funeral where Bowman's adopted son, Rampop, communicates with Death telepathically. Ricky begins his investigation into Bowman's murder, but is hampered by his fear of leaving his house. Upon reviewing the funeral footage for suspects, Ricky notices Death for the first time, whose image comes to life on the screen and insults him, blowing out the TV.
4	"Big City Smack Down"	Kelly Makin	Scott Thompson & Mark McKinney	February 2, 2010
Marilyn Bowman begins her first day as Mayor, only to discover her husband was cheating on her with Heather Weather. The Prosecutor "Big City" arrives in town and insults everyone he encounters. Weather reporter Heather Weather spreads rumors that news reporter Corrinda Gablechuck is pregnant with the child of equipment operator Shaye, all while trying to seduce Shaye. Public Defense Attorney Sam Murray meets with Crim to discuss their case, and Crim is worried that he is more qualified than Sam. Corrinda and Heather almost get into a fight at the bar over Shaye until Marilyn and the police officers show up to arrest Heather as a suspect in the mayor's murder. Death continues his drunken antics and bullying of Ricky, though Ricky is oblivious to the person doing it.
5	"The Butterfly Is to Blame"	Kelly Makin	Kevin McDonald & Mark McKinney	February 9, 2010
Heather is released from jail due to lack of evidence. Corrinda consults the abortion care provider, but learns that this pregnancy would be her last as she has no more eggs. Dusty becomes more intimate with Bowman's corpse. Ricky has Marnie go to the trial with a spy camera and notices that Marilyn is absent. The trial starts with each side's opening statements though Murray is late and unprepared. Crim fires Murray and represents himself only to announce that he remembers a drug induced vision where his spirit bear told him to kill the mayor. Murray manages to get this statement stricken from the record, and Crim re-hires him and makes them blood brothers. Heather presents herself as Corrinda's potential replacement during Corrinda's maternity leave. However, Heather is killed in the courtroom with Death and Rampop as the only witnesses.
6	"Cause of Death"	Kelly Makin	Kevin McDonald & Bruce McCulloch	March 2, 2010
Corrinda is questioned concerning Heather's death, but is released after Shaye brings forth footage of Corrinda complaining about Heather during the time of the murder. Crim's trial continues during which he is able to defend himself against charges of killing Heather, despite being in jail at the time. Dusty is called as the first witness and reveals that he never finished the autopsy and so the Judge orders Larry's corpse exhumed. The police, on a tip from Ricky, begin to investigate Death starting with a raid on his motel room but Death escapes. Ricky has Marnie investigate the Bowman house as he watches with the spy camera and comes to the conclusion that one of the many remote controls was used as the murder weapon. Dusty brings Larry's corpse to the cemetery and digs up his grave and empty coffin but accidentally falls into the grave, knocked unconscious on top of the corpse. Marnie is caught in the Bowman house by Marilyn. Marnie lets it slip she is working for Ricky and Marilyn reveals that Larry is Ricky's father.
7	"Serious Shockey News"	Kelly Makin	Scott Thompson & Dave Foley	March 9, 2010
Dusty is caught in his grave with his pants down on Larry's corpse. Worried about Marnie Ricky leaves his house for the first time in years. The trial begins closing arguments, with Big City showing how various objects could be the missing murder weapon and wooing the crowd with promises of vengeance. Ricky finds Marnie, who accidentally reveals herself to be Ricky's mother and that Larry is his father. Larry pressured her into abortion but he survived and was cared for by Dr. Porterhouse before being given to an orphanage. Crim's lawyer presents how the evidence is all circumstantial and that Crim is being misjudged, only to screw the speech up at the last second. Marnie shows Ricky a bloody remote control she took from the Bowman house, which Ricky believes to be the murder weapon. The Jury declares Crim guilty and the Judge sentences Crim to the death penalty. Corrinda has a breakdown on air and opens a public poll on whether she should give birth or have an abortion. At his motel room Death is instructed to collect the souls of three more people.
8	"Dead Man Walking"	Kelly Makin	Bruce McCulloch & Dave Foley	March 16, 2010
Crim prepares for his execution with a last meal and confesses that he does not have any First Nations ancestry. Death kills Sam Murray's cat Buttonhole and receives a message that Crim is next. Crim is given a choice on the means of execution and chooses to die by pulsating light due to his epilepsy, but Marnie and Ricky stop the execution, accusing Marilyn of killing Larry only to have Marnie reveal that she is the murderer. Marnie explains that she delivered a pizza to Larry that night and he told her that he knows Ricky is his son and plans to kill him. Marnie killed Larry and got an intoxicated Crim to hide his body. Marnie goes on to say she also killed Heather Weather as she thought she was going to expose Ricky's secret, when in fact she was speaking about Corrinda's baby. Crim is freed and Marnie is put in the electric chair. Corrinda declares she is going to keep her baby. Crim proclaims he has cheated death, enraging Death, who decides to kill Ricky revealing it was his abortion he had missed. He and Ricky fight, resulting in Ricky destroying Death's phone. Death tells the crowd that he is all-powerful and responsible for Larry's, Heather's, and eventually everybody's death, which Marilyn takes as a confession, and so straps him into the electric chair. Shortly after, Death leaves town but before he goes he fixes Rampop's butterfly problem and gives him his bike. Dusty throws himself in front of the Death's bus, and he is killed and reunited with Larry, who is far more interested in Heather.

== Production and style ==
During a reunion tour in summer 2008, The Kids in the Hall comedy troupe decided they would like to work together again. Since their 1996 movie Brain Candy, during which they had a falling out over creative differences, they had only worked together on live comedy tours and had not appeared on television together since the end of their show in 1995. Bruce McCulloch pitched a television story idea which the rest of the group liked. They spent a couple days together brainstorming and developing characters. The storyline resolved into a murder mystery miniseries – partly inspired by the British comedy series The League of Gentlemen. McCulloch described it as Corner Gas meets Twin Peaks. The format diverged from their typical sketch comedy style by following a continuous narrative – though side-stories explore characters further. Along with producer Susan Cavin in fall 2008, they pitched the concept to CBC executive Fred Fuchs who greenlit the project.

The troupe hired several of the people they had worked with on Brain Candy, including Craig Northey and director Kelly Makin. They shot the series in North Bay, along with locations in Mattawa and Sturgeon Falls, Ontario, which allowed them to access federal and provincial funding incentives for economic development in Northern Ontario. For example, the courtroom scenes were filmed in North Bay's Trinity United Church and the graveyard site was filmed on Mattawa's Explorer's Point. McKinney has claimed in interviews that the red vest worn by Death was found in a storehouse of old CBC props and costumes, and was previously worn by Bob Homme in The Friendly Giant. While drafting the script, cast member Scott Thompson was diagnosed with stage one non-Hodgkin lymphoma. He began chemotherapy sessions shortly before the August – September 2009 shooting dates and started four weeks of radiation treatment once shooting wrapped.

== Broadcast and reception ==
The series was aired on CBC Television as eight 30-minute shows. It was broadcast between January 12 and March 16, 2010, on Tuesdays at 9 pm following news-comedy shows Rick Mercer Report and This Hour Has 22 Minutes. Death Comes to Town was one of three new prime-time shows that CBC launched in the second week of January; the others were a detective comedy-drama Republic of Doyle and a family-oriented situation comedy 18 to Life. The debut of Death Comes to Town was watched by approximately 1.054 million viewers (60% in the 25-54 age demographic), higher than both Republic of Doyle and 18 to Life. The American cable network Independent Film Channel purchased the US broadcast rights and began broadcasting it on August 20, 2010.

In the Winnipeg Free Press, Brad Oswald reviewed the show cautiously, writing it that is "decidedly different, distinctly weird and definitely-an-acquired-taste kind of great" and that some characters and scenes "are edgy and uncompromising and sure to shock and offend nearly as many viewers as they amuse." In the Toronto Star Raju Mudhar wrote that the "humour is classic Kids, with plenty of visual gags mixed with off-colour, politically incorrect jokes" and that "the troupe's eye for satire remains sharp as ever". John Doyle in The Globe and Mail wrote a negative review concluding it was "a dismal coda to the comedy troupe's outstanding career". Doyle identified himself as a fan of the original The Kids in the Hall series but found that this show had "excruciatingly awful attempts at humour" and "no comic rhythm". Doyle called it "appallingly slow-witted TV", "mediocre and maddeningly pointless". In the Times-Colonist, Alex Strachan provided a qualified positive review writing that it was "juvenile, sophomoric and deliberately unsophisticated" but "a joy to watch". Strachan concludes that "Death Comes to Town is easy to dismiss as being lightweight, which it is, and scattershot, which it is. There's a genuine joie de vivre at work, though. Death Comes to Town is silly comedy for smart people."

== Home media ==
The complete mini-series was released on Region 1 DVD by Alliance Home Entertainment on August 3, 2010.
