= Bedbugs (album) =

Studio album by Odds
- Released: May 11, 1993
- Genre: Alternative rock
- Length: 42:32
- Label: Zoo Entertainment
- Producers: Jim Rondinelli and Odds

Odds chronology
Neopolitan (1991)	Bedbugs (1993)	Good Weird Feeling (1995)

Singles from Bedbugs
- 1. "Heterosexual Man" Released: 1992; 2. "It Falls Apart" Released: 1993; 3. "Jack Hammer" Released: 1993; 4. "Yes (Means It's Hard to Say No)" Released: 1994; 5. "Love of Minds" Released: 1994

Professional ratings
Review scores
Source	Rating
Allmusic	3.5/5 stars

Bedbugs is the second studio album by Canadian rock band Odds, released in 1993.

The album's lead single, "Heterosexual Man", was supported by a video that featured the band appearing in drag with members of The Kids in the Hall. "It Falls Apart" was also a notable single. "Jack Hammer", which was released as the third single from the album, features guest appearances by Robert Quine and Warren Zevon. "Yes (Means It's Hard to Say No)" charted well in many European countries. Three singles from the album reached #1 on RPM's Canadian Content chart.

"Heterosexual Man" was featured in the 1995 film Jury Duty.

== Track listing ==
All songs written by Odds.

No.	Title	Length
1.	"Jack Hammer"	3:20
2.	"Sweetness & Love"	3:17
3.	"Car Crash Love"	3:37
4.	"Yes (Means It's Hard to Say No)"	3:13
5.	"It Falls Apart"	3:38
6.	"Heterosexual Man"	3:35
7.	"Do You Know"	3:48
8.	"Love of Minds"	3:24
9.	"The Best Things"	3:43
10.	"The Little Death"	4:02
11.	"What I Don't Want"	3:08
12.	"Fingerprints"	3:47
Total length:		42:32
