= Paul Brennan (Canadian musician) =

Canadian musician

Paul Brennan is a Canadian musician. As a drummer, Brennan has been a member of Big Electric Cat, the Animal Slaves, Odds, and Big Sugar. He has also contributed as a guest musician on albums by Meryn Cadell, Sarah McLachlan, Taste of Joy, Julie Ann Bertram, and Mae Moore. He is currently playing with Alannah Myles and Ellis Meek and performing locally in Toronto.

== Career ==
Brennan was a founding member of the Vancouver band Odds in 1987; the same musicians also performed cover tunes locally under the name Dawn Patrol. Odds recorded their first album, Neapolitan, in 1991; a single from the album, "Love is the Subject", appeared on local radio charts. In 1992, the band toured as the backup band for American rock singer Warren Zevon.

By 1994, Brennan had left the Odds, although he continued to perform in Dawn Patrol. He contributed percussion to Mae Moore's 1995 album Dragonfly.

Brennan moved to Toronto and joined the band Big Sugar in 1996. He was the drummer for their album Hemi-Vision, which was nominated for a Juno Award in 1997. The band toured in western Canada in support of the album.

In 1997, Brennan drummed on Meryn Cadell's album Blocks 6.

Brennan performed with Luke Doucet as part of the NXNE festival in Toronto in 2002. He was the drummer for Doucet's 2004 album Outlaws.

In 2018, Brennan continues to perform locally in Toronto with the band The Two Fours and hosts an open mic at the Relish Bar and Grill.
