= Good Weird Feeling =

Studio album by Odds
- Released: January 31, 1995
- Recorded: at Mushroom Studios, Vancouver
- Genre: Alternative rock
- Length: 55:18
- Label: Elektra
- Producer: Nigel the Cat

Odds chronology
Bedbugs (1993)	Good Weird Feeling (1995)	Nest (1996)

Singles from Good Weird Feeling
- 1. "Truth Untold" Released: 1995; 2. "Eat My Brain" Released: 1995; 3. "Satisfied" Released: 1995; 4. "I Would Be Your Man" Released: 1995; 5. "Mercy to Go" Released: 1996

Professional ratings
Review scores
Source	Rating
Allmusic	3/5 stars

Good Weird Feeling is the third studio album by Canadian rock band Odds. The album featured the singles "Truth Untold", "Eat My Brain", "Satisfied", "Mercy To Go" and " I Would Be Your Man".

== Reception ==
=== Critical ===
Good Weird Feeling was nominated for "Favourite New Release" at the 1995 CASBY Awards. Music journalist Larry LeBlanc included the album in his list of Top 10 records of 1995, ranking it #5. The album was nominated for "Best Rock Album" at the 1996 Juno Awards.

=== Commercial ===
Good Weird Feeling became the most commercially successful album by Odds, being certified Platinum in Canada. By November 1996, the album had sold 130,000 units in Canada.

== Track listing ==
1. "Truth Untold" (3:54)
2. "Smokescreen (Come and Get Me)" (3:46)
3. "Radios of Heaven" (4:08)
4. "I Would Be Your Man" (3:26)
5. "Satisfied" (3:00)
6. "Break the Bed" (5:13)
7. "Oh Sorrow, Oh Shame" (4:29)
8. "Eat My Brain" (4:25)
9. "The Last Drink" (3:09)
10. "Anybody Else but Me" (3:50)
11. "Mercy to Go" (5:17)
12. "Leave It There" (6:25)
13. "We'll Talk" (4:16)
