= Kids in the Hall: Brain Candy =

1996 Canadian comedy film by Kelly Makin

- Theatrical release poster
- Directed by: Kelly Makin
- Written by: Norm Hiscock; Bruce McCulloch; Kevin McDonald; Mark McKinney; Scott Thompson
- Produced by: Lorne Michaels
- Starring: Dave Foley; Bruce McCulloch; Kevin McDonald; Mark McKinney; Scott Thompson
- Cinematography: David A. Makin
- Edited by: Christopher Cooper
- Music by: Craig Northey
- Production companies: Lakeshore Entertainment; Broadway Video
- Distributed by: Paramount Pictures
- Release date: April 12, 1996
- Running time: 89 minutes
- Country: Canada
- Language: English
- Budget: $8 million
- Box office: $2.6 million

Kids in the Hall: Brain Candy is a 1996 Canadian comedy film written by and starring the Canadian comedy troupe The Kids in the Hall. Directed by Kelly Makin and filmed in Toronto, it followed the five-season run (1988–1995) of their television series The Kids in the Hall, which had been successful in both Canada and the United States.

== Plot ==
The five-man team plays all of the major characters and many of the bit parts. The film was written by four of the five members of the troupe, along with Norm Hiscock; the troupe's fifth member, Dave Foley, had quit the troupe and was already working as a cast member on NewsRadio, but was contractually obligated to be in the film. Foley also plays fewer characters in the film than do the other four members. Brendan Fraser and Janeane Garofalo have cameos in the film, Garofalo's being almost entirely absent from the final cut.

The film is about the introduction of a high dose antidepressant, Gleemonex. The drug is rushed into production to help the ailing Roritor Pharmaceuticals and becomes an overnight media sensation. Those involved in the early stages of Gleemonex – the scientists, marketing arm and several early users – are followed, right up through the coma-like side effect of being stuck in their happiest memory.

== Cast ==
- Marv (Dave Foley) is Roritor's assistant. Despite their seemingly close relationship, he actually dislikes Roritor to the point that his happiest memory is urinating into his boss's latte (Roritor's happiest moment, ironically, is drinking the concoction).
- Alice (Bruce McCulloch) is a fellow scientist and apparent love interest of Chris. She eventually watches from a distance as he slips away into celebrity.
- Grivo (Bruce McCulloch) is a rock star famous for his bleak and pessimistic rock as well as a general indifference toward his audience, fame, and music. After taking the drug, Grivo switches to jangly, upbeat pop music; his new song "Happiness Pie" becomes an anthem for the post-Gleemonex world and wins a "World Music Video Award" for it (much to the disappointment of the former fans of his moody angst music). McCulloch loosely based Grivo's image off heavy metal singer Glenn Danzig.
- Chris Cooper (Kevin McDonald, Jason Barr, younger) is the inventor of the drug and main protagonist of the film. He is motivated by the clumsy suicide of his father (also played by McDonald) to create a cure for clinical depression but quickly gets swept up in the resulting fame.
- Don Roritor (Mark McKinney) heads Roritor Pharmaceuticals, founded on his invention of the drug Stummies (likely a play on Tums or Rolaids). He has a close but contentious relationship with his spineless assistant, Marv. (Roritor's speaking style is openly derived from McKinney's impersonation of producer Lorne Michaels.)
- Mrs. Hurdicure (Scott Thompson) is an old woman who initially is severely depressed and an early test subject for Gleemonex (referred to as "Patient 957"). Her happiest memory is shown to be a brief and obligatory Christmas visit from her son, played by Dave Foley. The drug quickly whips her out of the depression, but she inevitably becomes the first victim of its side effect. She is also the test subject for its antidote, a depressant.
- Wally Terzinsky (Scott Thompson) is a husband, father, and closeted homosexual. Wally masturbates to gay pornography, frequents public bath houses, and was sexually active with men during his military service – but remains unaware of his sexual orientation. He is prescribed Gleemonex by a frustrated therapist, (Dave Foley) ("You're gay. I know it, your family knows it... dogs know it!"). His happiest memory is a homoerotic Army mission fantasized by Wally while being chewed out by his drill instructor (Mark McKinney). Wally finds himself standing considerably closer to his drill instructor when through fantasizing. Shortly after this, he finally admits (via song and dance) that he is in fact, homosexual.

Some characters from the television series appear briefly in Brain Candy. Among those who do are the "white trash couple," the cops, Cancer Boy (see below), talk show host Nina Bedford (introduced in the show as "Nina Spudkneeyak"), Raj & Lacey, Melanie, Bellini, and the bigoted cab driver (who narrates the film).

- Ginny Hurdicure (Kathryn Greenwood)
- Raymond's kid (Amy Smith)
- Raymond's kid (Lachlan Murdoch)
- Cooper's groupie (Nicole de Boer)
- Cooper's groupie (Krista Bridges)
- Wally Jr. (Christopher Redman)

== Controversy ==
The film received negative feedback due to the Cancer Boy character. Originally appearing in the final episode of the TV series, in a sketch that satirized the idea of being as offensive as possible, Cancer Boy is played by Bruce McCulloch dressed in a bald cap, with pale white makeup, using a wheelchair. He relays depressing information with a cheerful smile and releases the hit pop single, "Whistle When You're Low". Many found the character to be in exceedingly poor taste. Paramount Pictures had fought with the troupe to cut the character from the film. The group has expressed some regret over their hardline position years later, feeling the battle left Paramount bitter and reluctant to fully market the film.

== Reception ==
On Rotten Tomatoes, it has a score of 48% based on reviews from 48 critics. The consensus summarizes: "Despite its vibrant visual style and scattered moments of signature Kids in the Hall absurdity, Brain Candy labors to find laughs amidst its uneven and overextended story." On Metacritic, it has a score of 55% based on reviews from 23 critics, indicating "mixed or average reviews".

Siskel and Ebert were split, and they had a heated disagreement over Brain Candy on their weekly review show: Gene Siskel gave the movie three-and-a-half stars, calling the movie "audacious, clever, very funny" and predicted it would become a midnight cult film; Roger Ebert gave the film one star, stating that he did not laugh once during the screening and found it "awful, terrible, dreadful, stupid, idiotic, unfunny, labored, forced, painful, bad." Janet Maslin of The New York Times called the film "[nothing] more than a sloppy showcase for the group's costume-changing tricks." Edward Guthmann at The San Francisco Chronicle, called Brain Candy "a splendid showcase for their diverse, frisky talents." Marc Savlov of The Austin Chronicle called it "one long sketch that never seems to rocket off into the inspired heights of lunacy the series maintained so well".

The film suffered poor box office returns. This was turned into a plot device in the opening episode of the 2022 Amazon Prime Video revival series of The Kids in the Hall. As the first episode opens, the movie is under a curse because of its poor sales. With the purchase of a VHS copy at a garage sale, the movie finally breaks even; the curse is lifted, the Kids are exhumed, and the new series begins.

The Kids themselves have expressed mixed feelings over the finished product, most notably on the behind-the-scenes DVD of their 2000 tour, Same Guys, New Dresses. The troupe took a four-year hiatus after Brain Candy's release, though the break-up was already in motion even before filming was underway.

In 2014, the troupe reunited to perform a live reading of the film's screenplay at the Toronto Sketch Comedy Festival.

In 2023, Barry Hertz of The Globe and Mail named the film as one of the 23 best Canadian comedy films ever made.

== Alternate title and ending ==
An original working title for the movie was The Drug, which is what Gleemonex is extensively referred to during the course of the film (in fact, "Brain Candy" is never actually heard in the film). Bruce McCulloch came up with Brain Candy at the studio's request for something more marketable.

Two endings were filmed, with the relatively more upbeat conclusion making the final cut. In the alternate version, Dave Foley plays a crazed activist who leads a militant movement against Gleemonex. Chris Cooper, unable to cope with the mayhem his drug has created, decides to take it himself, and ends up lapsing into a coma. The unused ending has not been officially released, but a leaked workprint was widely traded among fans on the internet during the late 1990s.

== Soundtrack ==
Brain Candy - Music From the Motion Picture Soundtrack

Soundtrack album
- Released: April 9, 1996
- Genre: Movie Soundtrack
- Length: 52:28
- Label: Matador

Professional ratings
Review scores
| Source | Rating |
|---|---|
| Allmusic | link |

A soundtrack album was released the Tuesday prior to the film's release. It consists of music from the film, interspersed with dialog.

1. "Some Days It's Dark" - Death Lurks (Bruce McCulloch as Grivo with Odds) (with film dialog)
2. "Painted Soldiers" - Pavement
3. "Happiness" - Matthew Sweet
4. "Happiness Pie" - Death Lurks
5. "Six Dick Pimp" - Liz Phair (followed by dialog leading into next track)
6. "I'm Gay" - Scott Thompson & Joe Sealy
7. "Spiraling Shape" - They Might Be Giants
8. "Swoon" - Pell Mell
9. "Birthday Cake" - Cibo Matto
10. "Butts Wigglin" - The Tragically Hip
11. "Postal Blowfish" - Guided by Voices
12. "Pablo and Andrea" - Yo La Tengo
13. "How To Play Your Internal Organs Overnight" - Stereolab
14. "Nata di Marzo" - Pizzicato Five
15. "Eat My Brain" - Odds
16. "Long Dark Twenties" - Paul Bellini
17. "Having an Average Weekend" - Shadowy Men on a Shadowy Planet
