= Bruce McCulloch =

Canadian comedian, actor and writer (born 1961)

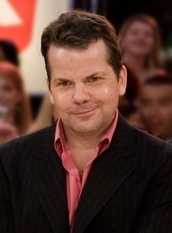
- McCulloch at the 2008 Toronto International Film Festival
- Born: Bruce Ian McCulloch; May 12, 1961 (age 65); Edmonton, Alberta, Canada
- Other name: Brucio (nickname)
- Occupations: Actor; comedian; writer; musician; film director
- Years active: 1987–present
- Spouse: Tracy Ryan (m. 2003)
- Children: 2

Bruce Ian McCulloch (born May 12, 1961) is a Canadian actor, comedian, writer, musician and film director. McCulloch is best known for his work as a member of the comedy troupe The Kids in the Hall, including starring in the TV series of the same name. He was also a writer for Saturday Night Live for one season, 1985–1986. McCulloch has appeared on other series including Twitch City and Gilmore Girls. He directed the films Dog Park, Stealing Harvard and Superstar.

He also wrote and directed the romantic comedy Comeback Season, which toured film festivals before its release on DVD in 2007. He was the creator and head writer of the 2007–2008 ABC sitcom Carpoolers.

== Early life ==
McCulloch was born in Edmonton, Alberta, on May 12, 1961. He attended Strathcona Composite High School in Edmonton and competed in both track-and-field and swimming, winning two individual provincial titles. He moved to Calgary and attended Dr. E.P. Scarlett High School. McCulloch is a graduate of Mount Royal University in Calgary. He got his start in performing sketch comedy in a troupe called The Audience, where he met longtime friend and collaborator Mark McKinney.

== Career ==
=== The Kids in the Hall ===
As a member of the Kids in the Hall comedy troupe, McCulloch starred in the 1989-1995 sketch comedy series The Kids in the Hall, which aired for five seasons in Canada and the United States. For the show, he frequently wrote surreal monologues, films and songs. He also directed several of the filmed sketches. Memorable characters included the Flying Pig, Cabbage Head, talkative schoolchild Gavin, pop starlet Tammy, secretary Kathie, and grumpy middle-aged man Gordon.

McCulloch appeared in the Kids in the Hall's movie Kids in the Hall: Brain Candy, released in 1996. McCulloch drew controversy with his Cancer Boy character, introduced on the series' final episode, in which he plays a dying young cancer patient who relates otherwise depressing news, in monotone, with a cheerful smile, and even releases a hit single entitled "Whistle When You're Low." Paramount Pictures fought to edit out the offending scenes, yet they were kept in. Among other characters, McCulloch also appeared as Grivo, a depressed rock star who becomes upbeat when he starts taking the drug.

He co-wrote, starred in, and was executive producer of the Kids in the Hall 2010 reunion project Death Comes to Town.

=== Music ===
McCulloch has released two albums: 1995's Shame-Based Man, produced by Bob Wiseman (praised by AllMusic as the "most remarkable of comedy albums: one that bears (frequent) repeated listenings") and 2002's Drunk Baby Project. He released a video for the song "The Daves I Know".

McCulloch also directed the music video for the Tragically Hip's song "My Music at Work," for which he won the award of "Best Director" at the 2000 MuchMusic Video Awards. McCulloch was close friends with Tragically Hip frontman Gord Downie. The video shares much in common with many The Kids in the Hall sketches, including its office setting, camera angles, and some thematic elements. McCulloch also starred in and co-directed the music video for 1997's "Make You Mad" by the Canadian band Odds.

=== Movies ===
McCulloch played Fred Wright in the 1987 TV mini-series Anne of Avonlea. In the Watergate comedy film Dick (1999), McCulloch played Washington Post reporter Carl Bernstein (alongside Will Ferrell as Bob Woodward).

McCulloch also co-wrote and had a bit part in Superman's 50th Anniversary: A Celebration of the Man of Steel (1988). In the CBS prime-time special (also featuring Dana Carvey, Al Franken, Jan Hooks, and others), he played a patron of a store that, among other things, sold counterfeit Kryptonite. He also played a Royal Canadian Mounted Police officer in the movie Super Troopers 2.

McCulloch directed the comedy films Dog Park, Superstar, Stealing Harvard, and Comeback Season.

=== Publishing ===
McCulloch's memoir -- Let's Start a Riot: How a Young Drunk Punk Became a Hollywood Dad (ISBN 9781443426398) -- was published by HarperCollins in 2014.

=== Television ===
McCulloch played the judge in "To Kill a Chupacabraj" in season 3 of Workaholics, Father Marsala in season 4 of Arrested Development, and Tobin on Gilmore Girls, the enemy of Michel Gerard. He created and starred in the sitcom Young Drunk Punk, which debuted in 2015, and wrote and played a small part in the 2018 web series This Blows.

In 2019, he signed on as a producer of the Canadian sketch comedy series TallBoyz. In 2023, he was an executive producer of the sketch comedy series The Dessert. In 2023–2025, he had a recurring role as councilman Leonard Flynn on the CTV series Children Ruin Everything (which in the U.S. aired on The CW).

== Personal life ==
He has been married to actress Tracy Ryan since 2003, and they have two children together.

== Discography ==
- Shame-Based Man (1995)
- Drunk Baby Project (2002)
