= Walt Disney Animation Studios short films (2000–present) =

This is a list of short films created by Walt Disney Animation Studios from the year 2000-onwards.

== 2000s ==
| Series | Title | Director | Release Date | DVD/Blu-ray Release | Notes |
|---|---|---|---|---|---|
| —N/a | John Henry | Mark Henn | October 30, 2000 | Disney's American Legends; Walt Disney Animation Studios Short Films Collection | Based on African American folk hero John Henry; Only shown to the general public six times over three days at Hollywood's El Capitan Theatre |
| —N/a | Destino | Dominique Monfery | June 2, 2003; December 19, 2003 | Fantasia and Fantasia 2000 (two movie collection) | Hybrid Animation; Was originally made for a third Fantasia film Pre-screened at Annecy International Animation Film Festival 2003 |
| —N/a | Lorenzo | Mike Gabriel | March 6, 2004; April 6, 2004 | Walt Disney Animation Studios Short Films Collection | Was originally made for a third Fantasia film In theaters with Raising Helen; Pre-screened at Florida Film Festival 2004 |
| —N/a | The Little Matchgirl | Roger Allers | June 6, 2006 | The Little Mermaid (Platinum and Diamond Editions); Walt Disney Animation Studios Short Films Collection | Was originally made for a third Fantasia film Pre-screened at Annecy International Animation Film Festival 2006 |
| Goofy | How to Hook Up Your Home Theater | Stevie Wermers; Kevin Deters | December 21, 2007 | Walt Disney Animation Studios Short Films Collection | In theaters with National Treasure: Book of Secrets; To test Toon Boom Harmony |
| —N/a | Glago's Guest | Chris Williams | June 10, 2008 | —N/a | Computer Animation; Pre-screened at Annecy International Animation Film Festival 2008 |

== 2010s ==
| Series | Title | Director | Release date | DVD/ Blu-ray Release | Notes |
|---|---|---|---|---|---|
| —N/a | Tick Tock Tale | Dean Wellins | June 8, 2010 | Walt Disney Animation Studios Short Films Collection | Computer Animation; Pre-screened at Annecy International Animation Film Festival 2010 |
| —N/a | The Ballad of Nessie | Stevie Wermers; Kevin Deters | March 5, 2011; July 15, 2011 | Winnie the Pooh; Walt Disney Animation Studios Short Films Collection | In theaters with Winnie the Pooh; Pre-screened at Anima Festival 2011 |
| Tangled | Tangled Ever After | Nathan Greno; Byron Howard | January 13, 2012 | Cinderella (Diamond Edition); Walt Disney Animation Studios Short Films Collection | Computer Animation; In theaters with Beauty and the Beast 3D |
| —N/a | Paperman | John Kahrs | June 2012; November 2, 2012 | Wreck-It Ralph; Walt Disney Animation Studios Short Films Collection | Hybrid Animation; In theaters with Wreck-It Ralph; First Disney animated short to win the Academy Award in 43 years. Pre-screened at Annecy International Animation Film Festival 2012 |
| Mickey Mouse | Get a Horse! | Lauren MacMullan | June 11, 2013; November 27, 2013 | Frozen; Walt Disney Animation Studios Short Films Collection; Celebrating Mickey | Combines Hand-drawn & Computer Animation; In theaters with Frozen; Pre-Screened at Annecy International Animation Film Festival 2013 |
| —N/a | Feast | Patrick Osborne | June 10, 2014; November 7, 2014 | Big Hero 6 Walt Disney Animation Studios Short Films Collection | Hybrid Animation; In theaters with Big Hero 6 Pre-screened at Annecy International Animation Film Festival 2014 |
| Frozen | Frozen Fever | Chris Buck; Jennifer Lee | March 13, 2015 | Cinderella; Walt Disney Animation Studios Short Films Collection | Computer Animation; In theaters with Cinderella |
| —N/a | Inner Workings | Leo Matsuda | June 17, 2016; November 23, 2016 | Moana | Combines Hand-drawn & Computer Animation; In theaters with Moana; Pre-screened at Annecy International Animation Film Festival 2016 |
| Frozen | Olaf's Frozen Adventure | Stevie Wermers; Kevin Deters | November 22, 2017 | Olaf's Frozen Adventure | Computer Animation; In theaters with Coco |

== 2020s ==
| Series | Title | Director | Release date | DVD / Blu-ray Release | Notes |
|---|---|---|---|---|---|
| —N/a | Us Again | Zach Parrish | March 5, 2021 | Raya and the Last Dragon | Computer Animation; In theaters with Raya and the Last Dragon |
| —N/a | Far from the Tree | Natalie Nourigat | June 15, 2021; November 24, 2021 | Encanto | Hybrid Animation; In theaters with Encanto; Pre-screened at Annecy International Animation Film Festival 2021 |
| —N/a | Once Upon a Studio | Trent Correy and Dan Abraham | October 15, 2023 (ABC); December 15, 2023 (with Wish in Japan) | Moana (Re-release); Wish (Japan) | Combines hand-drawn animation, computer-animation & live-action Pre-screened at Annecy International Animation Film Festival 2023; In theaters with Wish in Japan and also in theaters with the Disney100 theatrical re-release of Moana. |
| —N/a | Versa | Malcon Pierce | June 11, 2025; March 27, 2026 (Disney+) | —N/a | Computer Animation; Pre-screened at Annecy International Animation Film Festival 2025 |
| Lilo & Stitch | Lilo & Scratch | Fawn Veerasunthorn; Malcon Pierce | June 26, 2026; November 25, 2026 | Hexed | Hybrid Animation; Pre-screened at Annecy International Animation Film Festival 2026; In theaters with Hexed. |

== Non-theatrical shorts ==
Non-theatrical shorts include direct-to-video shorts, which have been released as bonus content on VHS, DVD, Blu-ray, and HD Digital releases of Disney features, as well as Wartime & industrial shorts, educational shorts, and theme park attractions featuring well known characters. The list also includes TV specials, produced by Disney studio and screened by ABC, and shorts released on Disney+.

=== Theme park shorts ===
| Series | Title | Director | Release date | Release format | Notes |
|---|---|---|---|---|---|
| Winnie the Pooh | Pooh's Hunny Hunt | | September 4, 2000 | Theme park attraction | Animation produced by Walt Disney Feature Animation Florida |
| Mickey Mouse | Mickey's PhilharMagic | George Scribner | October 3, 2003 | Theme park attraction | Computer animation |

=== Direct-to-video shorts ===
| Series | Title | Director | Release date | Release format | Notes |
|---|---|---|---|---|---|
| —N/a | One By One | Pixote Hunt | August 31, 2004 | The Lion King II: Simba's Pride | Was originally made for a third Fantasia Film |
| Home on the Range | A Dairy Tale | Will Finn; John Sanford | September 14, 2004 | Home on the Range | Direct-to-DVD short |
| Bolt | Super Rhino | Nathan Greno | March 22, 2009 | Bolt | Computer Animation; Direct-to-DVD short |
| 101 Dalmatians | The Further Adventures of Thunderbolt* | | February 10, 2015 | On Blu-ray/DVD with the original One Hundred and One Dalmatians | |
| Moana | Gone Fishing | John Musker; Ron Clements | February 21, 2017 | Moana | Computer Animation; Direct-to-Blu-ray short |

=== TV specials ===
| Series | Title | Director | Release date | Release format | Notes |
|---|---|---|---|---|---|
| Prep & Landing | Prep & Landing | Stevie Wermers; Kevin Deters | December 8, 2009 | ABC television special | Computer Animation |
| Prep & Landing | Operation: Secret Santa | Stevie Wermers; Kevin Deters | December 7, 2010 | ABC television special | Computer Animation |
| Prep & Landing | Naughty vs. Nice | Stevie Wermers; Kevin Deters | December 5, 2011 | ABC television special | Computer Animation |

=== Internet and Disney+ Original shorts ===
| Series | Title | Director | Release date | Release format | Notes |
|---|---|---|---|---|---|
| Prep & Landing | Tiny's Big Adventure | Stevie Wermers; Kevin Deters | December 9, 2009 | Webtoon | Computer Animation |
| Goofy (starring the character) | Checkin' in with Goofy | | February 16, 2011 | Webtoon | Opening titles homage to golden age cartoons of the 1940s |
| —N/a | Electric Holiday | | November 15, 2012 | Webtoon | |
| Oswald the Lucky Rabbit | Oswald Holiday Greeting Card | | December 1, 2013 | Webtoon | Produced by Disney of Japan. Only 34 seconds in length. |
| Frozen | Once Upon a Snowman | Dan Abraham; Trent Correy | October 23, 2020 | Disney+ | |
| Frozen | Myth: A Frozen Tale | Jeff Gibson | February 26, 2021 | Disney+ | With two minute behind the scene introduction by director Jeff Gibson. |
| Oswald the Lucky Rabbit | Oswald the Lucky Rabbit | Eric Goldberg | December 1, 2022 | Webtoon | |
| —N/a | 8-Bit Strange World | | December 27, 2022 | Webtoon | |
| Donald Duck | D.I.Y. Duck | Mark Henn | June 9, 2024 | Disney+ | |
| —N/a | The Invisible Horse | Dougal Wilson | November 9, 2026 | Webtoon | |

==== Short series ====
| Franchise | Title | Original run | Episodes | Release format | Notes |
|---|---|---|---|---|---|
| | Short Circuit | 2020–2026 | 22 | Disney+ | Anthology series |
| Frozen | At Home With Olaf | 2020 | 21 | Webtoon | Created at home by Hyrum Osmond amidst the ongoing COVID-19 pandemic |
| | Zenimation | 2020-2021 | 18 | Disney+ | Anthology series. Montage of sequences from animated Disney films. |
| Goofy | How to Stay at Home | 2021 | 3 | Disney+ | |
| Frozen | Olaf Presents | 2021 | 5 | Disney+ | |
| Big Hero 6 | Baymax! | 2022 | 6 | Disney+ | |
| Zootopia | Zootopia+ | 2022 | 6 | Disney+ | |

==== Disney internship program shorts ====
The project is under Walt Disney Animation summer internship program (CG & Art intern program), where a group of animation and computer graphics students collaborate and make shorts within two months, under the guidance of Disney animators. The shorts are around 1 minute.

| Title | Release date | Release format |
|---|---|---|
| Ventana | 2017 | Computer Animation |
| Voilà | 2018 | Computer Animation |
| Maestro | 2019 | Computer Animation |
| June Bug | 2021 | Computer Animation |
