= D23 (Disney) =

Official Disney fan club

Disney D23
- Industry: Entertainment
- Founded: March 10, 2009; 17 years ago
- Founder: Bob Iger
- Headquarters: Walt Disney Studios, Burbank, California, United States
- Key people: Adam Sanderson (SVP, corporate communications); Michael Vargo (vice president)
- Owner: The Walt Disney Company
- Website: Official website

D23: The Official Disney Fan Club, also known as simply D23, is the official fan club for the Walt Disney Company. Founded in 2009, the organization is known mainly for its biennial exposition event, D23: The Ultimate Disney Fan Event (previously known as D23 Expo). The name D23 refers to D for Disney and 23 for 1923, which is the year Walt Disney founded the company.

Membership is in two levels: free and gold. Membership includes yearly gifts, events, exclusive merchandise offers, and discount and early access to the Ultimate Disney Fan Event. From D23's inception until winter 2025, gold membership also included a quarterly magazine called Disney twenty-three.

== History ==
D23 logo used from its founding in 2009 until 2023

Bob Iger introduced D23 on March 10, 2009, during the company's annual meeting. D23 had a booth at San Diego Comic-Con in 2009 and held the first D23 Expo from September 10 to 13, 2009. In March 2010, D23 announced that the expo would be biennial instead of annual, and Destination D events would be held in the off year. In February 2013, the Walt Disney Company Japan announced the first D23 Expo Japan would be held from October 12 to 14, 2013.

In April 2013, D23 and Turner Classic Movies Festival teamed up for the 75th anniversary showing of Disney Animation's first feature film Snow White and the Seven Dwarfs (1937), and Kirk Douglas hosted the showing of Disney's 1954 film 20,000 Leagues Under the Sea newly restored from original camera negatives.

Steven Clark stepped down as head of D23 in late September 2013. In January 2014, Adam Sanderson took over as Senior Vice President, Corporate Communications with oversight of the Disney Archives. At the November 21, 2014, weekend event, Destination D, Sanderson indicated that the silver level of membership was being discontinued.

In October 2018, Disney Cruise Line began showing Disney at Sea with D23, a 30-minute entertainment news show that covers the many Disney subsidiaries with input from D23, starting with the ship Disney Wonder.

== Events ==
Events include:

- The Ultimate Disney Fan Event (2009–present) biennial
- Destination D23 (2010–present) a smaller biennial event alternating with the Ultimate Disney Fan Event
- Advance screening
- Disney studio lot screening of past animated films with panel discussion
- Lunch with a Legend (2014–present)
- D23 Day: Walt Disney Studios and Archives members tours held three times a year
- Member VIP studio tours (2015) available to Gold members and are during the work week and include a Disney Legend lunch and a unique VIP gift
- Light Up the Season (2015) original an annual event for employees to mark the start of the holiday season, D23 members have their own version on the studio lot which consists of carols, cocoa, and a tree lighting.
- Member Night at Newsies—On Tour (2015–present)
- Behind-The-Scenes Experiences (2015–present)
- Member mixers at Disney stores, 2nd time in 2016, member only mornings of shopping, discounts, games and goodies
- Disney Fanniversary Celebration

== D23: The Ultimate Disney Fan Event (formerly D23 Expo) ==
The Ultimate Disney Fan Event is biennial featuring:

- Disney Legends award ceremony
- Exclusive first looks at film, television, and streaming projects
- Upcoming attractions for Disney Parks
- Celebrity appearances
- Pop-up stores with exclusive merchandise
- Presentations on Disney history
- Mousequerade fan costume contest
- Emporium for purchasing of collectables from fan vendors (2009–2024)
- Walt Disney Archives curated exhibit
- Fan art contest (2013–present)

In 2022, The New York Times called the event "both awe-inspiring and terrifying to witness because it showcases how deeply the company's products, mythmaking and characters are woven into the cultural fabric."

=== 2009 ===
The first D23 Expo was held at the Anaheim Convention Center in Anaheim, California from September 10 to 13, 2009. It featured pavilions from Walt Disney Imagineering, showcasing models and tests for future attractions, Corporate Responsibility, which feature a photo op, as well as projects for overseas troops and homeless shelters, Disney Consumer Products, showing the many products being sold by Disney within the next few years, a Disney Dream Store, costumes and props from the Walt Disney Archives, a Collectors Forum, where people from all over the country showcased and sold memorabilia.

Events were held in the D23 Arena, Stage 23, Storytellers Theatre, and Walt Disney Studios Theatre. Many future projects were announced, including an expansion of Fantasyland at the Magic Kingdom, an extensive re-hauling of Star Tours for Disneyland and Disney's Hollywood Studios, a film based on the Beatles' Yellow Submarine, Pirates of the Caribbean: On Stranger Tides being revealed as the title for the fourth film in the Pirates of the Caribbean franchise with a "Summer 2011" release, a new Muppet film, as well as clips and sneak previews promoting projects such as Prep & Landing, Tangled, Beauty and the Beast in 3-D, a set of viral Muppet videos, and a film series with Guillermo del Toro.

Celebrity appearances included John Travolta, Nicolas Cage, Patricia Heaton, Kelsey Grammer, Tim Burton, Selena Gomez, Donny Osmond, Tom Bergeron, Kym Johnson, Betty White, Robin Williams, Joseph Fiennes, Johnny Depp (as Captain Jack Sparrow), as well as live performances by Miley Cyrus, Honor Society, and The Muppets.

=== 2011 ===
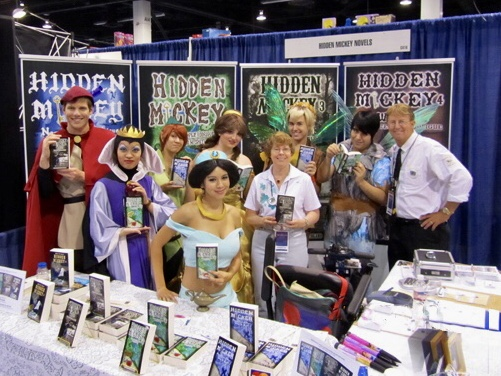
The Hidden Mickey booth in the Collectors Forum of D23 Expo 2011

The second D23 Expo was held at the Anaheim Convention Center in Anaheim, California from August 19 to 21, 2011. The Treasures of the Walt Disney Archives has expanded by 12,000 square feet (1,100 m^{2}) since the Inaugural D23 Expo. The show floor also featured a new pavilion, similar to the Walt Disney Imagineering pavilion from D23 Expo 2009, Walt Disney Parks and Resorts's Carousel of Projects which shows the highlights of the developing projects coming soon in Disney Parks around the world.

Shopping opportunities included the D23 Expo Dream Store returning from the inaugural Expo. Other D23 Expo-exclusive stores included Mickey's of Glendale from Walt Disney Imagineering headquarters in Glendale, California and the Walt Disney Archives Treasure Trove from the Walt Disney Archives in Burbank, California. Other stores include A Small World Village and a Disney Store in the Disney Living Pavilion. Another popular area was the Collectors Forum, where guests could buy Disney Collectibles and connect with the Disneyana Fan Club, Mouse Planet, Mice Chat, Hidden Mickey author Nancy Temple Rodrigue, and artist Brian Rood with his one-of-a-kind The Rocketeer.

Events took place at the D23 Arena, Stage 23, Stage 28, the "red carpet" at the Talent Round-Up area, Storytellers Stage at the Disney Living pavilion, and at the Disney Channel/Radio Disney stage. The Disney Channel stage held performances from Coco Jones, China Anne McClain, a first look for Radio Disney's N.B.T. (Next Big Thing), and a karate exhibition from Leo Howard. Guests also had the chance to meet and greet the cast of Good Luck Charlie, Jake and the Never Land Pirates and The Never Land Band, Lemonade Mouth, So Random!, Phineas and Ferb, Kickin' It, Fish Hooks, A.N.T. Farm, Handy Manny, Special Agent Oso, Pair of Kings, and Shake it Up.

Stage 23 hosted many events involving sneak peeks to projects from Walt Disney Studios and ABC Studios including The Avengers, The Muppets, Brave, Monsters University, Once Upon a Time, and Prep & Landing: Naughty vs. Nice, and the celebration for the 25th Anniversary of Pixar. Stage 28 hosted Walt Disney Imagineering panels for the Disney Cruise Line, Cars Land, Buena Vista Street, Star Tours: The Adventures Continue, The Little Mermaid: Ariel's Undersea Adventure, "The Voices of the Parks", and vintage photos and videos of Disneyland and Walt Disney World.

The first rounds of the UDTT were held on August 18, 2011 (one day before the D23 Expo), which narrowed from thousands to one hundred and from one hundred to 20. It was hosted by Dan Roebuck (guest starred in Lost and Wizards of Waverly Place) who narrowed down the final round from 20 people to 3. After two full days of trivia questions, John Kurowski was declared the winner of the inaugural Ultimate Disney Fan Trivia Tournament. His name was engraved on a Ludwig Von Drake trophy which was preserved in the Walt Disney Archives. Kurowski also won a preview cruise on the Disney Cruise Line's Disney Fantasy ship which set sail to the public in 2012.

The D23 Arena hosted many milestone events only at the D23 Expo. This was the second time that the Disney Legends ceremony had taken place in front of guests at the D23 Expo; it had originally been held at the Walt Disney Studios in Burbank. At the expo, the company honored 12 people who contributed to The Walt Disney Company. This included Jodi Benson, Barton Boyd, Jim Henson, Linda Larkin, Paige O'Hara, Regis Philbin, Anika Noni Rose, Lea Salonga, Ray Watson, Guy Williams, and Jack and Bonita Wrather.

=== 2013 ===
The third D23 Expo was held from August 9 to 11, 2013, at the Anaheim Convention Center. Disney officials later estimated attendance to be around 65,000. Walt Disney Studios presented exclusive looks at live-action films including Saving Mr. Banks, Maleficent, Muppets Most Wanted, Tomorrowland, and Thor: The Dark World, as well as animated productions such as The Good Dinosaur, Frozen, Party Central, Get a Horse!, Finding Dory, and Inside Out. Lucasfilm had its first appearance at the expo with the panel "Crash Course in the Force: Star Wars Saga 101" hosted by Pablo Hidalgo. Walt Disney Parks and Resorts showcased pavilions relating to Avatar Land, future Star Wars attractions, Marvel's Avengers Academy on the Disney Magic, Disney Springs, and Shanghai Disneyland.

=== 2015 ===
The fourth D23 Expo was held from August 14 to 16, 2015, at the Anaheim Convention Center in Anaheim, California. Pixar and Walt Disney Animation Studios presented first looks of The Good Dinosaur, Finding Dory, Zootopia, Moana, Toy Story 4, and Coco. Marvel Studios presented footage from Captain America: Civil War and concept art from Doctor Strange, while Lucasfilm presented a look at Star Wars: The Force Awakens. Walt Disney Pictures showcased Alice Through the Looking Glass, The Jungle Book, Beauty and the Beast, Pirates of the Caribbean: Dead Men Tell No Tales, Pete's Dragon, The Finest Hours, and Queen of Katwe. In addition, the logos for Incredibles 2 and Cars 3 were revealed. Disney Interactive held presentations on several video games, namely Star Wars: Battlefront, Disney Infinity 3.0, and Kingdom Hearts III. The presentations featured new in-game footage, trailers, and reveals. The presentations also included surprise announcements and special guests. At the conclusion of the Walt Disney Studios presentation, Bob Iger made a surprise announcement that Disney was developing a new Star Wars themed land for both Disneyland and Disney's Hollywood Studios. Additional presentations included "Disney on Broadway: The Originals" celebrating the stage adaptations of Disney films by Disney Theatrical Productions, "FROZEN FANdemonium – A Musical Celebration!" which celebrated the music of Frozen, and a celebration of the 20th anniversary of the release of Toy Story.

=== 2017 ===
D23 Expo 2017

The fifth D23 Expo was held from July 14 to 16, 2017, at the Anaheim Convention Center in Anaheim, California. Pixar and Walt Disney Animation Studios presented first looks at Ralph Breaks the Internet, Incredibles 2, and Coco. Lucasfilm presented a behind-the-scenes look at Star Wars: The Last Jedi, Marvel Studios presented a first look at Avengers: Infinity War, and Walt Disney Pictures presented first looks at A Wrinkle in Time, Mary Poppins Returns, The Nutcracker and the Four Realms, and the live-action remake of The Lion King. The cast for the live-action remake of Aladdin was also announced. Walt Disney Parks and Resorts revealed that both new Star Wars-themed lands in Disneyland and Disney's Hollywood Studios would be called Star Wars: Galaxy's Edge and presented a scale model of the land in its pavilion on the expo floor. There were additional presentations for Tangled: The Series and Olaf's Frozen Adventure, as well as a presentation celebrating the 20th anniversary of the release of Hercules. The New York Times estimated attendance for the 2017 expo at around 100,000 people.

=== 2019 ===
The sixth D23 Expo was held from August 23 to 25, 2019, at the Anaheim Convention Center in Anaheim, California. Pixar and Walt Disney Animation Studios presented extended looks at Frozen 2, Onward, Soul, and announced Raya and the Last Dragon. Marvel Studios presented first looks at Black Widow, Eternals, and announced Moon Knight, Ms. Marvel, She-Hulk, and Black Panther: Wakanda Forever. Lucasfilm presented a behind-the-scenes preview at Star Wars: The Rise of Skywalker. Finally, Walt Disney Pictures presented first looks at the live-action remake of Mulan, an extended clip of Maleficent: Mistress of Evil, Jungle Cruise, and the live-action prequel Cruella. This expo also marked the first time that Disney showcased projects from 20th Century Fox, with clips of upcoming films from Ford v Ferrari, Spies in Disguise, and The King's Man. Alan Horn stated that they were not going to announce anything about Fox at the expo, but also noted that more news about Fox would be forthcoming in the future.

=== 2022 ===
The seventh D23 Expo was held from September 9 to 11, 2022, at the Anaheim Convention Center in Anaheim, California. The event was originally expected to be scheduled for 2021, but was pushed back a year due to the COVID-19 pandemic in the United States. D23 Expo 2022 saw the debut of the new production logo of Walt Disney Pictures, created by the Disney Studios Content and Industrial Light & Magic and accompanied by a new arrangement of "When You Wish Upon a Star" composed by Christophe Beck and conducted by Tim Davies. Pixar and Walt Disney Animation Studios presented a first look at Elemental and Strange World, and also announced Inside Out 2, Elio, and Wish. Walt Disney Pictures presented first looks at The Little Mermaid, Peter Pan & Wendy, Disenchanted, Snow White, and Haunted Mansion, and also announced Mufasa: The Lion King. Marvel Studios announced Werewolf by Night and presented exclusive looks at Black Panther: Wakanda Forever, Ironheart, Ant-Man and the Wasp: Quantumania, Loki, Echo, Secret Invasion, and The Marvels. Lucasfilm presented an exclusive first look at Indiana Jones and the Dial of Destiny along with trailers for Tales of the Jedi, The Mandalorian, and Willow. 20th Century Studios announced an Assassin's Creed TV series for Netflix and presented a first look at new scenes from Avatar: The Way of Water. Disney Branded Television presented first looks at multiple shows, including upcoming Disney+ exclusives American Born Chinese, The Muppets Mayhem, and Percy Jackson and the Olympians. Disney also presented panels and exhibits on "Disney100", the then-upcoming yearlong celebration of the 100th anniversary of the company, as well as a "Celebration of Encanto" and a Disney Princess concert featuring Susan Egan and Anneliese van der Pol. The New York Times estimated attendance for the 2022 expo at around 140,000 people.

=== 2024 ===
Entrance to D23 2024 at the Anaheim Convention Center

The eighth D23 fan event was held from August 9 to 11, 2024, at the Anaheim Convention Center in Anaheim, California. Disney dropped the word "Expo", resulting in the name "D23: The Ultimate Disney Fan Event". On August 8, the D23 kickoff celebration took place at Disneyland Resort. From August 9 to 11, shopping pop-ups, exhibits, panels, and presentations were held at the Anaheim Convention Center during the day, and then the largest marquee shows were held at Honda Center in the evening: the Disney Entertainment Showcase (August 9), the Disney Experiences Showcase (August 10), and the Disney Legends Ceremony (August 11). The Guardian noted that the prices of three-day tickets for the event started at just under $300 and went up to $2,599 for the best seats at Honda Center.

Part of the Disney Experiences showcase was viewable in-game on Fortnite and showed a trailer for the next Battle Royale season featuring Doctor Doom.

=== 2026 ===
The ninth D23 fan event was held from August 14 to 16, 2026, at the Anaheim Convention Center, and Honda Center in Anaheim, California. The event also saw the return of D23 Day at Angel Stadium (on August 12) and at Disneyland (on August 13). During the expo, first looks were given at Frozen 3, Incredibles 3, Hexed, Ice Age: Boiling Point, The New Simpsons Movie, a live-action Tangled film, The Bluey Movie, VisionQuest, Avengers: Doomsday, season two of Ahsoka & season three of Percy Jackson and the Olympians, a new Disney Animation film titled Clay was announced along with Zootopia 3, Lilo & Stitch 2 and an Oswald the Lucky Rabbit animated miniseries. From Pixar, new details were given on Gatto, Ghost Market and the sequel to Coco. A Kingdom Hearts television series and the MCU X-Men cast were also revealed, Anne Hathaway gave an update on the Princess Diaries 3, as well as Lisa Kudrow and Mira Sorvino on Romy and Michele 2.

During the week of the event, Disney announced that a selection of panels and showcase presentations would be livestreamed on Disney+ globally, including Beauty and the Beast: A Tale as Old as Time 35th Anniversary Celebration (on August 14), Percy Jackson and the Olympians: Season 3 Panel, Disney Rewind Encore Concert and Horizons: Disney Experiences Showcase (on August 15) and along with Disney Princess: The Ultimate Concert Celebration – Recorded Live from Disneyland Resort, Disney Worldbuilders Panel with Leslie Iwerks and Disney Legends Awards Ceremony (on August 16).

== D23 Japan (formerly D23 Expo) ==
=== D23 Expo Japan 2013 ===
The first D23 Expo Japan was held from October 12 to 14, 2013, in the Maihama area at the Tokyo Disney Resort. This expo celebrated multiple anniversaries, 90th anniversary of the company, Tokyo Disney Resort's 30th, Disney Channel's 10th, Disney Mobile's fifth, the Disney–JCB Card's fifth and Dlife's first.

=== D23 Expo Japan 2015 ===
The second D23 Expo Japan was held from November 6 to 8, 2015 at the Tokyo Disney Resort.

=== D23 Expo Japan 2018 ===
The third D23 Expo Japan was held from February 10 to 12, 2018, at the Tokyo Disney Resort.

== D23 Brazil ==
=== D23 Brazil: A Disney Experience ===
The first D23 Brazil was held from November 8 to 10, 2024, at Transamérica Expo Center in São Paulo, Brazil. On January 11, 2024, during the Consumer Electronics Show, Disney announced that the event would be going global, with D23 heading to São Paulo, Brazil, in November of that year. This was the first time that a Disney convention was held in Brazil.

== D23 Asia ==
=== D23 Asia: The Ultimate Disney Fan Event ===
The first D23 Asia will be held from June 25 to 27, 2027 at Sands Expo & Convention Centre in Marina Bay Sands, Singapore.

== Destination D23 (formerly Destination D) ==
=== Destination D 2010: Disneyland '55 ===
As announced at the annual shareholders meeting in 2010, the D23 Expo did not return in 2010. A then-new event called "Destination D" was held at the Disneyland Hotel ballroom at Disneyland Resort in Anaheim, California from September 24 to 25, 2010. Each year Destination D would have a new theme, with the 2010 event's theme being "Disneyland '55." It is likely that these events would alternate each year.

=== Destination D 2011: Walt Disney World 40th ===
The Destination D event was held from May 14 to 15, 2011, at Disney's Contemporary Resort at Walt Disney World Resort, in honor of Walt Disney World's 40th anniversary.

=== Destination D 2012: 75 Years of Disney Animated Features ===
The Destination D event was held from August 11 to 12, 2012, in the Disneyland Hotel ballroom at Disneyland Resort in Anaheim, California, to celebrate 75 years of Disney Animated features, which was a celebration of the art, storytelling, music, voices, imagination, and innovation of Disney's benchmark films.

=== Destination D 2014: Attraction Rewind ===
The Destination D event was held from November 22 to 23, 2014, at Disney's Contemporary Resort at Walt Disney World Resort.

=== Destination D 2016: Amazing Adventures ===
The Destination D event was held from November 19 to 20, 2016, at Disney's Contemporary Resort at Walt Disney World Resort.

=== Destination D 2018: Celebrating Mickey Mouse ===
The Destination D event was held from November 16 to 18, 2018, at Disney's Contemporary Resort at Walt Disney World Resort.

=== 2020: D23 Fantastic Worlds Celebration ===
The first Destination D23 virtual event was held from November 16 to 20, 2020, online. The full lineup of virtual events and presentation has been announced for the D23 Fantastic Worlds Celebration, which had gone digital due to the COVID-19 pandemic.

=== Destination D23 2021: A Fan-Tastic Disney Celebration ===
The Destination D23 event was held from November 19 to 21, 2021, at Disney's Contemporary Resort at Walt Disney World Resort and online.

=== Destination D23 2023: Celebrating 100 Years of Disney ===
The Destination D23 event was held from September 8 to 10, 2023, at Disney's Contemporary Resort at Walt Disney World Resort and online.

=== Destination D23 2025: A Journey Around The Worlds of Disney ===
The Destination D23 event was held from August 29 to 31, 2025, at Disney's Coronado Springs Resort at Walt Disney World Resort and doubled the size from the previous events. Attendees were able to participate in several events around Walt Disney World, including D23 Kuzcotopia Night at Disney's Typhoon Lagoon to celebrate the 25th anniversary of Disney Animation's The Emperor's New Groove (on August 30), Disney '80s-'90s Celebration in Concert (on August 31), and The Walt Disney Archives Presents: Charting the Course – Disney's Global Stories & Inspirations, along with "A Goofy Movie Throwback Premiere" and D23 Nights at Disney Springs (on August 28), and Mickey's Not-So-Scary Halloween Party During Destination D23 Weekend (on August 29) during the week of the event.

== See also ==
- Disney+ Day
- DC FanDome
- Tudum
- Star Wars Celebration
