= Prep & Landing: The Snowball Protocol =

Disney animated Christmas special

- Official release poster
- Genre: Animated Christmas special
- Based on: Prep & Landing by: Kevin Deters; Stevie Wermers-Skelton; Chris Williams
- Screenplay by: Hilary Helding
- Directed by: Shane Zalvin
- Starring: Dave Foley; Derek Richardson; Sarah Chalke; Manny Jacinto; Dulcé Sloan; Danny Pudi; Christopher Swindle
- Music by: Christopher Willis
- Country of origin: United States
- Original language: English

Production
- Executive producers: Kevin Deters; Stevie Wermers-Skelton
- Producers: Melissa Kurtz; Carson Loveday; Shea Wageman
- Running time: 22 minutes
- Production companies: Disney Television Animation; ICON Creative Studio

Original release
- Network: Disney Channel
- Release: November 27, 2025

Prep & Landing: The Snowball Protocol is an American animated television special, produced by Disney Television Animation, and directed by Shane Zalvin, from a screenplay by Hilary Heldin. It premiered on November 27, 2025, on Disney Channel, and the following day on Disney+. The special is the third 22-minute Christmas special, and the fifth short film in the Prep & Landing series, after Prep & Landing, Tiny's Big Adventure, Operation: Secret Santa, and Naughty vs. Nice. It stars Dave Foley, Derek Richardson, Sarah Chalke, Manny Jacinto, Dulcé Sloan, Danny Pudi, and Christopher Swindle.

== Plot ==
After creating a mess during their most recent outing, Wayne tells Lanny that he is issuing the Snowball Protocol (i.e. do not mention what happened to anyone). When they return to base, Magee tells the two that Santa wants to see them, concerning them. Lanny is called in first and leaves, having told Santa something. When Wayne is called in, Santa tells him that Lanny had informed him of some kind of secret. Trying to deter him from learning about their recent mishap, Wayne recalls two previous incidents he and Lanny were involved in.

Four weeks earlier, Magee asks Wayne and Lanny to watch over her pet seal, Nog, while she goes to a meeting for an hour. Wayne and Lanny immediately lose him and chase him throughout the workshop and all over the North Pole before catching him after he devours a fruitcake. Despite Nog vomiting into Wayne's hat, Magee returns from the meeting none the wiser to their misadventure. Back in January, the elves go on vacation to Yuletide Island where Wayne insists on relaxing, while Magee wants everyone to follow a heavy vacation schedule. To get her off his back, Wayne sets Magee up with Renato, a massage therapist elf who teaches her to relax. Unfortunately, without Magee's guidance, the elves fall into disarray. Wayne owns up to his mistake and gets Magee to come back and help set things right.

When Santa explains that neither of these things were what he was talking about, he reveals that Christmas day also happens to be Wayne's birthday, something that Wayne intentionally overlooks as he doesn't like getting too much attention. Wayne is given a birthday card signed by everyone, except Magee because Lanny forgot to tell her, and he heads to Lanny's house to celebrate.

== Cast ==
- Dave Foley as Wayne, a world-weary, but dedicated elf and Lanny's partner.
- Derek Richardson as Lanny, Wayne's partner.
- Sarah Chalke as Magee, the ambitious command center coordinator, who is obsessed with eggnog lattes
- Manny Jacinto as Renato, the massage therapist and holistic healer of Spa Navidad at the North Pole
- Dulcé Sloan as Janice, a post office clerk at the North Pole and Wayne's ex-girlfriend
- Danny Pudi as Chef Geoff, the master chef at the Fruitcake Factory
- Christopher Swindle as 'The Big Guy' Santa Claus. Swindle replaces the late W. Morgan Sheppard.

== Production ==
In a 2011 interview promoting the fourth entry in the series of Christmas specials, Naughty vs. Nice, creators Kevin Deters and Stevie Wermers-Skelton stated that there were plans for a fifth entry in the series, but that they could not reveal any more about the project. The project ultimately never made it to broadcast, and the two were instead assigned to a different Christmas short, Olaf's Frozen Adventure, in 2016; by this point, the two spoke of the series in the past tense.

At the Annecy International Animation Film Festival in June 2024, it was announced that the franchise was revived at Disney Television Animation with a new 22-minute special called Prep & Landing: The Snowball Protocol, written by Hilary Heldin and directed by Shane Zalvin, while the original franchise creators would serve as executive producers. It was animated by Canadian animation studio ICON Creative Studio. By September 2025, Dave Foley was cast to reprise his role of Wayne, alongside Sarah Chalke as Magee and Derek Richardson as Lanny, while newcomers include Manny Jacinto as Renato, Dulcé Sloan as Janice, Danny Pudi as Chef Geoff, and Christopher Swindle as Santa Claus. Swindle replaces W. Morgan Sheppard, who voiced Santa Claus in the previous entries but died in 2019.

== Release ==
The special was released on November 27, 2025 (Thanksgiving night) on Disney Channel, the first of the series to debut via that channel, and the following day on Disney+. The special was also rerun on ABC on November 30, and on Freeform as part of the 25 Days of Christmas.
