= Prep & Landing (series) =

American short film series

- Poster of the first television special
- Directed by: Kevin Deters; Stevie Wermers
- Starring: Dave Foley; Derek Richardson; Sarah Chalke (More)
- Music by: Michael Giacchino (1–3); Christopher Willis (4)
- Production companies: Walt Disney Animation Studios (most productions); Disney Television Animation (The Snowball Protocol)
- Distributed by: Disney–ABC Domestic Television
- Release dates: December 8, 2009 (1); December 7, 2010 (2); December 5, 2011 (3); November 27, 2025 (4)
- Running time: 95 minutes
- Country: United States
- Language: English
- Budget: 14,000,000

Prep & Landing is a series of computer animated television Christmas specials produced by Walt Disney Animation Studios (2009–2011) and Disney Television Animation (2025). Voices of Dave Foley, Derek Richardson and Sarah Chalke are featured in the specials.

== TV specials ==
=== Prep & Landing (2009) ===
Wayne, a Christmas elf, is part of an elite organization known as "Prep & Landing", whose job is to ready millions of homes around the world for Santa Claus's visit. After working with "Prep & Landing" for 227 years, Wayne looked forward to getting promoted. Instead, Wayne is overlooked by his former partner, and Wayne is introduced to Lanny, a rookie whom Wayne has to also train. Wayne, still bitter about the promotion, decided to slack off during the mission. He permitted Lanny to do all of the work, which is disastrous. Meanwhile, Santa is informed mid-flight of a massive snow storm and that Wayne and Lanny have not fully prepared the house yet. He is told to cancel the landing, which has never happened before, when they promised to make it up for a boy named Timmy, who is living at the house. Wayne and Lanny discovered that the re-routing was a final decision, but after hearing Timmy thanking them in his sleep, Wayne decided to fix it. He called up Santa, telling him that he must land at Timmy's house. Wayne and Lanny then worked together to land Santa safely on Timmy's roof. On Christmas morning, Santa showed Wayne that Timmy had a merry Christmas. Santa offered a promotion to Wayne, but he turned it down so he can work with Lanny.

=== Operation: Secret Santa (2010) ===
Wayne and Lanny, who are now partners, are called by Magee to meet with a secret contact, who turns out to be Mrs. Claus, who sends Wayne and Lanny on a new mission to retrieve a box from Santa's secret workshop. Later they sneak into Santa's office while he is asleep, using their high tech equipment from the previous film. Lanny's expertise at dressing the tree enabled them to enter the hidden workshop where they recovered the box and escaped just in time. Mrs. Claus revealed the contents of the box to be the last part of the first toy that Santa had ever made, and gave the complete toy back to him as his Christmas Present.

=== Naughty vs. Nice (2011) ===
Wayne and Lanny have to recover classified North Pole technology from a hacker after it was stolen from the Coal Elf Brigade, a unit of Christmas elves responsible for children on the naughty list. They have to team up with a member of the Coal Elf Brigade, who turns out to be Noel, Wayne's estranged younger brother. Wayne reluctantly accepts, and the three elves set off to the house. Wayne accidentally triggers a booby trap, which Noel is able to fend off. Lanny is captured by the hacker, who turns out to be a child named Grace Goodwin. She blames her toddler brother Gabriel for her bad behavior, and wants to put herself on the nice list. She manages to, but Noel recovers the device. Angry at being shown up, Wayne yells that he wishes he never had a brother. Noel is hurt, and tells Wayne how he was Noel's hero. Wayne apologizes, and the brothers reconcile. The device malfunctions, and Wayne and Noel pull off a daring mission, saving Christmas. The next day, they're named "Elves of the Year."

=== The Snowball Protocol (2025) ===
After an initially unidentified incident, Wayne invokes a non-disclosure clause called the Snowball Protocol. When Santa Claus calls Lanny and Wayne into his office, Lanny tells Santa a secret. Thinking Lanny has violated the Snowball Protocol, Wayne confesses to the incident—during their recent vacation, Magee attempted to force the elves into a strict schedule during the vacation, to which Wayne responded by pushing Magee to relax. When chaos ensued, Magee snapped into action and restored order. Neither this, nor a separate incident involving Magee's baby seal to which Wayne also confessed, was the secret Lanny told: the secret was in fact regarding Wayne's birthday.

== Short film ==
=== Tiny's BIG Adventure ===
A one-minute short film, titled Tiny's BIG Adventure, was released on-line on December 9, 2009, along with Prep & Landing. It was released on DVD on November 22, 2011, and on DVD/Blu-ray of Prep & Landing: Totally Tinsel Collection, on November 6, 2012.

== Cast and characters ==
Character
Character	Prep & Landing	Operation: Secret Santa	Naughty vs. Nice	The Snowball Protocol
Wayne	Dave Foley	Dave Foley	Dave Foley	Dave Foley
Lanny	Derek Richardson	Derek Richardson	Derek Richardson	Derek Richardson
Magee	Sarah Chalke	Sarah Chalke	Sarah Chalke	Sarah Chalke
Santa Claus	W. Morgan Sheppard	W. Morgan Sheppard	W. Morgan Sheppard	Christopher Swindle
Timmy Terwelp	Mason Vale Cotton		Cameo	
Mrs. Claus		Betty White	Cameo	
Grace Goodwin			Emily Alyn Lind	
Mr. Thistleton			Chris Parnell	
Noel			Rob Riggle	
Crumbles			Phil LaMarr	
Renato				Manny Jacinto
Chef Geoff				Danny Pudi
Janice				Dulcé Sloan

Note: A gray cell indicates character did not appear in that medium.

== In other media ==
Wayne and Lanny appear in the comic book Prep & Landing: Mansion Impossible, where they prepare Avengers Mansion for a visit from Santa. The story was written by Kevin Deters, and illustrated by Joe Mateo, being released on November 16, 2011, in Avengers #19, Marvel Adventures Super Heroes #20, and Marvel Adventures Spider-Man #20.

In 2017, Deters and Wermers were involved in the production of Olaf's Frozen Adventure, an animated short film which is part of Frozen franchise and not part of the Prep & Landing series. A running gag involving fruitcake was carried over from Prep & Landing into Olaf's Frozen Aventure.

Wayne and Lanny are part of the Walt Disney Animation Studios characters that appear in the 2023 short film Once Upon a Studio gathering to take a group photo.

On September 5, 2025, Disney Publishing Worldwide released a Prep & Landing book, as part of the Little Golden Books collection.

The Prep & Landing franchise is the basis for Jingle Bell, Jingle BAM! (November 14, 2016 – January 5, 2020; November 11, 2023 – present), a seasonal holiday-themed nighttime show at Disney's Hollywood Studios at Walt Disney World Resort in Florida.
