= Prep & Landing: Operation: Secret Santa =

2010 animated short television film

- Also known as: Operation: Secret Santa
- Genre: Animated short
- Created by: The Walt Disney Company
- Written by: Kevin Deters; Stevie Wermers-Skelton
- Directed by: Kevin Deters; Stevie Wermers-Skelton
- Starring: Derek Richardson; Dave Foley; Sarah Chalke; Betty White; W. Morgan Sheppard
- Music by: Michael Giacchino
- Country of origin: United States
- Original language: English

Production
- Producer: Dorothy McKim
- Running time: 7 minutes
- Production companies: Walt Disney Animation Studios; Walt Disney Pictures

Original release
- Network: ABC
- Release: December 7, 2010

Operation: Secret Santa — A Prep & Landing Stocking Stuffer is an American animated short film sequel to 2009's Christmas special Prep & Landing, produced by Walt Disney Animation Studios, and directed by Kevin Deters and Stevie Wermers-Skelton. The short premiered on TV channel ABC on Tuesday, December 7, 2010. The second half-hour Christmas TV special in the Prep & Landing series, Prep & Landing: Naughty vs. Nice aired on December 5, 2011, on ABC.

== Plot ==
Wayne and Lanny, now partners, are called by Magee to meet with a secret contact – Mrs. Claus, who sends them on a new mission to retrieve a box from Santa's secret workshop. Later they sneak into Santa's office while he is asleep, using their high tech equipment from the previous film. Lanny's expertise at dressing the tree enables them to enter the hidden workshop where they recover the box and escape just in time. Mrs. Claus reveals the contents of the box to be the last part of the first toy that Santa ever made, and gives the complete toy (a wooden duck on wheels) back to him as his Christmas Present.

== Cast ==
- Derek Richardson as Lanny
- Dave Foley as Wayne
- Sarah Chalke as Magee
- Betty White as Mrs. Claus
- W. Morgan Sheppard as Santa Claus (credited as "The Big Guy")

== Release ==
Prep & Landing: Operation: Secret Santa aired on TV channel ABC on Tuesday, December 7, 2010.

The short was released on the Prep & Landing DVD on November 22, 2011, accompanying the original special and the short film Tiny's Big Adventure. It was also released on DVD and Blu-ray of Prep & Landing: Totally Tinsel Collection on November 6, 2012, together with Prep & Landing, Naughty vs. Nice, and Tiny's BIG Adventure. It was released on the Walt Disney Animation Studios Short Films Collection Blu-ray on August 18, 2015.

== See also ==
- List of Disney animated shorts and featurettes
- Walt Disney Animation Studios
