= Dorothy McKim =

American film producer

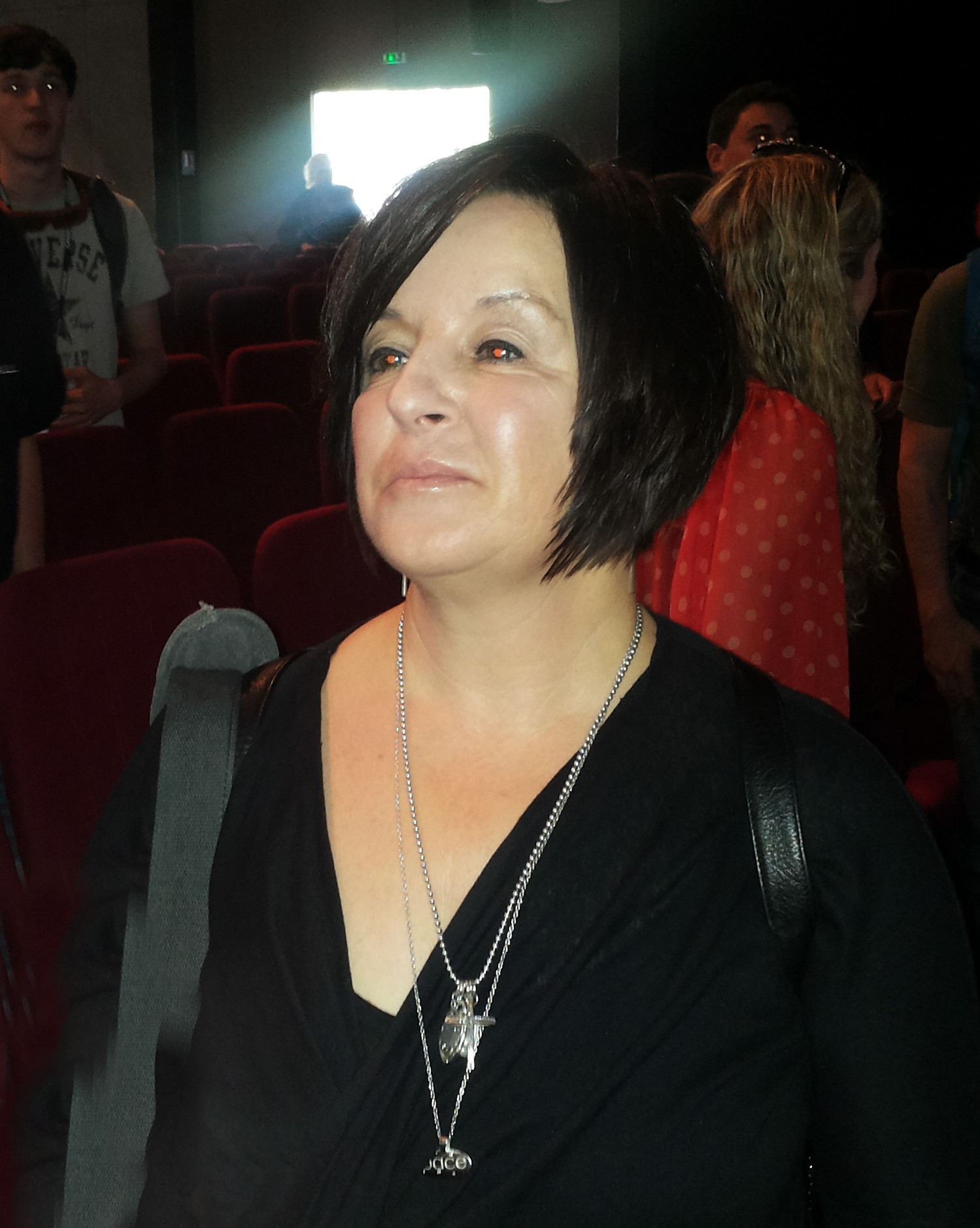
- Dorothy McKim (2013)
- Born: Chatsworth, California, United States
- Occupation: Film producer
- Years active: 1984-present

Dorothy McKim is an American film producer, best known for Meet the Robinsons. McKim and fellow producer Lauren MacMullan were nominated for an Academy Award for Best Animated Short Film for the 2013 film Get a Horse!.

She served as the inspiration for the character of Magee in the television special Prep & Landing.

== Filmography ==
Year	Title	Role	Notes
1988	Oliver & Company	production secretary	
1989	The Little Mermaid	assistant production manager: backgrounds	
1990	The Rescuers Down Under	assistant production manager	
1991	Beauty and the Beast	production administrator: Florida unit	
1994	The Lion King	assistant production manager: animation pre-production manager	
1995	Pocahontas	assistant production manager: communications	
1996	The Hunchback of Notre Dame	manager of communications	
1999	Tarzan	director of production	
2007	Meet the Robinsons	producer	
2010	Tick Tock Tale	producer	Short film
2010	Prep & Landing: Operation: Secret Santa	producer	Short film
2011	The Ballad of Nessie	producer	Short film
2012	Wreck-It Ralph	studio leadership	Walt Disney Animation Studios
2013	Frozen	studio leadership	Walt Disney Animation Studios
2013	Get a Horse!	producer	Short film
2014	Big Hero 6	studio leadership	Walt Disney Animation Studios
2016	Zootopia	studio leadership	Walt Disney Animation Studios
2016	Moana	studio leadership	Walt Disney Animation Studios
2018	Ralph Breaks the Internet	studio leadership	Walt Disney Animation Studios
2019	Frozen II	studio leadership	Walt Disney Animation Studios
2022	Oswald the Lucky Rabbit	producer	Short film
2024	D.I.Y. Duck	producer	Short film

=== Television ===
Year	Title	Role	Notes
2009	Prep & Landing	producer	Television special
2011	Prep & Landing: Naughty vs. Nice	producer	Television special
2021	How to Stay at Home	producer	
