= Wilbert Plijnaar =

Dutch cartoonist and comics artist

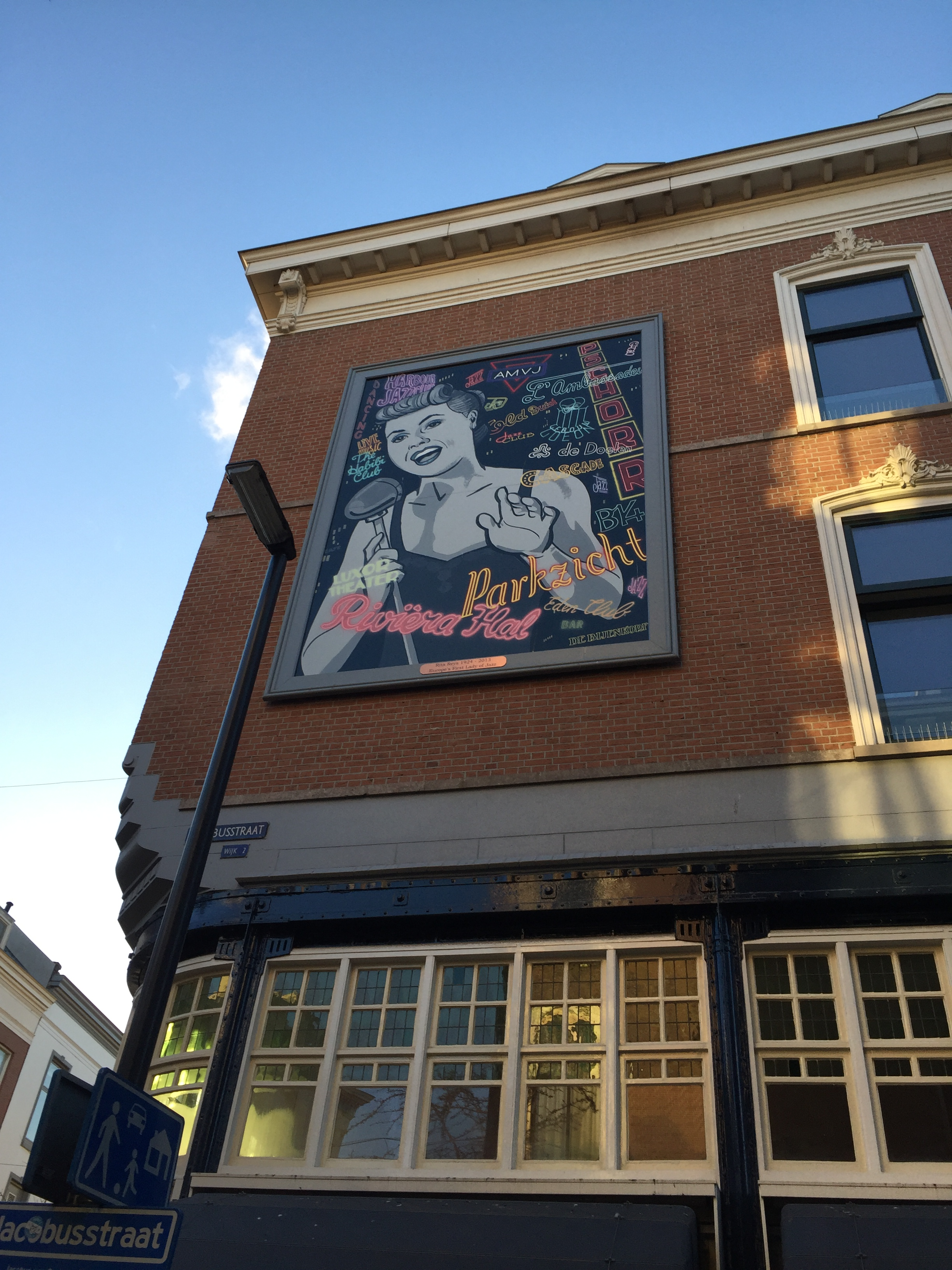
Rita Reys (Rotterdam) by Wilbert Plijnaar

Wilbert Plijnaar (born 12 February 1954, Rotterdam) is a Dutch comics artist. He is the winner of the 1995 Stripschapprijs.

== Biography ==
Plijnaar started his career working for Donald Duck in 1972. In the mid 1970s, he moved to the magazine Eppo, where he and Jan van Die started writing scripts for Sjors en Sjimmie and modernized the strip. The other comic he is known for is Claire, published exclusively in the women's magazine Flair.

In 1985, Wilbert Plijnaar bumps into Hans Buying of the Comic House Agency. The meeting ignites a close and productive collaboration that lasts for over ten years. During this period, Plijnaar is moving from Rotterdam to Amsterdam. There, both artists are working together on dozens of animation productions per year, rapidly making Comic House one of the largest animation producers in the Netherlands.

In 1995, he moved to Hollywood to work as a story artist. He has contributed to animated features such as Quest for Camelot, Osmosis Jones, Ice Age, Jimmy Neutron Boy Genius, Shrek 2, and Over the Hedge.

In 2019, Plijnaar released his biography Rotterdammer in Hollywood.

== Personal life ==
He is the nephew of jazz singer Rita Reys. A portrait of her by his design is placed in the Oude Binnenweg of Rotterdam.

== Filmography ==
Year	Title	Role
1998	Quest for Camelot	storyboard artist
2001	Osmosis Jones	storyboard artist/visual development artist
2001	Jimmy Neutron: Boy Genius	storyboard artist
2002	Ice Age	storyboard artist
2006	Ice Age: The Meltdown	additional story artist
2006	Over the Hedge	storyboard artist
2008	Horton Hears a Who!	additional story artist
2009	Ice Age: Dawn of the Dinosaurs	additional story artist
2009	Planet 51	storyboard artist
2009	How to Hook Up Your Home Theater	Writer/ story artist
2010	The Princess and the Frog	story artist
2010	How to Train Your Dragon	concept artist
2010	Despicable Me	additional story artist
2011	Gnomeo & Juliet	storyboard artist
2011	The Ballad of Nessie	storyboard artist
2012	The Lorax	story artist
2013	Despicable Me 2	story artist
2015	Minions	story artist
2016	The Secret Life of Pets	story artist
2018	The Grinch	story artist
2021	Space Jam: A New Legacy	storyboard artist
