= The Ballad of Nessie =

The Ballad Of Nessie
- Poster for The Ballad of Nessie
- Directed by: Stevie Wermers-Skelton; Kevin Deters
- Written by: Regina Conroy; Stevie Wermers-Skelton; Kevin Deters
- Story by: Burny Mattinson; Wilbert Plijnaar; Josie Trinidad
- Produced by: Dorothy McKim; Tamara Boutcher
- Narrated by: Billy Connolly
- Edited by: Jeff Draheim
- Music by: Michael Giacchino
- Production company: Walt Disney Animation Studios
- Distributed by: Walt Disney Studios; Motion Pictures
- Release dates: March 5, 2011 (Belgium); July 15, 2011 (U.S., with Winnie The Pooh)
- Running time: 6 minutes
- Language: English

The Ballad of Nessie is a 2011 animated short film produced by Walt Disney Animation Studios. It was directed by Stevie Wermers-Skelton and Kevin Deters, and produced by the team behind Disney's 2007 animated short film How to Hook Up Your Home Theater.

The short, narrated by Billy Connolly, is a Disney adaptation of the origin of the Loch Ness Monster, Nessie, described to be a female amphibious lizard-like monster.

== Plot ==
A young gentle creature named Nessie lives happily in a small pond with her best friend MacQuack, a rubber duck. When rich developer MacFroogal, based on Donald Trump, destroys the pond and land surrounding it to build a giant miniature golf course, Nessie is forced to search for a new home. She finds rejection everywhere and is always ordered to keep a stiff upper lip whenever she feels like crying. Finally, Nessie loses all hope and starts crying for weeks on end. She cannot cry anymore when she finds that her tears have created Loch Ness, a new home for her and MacQuack.

A mid-credits scene reveals that MacFroogal's golf course is flooded out as well. MacFroogal breaks down in tears as he and his assistants sail away on part of a large sign, while the water knocks off some of the letters on the remaining part, leaving the word "MacFool" behind.

== Release ==
The short premiered on March 5, 2011, at Anima 2011, the International Animation Film Festival of Brussel. In the United States, it accompanied the theatrical release of Winnie the Pooh, which premiered on July 15 of the same year.

== Home media ==
The short was released on October 25, 2011, as a bonus feature on the Blu-ray, DVD, and digital download release of Winnie the Pooh. The Ballad of Nessie was released on the Walt Disney Animation Studios Short Films Collection Blu-ray on August 18, 2015. It is also available to watch separately on Disney+.

== Accolades ==
The Ballad of Nessie was nominated for a 2012 Annie Award for Best Animated Short Subject.
