= After the Reality =

- Directed by: David Anderson
- Screenplay by: David Anderson
- Produced by: David Anderson; John Hermann; Alexander Kruener
- Starring: Matthew Morrison; Sarah Chalke
- Cinematography: Dominique Martinez
- Edited by: Jordan Harris
- Music by: Doran Danoff
- Production company: USofAnderson I
- Distributed by: The Orchard
- Release dates: April 21, 2016 (Newport Beach International Film Festival); April 25, 2017 (United States)
- Running time: 85 minutes
- Country: United States
- Language: English

After the Reality is a 2016 American romance film written and directed by David Anderson and starring Matthew Morrison and Sarah Chalke. It was released by The Orchard.

== Premise ==
A contestant (Matthew Morrison) on a Bachelorette style reality show is thrown into turmoil when the sudden death of his father forces him to quit the series prematurely and reconnect with his estranged sister (Sarah Chalke) at their family cabin.

== Cast ==
- Matthew Morrison as Scottie
- Sarah Chalke as Kate
- Jon Dore as Fitz
- Laura Bell Bundy as Kelly
- Juan Pablo Di Pace as Dunkin
- Isaiah Mustafa as Garreth
- Tony Cavalero as Reg
- Aimee Garcia as Crystal
- Jane Lynch as Doctor
- John Heard as Bob
- Michael Fairman as Elmer Severson
- Katy Jacoby as Producer
- Max Gecowets as Rucke
