= The True Meaning of Christmas Specials =

The True Meaning of Christmas Specials is a Canadian television Christmas special, hosted by Dave Foley. It was first broadcast on CBC Television on December 22, 2002.

== Synopsis ==
Dave Foley has reached a milestone in his career, He is hosting his first Christmas special, live from the beach, featuring surf-guitar legend, Dick Dale. The special seems to be going well, but as Dave begins to try to sell kitchen gadgets to the television audience, he senses there is something wrong with his Special; but can't place his finger on it. After some deliberation, he decides to move the beach party north to Canada, depicted as a snow-covered cabin, which strangely appears to be located only fifty feet from the beach.

Upon arriving, Dave teams up with El Vez ("The Mexican Elvis"), Elvis Stojko, Bing Crosby, Thomas the Butler, Santa Dude, Mike Myers, and "The Ghosts of Christmas Specials Past, Present, and Yet to Come".

He consults a priest and many of his new friends, but cannot gain passion for his Christmas special.

Eventually, Dave dreams about "Christmas Specials Yet to Come", which is a future reminiscent of Soylent Green, only with Christmas specials. He wakes with a start when he discovers that in the future, there are people-flavored chips, and that the people chips are made from people. He resumes his Christmas special with added fervor, as El Vez and Dick Dale party the night away.

== Cast ==
(in credits order)

- Dave Foley as Himself/David Bowie
- Jann Arden as The Ghost of Christmas Specials Present
- Dick Dale as Himself
- Joe Flaherty as Bing Crosby
- Tom Green as Thomas, the butler
- Crissy Guerrero as El Vette
- Lisa Hockly as El Vette
- Paul Irving as Lodge Manager
- Robert 'El Vez' López as Himself
- Kevin McDonald as The Ghost of Christmas Specials Yet To Come
- Mike Myers as Himself
- Jason Priestley as Santa Dude
- Andy Richter as Priest
- Elvis Stojko as Himself
- Dave Thomas as The Ghost of Christmas Specials Past (Bob Hope)

== See also ==
- List of Christmas films
