= Derek Richardson (actor) =

American actor (born 1976)

- Born: January 18, 1976 (age 50); Queensbury, New York, U.S.
- Occupation: Actor
- Years active: 2000–present
- Spouse: Franka Potente (m. 2012)
- Children: 2

Derek Richardson Jr. (born January 18, 1976) is an American actor. He is best known for his TV roles on Men in Trees and Anger Management, and for starring as young Harry Dunne in the film Dumb and Dumberer: When Harry Met Lloyd.

== Early life ==
Richardson was born in Queensbury, New York, the eldest of the five children of Ellen and Dr. Derek Richardson, a dermatologist.

== Career ==
Richardson's first screen work was in New York in 2000, appearing in one episode each of Strangers with Candy and Law & Order.

He moved to Los Angeles in 2002, to pursue his career. His first role was that year, in a two episode run as Keri Russell's love interest of the week, late in the final season of Felicity. He subsequently co-starred in the prequel to the Dumb and Dumber franchise Dumb and Dumberer: When Harry Met Lloyd as a younger version of Jeff Daniels' character, Harry Dunne.

Richardson starred as one of the leads in the horror film Hostel, earning a 2006 MTV Movie Award nomination for "Best Frightened Performance". In 2006, he began starring as Patrick Bachelor in the series Men in Trees.

From 2012–14, he played Nolan Johnson on all 100 episodes of Anger Management and portrayed California Governor Ronald Reagan's speechwriter (and later congressman) Dana Rohrabacher in the 2024 biopic Reagan.

In 2025, he played Detective Dundee in the Season 3, Episode 3 of Tracker

== Filmography ==
Year	Title	Role	Notes
2000	Strangers with Candy	Jared	Episode: "Jerri's Burning Issue"
2000	Law & Order	Brad Wilder	Episode: "Black, White and Blue"
2002	Felicity	Adam Davis	2 episodes
2003	Dumb and Dumberer: When Harry Met Lloyd	Harry Dunne	Nominated – Golden Raspberry Award for Worst Screen Couple
2004	Bring It On Again	Party Guy	
2005	Hostel	Josh Brooks	Nominated – MTV Movie Award for Best Frightened Performance
2005	Reeker	Nelson	
2006	Men in Trees	Patrick Bachelor	Main cast
2007	Hostel: Part II	Josh Brooks	
2008	What Makes Alex Tick	Alex Young	Short film
2009	House	Steve Alkateen / Freedom Master	Episode "Broken"
2009	Prep & Landing	Lanny (voice)	Television special
2010	Prep & Landing: Operation: Secret Santa	Lanny (voice)	Television special
2011	Prep & Landing: Naughty vs. Nice	Lanny (voice)	Television special
2011	American Horror Story	Harry Goodman	Episode: "Smoldering Children"
2012	Psych	Danny Smith	Episode: "Shawn and the Real Girl"
2012–2014	Anger Management	Nolan Johnson	Main cast
2013	The Power of Few	Shane	
2016	Der Island-Krimi	Árni	
2017	Lethal Weapon	Jonah	Episode: "Fools Rush In"
2020	Home	Wade	
2021	Fear the Walking Dead	Fred	Episode: "Six Hours"
2021	A Million Little Things	Stephen	Episode: "The Things We Keep Inside"
2023	Welcome to Flatch	Lloyd	3 episodes
2024	Reagan	Dana Rohrabacher	
2024	High Potential	Eric Barton	Episode: "Hangover"
2025	Tracker	Detective Dundee	Episode: "First Fire"
2025	Prep & Landing: The Snowball Protocol	Lanny (voice)	Television special
2026	The Night Agent	Younger Jacob Monroe	Episode: "Once Upon a Time..."
