= Prep & Landing: Naughty vs. Nice =

2011 Disney animated Christmas special

- Genre: Animated television special
- Created by: The Walt Disney Company
- Based on: Prep & Landing by: Kevin Deters; Stevie Wermers-Skelton; Chris Williams
- Screenplay by: Kevin Deters; Stevie Wermers-Skelton
- Story by: Paul Briggs; Don Dougherty; Barry W. Johnson; Brian Kesinger; Michael LaBash; Joe Mateo
- Directed by: Kevin Deters; Stevie Wermers-Skelton
- Starring: Dave Foley; Derek Richardson; Sarah Chalke; Rob Riggle; Chris Parnell; W. Morgan Sheppard; Emily Alyn Lind; Hayes MacArthur; Phil LaMarr; Christopher Harrison; Grace Potter; Kevin Deters
- Music by: Michael Giacchino
- Country of origin: United States
- Original language: English

Production
- Producer: Dorothy McKim
- Editor: Jeff Draheim
- Running time: 22 minutes
- Production companies: Walt Disney Animation Studios; Walt Disney Pictures

Original release
- Network: ABC
- Release: December 5, 2011

Prep & Landing: Naughty vs. Nice is an American animated television special, produced by Walt Disney Animation Studios, and directed by Kevin Deters and Stevie Wermers-Skelton. It aired on December 5, 2011, on the ABC TV channel. The special is the second 22-minute Christmas special, and the fourth short film in the Prep & Landing series, after Prep & Landing, Tiny's Big Adventure, and Operation: Secret Santa. Another 22-minute special, Prep & Landing: The Snowball Protocol, was released on November 27, 2025 (Thanksgiving night) on Disney Channel, the first of the series to debut via that channel.

== Plot ==
The beginning of the special introduces the Coal Elf Brigade, a special unit of Christmas elves responsible for delivering lumps of coal to naughty children. While seeming cruel to some, the brigade adds small, encouraging notes in an attempt to steer the children back to the nice list.

With Christmas Day approaching, Wayne and Lanny race to recover classified North Pole technology that has fallen into the hands of a hacker identified only as "jinglesmell1337". Desperate to prevent Christmas from descending into chaos, Wayne is assigned his younger brother Noel, an expert in naughty children and member of the Coal Elf Brigade. Reluctant to take Noel along with him, Wayne relents, and Noel joins the Prep & Landing team on the mission. During the trip, Noel and Wayne reminisce about their childhood, when they worked together far better than they do now. As the trio arrives at the hacker's house, Wayne sets off a booby trap, imperiling the entire team; Noel manages to defend himself, Wayne takes a particular beating from the trap's various mechanisms, and Lanny makes it into the hacker's room, only to be captured.

The hacker then reveals herself to be a child named Grace Goodwin. Her mission is to get herself off the naughty list, believing that she had been set up by her toddler brother, Gabriel, who had destroyed her favorite toy and ruined her chances to ask Santa for a new one by his crying. After Lanny suggests using the "magic word" to get the password for the device that will get her off the list, she does just that: using the word "please" as the password. At first, she appears successful in changing her status. Meanwhile, Wayne is particularly bitter at being "shown up" by his younger brother, prompting a fight in the street in front of Grace's house. Noel throws what he had intended to give Wayne as a Christmas present at him: a toy sled that Wayne had wanted as a kid but was never able to get. This prompts Wayne to reconcile with Noel and carry out the mission. Grace, watching the whole argument as it unfolds, learns a powerful lesson and a newfound appreciation for her younger brother.

Wayne then receives a call from Magee who tells him that the device is causing bigger problems by transferring every child to the naughty list, and Mr. Thistleton, the North Pole's head of IT, can't access the device to fix it. Wayne tells them that the antenna is broken. Mr. Thistleton tells him to fix it by attaching it to a powerful antenna to reverse the damage. Grace assists the elves and apologizes for being naughty. Noel and Wayne climb to the top of the building, and realize that they cannot go near the antenna due to electric hazards, so they work together to launch the calculator to it, restoring the connection and reversing the damage, saving Christmas.

The next morning, Gabriel gives Grace her new Christmas present; a replacement toy for the one he had destroyed a year prior. Meanwhile, back at the North Pole, Wayne and Noel both win the title of "Elves of the Year" for their efforts and cooperation.

== Cast ==
- Dave Foley as Wayne, a Prep & Landing elf.
- Derek Richardson as Lanny, a Prep & Landing elf and Wayne's partner.
- Sarah Chalke as Magee, the North Pole Christmas Eve Command Center Coordinator (NPCECCC) for Santa's flight.
- Rob Riggle as Noel, a Coal Elf and Wayne's younger brother.
- Chris Parnell as Mr. Thistleton, the North Pole's head of IT who has a crush on Magee.
- W. Morgan Sheppard as 'The Big Guy'/Santa Claus, who delivers toys to children.
- Emily Alyn Lind as Grace Goodwin, a little girl who wants to get off the naughty list.
- Hayes MacArthur as Thrasher, a reindeer who serves as transport for the elves.
- Phil LaMarr as Crumbles, an elderly Coal Elf who mispronounces Wayne's name as Dwayne.
- Christopher Harrison as Gene, the salesman who gives Wayne's car to Noel.
- Grace Potter as Carol, the bartender for the Coal Elves.
- Kevin Deters as Hop With Me Bunny, Grace's stuffed bunny who fights the elves.

== Release ==
The special was released on DVD and Blu-ray of Prep & Landing: Totally Tinsel Collection on November 6, 2012, together with Prep & Landing, Operation: Secret Santa, and Tiny's Big Adventure. The 3D version of the special was screened at the Muppet*Vision 3D theatre at Disney California Adventure in Anaheim, CA.

== Awards ==
On December 5, 2011, on the day of its first broadcast, Prep & Landing: Naughty vs. Nice was nominated for eleven Annie Awards in seven categories by the International Animated Film Association, ASIFA-Hollywood. It tied Rango for the most awards with four, winning for character animation, character design, music and storyboarding in a broadcast production at its 39th annual ceremony.

Result	Award	Winner/Nominee Recipient(s)
Nominated	Best General Audience Animated TV Production	Walt Disney Animation Studios
Nominated	Character Animation in a Television Production	Chad Sellers
Nominated	Character Animation in a Television Production	Rebecca Wilson Bresee
Won	Character Animation in a Television Production	Tony Smeed
Won	Character Design in a Television Production	Bill Schwab
Nominated	Directing in a Television Production	Kevin Deters, Stevie Wermers-Skelton
Won	Music in a Television Production	Grace Potter, Michael Giacchino
Nominated	Storyboarding in a Television Production	Barry W. Johnson
Won	Storyboarding in a Television Production	Brian Kesinger
Nominated	Storyboarding in a Television Production	Joe Mateo
Nominated	Writing in a Television Production	Kevin Deters, Stevie Wermers-Skelton
