= Stevie Wermers =

American screenwriter

Stevie Wermers-Skelton
- Born: Stephanie Robin Wermers; January 28, 1966 (age 60); Ventura County, California, U.S.
- Education: California Institute of the Arts
- Occupations: Film director, writer, story artist
- Years active: 1995−present
- Employer: Walt Disney Animation Studios
- Notable work: Prep & Landing, Olaf's Frozen Adventure

Stevie Wermers-Skelton (born January 28, 1966) is an American story artist and director. Together with Kevin Deters, she co-directed the traditionally animated shorts How to Hook Up Your Home Theater (2007) and The Ballad of Nessie (2011), and the animated television specials Prep & Landing (2009), Prep & Landing: Operation: Secret Santa (2010), and Prep & Landing: Naughty vs. Nice (2011) for ABC. In 2011, it was reported that Wermers-Skelton is preparing a new Prep & Landing holiday special.

In February 2016, it was announced that she and Deters would co-direct a Frozen holiday special, which was scheduled to air in 2017 on ABC. In June 2017 it was announced that the short, titled Olaf's Frozen Adventure, would instead receive a limited time theatrical release. It was released in theaters with Disney·Pixar's Coco on November 22, 2017, and made its television debut on ABC on December 14, 2017.

How to Hook Up Your Home Theater is the first Walt Disney Animation Studios release to have a female director credit. The Prep & Landing series garnered several Annie and Emmy awards.

Wermers-Skelton is a member of the Academy of Television Arts & Sciences and the Academy of Motion Picture Arts and Sciences.

== Filmography ==
- Pocahontas (1995) (in between artist: Grandmother Willow)
- Tarzan (1999) (story)
- Fantasia 2000 (1999) (story artist, story development: Pomp and Circumstance)
- The Emperor's New Groove (2000) (story artist)
- Brother Bear (2003) (story)
- How to Hook Up Your Home Theater (2007) (story, co-director)
- Prep & Landing (2009) (co-director and co-writer, voice of "Rev-Up Elf")
- The Princess and the Frog (2009) (visual development artist)
- Prep & Landing: Operation: Secret Santa (2010) (co-director and co-writer)
- The Ballad of Nessie (2011) (director and writer)
- Prep & Landing: Naughty vs. Nice (2011) (co-director and co-writer)
- Zootopia (2016) (additional story artist)
- Olaf's Frozen Adventure (2017) (director, additional voices)
- Monsters at Work (2021) (supervising director) (voice director) (season 2)
- Alice's Wonderland Bakery (2022) (director and storyboard artist)
- Prep & Landing: The Snowball Protocol (2025) (executive producer)
