= Prep & Landing =

2009 television film

- Genre: Animated television special
- Screenplay by: Kevin Deters; Stevie Wermers-Skelton
- Story by: Chris Williams
- Directed by: Kevin Deters; Stevie Wermers-Skelton
- Starring: Dave Foley; Derek Richardson; Sarah Chalke
- Music by: Michael Giacchino
- Country of origin: United States
- Original language: English

Production
- Producer: Dorothy McKim
- Cinematography: Rob Dressel
- Editor: William J. Caparella
- Running time: 22 minutes
- Production companies: Walt Disney Animation Studios; Walt Disney Pictures
- Budget: $14 million

Original release
- Network: ABC
- Release: December 8, 2009

Prep & Landing is an American animated television special, based on an idea by Chris Williams at Walt Disney Animation Studios and developed by Kevin Deters and Stevie Wermers-Skelton into a half-hour Christmas special. The first installment in the Prep & Landing series, it first aired on December 8, 2009, on ABC.

The special was released online the next day, along with an original one-minute short film Tiny's Big Adventure. An 8-minute short, Prep & Landing: Operation: Secret Santa, aired on December 7, 2010, reprising the original cast with the addition of Betty White as Mrs. Claus. The next half-hour Christmas TV special, Prep & Landing: Naughty vs. Nice aired on December 5, 2011, on ABC. A third half-hour special, produced at Disney Television Animation, Prep & Landing: The Snowball Protocol was released on November 27, 2025 (Thanksgiving night) on Disney Channel, the first of the series to debut via that channel, followed by Disney+ on the next day and was rerun on Freeform as part of the 25 Days of Christmas, as well as an additional airing on ABC.

== Plot ==
Wayne, a Christmas elf, is part of an elite organization known as "Prep & Landing", whose job is to ready millions of homes around the world for Santa Claus's visit. After working with "Prep & Landing" for 227 years, Wayne looks forward to getting promoted to director of the naughty list. Instead, his former partner and trainee, Peterson, gets the promotion. Wayne is introduced to Lanny, a freshly graduated rookie, whom Wayne has to also train.

Wayne is still bitter about the promotion, and decides to slack off during a mission. He permits Lanny to do all of the work, which is disastrous. Meanwhile, Santa is informed mid-flight of a massive snow storm and that Wayne and Lanny have not fully prepared the house yet. He is told to cancel the landing, which has never happened before; they promise to make it up for Timmy, a boy living at the house. Wayne and Lanny discover that the re-routing was a final decision, but after hearing Timmy thank them in his sleep, Wayne decides to fix it. He calls up Santa, telling him that he must land at Timmy's house. Wayne and Lanny then work together to land Santa safely on Timmy's roof. On Christmas morning, Santa shows Wayne that Timmy had a merry Christmas. Santa offers a promotion to Wayne as the director of the nice list, but he turns it down so he can work with Lanny.

== Cast ==
- Dave Foley as Wayne, the main character. He worked in "Prep & Landing" for years and looked forward to being promoted to Director of Naughty List Intelligence, but he was stuck with Lanny to train as his partner. His call sign is "Little Drummer Boy".
- Derek Richardson as Lanny, an overly enthusiastic "Prep & Landing" rookie, who was given by Magee to Wayne to train. He looks up to Wayne, being his biggest fan. His call sign is "Tree Skirt" and his catchphrase is "This is soo tinsel!"
- Sarah Chalke as Magee, the North Pole Christmas Eve Command Center Coordinator (NPCECCC) for Santa's flight. She was promoted to her current position from Toy Design after not listening to her friend Jerry and taking the job (something she admittedly regrets). Her call sign is "Jingle Belle".
- W. Morgan Sheppard as 'The Big Guy' Santa Claus. His call sign is "Partridge". "Pear Tree" is his sleigh (in flight).
- Mason Vale Cotton as Timmy Terwelp, an excited young boy who befriends Wayne before he is put back to bed only seconds later.
- Nathan Greno and David DeLuise as Dasher and Dancer (respectively), Santa's lead reindeer. Their call sign, along with the other six reindeer is "Eight Maids 'a Milking", something Dasher hates.
- Hayes MacArthur as Thrasher, Dasher's aggressive cousin and Reindeer for "Prep & Landing". Thrasher's P&L transport was the last one out before Santa's flight, making it imperative that Wayne and Lanny get on board. According to Lanny, Thrasher is a myth to those outside P&L.
- Tiny is Magee's assistant in the command center. He has his own short film on-line, "Tiny's Big Adventure", which takes place during the show.
- Peter Jacobson as Waterkotte
- Kasha Kropinski as Miss Holly, Santa's Executive Assistant.
- Lino DiSalvo as Gristletoe Joe

== Production ==
Prep and Landing was originally pitched by director Chris Williams as a short film for the newly re-opened shorts program at Walt Disney Animation Studios. Liking the idea, John Lasseter (Chief Creative Officer of Disney Animation) considered it to work best as a television special. ABC executives, keen to repeat the success of the 2007 DreamWorks Animation special Shrek the Halls, approved the project.

Following Williams' directorial debut on the short film Glago's Guest, he was moved on to co-direct the feature film Bolt. The special continued production under directors Kevin Deters and Stevie Wermers-Skelton's (Goofy's How to Hook Up Your Home Theater) control.

== Release ==
The original premiere date was scheduled for December 1, but a speech at the United States Military Academy in West Point, New York by President Barack Obama delayed the special's debut one week to December 8, 2009.

The special was released on DVD on November 22, 2011, along with the short films Tiny's BIG Adventure and Operation: Secret Santa. It was also released on DVD and Blu-ray of Prep & Landing: Totally Tinsel Collection on November 6, 2012, together with Operation: Secret Santa, Naughty vs. Nice, and Tiny's BIG Adventure.

== Ratings ==
Airing #	Air Date	Rating	Share	Rating/Share (18-49)	Viewers (millions)	Rank (timeslot)	Rank (night)	Rank (week)
1	December 8, 2009	5.8	9	4.1	12.042	1	1	13^{T}
2	December 16, 2009	6.8						33^{T}
3	December 24, 2009	3.3						68^{T}

^{T} - Tied for that slot in that week.

== Awards ==
On December 1, 2009, prior to its first broadcast, Prep & Landing was nominated for nine Annie Awards in seven categories by the International Animated Film Association, ASIFA-Hollywood. It won three awards, including the award for Best Animated Television Production.

On February 10, 2010, Prep & Landing was nominated for two awards at the 8th Visual Effects Society Awards, winning in the Outstanding Visual Effects in a Broadcast Miniseries, Movie or Special category and losing in the Outstanding Animated Character in a Broadcast Program or Commercial category.

On August 21, 2010, Prep & Landing was honored with four Emmy Awards including the Outstanding Animated Program (for Programming Less Than One Hour) category.

Award	Recipient(s)	Result
Best Animated Television Production	ABC and Walt Disney Animation Studios	Won
Character Animation in a Television Production	Mark Mitchell	Nominated
Character Animation in a Television Production	Tony Smeed	Nominated
Character Design in a Television Production	Bill Schwab	Won
Music in a Television Production	Michael Giacchino	Nominated
Production Design in a Television Production	Mac George	Nominated
Production Design in a Television Production	Andy Harkness	Won
Storyboarding in a Television Production	Joe Mateo	Nominated
Writing in a Television Production	Kevin Deters, Stevie Wermers-Skelton	Nominated

== Comic ==
An 8-page comic story, titled Prep & Landing: Mansion Impossible, was released on November 16, 2011, in Avengers #19, Marvel Adventures Super Heroes #20, and Marvel Adventures Spider-Man #20. The comic tells a story of Wayne and Lanny preparing Avengers Mansion for a visit from Santa. It was written by Kevin Deters, and illustrated by Joe Mateo.

== See also ==
- List of Christmas films
- List of Disney animated shorts and featurettes
- Santa Claus in film
- Walt Disney Animation Studios

== Bibliography ==
- Hill, Jim (September 16, 2009). "Disney's "Prep & Landing" wows animation fans at the D23 EXPO". Jim Hill Media.
