= W. Morgan Sheppard =

British actor (1932–2019)

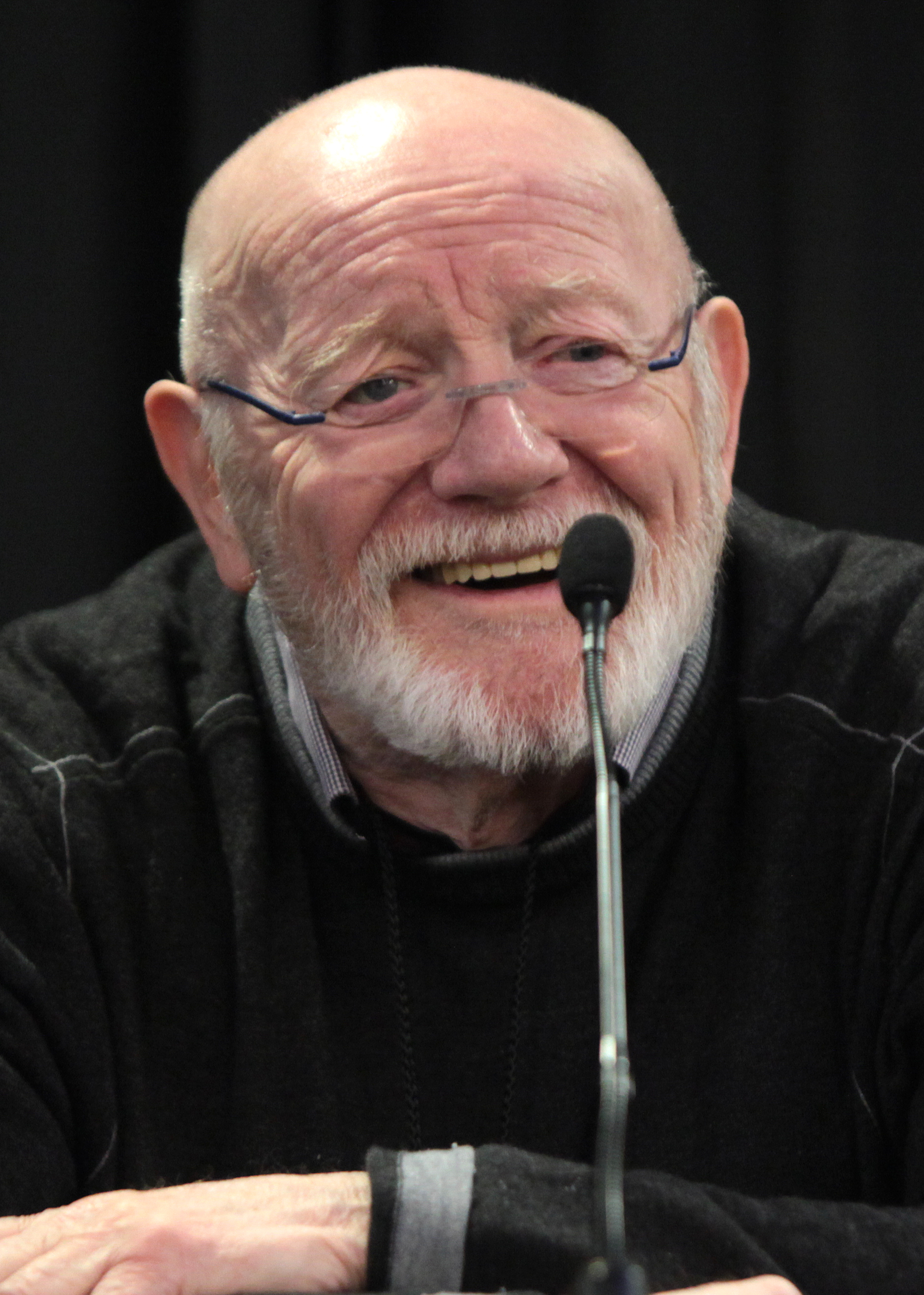
- Sheppard in 2015
- Born: William Morgan Sheppard; 24 August 1932; London, England
- Died: 6 January 2019 (aged 86); Los Angeles, California, U.S.
- Other name: Morgan Sheppard
- Education: Royal Academy of Dramatic Art
- Occupation: Actor
- Years active: 1961–2017
- Spouse: Regina Lisa Scherer (m. 1963)
- Children: Mark Sheppard

William Morgan Sheppard (24 August 1932 – 6 January 2019), also credited by his full name or as Morgan Sheppard, was an English actor who appeared in over 100 films and television programmes, as well as several video games, in a career that spanned over 50 years.

== Early life and education ==
William Morgan Sheppard was born on 24 August 1932.

He served in the British Merchant Navy during the Korean War (1950-1953).

Sheppard graduated from the Royal Academy of Dramatic Art (RADA) in London in 1958.

== Career ==
=== Stage ===
After graduating from RADA, Sheppard spent 12 years as an associate artist with the Royal Shakespeare Company.

He appeared on Broadway in Marat/Sade (1966) and in Sherlock Holmes (1975).

In 1995 he won the Los Angeles Drama Critics Circle Award for The Homecoming.

=== Screen ===
Sheppard appeared in several episodes of different series of Star Trek, notably The Next Generation's "The Schizoid Man" and Voyager's "Bliss". In the feature film Star Trek VI: The Undiscovered Country, his role was the warden of a Klingon gulag and in the 2009 reboot Star Trek, he played a member of the Vulcan High Council, but was uncredited. Outside of Star Trek, he is best known for his role as Blank Reg on Max Headroom and his role as the Confederate general Isaac R. Trimble in the films Gettysburg and Gods and Generals.

Sheppard appeared in two roles on the science-fiction series Babylon 5, in the episode titled "Soul Hunter", playing the eponymous character and also played Narn war leader G'Sten, an uncle of main character G'Kar, in "The Long Twilight Struggle". He was also a runner-up for the role of Ambassador G'Kar on the series, though the role eventually went to Andreas Katsulas.

Sheppard was one of several Star Trek actors who voiced characters on the animated series Gargoyles, wherein he played the father of Jonathan Frakes' character David Xanatos and the Norse god Odin.

Sheppard and his son, Mark Sheppard, acted together in a few productions. Sheppard appeared in the television series NCIS, in the season six episode "Broken Bird", where he played the older version of a man named Marcin Jerek, while his son played the younger version. He appeared in the opening episode of series six of Doctor Who, "The Impossible Astronaut", playing the character Canton Everett Delaware III. He portrayed an older version of Delaware, while his son portrayed the younger version in the same episode. He and his son are among the few actors who have appeared in both the Star Trek and Doctor Who franchises.

In December 2009, Sheppard voiced the part of Santa in Disney's Christmas special Prep & Landing. Following that, he returned as the voice of Santa in the sequels, Prep & Landing: Operation: Secret Santa and Prep & Landing: Naughty vs. Nice. On 4 December 2010, Sheppard appeared on Hallmark Channel Original Films Farewell Mr. Kringle as Kris Kringle.

=== Video games ===
Sheppard voiced several characters in video games.

He narrated the introductions and mission briefings for the first four instalments of the Medal of Honor video game series. He was cast in the 1996 adventure game Zork Nemesis, playing the live-action role of Bishop Francois Malveaux, one of the four alchemists central to the plot of the game.

In 2000, he voiced the character Ignatius Cheese in the game Escape from Monkey Island. Sheppard voiced over for the character John Adams in the Wii game The Conduit. He provided the voice for the character Lucky in the 2002 Xbox game Whacked!.

Sheppard was the narrator for the video game Civilization V and its expansions, providing the voice overs for the intro movies, victory and defeat screens, loading screens, wonders, Great Works, and newly researched technologies.

== Personal life ==
Sheppard and his wife Regina are the parents of actor Mark Sheppard. He died on 6 January 2019 in Los Angeles, California, at the age of 86.

== Filmography ==
=== Film ===
Year	Title	Role	Notes
1962	Strongroom	Alec	
1967	Marat/Sade	A Mad Animal	
1968	Tell Me Lies	Guest	
1973	The Roses of Eyam	William Hancock	Television film
1974	Antony and Cleopatra	Scarus	Television film
1977	The Duellists	The Fencing Master	
1977	Rachel and the Beelzebub Bombardiers	Salvationist	
1978	The Nativity	Flavius	Television film
1980	The Sea Wolves	'Patch' Lovecroft	
1980	The Elephant Man	Man In Pub	
1980	Hawk the Slayer	Ranulf	
1983	Nutcracker	George Peacock	
1983	The Keep	Alexandru	
1984	Lassiter	Sweeny	
1984	Camille	Captain	Television film
1984	The Zany Adventures of Robin Hood	Saxon thief	Television film
1985	The Dirty Dozen: Next Mission	German General	Television film
1985	Max Headroom: 20 Minutes into the Future	Blank Reg	Television film
1985	AD	Gracchus	TV Mini-Series
1985	The Doctor and the Devils	Landlord	
1986	Lady Jane	Executioner	
1987	Cry Freedom	Policeman	
1987	Gunsmoke: Return to Dodge	Digger McCloud	Television film
1988	Elvira: Mistress of the Dark	Vincent Talbot	
1988	Lucky Stiff	Pa	
1990	Wild at Heart	Mr. Reindeer	
1991	Star Trek VI: The Undiscovered Country	Klingon Prison Warden	
1992	There Goes the Neighbourhood	Trick Bissell	
1993	Needful Things	Father Meehan	
1993	Gettysburg	Maj. Gen. Isaac R. Trimble / Narrator	
1993	Taking Liberty		
1994	Following Her Heart	Anders Lundquist	Television film
1996	The Lottery	Mayor Warner	Television film
1997	Nether World	Old Timer	
1998	Goldrush: A Real Life Alaskan Adventure	Whiskers	Television film
1998	Pocahontas II: Journey to a New World	Captain	Voice, direct-to-video
1998	The Escape	Long	Television film
1998	Hurricane Festival	Charles	
1999	Treasure of Pirate's Point	Charles Vane / Captain	
1999	The Hungry Bachelors Club	Mr. Ringold	
2001	Room 101	Landers	
2003	Gods and Generals	Maj. Gen. Isaac Trimble	
2003	Atlantis: Milo's Return	Erik Hellstrom	Voice, direct-to-video
2003	Small Town Conspiracy	Taylor	
2003	Murder, She Wrote: The Celtic Riddle	Denny	Television film
2005	Love's Long Journey	Scottie	Television film
2006	Love's Abiding Joy	Scottie	
2006	The Prestige	Merrit	
2007	A Stranger's Heart	Fred Landreth	Television film
2007	Transformers	Captain Archibald Witwicky	
2007	Along the Way	Mr. Hereck	
2008	Over Her Dead Body	Father Marks	
2008	So Long Jimmy	Poppy Garfield	
2008	Japan		Voice
2009	Star Trek	Vulcan Science Minister	Uncredited
2009	Prep & Landing	Santa Claus	Voice, television film
2010	Mysterious Island	Captain Nemo	
2010	For Christ's Sake	Father Monahan	
2010	Prep & Landing: Operation: Secret Santa	Santa Claus	Voice, television film
2011	Meeting Spencer	Larry Lind	Voice, television film
2011	Prep & Landing: Naughty vs. Nice	Santa Claus	
2012	The Last Mark	Uncle Bill	
2012	The Guy...Who Was in That Thing	Self	
2013	The Devil's Dozen		
2013	April Apocalypse	Pops	
2013	Free Birds		Voice
2016	Last Man Club	Will Hodges	Final film role

=== Television ===
Year	Title	Role	Notes
1961	Theatre Night	Arthur Broadbent	Episode: "Celebration"; credited as Morgan Sheppard
1962	Z-Cars	Ron Probert	Episode: "The Five Whistles"; credited as Morgan Sheppard
1971	The Expert	Landlord	Episode: "Smithereens"
1973	The Roses of Eyam	William Hancock	Television film; credited as Morgan Sheppard
1973	The Up and Down, In and Out, Round About Man	Currently Unknown	Episode: "The Winner"; credited as Morgan Sheppard
1974	Crown Court	Dr. Martin Huntersmith	Episode: "Nuts"
1974	New Scotland Yard	Harry Haines	Episode: "All That Glitters"
1974	Dial M for Murder	Usher	Episode: "The Man in the Middle"; credited as Morgan Sheppard
1974	Antony and Cleopatra	Scarus	Television film; credited as Morgan Sheppard
1974	Marked Personal	Hearst	2 episodes
1975	Churchill's People	Sabinianus	Episode: "The Lost Island"; credited as Morgan Sheppard
1975	The Sweeney	Det. Chief Insp. Morrison	Episode: "Jackpot"; credited as Morgan Sheppard
1976	The Life and Death of Penelope	Foreman	Episode: "The Watcher"; credited as Morgan Sheppard
1976	Z-Cars	Joe Burnham	Episode: "Contact"; credited as Morgan Sheppard
1976	The New Avengers	Walters	Episode: "Gnaws"; credited as Morgan Sheppard
1977	Target	Barman	Episode: "Hunting Parties"
1977	London Belongs to Me	Henry Knockell	6 episodes
1977	When the Boat Comes In	Dixon	3 episodes
1977	The Onedin Line	Ned Harris	Episode: "Coffin Ships"
1978	Enemy at the Door	Raymond Girard	Episode: "By Order of the Fuhrer"; credited as Morgan Sheppard
1978	The Cedar Tree	Police Constable	Episode: "Home & Abroad"; credited as Morgan Sheppard
1978	Out	Mr. Smith	Episode: "The Moment He Opened His Envelope"; credited as Morgan Sheppard
1979	The Onedin Line	Sampson	Episode: "To Honour and Obey"
1979	Rebecca	Ben	2 episodes
1979	The Legend of King Arthur	Gorlois	Episode 1
1979	Minder	John	Episode: "Come in T-64, Your Time Is Ticking Away"
1979	Sherlock Holmes and Doctor Watson	Man in the Morgue / Mischkin	2 episodes
1980	Shōgun	Specz	5 episodes
1981	Masada	Roman Sergeant	Episode 1
1981	The Day of the Triffids	Bill Masen's father	Episode 1
1981	The Flame Trees of Thika	Piet Roos	3 episodes
1987–1988	Max Headroom	Blank Reg	7 episodes
1987–1989	Crossbow	Otto / Parker	2 episodes
1989	Star Trek: The Next Generation	Dr. Ira Graves	Episode: "The Schizoid Man"
1989–1990	MacGyver	Dr. Zito	2 episodes
1991	Designing Women	Professor Burton	Episode: "Tales Out of School"
1992–1993	The Legend of Prince Valiant	Sailor / Douglas / Man	Voice, 4 episodes
1993–1996	Biker Mice from Mars	Lawrence Lactavius Limburger	Voice, 65 episodes
1993	Quantum Leap	Gooshie, the Miner	Episode: "Mirror Image"
1993–1994	seaQuest DSV	The Old Man, Professor Martinson	7 episodes
1994–1995	Babylon 5	Warleader G'Sten / The Soul Hunter	2 episodes
1994–1996	Iron Man	Dum Dum Dugan	Voice
1995	Frasier	Mr. Drake	Episode: "The Club"
1995	Murder, She Wrote	Dr. Fredrick Grundberg	Episode: "Twice Dead"
1995–1996	Gargoyles	Petros Xanatos, Odin, King Kenneth, Radar, Security Guard	Voice, 7 episodes
1996	American Gothic	Mr. Emmett	Episode: "To Hell and Back"
1996	Poltergeist: The Legacy	Grave Digger	Episode: "The Fifth Sepulcher"
1998	JAG	Maj. Viktor Lushov	Episode: "To Russia with Love"
1999	Tracey Takes On...	Geoffrey Ayliss	Episode: "Hair"
1999	Star Trek: Voyager	Qatai	Episode: "Bliss"
2000	Diagnosis: Murder	Dr. Tom Arneberg	Episode: "The Unluckiest Bachelor in L.A."
2000	The Wild Thornberrys	Lead Jackal	Voice, episode: "Cheetahs Never Prosper"
2000–2001	Days of Our Lives	Charles	3 episodes
2001–2002	Hellsing	Peter Fargason	Voice, English dub, 10 episodes
2002	Justice League	Merlin	Voice, episode: "A Knight of Shadows"
2002	Crossing Jordan	Clive Alpert	Episode: "The Truth Is Out There"
2003	Charmed	Merrill	Episode: "The Day the Magic Died"
2003	Licensed by Royalty	Mister	13 episodes
2004	Kingdom Hospital	Narrator	3 episodes
2005	Alias	Milo Sabine	Episode: "Echoes"
2005	Cold Case	Dan O'Brien	Episode: "Creatures of the Night"
2005	Gilmore Girls	Town Elder	Episode: "Blame Booze and Melville"
2006–2007	Biker Mice from Mars	Lawrence Limburger	Voice, 3 episodes
2007	Criminal Minds	John Caulfield	Episode: "Birthright"
2009	NCIS	Marcin Jerek / Mr. Pain	Episode: "Broken Bird"
2010	Legend of the Seeker	The Keeper	Voice, 3 episodes
2010	Mad Men	Robert Pryce	Episode: "Hands and Knees"
2011	Doctor Who	Old Canton Everett Delaware III	Episode: "The Impossible Astronaut"
2011	It's Always Sunny in Philadelphia	Father Cullen	Episode: "How Mac Got Fat"
2011	Dexter	Father Nicholas Galway	Episode: "Sin of Omission"
2012	Young Justice	Sardath	Voice, episode: "Earthlings"
2016	The Librarians	Teddy Chislington	Episode: "And the Trial of the Triangle"

=== Video games ===
Year	Title	Role	Notes
1995	Shannara	Troll King, Eventine Elessedil	
1996	Zork Nemesis	Bishop Francois Malveaux	
1997	Outlaws	Bloodeye Tim	
1999	Medal of Honor	Colonel Stanley Hargrove	
2000	Star Wars: Force Commander	Heavy Gun Trooper / Ruulian Strip Miner	
2000	Escape from Monkey Island	Ignatius Cheese	
2000	Medal of Honor: Underground	Colonel Stanley Hargrove	
2001	Metal Gear Solid 2: Sons of Liberty	Gurlukovich Soldiers	
2002	Medal of Honor: Allied Assault	Colonel Stanley Hargrove	
2002	Medal of Honor: Frontline	Colonel Stanley Hargrove	
2002	Whacked!	Lucky	
2006	Medal of Honor: Heroes	Colonel Stanley Hargrove	
2009	Afro Samurai	Daimyo	
2009	The Conduit	John Adams	
2009	The Chronicles of Riddick: Assault on Dark Athena	Pavlo, Senate	
2009	Wet	William Ackers	
2010	Civilization V	Narrator, Additional voices	
