= Sarah Chalke =

Canadian actress (born 1976)

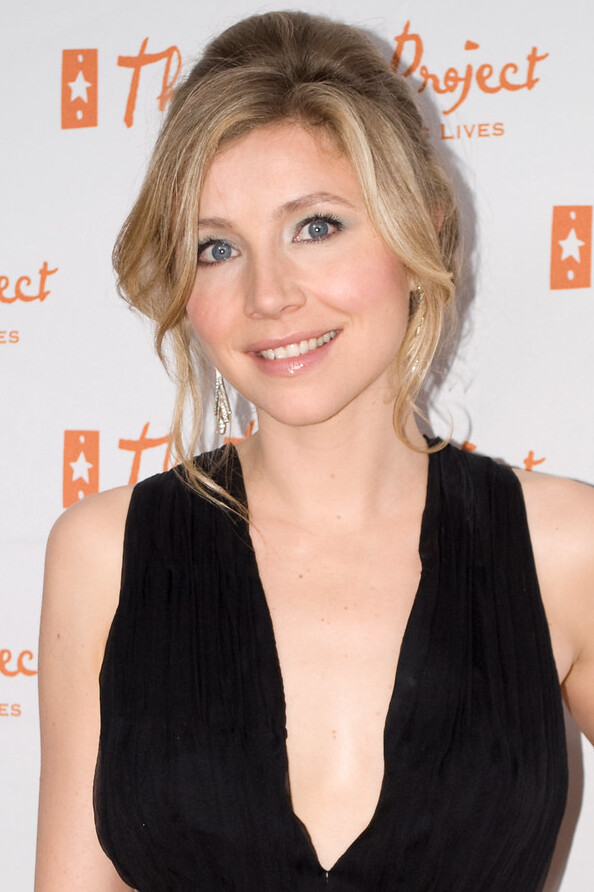
- Chalke in 2008
- Born: Sarah Louise Christine Chalke; August 27, 1976 (age 50); Ottawa, Ontario, Canada
- Occupation: Actress
- Years active: 1992–present
- Partner: Jamie Afifi (2003–2022)
- Children: 2

Sarah Louise Christine Chalke (/ˈtʃɔːk/; born August 27, 1976) is a Canadian actress. She is known for her starring roles as the second Becky Conner in the ABC sitcom Roseanne (1993–1997), Elliot Reid in the NBC/ABC medical comedy series Scrubs (2001–2010); and the 2026 revival series, Beth Smith and Space Beth in the Adult Swim animated science fiction series Rick and Morty (2013–present), and Kate Mularkey in the Netflix drama series Firefly Lane (2021–2023).

Chalke had recurring roles as Stella Zinman in the CBS sitcom How I Met Your Mother (2008–2009, 2014) and as Angie in the ABC/TBS sitcom Cougar Town (2012). She also had voice roles in the Netflix animated sitcom Paradise PD (2018–2021) and the Netflix animated adventure series Dogs in Space (2021–2022).

== Early life and education ==
Chalke was born at the Ottawa Civic Hospital on August 27, 1976, in Ottawa, Ontario, and was raised in North Vancouver, British Columbia. She is the middle of three daughters born to Douglas and Angela Chalke (née Piper).

She is from a German family who spoke German at home. She went to a French immersion school and is fluent in both English and French.

Chalke graduated from Handsworth Secondary School in North Vancouver in 1994.

== Career ==
Chalke's acting career began at age eight when she began appearing in musical theatre productions. At 12, she became a reporter on the Canadian children's show KidZone. In 1993, she took over the role of Rebecca Conner on Roseanne after Lecy Goranson left the series; Chalke made a cameo appearance as a different character in the Roseanne episode "Halloween: The Final Chapter" (#178, originally aired October 31, 1995) after Goranson returned. Chalke later returned to the role of Becky after Goranson departed for a second time. After the show ended, Chalke returned briefly to Canada, where she starred in the CBC Television drama Nothing Too Good for a Cowboy (1998–1999). In 1999, she also starred as a Russian KGB agent in the film Y2K (also known as Terminal Countdown), alongside Louis Gossett Jr. and Malcolm McDowell.

In 2001, she was cast as Dr. Elliot Reid in the NBC comedy series Scrubs and she would be a cast member for all nine seasons until the series ended its run in 2010. She has appeared in several feature films, including Ernest Goes to School and Cake. She appeared in Channel 101's The 'Bu with The Lonely Island, a parody of the hit show The O.C., but was credited as "Pamela Fenton". In 2007, she appeared as a supporting character in Chaos Theory, which starred fellow Canadian Ryan Reynolds. In 2008, Chalke became the spokesperson for a line of women's underwear by Hanes that included a series of commercials directed by her Scrubs co-star Zach Braff. In 2008 and 2009, she made appearances in the CBS sitcom How I Met Your Mother as Stella Zinman. In early 2011, she starred in the CBS television series Mad Love, a romantic comedy which debuted as a midseason replacement and was cancelled after only one season was produced.

Chalke was signed by former Scrubs executive producer Bill Lawrence to play the love interest of Bobby Cobb in the series Cougar Town. She appeared in multiple episodes in the third season. Chalke starred in the ABC comedy series How to Live with Your Parents (For the Rest of Your Life), which premiered April 3, 2013, and which was cancelled one month later. She played Polly, a single and very uptight divorced mother who found herself moving back in with her parents (Elizabeth Perkins and Brad Garrett) because of the economic downturn. Also in 2013, she played a frantic mother named Casey Hedges in the Grey's Anatomy season 9 episode "Can't Fight This Feeling". Chalke also voices Beth Smith and Space Beth on the Adult Swim animated science-fiction series Rick and Morty.

On April 28, 2017, it was announced that a revival of Roseanne was in the works, and that most of the original cast and some of the producers would return for the revival series. On May 16, 2017, it was confirmed that eight episodes of the show were greenlit by ABC and would air mid-season in 2018 with Chalke returning, but playing a role other than Becky Conner. Following its cancellation, she later returned for a guest appearance in its spinoff series, The Conners.

In February 2021, Chalke co-starred alongside Katherine Heigl in the role of Kate Mularkey for the Netflix series Firefly Lane.

In 2026, Chalke returned to play Dr. Elliot Reid in the Scrubs revival on ABC and Disney+.

== Personal life ==
In December 2006, Chalke became engaged to Canadian lawyer Jamie Afifi, after three years of dating. In September 2022, Chalke announced that they had called off the engagement and "separated some time ago". They have two children together, a son born in December 2009, and a daughter born in May 2016. Her son was diagnosed at two years old with Kawasaki disease.

She is a fan of the Vancouver Canucks.

=== Activism ===
Chalke's aunt and grandmother both died from breast cancer that was undiagnosed while in its early stages. She has since encouraged breast cancer detection and prevention, and starred in the Lifetime movie Why I Wore Lipstick to My Mastectomy. She is an ambassador for the Audrey Hepburn Children's Foundation. Chalke also made an appearance in a short video parodying a National Organization for Marriage's advertisement opposing same-sex marriage, "Gathering Storm". She was the 2009 ambassador for the Susan G. Komen Passionately Pink for the Cure program, for which she also designed a T-shirt.

== Filmography ==
=== Film ===
Year	Title	Role	Notes
1994	Ernest Goes to School	Maisy	
1999	Y2K	Myra Soljev	Also known as Terminal Countdown
2001	Kill Me Later	Linda	
2001	XCU: Extreme Close Up	Jane Bennett	
2005	Alchemy	Samantha Rose	
2005	Cake	Jane	
2007	Mama's Boy	Maya	
2008	Chaos Theory	Paula Crowe	
2016	Mother's Day	Gabi	
2016	After the Reality	Kate	Also executive producer
2020	The Wrong Missy	Julia	
2020	Eat Wheaties!	Frankie Riceborough	
2025	Playdate	Emily	
TBA	The Marshmallow Experiment	Colleen	Post-production

=== Television ===
Year	Title	Role	Notes
1992	The Odyssey	Realtor	Episode: "A Place Called Nowhere"
1992	Neon Rider	Annie	Episode: "Labour Day"
1992	City Boy	Angelica	Television film
1993–1997, 2018	Roseanne	Becky Conner-Healy / Andrea	Main role (seasons 6–7, 9); recurring role (seasons 8, 10)
1996	Robin of Locksley	Marion Fitzwater	Television film
1996	Stand Against Fear	Krista Wilson	Television film
1997	A Child's Wish	Melinda	Television film
1997	Dying to Belong	Drea Davenport	Television film
1997	Daughters	Annie Morrell	Television film
1997	Dead Man's Gun	Muriel Jakes	Episode: "The Bounty Hunter"
1998	I've Been Waiting for You	Sarah Zoltanne	Television film
1998–2000	Nothing Too Good for a Cowboy	Gloria Hobson	Main role
1999	First Wave	Chloe Wells	Episode: "The Channel"
2001–2010	Scrubs	Elliot Reid	Main role (seasons 1–8); recurring role (season 9)
2002	It's a Very Merry Muppet Christmas Movie	Elliot Reid	Television film
2002–2003	Clone High	X-Stream Erin / Marie Antoinette (voice)	3 episodes
2003–2004	The 'Bu	Melissa	Main role; The Lonely Island web series
2006	Why I Wore Lipstick to My Mastectomy	Geralyn Lucas	Television film
2008	Little Britain USA	Lisa Warren	Deleted scene
2008–2009, 2014	How I Met Your Mother	Stella Zinman	Recurring role
2009	Scrubs: Interns	Dr. Elliot Reid	Episode: "Our Bedside Manner"
2009	Maneater	Clarissa Alpert	Main role
2009	The Fresh Beat Band	The Good Witch	Episodes: "The Wizard of Song: Parts 1 & 2"
2009	Prep & Landing	Magee (voice)	Television film
2011	Mad Love	Kate Swanson	Main role
2011–2019	American Dad!	Cam / Meredith / Photographer (voice)	3 episodes
2011	Prep & Landing: Naughty vs. Nice	Magee (voice)	Television film
2012	Cougar Town	Angie	4 episodes
2013	Grey's Anatomy	Casey Hedges	Episode: "Can't Fight This Feeling"
2013	How to Live with Your Parents (For the Rest of Your Life)	Polly Green-Tatham	Main role
2013–present	Rick and Morty	Beth Smith and Space Beth (voice)	Main role
2015	Backstrom	Amy Gazanian	Recurring role
2015	Undateable	Sarah Chalke	Episode: "A Rock and a Hard Place Walk Into a Bar"
2016	Angie Tribeca	Mrs. Parsons	Episode: "The Famous Ventriloquist Did It"
2016	Inside Amy Schumer	Amy #2	Episode: "Psychopath Test"
2016–2019	Milo Murphy's Law	Mrs. Murawski (voice)	6 episodes
2017–2019	Speechless	Melanie	Recurring role
2018	Nobodies	Sarah Chalke	Episode: "Alone Star State"
2018	The Conners	Andrea	Episode: "One Flew Over the Conners' Nest"
2018	Friends from College	Merrill Morgan	4 episodes
2018–2021	Paradise PD	Gina Jabowski (voice)	Main role (seasons 1–3)
2020	Psych 2: Lassie Come Home	Dolores O'Riordan	Television film
2021–2023	Firefly Lane	Kate Mularkey	Main role
2021–2022	Dogs in Space	Stella (voice)	Main role
2023	Hailey's On It!	The Professor (voice)	Recurring role
2024	Animal Control	Yasmine	Episode: "Raccoons and Mutts"
2025	Prep & Landing: The Snowball Protocol	Magee (voice)	Television film
2026–present	Scrubs	Elliot Reid	Main role; also executive producer
