= How to Hook Up Your Home Theater =

2007 animated short film

- Poster for How to Hook Up Your Home Theater
- Directed by: Kevin Deters; Stevie Wermers-Skelton
- Story by: Kevin Deters; Wilbert Plijnaar; Stevie Wermers-Skelton; Dan Abraham
- Produced by: Tamara Boutcher
- Starring: Bill Farmer
- Narrated by: Corey Burton
- Edited by: Jeff Draheim
- Music by: Michael Giacchino
- Animation by: Andreas Deja; Mark Henn; Eric Goldberg; Dale Baer
- Color process: Digital; Technicolor
- Production company: Walt Disney Animation Studios
- Distributed by: Walt Disney Studios; Motion Pictures (Note: Distributed by Walt Disney Studios Motion Pictures through the Walt Disney Pictures banner, although it was credited as Buena Vista Pictures Distribution in the poster at the time.)
- Release date: December 21, 2007 (with National Treasure: Book of Secrets)
- Running time: 6 minutes
- Country: United States
- Language: English

How to Hook Up Your Home Theater is a 2007 American animated comedy short film produced by Walt Disney Animation Studios, directed by Kevin Deters, and co-directed by Stevie Wermers-Skelton. It was the first theatrical Goofy solo cartoon short since Goofy's Freeway Troubles (1965) 42 years earlier, and the first official short of the Goofy series since How to Sleep (1953).

== Plot ==
In the style of Goofy's "Everyman" cartoons of the 1950s, this short follows Goofy as he buys and then sets up his home cinema system to watch football.

== Production ==
The short was partially produced using a new "paperless" production pipeline for Disney, the first major change in production technique for hand-drawn animation at Disney since the introduction of CAPS, and was also an attempt to see if the new digital animation tools could be used to produce a short with the same graphic look as that of a late 1940s, early 1950s cartoon. Instead of animating with pencil on paper, some of the animators, such as Dale Baer, worked on Wacom's cintiq tablets along with Toon Boom Harmony for the animation, while other animators such as Mark Henn and Andreas Deja continued to work in the traditional method with pencil on paper. About 50% of the short was done using the new paperless technique.

== Release ==
The short was released with Disney's National Treasure: Book of Secrets on December 21, 2007. It was also paired with The Game Plan for the film's release in the United Kingdom. The short was shown early at the "Animate with the Greats" class taking place at Facet's Theatre. Several Walt Disney Animation Studios animation artists taught the class, including Kevin Deters and Stevie Wermers. It is also available for purchase on the iTunes Store. It was included in the Animation Show of Shows in 2007.

=== Home media ===
How to Hook Up Your Home Theater was released on the DVD Have a Laugh, Volume 1 on October 26, 2010. It was subsequently released on the Walt Disney Animation Studios Short Films Collection Blu-ray and DVD set on August 18, 2015.

== References to other media ==
- The two football teams are called the Dawgs and the Geefs, both of which refer to two of Goofy's pseudonyms over the years, Dippy Dawg (his earliest incarnation) and George Geef (the name he went by in his "everyman" shorts of the 1950s).
- When the box arrives, a label on the box says "Dopey Digital", a reference to Dolby Digital and Dopey, one of the Seven Dwarfs from Snow White and the Seven Dwarfs (1937). The construction number on the side of the box is M1C-K3Y MO-U5E, a reference to Mickey Mouse.
- On Goofy's shelf there is a photo of Walt Disney, Clarabelle Cow, Goofy's first appearance from Mickey's Revue (1932), and a signed caricature of John Lasseter, then-chief creative officer of Pixar and Disney Animation.
