= Dave Foley =

Canadian actor and stand-up comedian (born 1963)

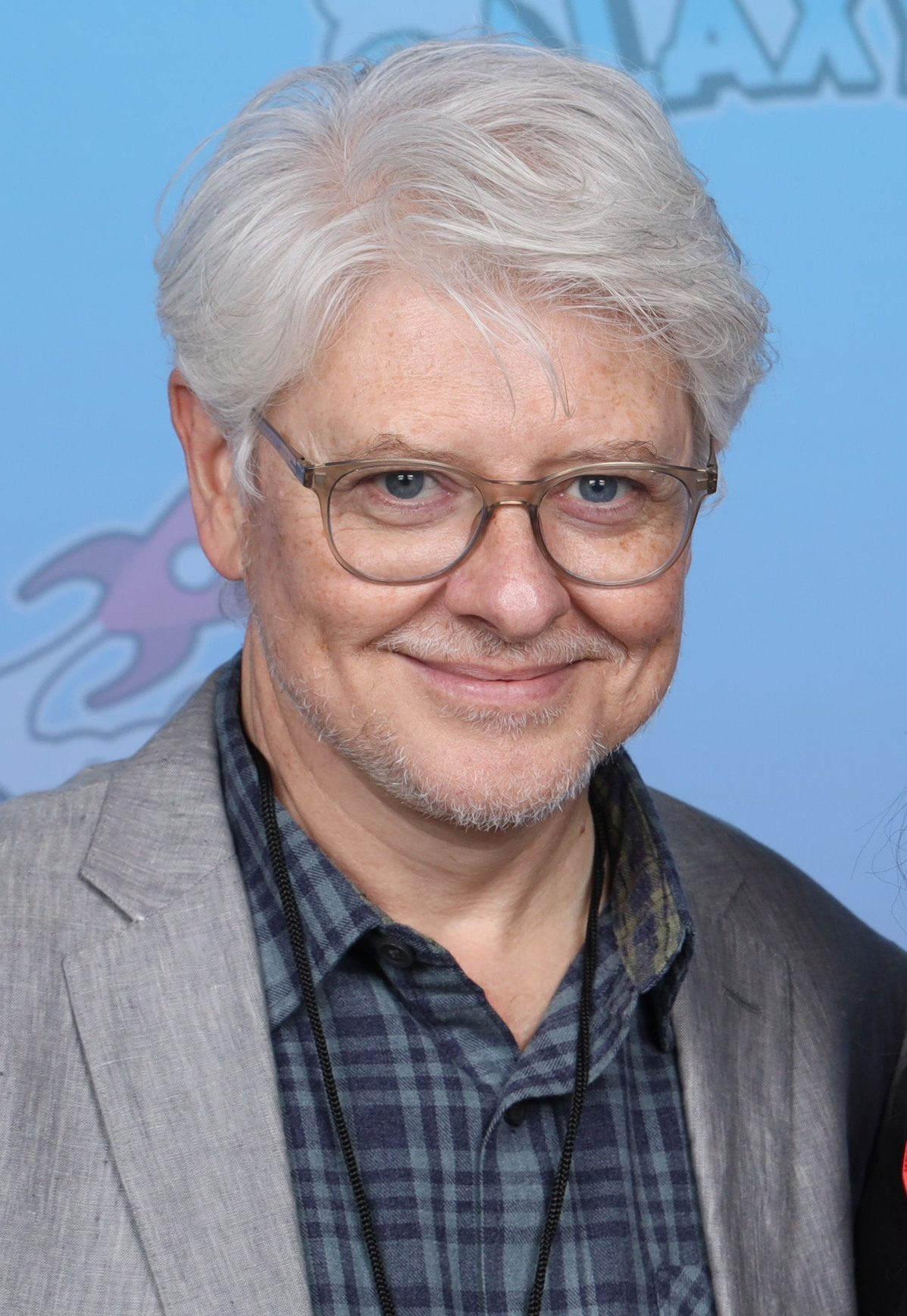
- Foley at the 2023 GalaxyCon Richmond
- Born: David Scott Foley; January 4, 1963 (age 63); Etobicoke, Ontario, Canada
- Occupations: Actor; stand-up comedian; director; producer; writer
- Spouses: Tabatha Southey (m. 1991; div. 1997); Crissy Guerrero (m. 2002; div. 2008) (m. 2016)
- Children: 3

Comedy career
- Years active: 1986–present
- Medium: Stand-up; film; television
- Genres: Observational comedy; improvisational comedy; character comedy; satire; surreal humour

David Scott Foley (born January 4, 1963) is a Canadian actor, stand-up comedian, director, producer, and writer. He is known as a co-founder of the comedy group The Kids in the Hall, who have appeared together in a number of television, stage and film productions, most notably the 1988–1995 TV sketch comedy show of the same name, as well as the 1996 film Brain Candy.

Dave Foley is also known for his roles as Dave Nelson in the sitcom NewsRadio, Flik in A Bug's Life, Troy in Blast from the Past, Dr. Fulton in The Middle, Bob in Hot in Cleveland, Gary O'Brien in Young Sheldon, and Danish Graves in Fargo. Foley also hosted Celebrity Poker Showdown.

== Early life ==
Foley was born in Etobicoke, Ontario. He is the son of Mary and Michael, a steamfitter. His mother is from Stafford, England.

== Career ==
=== Acting and stand-up comedy ===
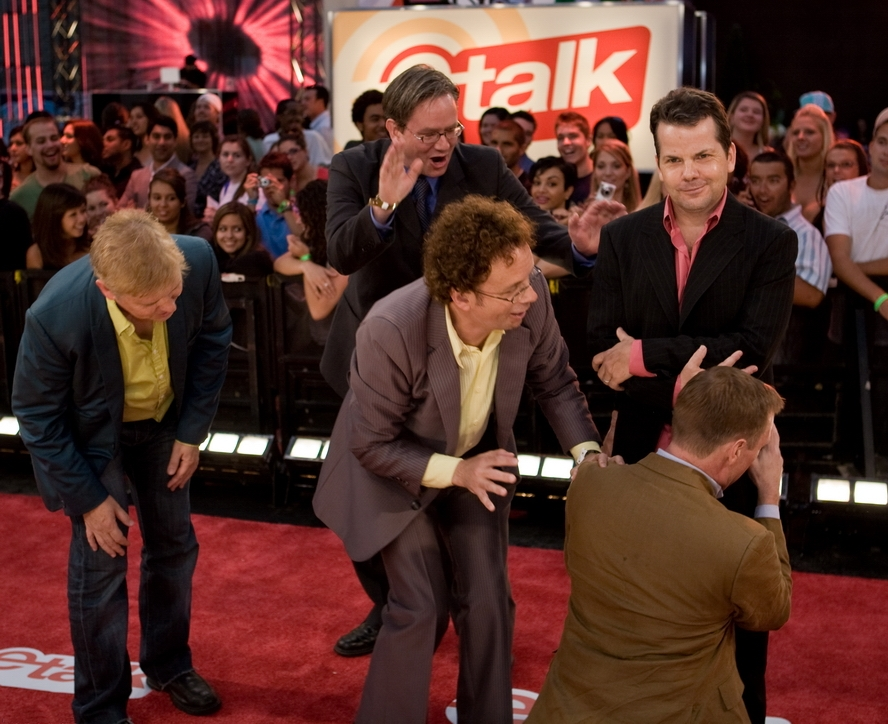
The Kids in the Hall at the 2008 Toronto International Film Festival (Foley at left)

Dropping out of high school, Foley pursued standup comedy for about a year in the Toronto Second City Training Centre, where he began taking improv classes and met Kevin McDonald, who gave him a job as an usher at a local art house theatre. He played Lewis Allen in the miniseries Anne of Avonlea. Foley, McDonald, Bruce McCulloch, Mark McKinney and Scott Thompson formed The Kids in the Hall in 1984. The troupe's eponymous TV series debuted in 1988 and ended in 1995. Foley played characters including Hecubus, one of the Sizzler sisters, the A. T. & Love boss, Bruno Puntz Jones, Mr. Heavyfoot, Jocelyn and Lex. Initially involved with Kids in the Hall: Brain Candy, he left the troupe in the middle of the writing, dissatisfied with the internal strife and the quality of the script, and joined the NewsRadio cast instead. As he had not signed any contract with the studio, Foley agreed to sign a deal which would allow the rest of the troupe to get paid for the script, though he was convinced that it would never be shot. When it was greenlighted, Foley appeared in the film because he was contractually obligated to do so. He is the only member of the group who is uncredited as a writer. Foley rejoined the troupe in 2000 and has been an integral part of their various reformations. He appeared in the Kids in the Hall 2010 reunion project Death Comes to Town. Paul Simms, creator of NewsRadio, happened to be a huge fan of Foley's work and wrote the role of Dave Nelson specifically for him. Much of his character on the show was based on his own personality quirks, including his coffee addiction and his love of the sitcom Green Acres. In 1999, Foley portrayed Troy, the house mate of Eve, in Blast from the Past.

Foley was recently reunited with NewsRadio writer Joe Furey when he recorded the special featurette Working with Joe Furey, an add-on to Furey's comedy Love and Support. Foley released his stand-up special, Relatively Well in January 2013, distributed by Showtime. In the comedy-thriller The Wrong Guy, Foley played Nelson Hibbert, an office worker who finds his boss murdered, mistakenly believes he will be blamed for the crime and runs off as a fugitive. In 2001, he played the boss of 'N Sync singer Lance Bass in the film On the Line. Foley hosted the CBC Christmas Special, The True Meaning of Christmas Specials, in which he, a Mexican Elvis impersonator, Elvis Stojko and Dick Dale travel to Canada in search of the true meaning of Christmas specials. He portrayed Jack McFarland's boyfriend Stuart Lamarack on Will & Grace in its 2003-2004 season. In 2004, Foley became host of Celebrity Poker Showdown on Bravo. In 2007, he appeared nude in Uwe Boll's film adaptation of the controversial PC game Postal and became the judge for the US version of Thank God You're Here. He portrayed a middle management employee who happens to be a vampire in the undead office comedy Netherbeast Incorporated (2007) and voiced the disgruntled elf Wayne in the holiday special series, Prep & Landing. He also guest-starred in the 2007 special, Bob & Doug McKenzie's Two-Four Anniversary. He played a high school principal in It's Always Sunny in Philadelphia. In 2011, he appeared in How I Met Your Mother as Marshall's possible future boss, Mr. Bloom.

From 2011 to 2012, Foley played Jerry Dunham, the boss of Andrew Carlson (David Hornsby) in the short-lived CBS sitcom How to Be a Gentleman. In 2012 and 2013, Foley played Dr. Fulton, Brick's (Atticus Shaffer) school therapist in The Middle, where in "Life Skills", he refers to Brick's classmates as "the kids in the hall", after an awkward pause and glance by both characters and mentioning that their behavior is similar to those of comedy sketches from The Kids in the Hall. In February 2013, Foley played Detective Bob Moore for the three last seasons in the TV Land sitcom, Hot in Cleveland (with an unrelated guest appearance as a charity doctor in the first season), starred in the third season of Robson Arms on CTV and also starred in the CTV sitcom Spun Out in 2014. Foley also starred in ABC's Dr. Ken. In 2023, Foley portrayed central character Danish Graves in the fifth season of Fargo.

Foley has also voiced various characters in animated films, television series and video games, such as Flik in A Bug's Life (as well as reprising for a cameo of the character during the outtakes of Toy Story 2 and the epilogue of Cars as well as in a segment from Robot Chicken, and video games like Lego The Incredibles), Yes Man in Fallout: New Vegas, Terry in Monsters University, Agent Rick in Pound Puppies, Chris in Dan Vs. and Wayne in the Prep & Landing series.

=== Web series ===
In 2009, Foley was hired by 49 North Inc./Fuel Industries, a multi-national branded content and entertainment company, to star in a web series titled, The Sensible Traveler with Bobby Fargo with six episodes that are written by TV writer Stephen Hibbert and directed by a number of people, including Leslie Iwerks and Chris Roach. The series is one of 49 North Inc./Fuel Industries' most successful web series at well over 20,000 hits since the beginning of 2010. No word has yet been released as to a second season being filmed.

=== Music video appearances ===
In 1993, Dave Foley appeared along with Mark McKinney and Kevin McDonald in the music video for the song "Heterosexual Man" by Vancouver band Odds. In the video, the three comedians played stereotypical macho jocks in the audience of a small bar where Odds are playing until Foley inexplicably turns into a woman.

He appeared, as one of the Daves, in fellow cast member Bruce McCulloch's music video "The Daves I Know".

He starred in the music video for the 2005 song "Yellow Datsun" by Neva Dinova. In 2008, he appeared in the alternate music video for the song "Americanarama" by Ottawa band Hollerado, where he parodied American Apparel CEO Dov Charney. He also appeared in the music video for the band's song "Desire 126". In 2010, Foley appeared in a music video for the Los Angeles band Black Robot's cover of the JJ Cale song "Cocaine", which was filmed at the burlesque club Jumbo's Clown Room. In 2012, Foley starred in Off!'s music video for their song Borrow and Bomb, playing a "professional educator" named Dale Antwerp who hosts a public access talk show entitled Teen Talk. He appeared in another Off! video in 2014 for their song "Red White and Black", playing the role of a fascist organizer.

== Personal life ==
Dave Foley married Canadian writer Tabatha Southey on December 31, 1991. They divorced in 1997. The couple has two sons. In 2001, an interim child support agreement obligated Foley to pay Southey $10,700 a month, a figure based on his income when NewsRadio was in production. By 2011, Foley claimed that his earnings had declined to the point that the $10,700 sum constituted "literally 400 percent of [his] income" but he was unable to get the obligation reduced in court. Owing over half a million dollars in back payments, he believed that if he returned to Canada he would be arrested under orders from Ontario's Family Responsibility Office. By 2013, Foley and Southey had settled a child support lawsuit, and he was able to resume work in the country of his birth. After he took the lead role in Spun Out, he told Vancouver's The Georgia Straight that "I made enough money to pay the price of admission to Canada."

Dave Foley married his second wife, actress Crissy Guerrero, on August 1, 2002. The marriage ended in a divorce in 2008. They have a daughter, Alina Chiara Foley, who has worked as a child actor. Guerrero and Foley subsequently reconciled and were remarried on December 31, 2016.

Throughout his life, Foley has suffered from depression. He "used to drink quite a bit", but stopped drinking on December 22, 2014, after he fell backwards while intoxicated, resulting in a severe head injury. Foley suffered a subdural hematoma and spent four days in the intensive care unit. In February 2019, he remarked that he had not "had a drink in four years" and had experienced almost no depression following his injury.

Foley resided in downtown Los Angeles, before moving to New York City in 2022. He is a fan of coffee, claiming to drink up to "50 cups a day when I am on set". This was used as the basis for an episode of NewsRadio.

He is an atheist.

== Filmography ==
Key
†	Denotes films that have not yet been released

=== Comedy specials ===
Year	Title	Role	Notes
2013	Dave Foley: Relatively Well	Himself	Stand-up special

=== Film ===
Year	Title	Role	Notes
1986	High Stakes	Bo Baker	
1987	Three Men and a Baby	Grocery Store Clerk	
1994	It's Pat	Chris	
1996	Kids in the Hall: Brain Candy	Marv / Psychiatrist / New guy / Raymond Hurdicure	
1997	The Wrong Guy	Nelson Hibbert	Also writer
1997	Hacks	Neal	
1998	A Bug's Life	Flik	Lead voice role
1999	Blast from the Past	Troy	
1999	South Park: Bigger, Longer & Uncut	William Baldwin	Voice cameo
1999	Dick	Bob Haldeman	
1999	Toy Story 2	Flik	Voice cameo, outtakes
2001	Monkeybone	Herb	
2001	On the Line	Higgins	
2002	Run Ronnie Run	Network Executive #1	
2002	Swindle	Michael Barnes	
2002	Stark Raving Mad	Roy	
2003	Grind	Tour Manager	
2003	My Boss's Daughter	Henderson	
2004	Employee of the Month	Eric	
2004	Ham & Cheese	Tom Brennemen	
2004	Intern Academy	Dr. Denton Whiteside	
2004	Childstar	Philip Templeman	
2005	Sky High	Jonathan Boy / All-American Boy	
2006	Goose on the Loose	Goose	Voice
2006	Cars	Flik Car	Additional voices, cameo
2007	California Dreaming	Stu Gainor	
2007	Netherbeast Incorporated	Henry Welby	
2007	Postal	Uncle Dave	
2008	Coopers' Camera	Bill Davidson	
2009	Suck	Jeff	
2010	Vampires Suck	Principal Smith	
2011	Monster Brawl	Buzz Chambers	
2012	Last Call	Mr. Nunley	
2012	Freeloaders	Himself	
2013	Monsters University	Terry	Voice
2013	Party Central	Terry	Voice; short film
2015	Being Canadian	Himself	Documentary
2016	Revengeance	Ace of Spades	Voice role; uncredited
2018	Second Act	Felix Herman	
2019	Benjamin	Mitch	
2020	Onward	Rogue Waiter	Additional voices; special thanks
2024	Space Cadet	Rudolph Bolton	

=== Television ===
Year	Title	Role	Notes
1987	Anne of Green Gables: The Sequel	Lewis Allen	Miniseries
1987	American Playhouse	Welsh Rabbit / Old Ironsides / Smith	Episode: "The Prodigious Hickey"
1988–1995; 2022	The Kids in the Hall	Various characters / Jaques	109 episodes
1995–1999	NewsRadio	Dave Nelson	97 episodes
1996	Mr. Show with Bob and David	Todd	Episode: "Operation Hell on Earth"
1998	From the Earth to the Moon	Alan Bean	Episode: "That's All There Is"
2001	Committed	Bob the Dog	13 episodes
2001	Becker	Owen	Episode: "Hanging with Jake"
2002	The Tick	Francis	Episode: "Arthur, Interrupted"
2002	Just Shoot Me!	Jay	Episode: "Blind Ambition"
2003	The Toronto Show	Various	Episode: "#1.1"
2003	Odd Job Jack	Gary Gerbil	Episode: "The Wheel Is Not Enough"
2003	The King of Queens	Psychiatrist	Episode: "Jung Frankenstein"
2003	What's New, Scooby-Doo?	Laslow Oswald	Voice, episode: "High-Tech House of Horrors"
2003	Lilo & Stitch: The Series	Priest	Voice, episode: "Fibber: Experiment 032"
2003	Grounded for Life	Derek Purcell	Episode: "Baby Come Back"
2004	Will & Grace	Stuart Lamarack	5 episodes
2004	I'm with Her	Principal Harris	Episode: "Friends in Low Places"
2004	Prom Queen: The Marc Hall Story	Mr. Warrick	Television film
2005	Las Vegas	Mertens	Episode: "Letters, Lawyers and Loose Women"
2005	Father of the Pride	Kelsey Grammer's Cat	Voice, episode: "Stage Fright"
2005	Hot Properties	Ted Begley Jr.	Episode: "The Return of the Ring"
2006	Lovespring International	Timothy Entsweiler	Episode: "The Loser Club"
2006	Tom Goes to the Mayor	Dr. Foley	Episode: "Glass Eyes"
2006–2007	Scrubs	Dr. Lester Hedrick	2 episodes
2007	The Batman	Francis Grey	Voice, episode: "Seconds"
2007	Slacker Cats	Cult cat	Voice, episode: "Buckley on the Run"
2007	Little Mosque on the Prairie	U.S. Consulate Clerk	Episode: "No Fly List"
2007–2009	The New Adventures of Old Christine	Tom	3 episodes
2008	Carpoolers	Mr. Latero	Episode: "Take Your Daughter to Work Day"
2008	In Plain Sight	Horst Vanderhof	Episode: "Trojan Horst"
2008	Robson Arms	Chuck Hoskins	5 episodes
2008	Brothers & Sisters	Paul	Episode: "Going Once... Going Twice"
2008	Stargate: Atlantis	Malcolm Tunney	Episode: "Brain Storm"
2009	True Jackson, VP	Ted Begley, Jr.	Episode: "Company Retreat"
2009–2011	Prep & Landing shorts	Wayne	Voice, television short
2010	Less Than Kind	Dr. Raymond Sheasgreen	Episode: "Third Death's a Charm"
2010	The Kids in the Hall: Death Comes to Town	Various roles	Miniseries
2010	The Soup	Grownup Pageant Princess	Episode dated August 6
2010	Leverage	Eben Dooley Jr.	Episode: "The Ho Ho Ho Job"
2010–2013	It's Always Sunny in Philadelphia	Prin. MacIntyre	3 episodes
2010; 2013–2015	Hot in Cleveland	Bob / Dr. Moore	19 episodes
2011	Desperate Housewives	Monroe Carter	Episode: "Flashback"
2011	How I Met Your Mother	Mr. Bloom	Episode: "Challenge Accepted"
2011	Friends with Benefits	Keith	Episode: "The Benefit of Forgetting"
2011	Pound Puppies	Agent Rick	Voice, episode: "Homeward Pound"
2011	Eureka	Dr. Plotkin	Episode: "One Giant Leap"
2011	Nick Swardson's Pretend Time	Capt. Rudd	Episode: "The Mis-Education of Garry Gaga"
2011–2012	How to Be a Gentleman	Jerry	9 episodes
2011–2013	Dan Vs.	Chris	Voice, main role
2012	Unsupervised	Darren	Voice, episode: "Rich Girl"
2012–2018	The Middle	Dr. Fulton	7 episodes
2013	Robot Chicken	Flik / Space Invader / Allan Sherwood	Voice, episode: "Choked on a Bottle Cap"
2013	Newsreaders	Donny Hayflack	Episode: "31-Up"
2013	Maron	Himself	Episode: "Internet Troll"
2013	Veep	Osmo Häkkinen	Episode: "Helsinki"
2013	The Goodwin Games	Mr. Quilty	Episode: "Hamletta"
2013	We Are Men	Carter's Dad	Episode: "Pilot"
2013; 2016	Comedy Bang! Bang!	The Bomber / King Arthur	2 episodes
2013	Dads	Ben	Episode: "Dad Abuse"
2014	Justified	Canadian Gangster	Episode: "A Murder of Crowes"
2014	Mr. Pickles	Scientist	Voice, episode: "The Lair"
2014–2015	Spun Out	Dave Lyons	26 episodes
2015	The Odd Couple	Roy	4 episodes
2015–2017	Harvey Beaks	Moff, additional voices	Voice, 14 episodes
2015–2017	Dr. Ken	Pat Hein	Main role, 44 episodes
2016–2019	Bajillion Dollar Propertie$	Xavier King	3 episodes
2016	Delmer & Marta	Creston's Boss	2 episodes
2016	Fugget About It	Sasquatch	Voice, episode: "Sasquatchewan"
2017–2018	Adventure Time	Warren Ampersand	Voice, 2 episodes
2018	Bobcat Goldthwait's Misfits & Monsters	Jim 'Bull' Bidwell	Episode: "Face in the Car Lot"
2018–2019	Rise of the Teenage Mutant Ninja Turtles	Bullhop / Stanley	Voice, 2 episodes
2019	Drunk History	Alexis Pulaski	Episode: "Fame"
2019	Carter	Dwick Brisebois	Episode: "Harley Takes a Bow"
2020	Fresh Off the Boat	Principal Reed	Episode: "A Seat at the Table"
2021	Superstore	Lowell Anderson	Episode: "Lowell Anderson"
2021	The Morning Show	Peter Bullard	Episode: "A Private Person"
2021–2023	Young Sheldon	Gary O'Brien	3 episodes
2022	LOL: Last One Laughing Canada	Himself	6 episodes
2022	Super PupZ	Professor Dennis	Series lead
2022–2023	Dark Side of Comedy	Himself / Narrator	20 episodes
2023	Fargo	Danish Graves	Main role (season 5)
2024	Night Court	Duncan	Episode: "The Duke's a Hazard"
2025	Prep & Landing: The Snowball Protocol	Wayne	Voice, television short
2025	Murdoch Mysteries	Mr. Knight	Episode: "Sugar Plum Murdoch"
2026	Star Trek: Strange New Worlds	Dendru	Episode "Human Best Friend"

=== Video games ===
Year	Title	Voice role
1998	A Bug's Life	Flik
2010	Fallout: New Vegas	Yes Man
2018	Lego The Incredibles	Flik

=== Theme parks ===
Year	Title	Role	Notes
1998	It's Tough to Be a Bug!	Flik	Voice

=== Web ===
Year	Title	Role	Notes
2017	Kevin Pollak's Chat Show	Himself/Guest	Episode: "306"
