= Olaf's Frozen Adventure =

2017 animated short film

- Theatrical release poster
- Directed by: Kevin Deters; Stevie Wermers
- Screenplay by: Jac Schaeffer
- Produced by: Roy Conli
- Starring: Josh Gad; Kristen Bell; Idina Menzel; Jonathan Groff
- Cinematography: Alessandro Jacomini
- Edited by: Jeremy Milton; Jesse Averna
- Music by: Christophe Beck; Jeff Morrow (uncredited)
- Layouts by: Cory Rocco Florimonte
- Production company: Walt Disney Animation Studios
- Distributed by: Walt Disney Studios Motion Pictures (Note: Distributed by Walt Disney Studios Motion Pictures through the Walt Disney Pictures banner.)
- Release date: November 22, 2017 (with Coco)
- Running time: 21 minutes
- Country: United States
- Language: English

Olaf's Frozen Adventure is a 2017 American animated musical comedy short film produced by Walt Disney Animation Studios and directed by Kevin Deters and Stevie Wermers. The screenplay was written by Jac Schaeffer, with Josh Gad, Kristen Bell, Idina Menzel, and Jonathan Groff reprising their roles from Frozen (2013).

In November 2017, Olaf's Frozen Adventure premiered in theaters for a limited-time engagement in 3D format preceding the screening of Pixar's Coco and made its television debut on ABC in the following December. It received mixed reviews from critics. The short film was nominated for Best Animated Special Production, Outstanding Achievement for Animated Effects in an Animated Production, and Outstanding Achievement for Music in an Animated Feature Production at the 45th Annie Awards.

== Plot ==
It is the first Christmas season in Arendelle since the gates had been reopened and Anna and Elsa host a celebration for the townspeople. Olaf, full of Christmas spirit, cannot wait for the celebrations to begin. However, the townspeople leave early to prepare for their holiday traditions, and to not intrude on Anna and Elsa’s traditions. Following Anna and Elsa into the ballroom, Olaf wants to know about their favorite family tradition, but they do not believe that they have any personal traditions, especially after they became distant from each other. Upon hearing Elsa blame herself for this, Olaf decides to look for traditions and see if any of them are suitable to borrow or adapt.

Accompanied by Sven and taking Kristoff’s sleigh, he goes through the kingdom, and learns about various family traditions that relate to Christmas, Hanukkah, and Winter Solstice. He puts something from every household onto the sleigh. After visiting Oaken, Olaf and Sven travel back to the castle with their sleigh full of traditions. However, a piece of coal from a portable sauna that Oaken had given them sets the sleigh on fire. The sleigh drags them down a mountainside, and they are flung to opposite sides of a ravine. The sleigh goes over the cliff and explodes into the snow below. With only a fruit cake, Olaf attempts to travel back to the castle through the woods and is attacked by a pack of wolves.

Meanwhile, Elsa feels bad for walking away from Anna, and decides to apologize. She finds Anna in the castle’s attic, where they discover some forgotten items. Sven returns to Kristoff, and attempts to tell Kristoff that Olaf is in danger to no avail. Realizing what he is attempting to say, Anna tells them and Elsa to prepare for a search and rescue. Elsewhere, Olaf manages to escape the wolves, but the fruit cake is stolen by a hawk. He falls into a deep depression and sits by a tree not too far from the kingdom. Anna and Elsa gather the residents of Arendelle to go look for him. Anna and Elsa manage to find him and reveal that they have a tradition: Himself. After they had been isolated from each other, Anna annually slid cards and dolls of Olaf under Elsa’s door. Elsa uses her magic to create an ice Christmas tree, which she decorates with the search party’s lanterns, and a star of ice around Anna's small Olaf sculpture, which Olaf hangs on top.

== Voice Cast ==
- Josh Gad as Olaf, a talking snowman who was magically created by Elsa in the first film.
- Kristen Bell as Anna, Elsa's younger sister and the Princess of Arendelle.
- Idina Menzel as Elsa, Anna's elder sister and Queen of Arendelle.
  - Eva Bella as Young Elsa
- Jonathan Groff as Kristoff, an ice seller who is accompanied by a reindeer named Sven.
- Chris Williams as Oaken, the owner of Wandering Oaken's Trading Post and Sauna.
- John de Lancie as Mr. Olsen
- Lauri Fraser as Mrs. Olsen
- Benjamin Deters as Candy Cane Kid

== Production ==
On February 9, 2016, the short was announced as a television special set to be released on ABC, which would be produced by Roy Conli, and directed by Kevin Deters and Stevie Wermers. The title was revealed during the airing of The Making of Frozen: Return to Arendelle on ABC in 2016, and it was announced that it would feature original songs by Elyssa Samsel and Kate Anderson, the latter the sister of Frozen songwriter Kristen Anderson-Lopez. However, in June 2017, it was announced that the film would instead receive a limited-time theatrical release in front of Pixar's Coco, as it was deemed too cinematic for television. It reprises the main cast from the Frozen (2013) including the return of Josh Gad, Kristen Bell, Idina Menzel, and Jonathan Groff.

The music was recorded by an 80-piece orchestra in May 2017. The short was the filmmakers' first musical. They noted the requirement to keep the plot "pretty simple", and commented that they removed anything that diverted too much from that story. The fruitcake jokes in the short are a continuing motif from the filmmakers' previous project Prep & Landing. As they crafted the story, the Frozen team had barely started sketching out the plot of Frozen 2.

== Soundtrack ==
Olaf's Frozen Adventure (Original Soundtrack)

Soundtrack album by Various artists
- Released: November 3, 2017
- Recorded: May 2017
- Length: 25:40
- Label: Walt Disney
- Producers: Elyssa Samsel; Kate Anderson; Christophe Beck; Jeff Morrow

There are four original songs in the film, written by Elyssa Samsel and Kate Anderson, titled "Ring in the Season", "The Ballad of Flemmingrad", "That Time of Year" and "When We're Together". The film's score was composed by Christophe Beck and Jeff Morrow. The full soundtrack was released on November 3, 2017, by Walt Disney Records.

Original Soundtrack
No.	Title	Performer(s)	Length
1.	"Ring in the Season"	Kristen Bell; Idina Menzel; Josh Gad	1:58
2.	"The Ballad of Flemmingrad"	Jonathan Groff	0:44
3.	"Ring in the Season" (Reprise)	Menzel	1:16
4.	"That Time of Year"	Gad; Menzel; Bell; Cast	3:03
5.	"That Time of Year" (Reprise)	Gad	0:52
6.	"When We're Together"	Menzel; Bell; Gad; Groff	2:50
7.	"Olaf's Frozen Adventure" (Score Suite)	Christophe Beck; Jeff Morrow	4:27
8.	"The Ballad of Flemmingrad" (Traditional Version)	Groff	3:06
9.	"Ring in the Season" (Instrumental Karaoke Mix)	Elyssa Samsel; Kate Anderson	1:58
10.	"That Time of Year" (Instrumental Karaoke Mix)	Samsel; Anderson	3:02
11.	"When We're Together" (Instrumental Karaoke Mix)	Samsel; Anderson	2:49
Total length:			25:40

== Release ==
With the exception of Pixar's first film, Toy Story (1995), which was not theatrically preceded by a short film worldwide, all of Pixar's feature films from A Bug's Life (1998) to Cars 3 (2017) had been preceded by a new in-house Pixar short film during their full initial worldwide theatrical runs until the release of Coco (2017). Olaf's Frozen Adventure, in a 3D format, was chosen to precede screenings of Pixar's Coco beginning on November 22, 2017. Coco co-director Adrian Molina said that the short's placement before Coco was "a little bit of an experiment" given that (at 21 minutes) it was longer than the shorts that typically precede Pixar movies. The week after Coco's release in Mexico, local media noted audiences' strong dislike for the length of the film. A few days later, all Mexican cinemas offered apologies and removed the short from the exhibition. It was reported that some theaters put warning signs up about the length of the short ahead of Coco. Olaf's Frozen Adventure ended its limited-time run in U.S. screenings on December 8.

In the UK, Olaf's Frozen Adventure was shown before re-releases of Frozen on November 25 and 26, and December 2 and 3, 2017.

On November 23, Disney announced the release of Olaf's Frozen Adventure on Disney's cable television channels in Latin America, along with Netflix, on December 8, and later on Mexican channels Azteca 7 and 13. The short made its network television debut on ABC on December 14, 2017, as part of 25 Days of Christmas. It was viewed by an estimated 5.64 million people in the United States.

=== Critical response ===
On the review aggregator website Rotten Tomatoes, 57% of 7 critics' reviews are positive, with an average rating of 5.1/10.

Bill Desowitz of IndieWire deemed the short as a "bridge" and a "setup" to Frozen 2. Nicola Methven of Daily Mirror felt it would "tide fans over" until the next feature-length installment of the franchise. Writing for KSDK, Patrick Ryan commented it is an "Adventure' worth taking," while Ben Pearson of /Film wrote that "When We're Together" had the potential to be 2017's version of "Let It Go". Marissa Martinelli of Slate criticized the short's commercialism and felt that it was an "increasingly desperate one-man show." Alissa Wilkinson of Vox reported that audiences in North America have been critical of Disney's promotional strategy of prescreening the short before the main attraction. Additionally, she suggested that the featurette would be better off broadcast to television as originally planned instead.

=== Accolades ===
Olaf's Frozen Adventure received three nominations at the 45th Annie Awards. The development of the featurette was nominated for the Best Animated Special Production. Christopher Hendryx, Dan Lund, Mike Navarro, Hiroaki Narita, and Steven Chitwood were nominated for Animated Effects in an Animated Production for their contributions to the project. Elyssa Samsel, Kate Anderson, and Christophe Beck were nominated for Music in an Animated Feature Production for their musical performance incorporated into the featurette.

== Home media ==
The featurette was released as a Tesco-exclusive DVD in the United Kingdom on December 7, 2017 with a digital format release on December 19. A Blu-ray/DVD was released in the US and Canada on November 13, 2018. The 2017 digital format release and the 2018 Blu-ray/DVD release included six additional Disney short films: Polar Trappers (1938), Winter (1930), The Hockey Champ (1939), The Art of Skiing (1941), Once Upon a Wintertime (1954), and Pluto's Christmas Tree (1952).

== See also ==
- List of Christmas films
