= Paul Campbell (Canadian actor) =

Canadian actor (born 1979)

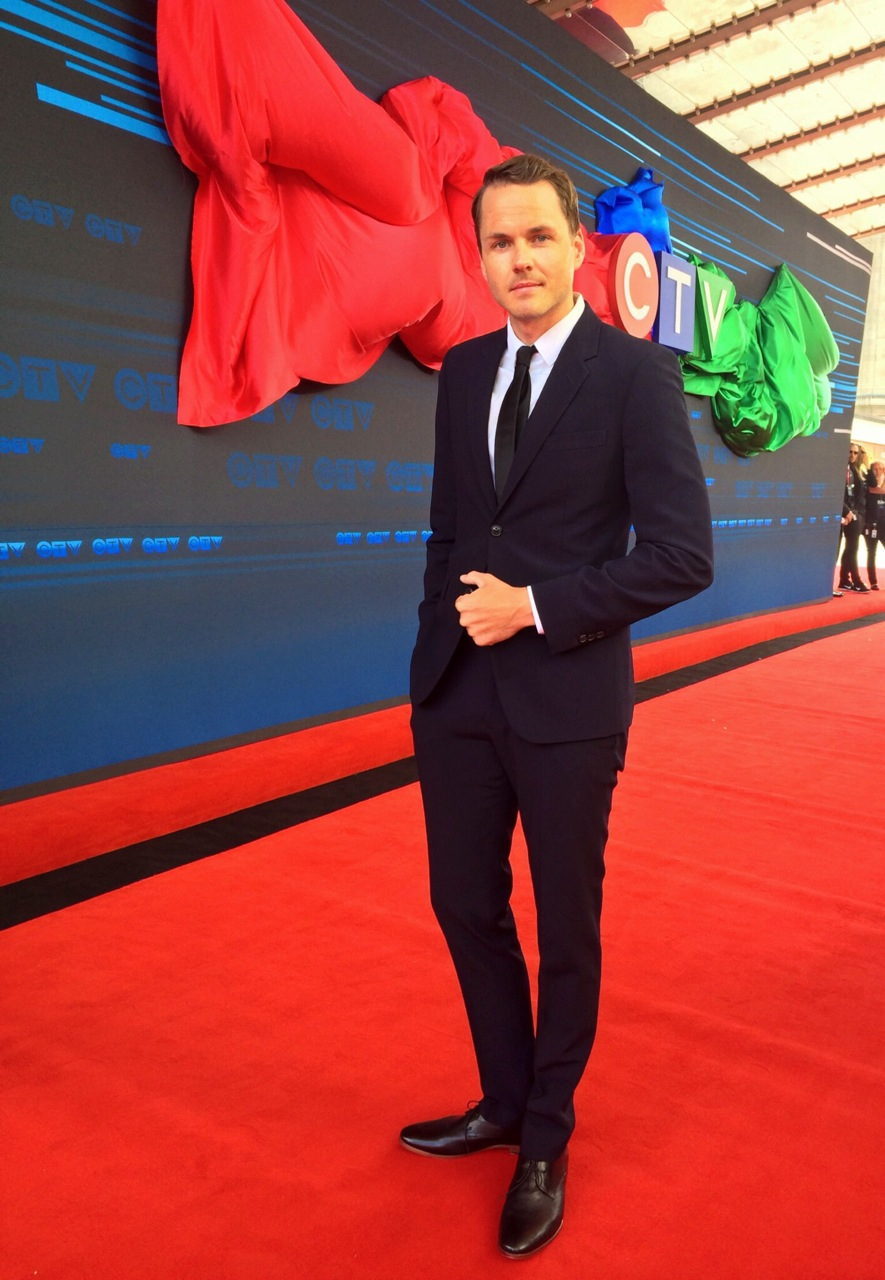
- Paul Campbell on the red carpet at CTV Television Network's 2014 Upfront presentation
- Born: Paul Campbell; June 22, 1979 (age 47); Vancouver, British Columbia, Canada
- Years active: 2002-present
- Spouse: Lorie Metz Campbell (m. 2009)
- Children: 1

Paul Campbell (born June 22, 1979) is a Canadian actor.

== Life and career ==
Paul grew up in White Rock, British Columbia, and graduated from Semiahmoo Secondary in 1997.

From 2004 to 2006 he portrayed Billy Keikeya on the reimagined Battlestar Galactica. Campbell's character was a personal assistant to President Laura Roslin.

Campbell made his first foray into comedy in 2005, starring in the Bill Lawrence TV pilot Nobody's Watching, for The WB. The pilot was not picked up to series but gained later notoriety when it was posted to YouTube. He starred in National Lampoon's Bag Boy with Dennis Farina in 2007.

In 2008, Campbell appeared in the romantic comedy Play the Game alongside Andy Griffith, Doris Roberts, Liz Sheridan, and Marla Sokoloff. Campbell played a young ladies' man who teaches his lonely, widowed grandfather how to re-enter the dating world after a 60-year hiatus.

Also in 2008, Campbell, playing "Billy" for the second time co-starred on NBC's Knight Rider reboot.

In March 2009, Campbell was cast in an ABC comedy pilot based on the British series No Heroics, which revolves around four B-list superheroes. He played the leader of the group, Pete, aka Chillout, a Canadian-born superhero who can freeze small objects. The pilot was not picked up by ABC.

In 2010, Campbell starred in the comedy series Almost Heroes alongside series co-creator Ryan Belleville and actors Colin Mochrie, Lauren Ash and Athena Karkanis. The series debuted on Showcase in June 2011, with the finale of the eight-episode first season airing July 21.

Campbell led the cast of the CTV comedy series Spun Out, alongside Dave Foley, Rebecca Dalton, Al Mukadam, Holly Deveaux, J. P. Manoux and Darcy Michael.

== Filmography ==
Film
Year	Title	Role	Notes
2004	The Perfect Score	Guy in Truck	Uncredited
2004	Ill Fated	Jimmy	
2005	The Long Weekend	Roger	
2005	Severed	Tyler	
2007	88 Minutes	Albert Jackson	
2007	National Lampoon's Bag Boy	Phil Piedmonstein	
2011	The Big Year	Tony	
2014	Dirty Singles	Jack	
2014	Preggoland	Danny Makerman	
2014	Rusty Steel	Mike	Direct-to-video

Television
Year	Title	Role	Notes
2002	We'll Meet Again	Bobby Burke	Television film
2002	The Dead Zone	Chuck Chattsworth	Season 1, episode 13: "Destiny"
2003	John Doe	Unshaven Teenager	Episode 16: "Illegal Alien"
2003	Black Sash	Grant	Episode 4: "Date Night"
2003	Andromeda	Lt. Bowlus	2 episodes
2003	Peacemakers	Tom	Episode 3: "No Excuse"
2003	Battlestar Galactica	Billy Keikeya	Miniseries
2004–2006	Battlestar Galactica	Billy Keikeya	25 episodes
2006	Nobody's Watching	Will	Television film
2006	Days of Our Lives	Will	Uncredited; Episode #1.10432
2006	How I Met Your Mother	Will	Uncredited; Season 2, episode 7: "Swarley"
2006	Scrubs	Will	Uncredited; Season 6, episode 2: "My Best Friend's Baby's Baby and My Baby's Baby"
2008–2009	Knight Rider	Billy Morgan	Main role; 18 episodes
2009	Play the Game	David Mitchell	
2009	No Heroics	Pete	Television film
2010	Bond of Silence	Officer Haines	Television film
2011	Normal	Dr. Tatsciore	Television film
2011	Almost Heroes	Terry	Main role; 8 episodes
2011	Killer Mountain	Tyler	Television film
2012	Supernatural	Don Richardson	Season 8, episode 9: "Citizen Fang"
2013	Emily Owens M.D.	Scott	2 episodes
2013	Window Wonderland	Jake Dooley	Television film
2014	Motive	Peter Ward	Season 2, episode 8: "Angels with Dirty Faces"
2014–2015	Spun Out	Beckett Ryan	Main role; 26 episodes
2015	Surprised By Love	Maxwell Gridley	Television film
2015	Once Upon a Holiday	Jack Langdon	Television film
2017	Man Seeking Woman	Guy at Head of Table	Season 3, episode 5: "Shrimp"
2017	Sun, Sand & Romance	Michael Shepard	Television film Producer
2018	Take Two	Galen Eckhart	Episode 8: "All About Ava"
2018	The Girl in the Bathtub	Paul	Television film
2018	A Godwink Christmas	Gery Conover	Television film
2019	The Last Bridesmaid	Kyle	Television film
2019	Holiday Hearts	Dr. Ben Tyler	Television film
2020	Wedding Every Weekend	Nate	Television film
2020	Christmas by Starlight	Will Holt	Television film Writer
2021	Turner & Hooch	Grady Garland	Recurring role; 6 episodes
2021	The Santa Stakeout	Ryan	Television film
2021	The Nine Kittens of Christmas	Mason	Television film
2021	An Unexpected Christmas	N/A	Television film Writer
2021	Christmas at Castle Hart	N/A	Television film Writer
2022	Love, Classified	Bartender	Television film (Uncredited)
2022	Moriah's Lighthouse	N/A	Television film Writer; Executive Producer
2022	Dating the Delaneys	Michael Taylor	Television film
2022	Three Wise Men and a Baby	Stephan Brenner	Television film Writer
2023	The Cases of Mystery Lane	Alden Case	Television film
2023	Magic in Mistletoe	Harry	Hallmark Movie
2024	Falling Together	Mark	Hallmark Movie
2024	Three Wiser Men and a Boy	Stephen Brenner	Hallmark Movie
2025	Christmas at the Catnip Cafe	Dr. Ben Kane	Hallmark Movie
2026	All's Fair in Love and Mahjong	Ben	Hallmark Movie
