= Gods Lake (disambiguation) =

Gods Lake or God's Lake may refer to:

== Fiction ==
- Animism: The Gods' Lake TV series and game

== Populated places ==
- Gods Lake, Manitoba
- Gods Lake Narrows, Manitoba

== Administrative areas ==
- God's Lake 23, Manitoba, an Indian Reserve
- God's Lake Old Growth White Pine Forest Conservation Reserve, Ontario
- God's Lake Southeast Of Community, Manitoba, an Indian Reserve

== Water features ==
- Gods Lake (Alberta)
- Gods Lake, a lake located northeast of Lake Winnipeg
- Gods Lake (Swan Lake), a small lake located west of Lake Winnipeg
- God's Lake (Ontario)
