= Total Frat Movie =

2016 comedy film directed by Warren P. Sonoda

- Film poster
- Directed by: Warren P. Sonoda
- Written by: Stephen Fromkin; Sacha Pavlovic; Dillon Cheverere; David Carter Ruff
- Produced by: Robert Wertheimer
- Starring: Justin Deeley; Alex House; Steven Yaffee; Rebecca Dalton; Tom Green
- Cinematography: Samy Inayeh
- Edited by: Aden Bahadori
- Production companies: Emerge Entertainment; Grandex Productions
- Distributed by: Gravitas Ventures
- Release date: September 23, 2016
- Running time: 93 minutes
- Countries: United States; Canada
- Language: English

Total Frat Movie is a 2016 comedy film directed by Warren P. Sonoda and starring Justin Deeley, Alex House, Steven Yaffee, Rebecca Dalton and Tom Green.

== Plot ==
Three years after his fraternity's chapter is revoked, Charlie Martin searches for redemption by attempting to get the frat reinstated, but he needs 15 new members by the end of rush week. One problem: rush starts in 24 hours.

== Cast ==
- Justin Deeley as Charlie Martin
- Alex House as Billy Taylor
- Steven Yaffee as John 'Douchenozzle' MacGyver
- Rebecca Dalton as Katie Littleton
- Tom Green as Dean Kravitz
- Nick Bateman as Alexander 'AJ' Chesterfield
- Jamie Johnston as Alex Watson
