= Mutant World =

- Film poster
- Written by: Matthew Campagna
- Directed by: David Winning
- Starring: Holly Deveaux; Ashanti; Kim Coates
- Music by: Mitch Lee
- Countries of origin: Canada, United States
- Original language: English

Production
- Executive producers: Chad Oakes; Michael Frislev
- Producer: Petros Danabassis
- Cinematography: Neil Cervin
- Editor: Bridget Durnford
- Running time: 83 minutes
- Production company: Nomadic Pictures

Original release
- Release: 27 September 2014

Mutant World (French release: Independence Wars) is a 2014 Canadian-American neo-sci-fi western horror television film directed by David Winning and written by Matt Campagna, produced by Nomadic Pictures on behalf of SyFy. The film follows the adventures of a group of doomsday preppers who emerge from an elaborate bunker a decade after a meteor wipes out civilization, finding the world overrun by mutants. Shot in Alberta, the film stars Holly Deveaux as the leader of the preppers exploring their new world, Ashanti as a mysterious stranger who shadows them, and Kim Coates as the original leader who saved the handful of people ten years earlier.

== Plot ==
In the not too distant future, doomsday prepper Marcus King has been preparing for the end of the world for many years. One day, while tracking the skies with his son Geoff, they discover a massive, potentially planet-destroying meteor hurtling towards Earth. Worse still, the meteor looks likely to hit a nuclear reactor. There is little time, but King quickly organizes his small group of highly militarized group and most of them make it to their bunker, a former missile silo, before the impact event, including Geoff and his daughter Melissa, but not her boyfriend Caden, nor himself.

Ten years later, life has continued for those inside the bunker but food and medicine are getting low. After a disturbance outside affects the power in the bunker, the survivors find themselves in trouble. Their only solution is to send a group of people outside into the unknown world outside to fix the problem. After a brief power struggle underground, a team consisting of new leader Melissa, Geoff, Rogan, Shaina, and Tyler ventures out, shadowed by a woman in black. After fixing the power, they explore and salvage. Outside, the air is safe to breathe: people can live outside again. However, they soon also discover that humans who were exposed to the meteorite's radiation have been mutated and become cannibals. One by one, they are injured by the mutants. After Geoff is shot in the leg with an arrow, the group seeks refuge.

The team encounters a man who leads them to sanctuary in the form of survivors living in a town resembling something out of the Old West where they meet Sheriff Elmore Leonard. Exploring further, they discover that when the sun goes down, the survivors turn into mutants, among them Caden, who taunts Melissa as he attacks. The woman in black, Sadie, called Preacher, shows great experience with fighting mutants, and reveals her knowledge of non-mutated survivors elsewhere. She participates in the combat that ensues, but does not survive. As Sadie did before her, Melissa takes on the mantle of Preacher in the search for survivors and sanctuary.

== Cast ==
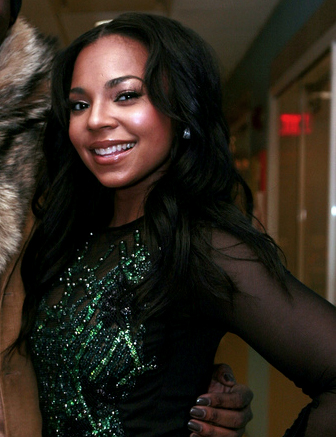
Ashanti in 2012.

- Holly Deveaux as Melissa King
- Ashanti as The Preacher
- Kim Coates as Marcus King
- Amber Marshall as Nicole
- Jason Cermak as Geoff King
- Megan Tracz as Xeni
- Greg Lawson as Sheriff Elmore Leonard
- David LeReaney as Mads
- Jesse Lipscombe as Francois
- John DeSantis as The Giant
- Sydney Bell as Beverly
- Ted Brown as The Postman
- Kelly Christie as The Gatekeeper
- Lisa Forbes as The Stylist
- Karen Hanna as The Kindergarten Teacher
- Anne Hawthorne as Nicole's Mom / Serafina
- Mark Krysko as Caden
- Roger LeBlanc as Rogan
- Graham Scott Littlefield as Tyler
- Gary Parkinson as The Cueball
- Gail Tremblay as The Catlady
- Kofi Wiafe as The Rustler
- Lara Zaluski as Shaina

== Production ==
=== Background ===
Mutant World is a production of Calgary-based Nomadic Pictures, founded in 1995 by executive producers Chad Oakes and Mike Frislev, who "gleefully" called Mutant World a B movie, which he defined as "big ideas brought to the screen with very little money". Director David Winning, who regularly divides his time between Los Angeles and Calgary, having carved out "a long history as a gun-for-hire director with a penchant for guiding actors" through "B-movie terrain", (Note: For example, Bruce Dern in Swamp Devil, Robert Englund in Black Swarm, and Kevin Sorbo in Something Beneath.) offered a slightly different take on making them: "It's so tongue-in-cheek. You get into it and laugh and think 'this is ridiculous' and then get pulled back into it. Which is the whole point of it when you have no money and are trying to stretch the story as much as you can, which is implausible to begin with."

=== Writing ===
Mutant World was the third television movie for SyFy written by Toronto-based screenwriter Matt Campagna, all of which have followed a certain formula, as Eric Volmers points out: "take a supernatural, action-packed premise, add an established character actor ... and shoot it all cheaply and efficiently". (Note: Campagna's past Syfy films featured Bruce Dern, Robert Englund, and Kevin Sorbo.) The film's working title at the start of principal photography was Fallout Asylum. It is suggested that Campagna made an effort "to ensure that many of the ideas in Mutant World have a grounding in real science", apart from the film's radioactive mutant premise.

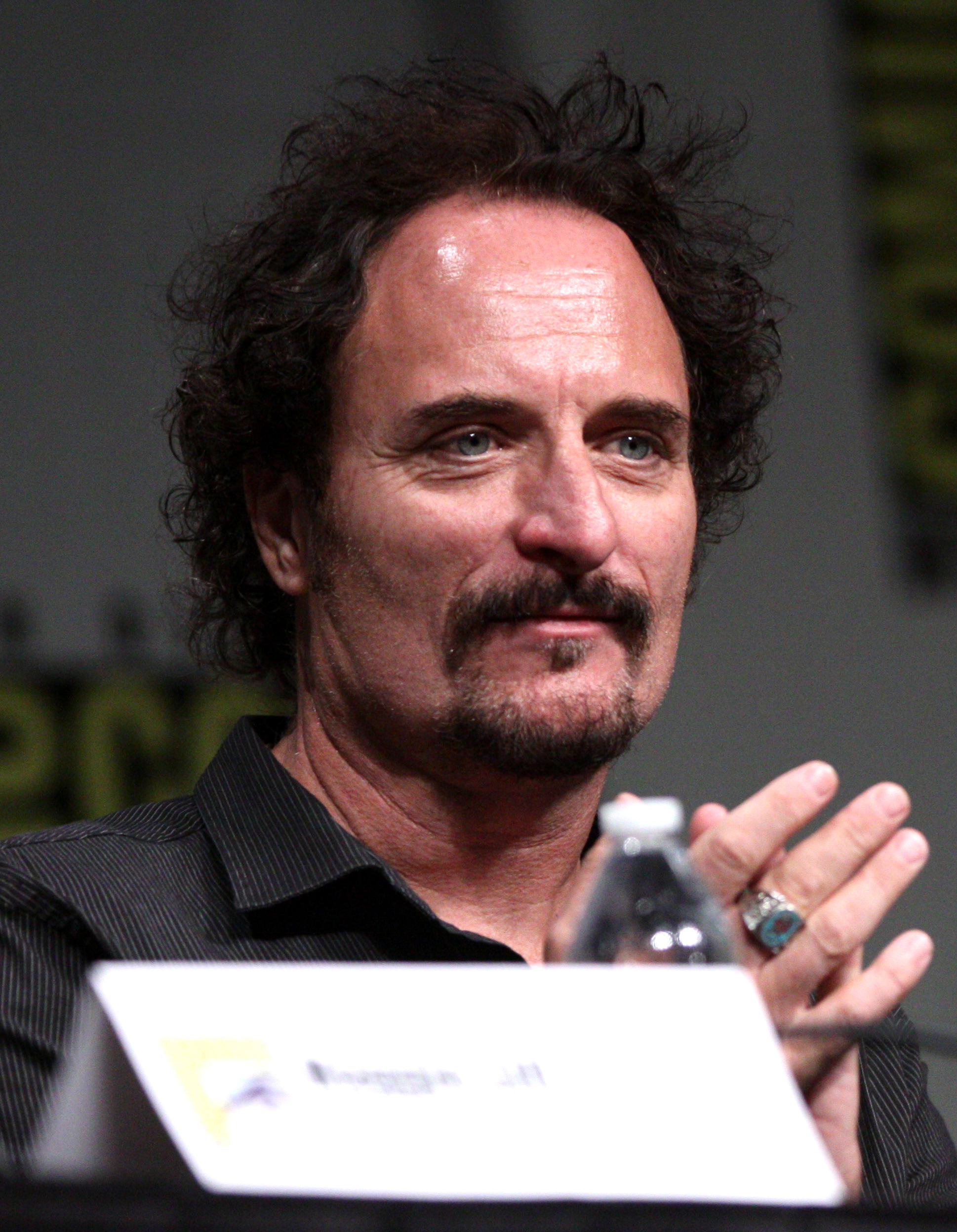
Kim Coates in 2012.

=== Casting and characters ===
The "star power" of Mutant World comes from Sons of Anarchy actor Kim Coates, whose role in the film is "small but meaty", requiring only three days for his scenes. He was asked to star in the film by its Calgary producers, Chad Oakes and Mike Frislev, who had a past relationship with the actor after casting him in 2008's coming-of-age drama 45 R.P.M., but he insisted on changes to the script to give his character "a more poignant arc." Coates took the character seriously, keen on probing "the strange mind of a paranoid doomsday prepper."

He's very savvy, very tough. We've seen this. It's in reality shows. There are zany people out there who are preparing for the apocalypse. They have their guns and their gasoline and are bunkered down and ready, which kind of freaks me out. But this guy is like that. And, wouldn't you know it, a comet is two hours away.

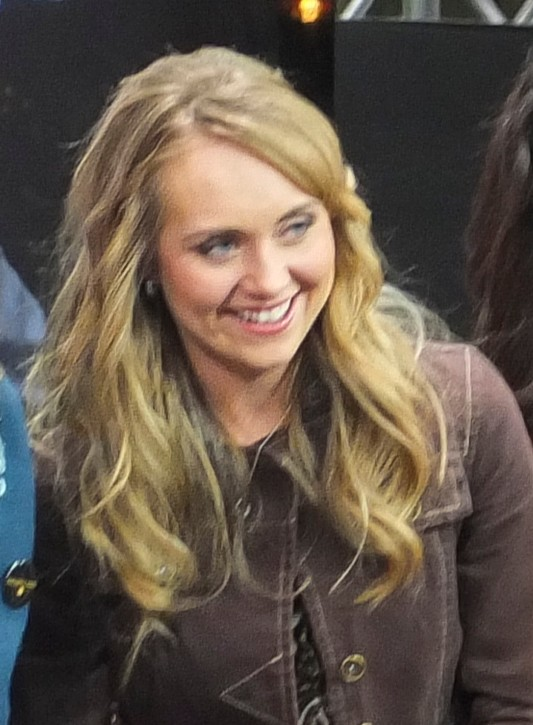
Amber Marshall in 2015.

The project gave a few local actors a chance to play against type: Amber Marshall, who plays Heartland's earnest Amy Fleming, plays Nicole, "a scrappy, machine gun-toting medic", while David LeReaney, a veteran theatre actor and dialect coach, plays "an action-ready military man", and was an actor David Winning had been wanting to work with "forever": "I wanted to cast him in things when I started out in movies. He was always 'Calgary's actor' — he was always the guy you wanted to get." Jason Cermak is a Drayton Valley native who won an Alberta Film and Television Award the previous year for his role in the family drama Common Chord. He admitted that being paid to "run around with guns" was "pretty cool", but also suggested that Mutant World has character arcs that are deeper than they initially appear, speaking of his own character, Geoff King:

Ten years takes a toll on him ... He's burdened with this responsibility of keeping what's left of humanity alive. He becomes quite introverted. His journey in coming to the surface, aside from just being attacked by mutants and such, he has to find himself again and try to answer questions about what his future looks like.

His onscreen sister, Holly Deveaux, whose character Melissa is "a take-charge kind who is both handy with a gun and has a curious habit of breaking into sorrowful song", likewise said it is empowering to play a female character who "kicks ass": "I always played Lara Croft on my computer, so this is a dream come alive for me ... I get to wear a thigh holster and everything. I took way too many selfies."

Mutant World was also the feature film début for 17-year-old Irricana native Megan Tracz (Xeni), who was introduced to acting at the age of ten when she joined the Airdrie Family Theatre.

=== Crew ===
Campagna wrote on his blog about having the chance to work alongside people from the props department on Chronicles of Riddick, "as well as a bunch of folks who worked on Nolan's new film" (Interstellar), and "at least two people" who had worked on Power Rangers movies" (in another entry, he names David Winning as having directed the sequel to Power Rangers).

=== Filming ===
Mutant World was shot over fifteen days in Calgary (the old Telus Science Centre served as the bunker's interiors), Strathmore, and the CL Ranch near Springbank. During principal photography, Coates sounded skeptical about whether it was possible to shoot this kind of film in so short a time: "What worries me is we're taking less and less and less time to shoot. When I read the script and (heard) it was going to be done in 15 days, I lost my s — t." Matt Campagna described it as "a pretty wild time," and was happy to have been given "the gift of gorgeous snowfalls ... You can't even pay for that kind of production value!" The ability to adapt quickly and "go with the flow" is a key requirement for low-budget horror films, a world that the Campagna knew very well, as he wrote in his blog: "Between doing some on-the-fly re-writes, running a camera, animating graphics, and supervising visual effects, I've actually had some time to do a bit of directing".

=== Music ===
Campagna is "good friends" with the Canadian band Four Letter World, who provided the song for the end credits.

== Release ==
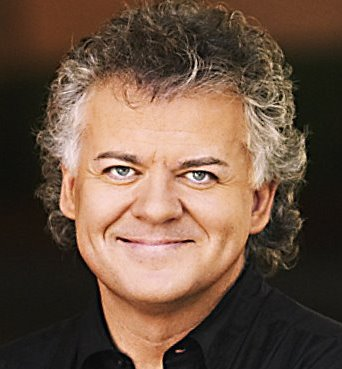
David Winning

Mutant World received a theatrical premiere at the Calgary International Film Festival on 28 September 2014, at the Globe Cinema, where it sold out. Eric Volmers describes the event as having a fitting "late-night vibe", with zombies prowling the red carpet and posing with actors. "It seemed three-quarters of the Alberta film industry was on hand."

David Winning recalled that his first red-carpet film premiere in Calgary took place twenty years earlier, with Killer Image, an Alberta-shot 1992 thriller starring Michael Ironside and M. Emmet Walsh; as well, his 1987 film Storm was screened at the Globe Cinema, and Winning said being there again seemed "very weird".

=== Broadcasting ===
In the US, the Mutant World aired on SyFy on 8 November 2014, and in Canada on Super Channel in January 2015, running into February.

=== Home media and streaming ===
Mutant World was released on DVD on 26 May 2015, and is available for streaming from iTunes.

== Reception ==
=== Critical response ===
Eric Volmers described Mutant World as "funny, entertaining and action-packed," occasionally recalling John Carpenter's films, like Big Trouble in Little China and Escape from New York. Chris Shalom compared it to World Gone Wild (1987), calling it "a spiritual companion in many ways": both have the same "watered-down, goofied-up" Road Warrior plot, both "shoehorn in a recognizable singer-actor" (Adam Ant and Ashanti), and "both will have the same destiny ... the few who embrace Mutant World will cherish it."

The tale of gun-toting survivors on an excursion through a barren post-apocalyptic world (or, as we Albertans call it, home) is probably most interesting as a contemporary example of a sub-genre that had an almost exclusive synergy with the 80s ... high-camp sci-fi Westerns that followed Star Wars and Road Warrior ...

Shalom goes on to list a few of those "singular works": Radioactive Dreams, Buckaroo Banzai, and Hell Comes to Frogtown, further noting that, unlike the Eighties films, Mutant World is "delightfully female-centric, despite the largely male creative team", while at the same time, gender is not central to the film:

In fact, the film simultaneously upholds and subverts the Reagan-era Hollywood theme of father-son continuity. The moment of apocalypse ... coincides with the loss of protagonist Melissa's father ... But Melissa's journey leads her to the eventual embodiment not of her father, but of the mysterious Preacher, a motorcycle-straddling, steel-whip-cracking Ashanti in leather and a cowboy hat ... a key bonding scene between her and Holly Deveaux's Melissa, steeped in aggressive Christian overtones, evinces a curious and appealing gravity ... It's a clichéd scene that's instantly defamiliarized by its characters' genders, and it's a fine showcase for both Deveaux and director David Winning.

Having said all this, Shalom finds Ashanti's acting highly lacking, and faults Mutant World for not being shot on film: it "looks bad, and it looks worse than it would have looked in the '80s", and being made for television "means that a number of TV-movie conventions, most notably the need to open fast and big, strain the film's storytelling." But for its target audience and the people who made it, none of this matters: "Mutant World is exactly what it needs to be. The action's constant, the characters are colourful, the nurses are sexy and the mutant blood splatters...what more could you ask for?"

Robyn Andrew gives the film 2 out of 5 stars, complaining that despite an interesting premise, Mutant World unfortunately falls short due to "shaky acting and cinematography," combined with "weak dialogue and poor special effects"; the film is "almost unbearable to watch." Despite this, it also has a "goofy, amusing charm" if the viewer "does not take the story too seriously," making for entertaining viewing. The SyFy network "must be admired for taking risks and providing opportunities for up and coming writers, directors, and actors. Plenty of action, blood, and gore cover up most of the plot holes, and at the very least provide a good laugh." Jim McLellan feels the film's potential is not at all realized, "because there is hardly any aspect that is not badly botched, right from the start:" Coates, the only real "name" in the cast, is "barely in the film," in a bait-and-switch; the script is "just terrible" as a quick mission "spirals off into a jolly road-trip, with no apparent regard for the people back in the bunker", and: "there's no explanation provided" to explain why "some people are totally mutated, some are only mutated at night(!), and others, like the Preacher, are apparently entirely untroubled". McLellan goes on to criticize Ashanti's acting, the "poorly-choreographed fight" establishing Melissa as the leader, and how "no-one appears to have aged or been changed in the slightest by the passage of a decade". Like Shalom, he did "somewhat appreciate the element of role-reversal found here, with the most bad-ass roles given to the actresses. However, good intentions are never enough to overcome execution as horribly flawed as we see here."

=== Audience response ===
Winning said the audience at the sold-out Calgary premiere were "laughing and whooping it up"; he added: "It was nice to see people getting energized by it."

=== Accolades ===
Awards

- Alberta Media Production Industries Association (AMPIA) • Rosie Award, Best Overall Sound (Drama Over 30 Minutes): Frank Laratta, Ron Osiowy (2015)
- WorldFest-Houston International Film Festival • Gold Remi Award: Best Directing (2015)

Nominations

- Alberta Media Production Industries Association (AMPIA) • Rosie Award, Best Dramatic Made-For-TV Movie or Mini-Series • Best Make-Up Artist • Best Original Musical Score (Drama Over 30 Minutes) (2015)
- Calgary International Film Festival • Best Canadian Feature (2014)
