= Play the Game (film) =

Romantic comedy film written and directed by Marc Fienberg

- Play the Game poster
- Directed by: Marc Fienberg
- Written by: Marc Fienberg
- Produced by: A. Charles Funai; Jim Rose; Eva Gordon
- Starring: Andy Griffith; Paul Campbell; Liz Sheridan; Doris Roberts; Marla Sokoloff
- Cinematography: Gavin Kelly
- Edited by: Kimberly Generous White
- Music by: Jim Latham
- Production company: Slowhand Cinema
- Distributed by: E1 Entertainment
- Release date: August 28, 2009
- Running time: 105 minutes
- Country: United States
- Language: English
- Box office: $659,483

Play the Game is a 2009 romantic comedy film starring Andy Griffith, Paul Campbell, Liz Sheridan, Doris Roberts, and Marla Sokoloff, written and directed by Marc Fienberg. This was Andy Griffith's last film credit; he died on July 3, 2012. The film received attention for containing a sex scene between Sheridan and Griffith.

== Plot ==
Play the Game tells the story of a young ladies' man, David, who teaches his lonely, widowed grandfather how to play the dating game, while playing his best games to win over Julie, the girl of his dreams. But as David's "foolproof" techniques prove to be anything but in his pursuit of Julie, the same techniques quickly transform Grandpa into the Don Juan of the retirement community. Slowly, the teacher becomes the student, and Grandpa must teach David how to win back the love of his life.

== Cast ==
- Paul Campbell as David Mitchell
- Andy Griffith as Grandpa Joe
- Marla Sokoloff as Julie Larabee
- Liz Sheridan as Edna Gordon
- Doris Roberts as Rose Sherman
- Clint Howard as Dick
- Rance Howard as Mervin
- Geoffrey Owens as Rob Marcus
- Juliette Jeffers as Carri

== About the Director ==
Marc Fienberg, the director and producer of the film, was born in Chicago, Illinois on May 31st, 1970. He moved to Santa Monica with his wife, the co-producer, Eva Gordon where they have four kids: Casey, Lilah, Abby, and Ari. Other works of Fienberg include his script of the movie Altitude which he sold and is currently being produced, as well as being the author of his own book, "Dad's Great Advice for Teens."

== Soundtrack ==
No.	Title	Writer(s)	Length
1.	"East Coast Leaves"	Marty Wereski	4:45
2.	"Lie"	Beth Thornley	4:17
3.	"Dark Blue"	Andrew McMahon	4:09
4.	"Hum Along"	Andrew Volpe	4:20
5.	"Race You"	Elizabeth Ziman	2:56
6.	"Can't You See"	Marty Wereski	4:03
7.	"Pretty Girls"	Ethan Gold	3:41
8.	"Sound of Your Voice"	Kevin Hearn	3:17
9.	"Gorgeous Behaviour"	Jacob Lind and Erik Sunbring	4:33
10.	"Your Darkest Eyes"	Rocky Votolato	3:43
11.	"One Good Song"	Emi Meyer	4:04
12.	"Best In Me"	Dan Koch	4:21
13.	"All I Want Is You"	Stephen Lang, Jamie Dunlap, and Scott Nickoley	2:25
14.	"Don't Rush Me"	Michael Rossback	4:01
15.	"You Don't Wanna Know"	Chelsea Williams	3:52
16.	"Cactus Flower"	John Gold	2:44
17.	"Never Not Want You"	Dan Ferrari	3:30
18.	"Wonderful Crazy"	Scott Krippayne	3:29
19.	"Must Have Done Something Right"	Matt Thiessen	3:19
20.	"Laundry Girl"	Andrew Volpe	6:24

== Release ==
Play the Game had a theatrical release. In its opening weekend, it grossed $51,197. Play the Game grossed at total of $659,483.

=== Home media ===
On August 28, 2009, Play the Game was released on DVD by E1 Entertainment.

== Reception ==
On the review aggregator website Rotten Tomatoes, 29% of 31 critics' reviews are positive. The website's consensus reads: "Andy Griffith is his usually likable self, but he's stranded in a middling comedy that's surprisingly tasteless and poorly crafted." The review aggregator website Metacritic gave the film 35 out of 100 indicating generally unfavorable reviews.

=== Critical response ===
Dennis Harvey of Variety wrote in his review: "The comedy’s broad perfs, predictable story beats and pro but characterless packaging have a smallscreen feel." Roger Ebert wrote in his review: "It’s The Andy Griffith Show meets Seinfeld in the sack in Play the Game, which shows Andy is not too old to star in a sex comedy, I guess."

The Associated Press in its review via The Hollywood Reporter wrote: "Griffith certainly gives it his all, and it’s a novel experience listening to him deliver lines like "Grandpa’s horny and he wants to have fun!" But despite the veteran actor’s good-humored willingness to have fun, the role comes as a real letdown after his fine work in the recent Waitress. Rachel Saslow of The Washington Post wrote in her review: "Andy's definitely not in Mayberry anymore." Shaula Clark of The Phoenix wrote in her review: "This is the kind of movie you stagger out of in a stunned trance. Actually, it's the kind of movie that must've been conceived and financed in a stunned trance as well."
