= Frank Sheridan (pianist) =

American classical pianist (1898–1962)

- Born: May 1, 1898; New York, U.S.
- Died: April 15, 1962 (aged 63); New York, U.S.
- Occupation: Classical pianist
- Children: Liz Sheridan

Frank Sheridan (May 1, 1898 – April 15, 1962) was an American classical pianist. Sheridan was a student of Harold Bauer and himself a respected teacher. He was the father of actress Liz Sheridan.

== Biography ==
Sheridan was born in 1897 or 1898 in New York City to an Irish father and a German mother. He started piano lessons with a neighborhood teacher at the age of 7 before studying under Louis Stillman, Rafael Joseffy and Max Liebling. He made his professional debut in 1918.
