= Juliette Jeffers =

American actress

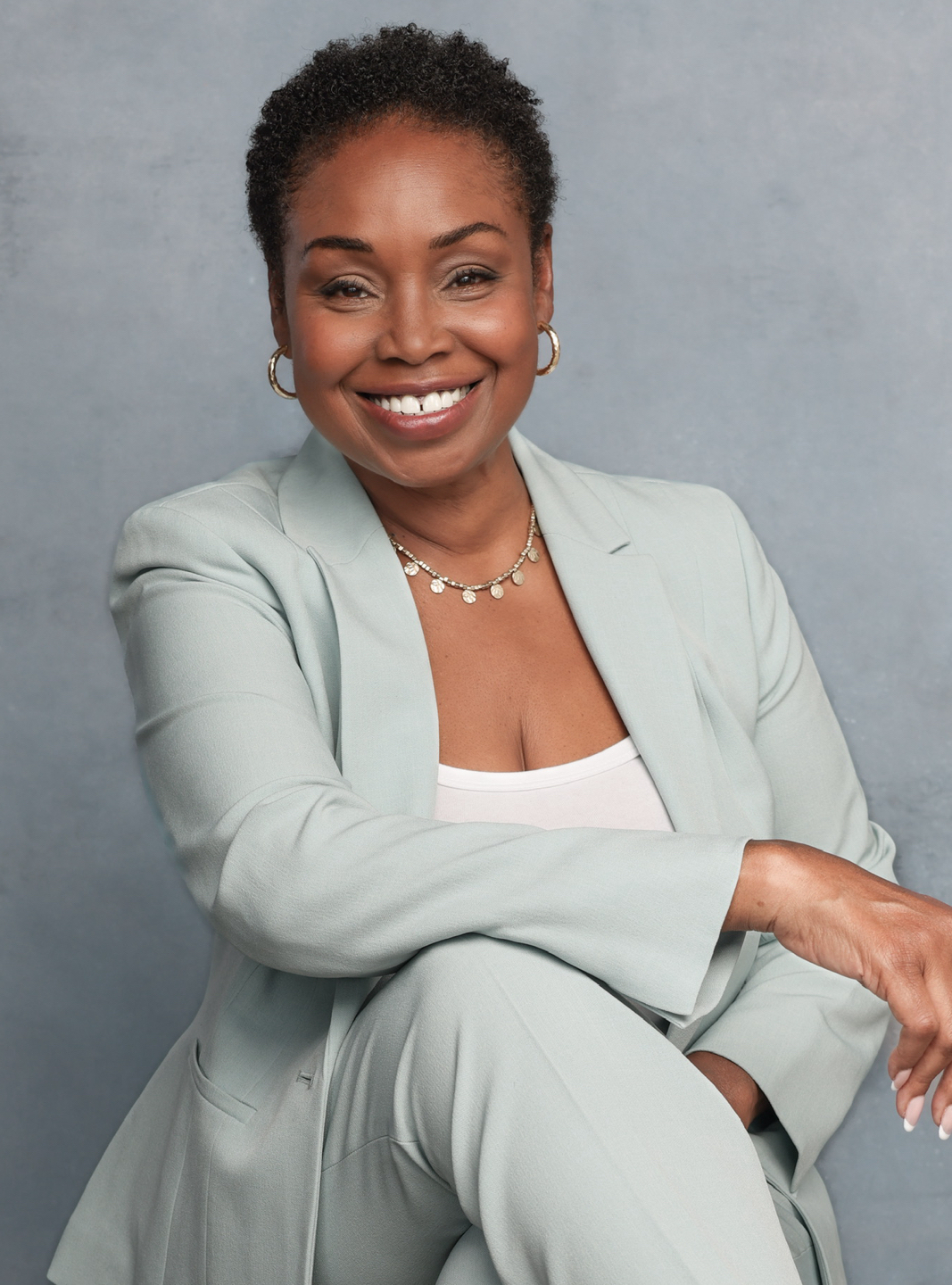
- Occupations: Actress, writer
- Years active: 1992–present
- Known for: TV, film, commercials, theatre
- Website: juliettejeffers.com

Juliette Jeffers is a Caribbean–American actress of St. Kitts and Nevis descent. Her work spans television, film, national commercial campaigns, and theater. She currently stars in recurring guest roles on The Residence, portraying White House painter Angie Huggins, and on Tulsa King, playing Angie Mitchell, the mother of Tyson.

== Early life ==
Juliette Jeffers began her artistic training at the High School of Performing Arts in Manhattan. She later earned a degree in Languages from Hofstra University, which included academic programs in both Spain and France. After graduating, Jeffers moved to Los Angeles to pursue a career in acting and has since worked extensively in theatre, television, and film for over twenty-five years.

== Career ==
Jeffers moved to Los Angeles in the early 1990s and guest-starred on several TV shows such as Fresh Prince of Bel Air, Martin, Murder She Wrote and Silk Stalkings. She also appeared on ER and Grey's Anatomy. In film, Jeffers appeared in The Surgeon, starring Malcolm McDowell and more recently played Geoffrey Owens' wife in Play the Game starring Andy Griffith and Doris Roberts. She was nominated alongside John Leguizamo and Colin Quinn for a Drama Desk Award for the Off Broadway performance of her solo show Batman and Robin in the Boogie Down. Jeffers has appeared in over 50 TV commercials.

== Filmography ==
=== Film ===
| Year | Title | Role | Notes |
|---|---|---|---|
| 1995 | Exquisite Tenderness | Lisa Wilson | |
| 1997 | Quiet Days in Hollywood | Police Officer | |
| 2002 | Essence of King & Queen | Alicia | Short |
| 2002 | Bug | DJ | |
| 2003 | Biker Boyz | Waitress | |
| 2005 | Constellation | Clerk | |
| 2005 | Gift for the Living | Young Carrie Mae | Short |
| 2007 | Nobel Son | Claire | |
| 2009 | Play the Game | Carrie Marcus | |
| 2013 | 95 Decibels | Nancy Speech Therapist | Short |
| 2013 | Big Girl | Saleswoman | Short |
| 2014 | Gun Hill | Lucy | TV movie |
| 2015 | The Meddler | Coughing Woman in Hospital | |
| 2017 | Lemon | Cousin June | |
| 2018 | Morir de Amor | Lucia | |
| 2020 | Last Wish | Pauline Luck | Short |
| 2020 | Noise in the Middle | Zandra | |
| 2021 | I Just Wish You Told Me | Barbara | Short |
| 2021 | Aftermath | Dr. Sasner | |
| 2022 | Her False Self | Scarlett Redmond | Short |
| 2023 | Heaven on Earth | Alicia | Short |
| 2024 | The Requiem Boogie | Jazmine | |

=== Television ===
| Year | Title | Role | Notes |
|---|---|---|---|
| 1992 | The Young and the Restless | Sally Vincent | Episode: "Episode #1.4834" |
| 1992 | The Commish | Stacy Winchester | Episode: "Sleep of the Just" |
| 1993 | Where I Live | Tina | Episode: "My Fair Forward" |
| 1993 | Dream On | Clarice | Episode: "Home Sweet Homeboy" |
| 1993 | The Fresh Prince of Bel-Air | Candace (as Spirit) | Episode: "Father of the Year" |
| 1994 | Renegade | Lynette | Episode: "South of 98" |
| 1994 | Boy Meets World | Karen Chase | Episode: "I Dream of Feeny" |
| 1994 | Saved by the Bell: The New Class | Katrina | Episode: "A Perfect Lindsay" |
| 1995 | Simon | Meryl | Episode: "Watch This" |
| 1995 | Murder, She Wrote | Vera Welles | Episode: "Big Easy Murder" |
| 1995 | Martin | Chris | Episode: "He Say, She Say" |
| 1995 | Silk Stalkings | Keisha Harris | Recurring Cast: Season 4-5 |
| 2000 | Pensacola: Wings of Gold | Julie | Episode:"Busted" |
| 2000 | Strong Medicine | Rhonda | Episode: "Performance Anxiety" |
| 2001 | Sheena | Dr. Tuli Botika | Episode: "Friendly Fire" |
| 2003 | Strong Medicine | Liposuction Patient | Episode: "Skin" |
| 2003 | Karen Sisco | Naomi | Episode: "Justice" |
| 2004 | ER | Elena Flemming | Episode: "Intern's Guide to the Galaxy" |
| 2005 | Without a Trace | Miss Laura | Episode: "Volcano" |
| 2005 | Grey's Anatomy | Mary | Episode: "Into You Like a Train" |
| 2007 | Veronica Mars | Dr. Chambliss | Episode: "There's Got to Be a Morning After Pill" |
| 2008 | Raising the Bar | Terrence's Mom | Episode: "Guatemala Gulfstream" |
| 2014-15 | Pretty the Series | Caviar Champagne | Recurring Cast: Season 4 |
| 2015 | Criminal Minds | Josephine Patterson | Episode: "Breath Play" |
| 2015 | Bones | Cheryl McMichael | Episode: "The Woman in the Whirlpool" |
| 2016 | Modern Family | Mom | Episode: "The Storm" |
| 2016 | Rizzoli & Isles | Catherine Holiday | Episode: "For Richer or Poorer" |
| 2019 | Snowfall | Karina | Episode: "Blackout" |
| 2019 | All Rise | Leigh | Episode: "Fool for Liv" |
| 2020 | Kidding | Nurse | Episode: "I'm Listening" |
| 2020 | Chicago Med | Annette Hill | Episode: "Who Should Be the Judge" |
| 2021 | Onyx Monster Mysteries | Loogaroo/Chef (voice) | Episode: "The Loogaroo" |
| 2021 | Urban Horror Series | Pauline Luck | Episode: "Last Wish" |
| 2022 | 9-1-1: Lone Star | Genevieve | Episode: "In the Unlikely Event of an Emergency" |
| 2022 | Law & Order: Organized Crime | Michelle Warner | Episode: "...Wheatley Is to Stabler" |
| 2022–25 | Tulsa King | Angie Mitchell | Recurring Cast: Season 1-2, Guest: Season 3 |
| 2023 | Found | Savannah Davis | Episode: "Missing While Interracial" |
| 2024 | Law & Order | Cassandra Matthis | Episode: "The Meaning of Life" |
| 2025 | The Residence | Angie Huggins | Recurring Cast |
| 2025 | FBI: Most Wanted | Kay Ball | Episode: "The Circle Game" |

=== Theater ===
- 2010 – Batman and Robin in the Boogie Down – Solo Show – Stage Left Studio – Off Broadway
- 2010 – Train to 2010 – Paulina – Crossroads Theatre – New Brunswick, NJ
- 2008 – Chocolate Match.com – Solo Show – Elephant Theatre Hollywood
- 2005 – Ah Ha Moments; Butterscotch & Fudge – Isa – Complex Theatre – Hollywood
- 2002 – What I Did for Love – Journalist – McCadden Place Theater, Hollywood
- 1995 – Cementville – Lessa – Theatre Geo – Hollywood
- 1993 – High Hopes and Heavy Sweatshirts – Theatre Geo – Hollywood

== Awards and honors ==
- 2013 – The Bronx Council on the Arts – Batman and Robin in the Boogie Down – Excellence in Acting – Result – Won
- 2011 – Drama Desk Award – Batman and Robin in the Boogie Down – Outstanding Solo Performance – Result – Nominated
- 2006 – NAACP Theatre Award – Ah Ha Moments; Butterscotch and Fudge – Best Lead Female –Local – Result – Nominated
- 2004 – NAACP Theatre Awards – Batman and Robin in the Boogie Down – Best Play – Local – Result – Nominated

== Writer ==
- 2025 – Pan Gyul – Pre-production, Short film
- 2010 – Batman and Robin in the Boogie Down
- 2008 – Chocolate Match.com
- 2005 – Ah Ha Moments; Legacy of Love – Complex Theatre, Hollywood
