= The Phantoms =

- Written by: Andrew Wreggitt
- Directed by: Sudz Sutherland
- Starring: Joy Tanner; Holly Deveaux; Wesley MacInnes; Tyler Johnston; Wendel Meldrum
- Country of origin: Canada
- Original language: English

Production
- Producers: Rick LeGuerrier and Timothy M. Hogan,
- Cinematography: Suds Sutherland
- Running time: 98 minutes

Original release
- Network: CBC Television
- Release: November 18, 2012

The Phantoms is a 2012 Canadian film, produced by Dream Street Pictures, based on the true story of the 2008 Boys in Red bus crash in Bathurst, New Brunswick. The film aired on CBC Television on November 18, 2012.

== Reception ==
Family members of some of the victims were critical of the film.

== Awards ==
In 2013, it narrowly defeated Animism: The Gods' Lake in the 13–17 category of the Shaw Rocket Fund's RocketPrize. In 2014 The Phantoms won an International Emmy Kids Award for Best Kids TV Movie/Mini-Series.
