= Spun Out =

- Genre: Sitcom
- Created by: Jeff Biederman; Brent Piaskoski; Brian K. Roberts
- Starring: Dave Foley; Paul Campbell; Rebecca Dalton; Al Mukadam; Holly Deveaux; J. P. Manoux; Darcy Michael
- Country of origin: Canada
- No. of seasons: 2
- No. of episodes: 26

Production
- Executive producers: Andrew Barnsley; Jeff Biederman; Brent Piaskoski; Brian K. Roberts
- Production company: Project 10 Productions

Original release
- Network: CTV
- Release: March 7, 2014 – October 3, 2015

Spun Out is a Canadian television sitcom created by Jeff Biederman, Brent Piaskoski and Brian K. Roberts for CTV. It premiered on March 6, 2014 and ended on October 3, 2015, with a total of 26 episodes over the course of two seasons.

== Premise ==
The series stars Dave Foley as Dave Lyons, the head of DLPR, a public relations firm staffed with people "who can spin everybody's problems but their own". The cast also includes Paul Campbell, Rebecca Dalton, Al Mukadam, Holly Deveaux, J. P. Manoux and Darcy Michael.

== Story ==
=== First season ===
Episode 7, titled "Middle Aged Men in the Hall", featured guest appearances by all of Foley's Kids in the Hall colleagues — Bruce McCulloch, Mark McKinney, Scott Thompson and Kevin McDonald — as his former high school friends in a Goth group who visit Dave to demand that he honor a suicide pact that they had made in their youth.

=== Second season ===
The second season finished filming on December 5, 2014. A sneak preview of the program's season premiere was slated to air on February 1, 2015 after CTV's broadcast of Super Bowl XLIX, with the full season run slated to air beginning in March 2015.

However, on January 26, as a direct response to J. P. Manoux's arrest on voyeurism charges, CTV put the program on hiatus "indefinitely" and pulled the show from all streaming platforms. Manoux appeared in all 13 episodes, making it impossible for the network to simply air a shortened run of the series by excluding his episodes. The post-Super Bowl slot was reassigned to the season premiere of MasterChef Canada.

The network later clarified that the series was not cancelled, but would eventually air. According to network executive Phil King, "I think it’s wildly unfair that you have a whole cast of people who put their livelihood into this and we’re not going to see this because someone did something inappropriate." CTV later announced the second season of Spun Out would begin airing July 14, 2015. The premiere featured a guest appearance by comedian Russell Peters.

While there was never an official announcement of the show's cancellation, in August 2015 Foley took another full-time acting job on the American sitcom Dr. Ken, signalling the de facto demise of Spun Out. By that time the voyeurism charges against Manoux had been dropped, although he still faced charges of mischief to property. Manoux was eventually found guilty of this lesser charge in early 2017.

== Cast ==
=== Main ===
- Dave Foley as Dave Lyons, the head of DLPR
- Paul Campbell as Beckett Ryan, a newly hired copywriter
- Rebecca Dalton as Stephanie Lyons, Dave's daughter and DLPR employee
- Holly Deveaux as Abby Hayes, Beckett's ex-girlfriend and roommate
- Al Mukadam as Nelson Abrams, Beckett's friend and DLPR employee
- J. P. Manoux as Bryce, Dave's executive assistant
- Darcy Michael as Gordon Woolmer, a DLPR employee with an odd personality

=== Recurring and guest stars ===
- Tricia Helfer as Claudia, Dave's ex-wife and Stephanie's mother
- The Kids in the Hall as Dave's high school goth friends
- Jason Priestley as Jacob Milton, Dave's friend and wingman
- Emma Hunter in a recurring role as Daisy, a waitress
- Jadyn Wong in a recurring role as Esther, an intern

== Episodes ==
=== Series overview ===
Season	Episodes	Originally released	
Season	Episodes	First released	Last released
1	13	March 6, 2014	May 23, 2014
2	13	July 14, 2015	October 3, 2015

=== Season 1 (2014) ===
No. overall	No. in series	Title	Directed by	Written by	Original release date	Prod. code
1	1	"Egg Salad"	Brian K. Roberts	Jeff Biederman and Brent Piaskoski	March 6, 2014	101
In the opener of this comedy following employees at public relations-firm DLPR, struggling writer Beckett Ryan gets a job at the firm thanks to a recommendation from his friend (and current DLPR employee) Nelson. But he messes things up with a big client and puts the firm's reputation in jeopardy. Guest appearance: Mark Wilson
2	2	"Parental Indiscretion"	Brian K. Roberts	Mike McPhaden	March 7, 2014	104
Stephanie meddles in the relationship between Dave and his ex-wife. Meanwhile, Nelson exposes a secret about Bryce; and Abby buys a storage locker that's full of items she hopes are worth money. Guest appearance: Tricia Helfer
3	3	"Unauthorized"	Brian K. Roberts	Darrin Rose	March 14, 2014	107
Beckett works with his favorite writer, who's about to launch his new book. But he turns out to be a bad influence on his literary idol. Meanwhile, Dave thinks that Gordon's unusual working process will get him fired; and Stephanie grows weary of Nelson putting up unflattering photos of her on social-networking sites. Guest appearance: Will Sasso
4	4	"Stalkblocker"	Brian K. Roberts	Dan Redican	March 21, 2014	106
Beckett has a big fan, but Abby and Nelson think she's obsessed with him; Dave helps Stephanie improve her small-talk skills; and Gordon presents Dave with knitted gifts in return for a compliment he received. Guest appearance: Lauren Ash
5	5	"Gaycation"	Brian K. Roberts	Jeff Biederman and Brent Piaskoski	March 28, 2014	109
Nelson feels inadequate when Abby bonds with his husband. Meanwhile, Stephanie has a string of successes at work and attributes them to a lucky piece of underwear; and Bryce wants to sit in Gordon's new office chair.
6	6	"Mad About Beckett"	Brian K. Roberts	Brent Piaskoski and Jeff Biederman	April 4, 2014	102
Beckett learns that Stephanie is incapable of speaking the name of a certain body part in front of him. Meanwhile, Nelson helps Dave work through his emotions surrounding the death of a college professor; and Esther becomes a Twitter sensation, much to Bryce's dismay.
7	7	"Middle Aged Men in the Hall"	Brian K. Roberts	Barbara Haynes	April 11, 2014	113
It's Dave's 50th birthday and must deal with a pact he made with his former high school Goth friends: that they would all kill themselves if they were still dealing with a cruel world at age 50. Guest appearances: Bruce McCulloch, Kevin McDonald, Mark McKinney & Scott Thompson
8	8	"Thrill of the Chaste"	Brian K. Roberts	Barbara Haynes	April 18, 2014	105
Stephanie becomes involved with a pop singer who's also a DLPR client, launching a huge firestorm. Meanwhile, Dave finds himself caught between his clients and his family.
9	9	"Toy Stories"	Brian K. Roberts	Jeff Biederman	April 25, 2014	108
Beckett and Nelson are forced to work on a Saturday and spend the day arguing about a project they did together in elementary school. Meanwhile, Stephanie gets jealous when Dave asks Abby for help on a secret assignment.
10	10	"Daved and Confused"	Brian K. Roberts	Brent Piaskoski	May 2, 2014	103
Dave injures his back right before a meeting with a big client, so Stephanie and Nelson secretly mix pain medications into his coffee—not realizing that he was already "self-medicating" with alcohol. Meanwhile, Nelson asks Beckett to write a speech for him, but the favor ends up building resentment.
11	11	"Break Up Like Beckett"	Brian K. Roberts	Jason Belleville	May 9, 2014	111
Dave learns that his former wingman is gay. Meanwhile, Nelson and Abby address a problematic dating pattern; and Bryce helps Stephanie break up with her boyfriend. Guest appearance: Jason Priestley
12	12	"Carpoolers"	Brian K. Roberts	Jeff Biederman and Brent Piaskoski	May 16, 2014	110
Secrets come to the fore and affect Beckett and Nelson's friendship. Meanwhile, Stephanie's manners cause an altercation with a waitress; and a second-rate intern makes Dave realize how much he appreciates Bryce.
13	13	"This Is Going to Take a While"	Brian K. Roberts	Jeff Biederman and Brent Piaskoski	May 23, 2014	112
Dave tries to win the city's mayor as a client by throwing a charity casino night at the firm, but a problem with the casino permit ends up with Dave placed under house arrest. Meanwhile, Abby persuades Beckett to come clean to Stephanie about his feelings; and Nelson keeps his marriage breakup a secret.

=== Season 2 (2015) ===
No. overall	No. in series	Title	Directed by	Written by	Original release date	Prod. code
14	1	"My Brother's Speaker"	Dave Foley	Fraser Young, Nick Beaton	July 14, 2015	201
Nelson plans a giant industry showcase when his brother Ray, a club DJ, comes for a visit — but Ray may not be nearly as committed to the whole idea. Guest appearance: Russell Peters
15	2	"Under The Influencer"	Brian K. Roberts	Barbara Haynes	July 21, 2015	202
Stephanie hires Abby to promote a new drink.
16	3	"A Tale Of Two Lasagnas"	Brian K. Roberts	Jeff Biederman	July 28, 2015	203
Stephanie tries to throw a dinner party with Bryce's help.
17	4	"Downward Dirty Dog"	Brian K. Roberts	Brent Piaskoski	August 4, 2015	204
Stephanie has to work with an old sorority sister.
18	5	"The Secret Of My Ex-Wife's Success"	Brian K. Roberts	Barbara Haynes	August 11, 2015	205
Dave gives his ex-wife a lesson in PR and she gets a client that Dave wanted.
19	6	"Sexual Ceiling"	Rob Stefaniuk	Amanda Brooke Perrin and Sara Hennessey	August 18, 2015	206
Beckett starts a physical relationship with a filmmaker and finds stimulating conversation with Stephanie.
20	7	"Copblocker"	David Warry-Smith	Barbara Haynes	August 25, 2015	207
Stephanie fears her relationship is lacking in the bedroom.
21	8	"Dude Where's My Client"	Dave Foley	Fraser Young	September 1, 2015	208
After a night of drinking, the group realizes it booked a new client meeting, but has no idea who the client is.
22	9	"Dream On"	Brian K. Roberts	Brent Piaskoski	September 8, 2015	209
Stephanie reveals to Abby that she had a romantic dream about Bryce.
23	10	"Can't Buy Me Love"	Brian K. Roberts	Jeff Biederman	September 10, 2015	210
After receiving gifts from Nelson, Beckett suspects he may be hiding something.
24	11	"Political Partier"	J.P. Manoux	Kurt Smeaton	September 13, 2015	211
Beckett and Nelson must fix the image of a politician's spoiled son.
25	12	"When Beckett Met Stephie"	Brian K. Roberts	Brent Piaskoski	October 3, 2015	212
Beckett tries to tell Steph how he feels, but the timing seems to be off.
26	13	"London Culling"	Stefan Scaini	Jeff Biederman and Brent Piaskoski	October 3, 2015	213
Steph tries to take things slow with Beckett until Dave tells her she's been chosen to go to London.
