= Shaw Rocket Fund =

Canadian non-profit

Shaw Rocket Fund logo since 2013.

The Shaw Rocket Fund is a non-profit organization that funds both English and French Canadian children's television and digital programs. Headquartered in Calgary, Alberta, it is the largest private funder for Canadian kids' media for independent producers, and is one of Shaw Communications' key programs.

== History ==
The Shaw Rocket Fund was created in 1998 (known then as the Shaw Television Broadcast Fund) by Shaw Communications as a private funder of Canadian kids' TV production. In 2004, Agnes Augustin became President & CEO of the Fund. Agnes was previously a Manager and Vice President of Business Affairs for production and distribution companies, Head of Production for CMT, and an independent producer.

Shaw Communications continues to contribute to the Shaw Rocket Fund (over $200 million as of 2019), and the Shaw Rocket Fund has invested over $290 million into 1,158 programs of Canadian kids' content.

The Shaw Rocket Fund is listed as a Certified Independent Production Fund by the Canadian Radio-television and Telecommunications Commission (CRTC).

On August 18, 2025, Rogers Communications announced that they would be renewing the support of the fund until summer 2026.

== Board ==
The Shaw Rocket Fund Board consists of five industry professionals.

- Chair: Christine Shipton, former Senior Vice President of Content for Shaw Media
- Vice-Chair: Gigi Boyd, a Gemini and Leo award winning Producer ("Elijah")
- Secretary/Treasurer: Agnes Augustin, Shaw Rocket Fund President & CEO
- Director: Chethan Lakshman, Vice-President, External Affairs at Shaw Communications
- Director: Nancy Birnbaum, former CEO of Invest in Kids
- Director: Gave Lindo, head of content programming for TikTok in North America

== Advocating for Kids Media ==
The Shaw Rocket Fund is known for being vocal about the importance of quality Canadian children's programming. In CRTC hearings (2024-2025) pertaining to Canada's new broadcast framework, they have emphasized the prioritization of children's media in government decisions. In a critical state for kids' media, where children's content has been in a decline for a decade, the Rocket Fund called for funding obligations for broadcasters' programming.

== Shaw Rocket Prize ==
The Shaw Rocket Fund created the Shaw Rocket Prize in 2004 as a way to award high-quality Canadian children's programs.

The Shaw Rocket Prize was an annual award, funded by the Shaw Rocket Fund, presented to one or more Canadian television programs. It started out as one $50,000 prize, awarded to the winning program, but in 2013 it expanded to three $25,000 prizes, awarded to a winner in each of three categories (Preschool, Children ages 6–12 and Youth ages 13–17 & Family). Production companies applied for the Prize by submitting their programs online. Eligible entries are reviewed by an International Jury, made up of four to five industry professionals. Once the jury selected the finalists, another jury, made up of Canadian children, voted online for the winner. Global TV did a segment on the winners in 2014. Prime Minister Justin Trudeau and Sophie Grégoire-Trudeau introduced the 2016 winner event with a video message.

=== International Jury ===
Year	Jury Members
2005	Deirdre Brennan, Frank Dietz, Michelle Henderson, Bob Higgins, Theresa Plummer-Andrews
2006	Deirdre Brennan, Jennifer Canham, Dea Connick Perez, Frank Dietz, Theresa Plummer-Andrews
2007	Donna Andrews, Malcolm Bird, Dea Connick Perez, Estelle Hughes
2008	Finn Arnesen, Marc Buhaj, Michael Carrington, Frank Dietz, Adina Pitt
2009	Deirdre Brennan, Geoffrey Goodwin, Bob Higgins, Adina Pitt
2010	Jules Borkent, Deirdre Brennan, Rick Clodfelter, Sander Schwartz, David Levine
2011	Tim Brooke-Hunt, Michael Carrington, Joe Godwin, Nicole Keeb, Adina Pitt
2012	Andrew Beecham, Julien Borde, Jules Borkent, Layla Lewis, Larry Schwarz
2013	Evan Baily, Sarah Muller, Adina Pitt, Karen Vermeulen, Brian Wright
2014	Jules Borkent, Stephen Green, David Levine, Cecilia Persson, Alison Stewart
2016	Julien Borde, Jules Borkent, Adina Pitt, Alice Webb

=== Kids' Jury ===
The Shaw Rocket Prize Kids' Jury was made up of children from across Canada. Over the years it evolved, originally beginning with a few select schools, and expanding to include children from all of Canada in the 0-17 age group. Preschoolers 5 and under screened and vote for one of three programs suitable for their age group, as did children aged 6–12 and youth aged 13–17.

=== Nominees ===
Winners in bold

Year	Nominees
2005	**Degrassi: The Next Generation**, Franny's Feet, Poko, Shoebox Zoo
2006	**Being Ian**, Harry and his Bucket Full of Dinosaurs, Heads Up!, Naturally Sadie, Poko II
2007	**Make Some Noise**, Hope for the Future, Instant Star, The Snow Queen
2008	**Life with Derek S3**, Johnny Test S2, Roll Play
2009	**Sticks and Stones**, Fred's Head, How She Move, Instant Star
2010	**Dino Dan**, How to be Indie, In Real Life, Jimmy Two Shoes, League of Super Evil
2011	**Wingin' It S2**, dirtgirlworld, My Babysitter's a Vampire (The Movie), Survive This S2, Wibbly Pig
2012	**My Babysitter's a Vampire S1**, Justin Time, La Est La Question!, Stella and Sam S2, That's So Weird S3
2013	Preschool: **Daniel Tiger's Neighbourhood**, Bookaboo, Roll Play; Children 6-12: **The Next Step**, Almost Naked Animals S3, Rocket Monkeys; Youth 13-17: **The Phantoms**, Animism: The Gods' Lake, Blackbird
2014	Preschool: **Justin Time**, Peg + Cat, Yup Yups; Children 6-12: **Rocket Monkeys**, Annedroids, Slugterra; Youth 13-17: **If I Had Wings**, Japanizi: Going, Going, Gong!, Unsung: Behind the Glee
2016	Preschool: **Kate & Mim Mim**, Peg + Cat, The Moblees; Children 6-12: **Slugterra**, Bruno & Boots: Go Jump in the Pool, Snapshots; Youth 13-17: **L.M. Montgomery's Anne of Green Gables**, Max & Shred, Snowtime

=== Winners ===
Program Title	Production company	Producers
Degrassi: The Next Generation	Epitome Pictures Inc.	
Being Ian	Studio B (Being Ian) Productions Inc.	Blair Peters
Make Some Noise	Omni Film Productions Ltd	Brian Hamilton and Heather Hawthorn-Doyle
Life with Derek S3	Shaftesbury Films	Christina Jennings, Scott Garvie, Daphne Ballon, Laurie McLarty, Jeff Biederman, Suzanne French
Sticks and Stones	Cirrus Communications, Dream Street Pictures Inc.	Josée Vallée, André Béraud, Richard Speer, Timothy M. Hogan, Rick LeGuerrier
Dino Dan	Sinking Ship Entertainment	J.J. Johnson, Blair Powers, Matt Bishop
Wingin' It S2	Temple Street Productions	Ivan Schneeberg, David Fortier, Frank van Keeken
My Babysitter's a Vampire S1	Fresh TV Inc.	Brian Irving
Daniel Tiger's Neighbourhood	9 Story Entertainment	Vince Commisso, Steven Jarosz, Samantha Freeman Alpert, Kevin Morrison, Angela C. Santomero, Tanya Green, Wendy Harris, Julie Soebekti, Sarah Wallendjack
The Next Step	Temple Street Productions	Ivan Schneeberg, David Fortier, Frank van Keeken, Laura Harbin, Andrea Boyd, Laurie McLarty, Chloe van Keeken, Rachael Schaefer, Amy Wright, Jay Prychidny
The Phantoms	Dream Street Pictures Inc.	Timothy Hogan, Rick LeGuerrier
Justin Time	Guru Studio	Amy Robson, Mary Bredin, Frank Falcone
Rocket Monkeys	Breakthrough Entertainment	Ira Levy, Joan Lambur, Mark Evestaff
If I Had Wings	Really Real Films	Cynde Harmon
Kate & Mim Mim	DHX Media	
Slugterra	DHX Media	
L.M. Montgomery's Anne of Green Gables	Breakthrough Entertainment	

== International Emmy Kids Awards ==
The International Emmy Kids Awards is an annual event in February that recognizes the best in kids' programming around the world. The Shaw Rocket Fund was a presenting partner for five years beginning in 2013.
