= Baxter (TV series) =

- Pilot episode intertitle
- Created by: Daphne Ballon; Alex Pugsley
- Starring: Evan Williams; Holly Deveaux; Kyle Mac; Brittany Bristow; Shannon Kook-Chun; Tara Joshi; Dewshane Williams
- Theme music composer: Angelo Oddi
- Opening theme: "Baxter" performed by Evan Williams
- Composer: Angelo Oddi
- Country of origin: Canada
- Original language: English
- No. of seasons: 1
- No. of episodes: 13

Production
- Executive producers: Daphne Ballon; Christina Jennings; Scott Garvie
- Producers: Laura Harbin; Jan Peter Meyboom
- Production locations: Toronto, Ontario
- Camera setup: Film; Single-camera
- Running time: 22 minutes
- Production company: Shaftesbury Kids

Original release
- Network: Family Channel
- Release: May 24, 2010 – January 2, 2011

Baxter is a Canadian comedy television series produced by Shaftesbury Films, in association with Family Channel. The series ran from May 24, 2010, to January 2, 2011, before being cancelled later that year. Only 13 episodes of the series were produced.

== Plot ==
Baxter is a half-hour live-action comedy that follows student and wannabe comedian Baxter McNab and his friends at Northern Star School of the Arts.

== Cast ==
- Evan Williams as Baxter McNab, a slacker student when he accepted into his father's old high school, his acting style is a comedy winging it and has a love for improv acting. He also has a not-so-hidden crush on the new girl to the school Tassie Symons, and may develop a relationship with his best friend Emma Ruby. The two also share the first kiss of the series in "Trust Game" during an improv show down.
- Holly Deveaux as Emma Ruby, Baxter's best friend and aspiring actor who has shown an affinity towards dance, and accidental improv as shown when she and Baxter make fun of Shakespeare in "Trust Game". And she might develop feelings for Baxter and/or Devo. Devon and Emma had a moment on the episode "Dancing Fools."
- Kyle Mac as Marcus Crombie, Baxter's main rival in the series. He and Baxter are polar opposites in almost every way from their attitudes to their acting styles. Marcus prefers heavily scripted works of art but has shown to be able to adapt rather quickly to new events as shown in "Cindy and the Prince of Rock".
- Brittany Bristow as Tassie Symons, a new girl who came to Northern Star to help launch an acting career. Baxter has a crush on her but she likes his rival Marcus.
- Shannon Kook as Devon Phillip, a street dancer who came to Northern Star because his mom felt he needed a more control when he dances. He also develop feelings for Emma, considering the episode "Dancing Fools."
- Tara Joshi as Jenna Jacovitch, the star of the hit TV show "My Girlfriend Is an Alien". She takes dance and is over dramatic.
- Dewshane Williams as Jackal Corman, a director in the making. He also has an affinity towards dance getting along well with Devon even making their own hit dance together, called Dance Craz-Y.

== Production ==
The series was commissioned by Family Channel and then produced by Shaftesbury Films. It was created by Alex Pugsley and Daphne Ballon with Christina Jennings and Scott Garvie as executive producers. The series aired on May 24, 2010, and finished on January 2, 2011.

== Episodes ==
No.	Title	Original release date
1	"Baxter McNab"	6 June 2010
On his first day at the Northern Star School of the Arts, Baxter McNab is determined to keep the identity of his incredibly famous alumni father a secret. However, his best friend Emma is equally determined to blow his cover for his own good. Alongside two other new kids, Tassie and Deven, Baxter makes a pact to perform in the upcoming New Student Showcase. Things take a turn when Baxter discovers that his demanding drama teacher, Cecil Kingfield, already knows who his father is, leading him to believe he was only accepted due to nepotism. Overcome with self-doubt, Baxter bolts right before the showcase. When he sees Tassie struggling alone on stage, he finds his courage, returns to rock out on the piano, and completely knocks the performance out of the park. Impressed, Mr. Kingfield promises to keep Baxter’s secret
2	"Cry Me a River"	13 June 2010
When the drama students fail to demonstrate genuine emotion in their performances, Mr. Kingfield issues an ultimatum: deliver a monologue that results in real tears, or get kicked out of the drama program. While Marcus breezes through it, Baxter and Tassie completely freak out. Baxter’s mom Lily and his best friend Emma try everything to help him dredge up a painful memory to force him to cry, but nothing works—not even remembering his childhood pet newt. Ultimately, Baxter is only able to pass the assignment and save his spot in the program by tapping into his true, painful, unrequited feelings for Tassie. Meanwhile, in dance class, Deven's confidence is shaken when Ms. Mansfield gives him an A-minus and critiques his latest dance piece for entirely lacking passion.
3	"Mock vs Rock"	24 May 2010
It is time for Northern Star’s annual battle of the bands competition, "Rockin' Like The Stars," and Marcus is aggressively defending his title as last year's winner. To knock him down a peg, Baxter decides to unleash his inner mocker and forms a Spinal Tap-style parody band to ruthlessly lampoon Marcus's pretentious art rock group, recruiting Emma and Deven. However, Baxter's plans are jeopardized when he fails a major test, and Mr. Kingfield issues an ultimatum that he must pass a makeup exam or be banned from performing in the rock show. While Baxter frantically studies, Emma and Deven realize during rehearsals that he is actually a genuinely talented musician and urge him to drop the parody so they can compete for real. A nervous Baxter uses the test as an excuse to drop out entirely, as comedy is his security blanket and trying for real means risking genuine failure. The next day, a determined Emma storms into the classroom to passionately reason with Kingfield to let Baxter play, only for the teacher to reveal that Baxter actually passed the test on his own merits. With his excuse gone, Emma finally convinces a terrified Baxter to face his fears and step up to the microphone. The competition delivers an extra surprise when Mr. Kingfield himself takes the stage to perform a routine of his own. Meanwhile, a dramatic subplot unfolds as Jenna attempts to channel her inner singer-songwriter anguish for her own performance by abruptly dumping her boyfriend.
4	"Trust Games"	18 July 2010
When their regular drama teacher is out for the week, a substitute instructor named Mr. Harlow fills in to teach an improv class. Baxter takes to it like a duck to water, while Emma is absolutely terrified. Meanwhile, Marcus storms out of the room in a rage because he thinks Mr. Harlow's unscripted games are a joke. In the hallway, Jenna intercepts him to maliciously "warn" him that the new girl, Tassie, has a crush on him. The plan backfires when Marcus's ego is flattered; he turns right around and asks Tassie to be his partner for the school's upcoming live improv competition show. Seeing his crush Tassie paired up with his rival Marcus in front of a live audience causes Baxter to completely freeze up on stage. To save the performance from disaster, Emma is forced to completely break out of her shell to rescue the scene. Meanwhile, Deven is stuck doing a stressful ballet routine with the school diva, Ruby.
5	"To Crush or Not To Crush"	20 June 2010
As Baxter’s secret crush on Tassie reaches epic proportions, his mother Lily advises him to vent his feelings by writing a love poem in the style of John Keats. Baxter believes he is cured, but the romantic poem accidentally falls out of his notebook and gets posted anonymously on the school bulletin board. To make matters worse, Ms. Mansfield brings it into English class as a literature study piece, while a delusional Jenna convinces herself the poem was written for her. Emma attempts to cure Baxter's fixation through aversion therapy, but when it fails, she forces him to confess his true feelings to Tassie. Meanwhile, Jackal is miserable over an assignment to create an "artsy-fartsy" experimental film, which he views as a complete waste of time, until accidental camera footage sparks an unexpected multi-media dance inspiration.
6	"Duelling Hearts"	27 June 2010
When Emma is chosen to organize the school's Renaissance Festival, her determination to impress Mr. Kingfield drives her completely overboard. Though Baxter begs to be cast as a noble knight, his refusal to take sword fighting seriously forces a stressed Emma to demote her best buddy from duellist to jester. Meanwhile, Deven and Jenna are highly frustrated by the incredibly lame, traditional Renaissance dancing and boring moves, eventually threatening to quit the festival entirely over the pantaloons. On the day of the festival, Deven mixes a modern track to successfully bring the performance into the 21st century. When the main event is jeopardized, Baxter steps up in his jester attire to battle Marcus in the official sword duel, completely saving Emma's festival from failure and leaving a lasting impression on Kingfield.
7	"Vampire Movies"	10 October 2010
In order to avoid writing a tedious English essay on gothic literature, Baxter convinces Ms. Mansfield to let him and Emma film a vampire movie instead, recruiting Jackal to direct. Behind the scenes, creative control instantly fractures the group; Baxter lets his ego take over, casting his crush Tassie as the lead female victim despite her complete lack of acting experience, while aggressively overriding Emma's casting choices. Fed up with the boys' sexist clichés and lame take on vampires, Emma, Tassie, and Jenna quit the production to make their own competing, female-driven vampire film. Both heavily compromised productions quickly descend into disaster as the rival student crews actively try to sabotage each other's equipment and sets. Ultimately, they are forced to pool their footage together at the final deadline to salvage a passing grade.
8	"Audition Fever"	4 July 2010
The school buzzes with anticipation when auditions open for the upcoming school musical, The Pirate King. Originally, Baxter only tries out for a small, effortless part to fulfill his performance quota. However, when an arrogant Marcus begins bragging about having the lead role locked down, Baxter shifts gears out of pure spite and decides to compete directly against him for the coveted title character. Meanwhile, an intense backstage rivalry ignites between Emma and Jenna when they realize they are both competing for the exact same lead female role. As audition fever consumes the student body, friendships are tested under the pressure. Ultimately, the casting director throws a massive curveball that shocks both sets of rivals, forcing everyone to reconsider their casting expectations.
9	"Zap the Competition"	11 July 2010
When pretentious video director K-Red—who happens to be one of Jackal's ultimate heroes—arrives at Northern Star to film a professional pimple commercial, the student body goes into a frenzy. To find the perfect angle, K-Red challenges the students to pitch their own creative ideas for the advertisement. While Jenna relies on her television star celebrity status, Deven films an intense hip-hop breakdancing routine, and a deeply emotional Emma overshares by recalling a painful, dramatic childhood zit experience. Baxter is completely stumped until he draws inspiration from the chaotic antics of his younger siblings to create a goofy, lighthearted ad. Meanwhile, Marcus is completely disgusted by the commercialization of their art school and stages a passionate, one-man protest to shut the entire production down. The ultimate twist arrives when the corporate client demands a perky, upbeat tone, forcing K-Red to crown Baxter's funny concept the winner—and cast a hypocritical Marcus as the commercial's starring face.
10	"Cindy and the Prince of Rock"	25 July 2010
With only two weeks left until the school's end-of-term production of Glass Shoe: A Cinderella Story opens, guest director Belinda Nightingale suffers from a severe creative block brought on by personal romantic problems. Mr. Kingfield issues a strict ultimatum: if Belinda cannot find a clear artistic vision for the show within two days, the entire musical will be canceled. Desperate to fix the crisis, Emma and Jenna find themselves playing therapists and listening to Belinda's love woes. Meanwhile, a jealous Baxter initially tries to pitch ridiculous creative suggestions to intentionally derail the production, hoping to kybosh the very real, growing romantic attraction developing between his crush Tassie and Marcus—who are playing the musical's leads. When his plans threaten to destroy the show entirely, Baxter has a change of heart and uses his genuine musical talent to save the day. He pitches a complete rewrite, transforming the boring story into a modern rock musical where Cinderella is a waitress and the Prince is a rock star. Tassie and Marcus absolutely nail the new song in front of Kingfield, and a re-inspired Belinda officially renames the production Cindy and the Prince of Rock.
11	"Dance Craze-Y"	24 May 2010
Seeking to inject some traditional teenage fun into their intense art academy, Baxter goes toe-to-toe with Mr. Kingfield by proposing an official school dance. When Kingfield aggressively denies the request, citing a strict, long-term campus ban on dances, a rebellious Baxter defies orders and decides to secretly organize an underground dance anyway. Meanwhile, Tassie is left completely heartbroken after being abruptly dumped by Marcus. To help her friend move on, Emma steps in to cheer her up by organizing a "boy-free" anti-romance night, complete with junk food and movie marathons. In the dance studio, Deven and Jackal become obsessed with viral fame and team up to choreograph the next big internet dance craze, though they struggle to find the perfect signature move. When Kingfield catches wind of the underground party, the event is saved at the last second when Deven and Jackal's newly debuted dance routine completely wins over the faculty, forcing Kingfield to compromise.
12	"Dancing Fools"	1 August 2010
Believing that the best way to meet girls is to branch out into new arts disciplines, Baxter signs up for a mandatory lyrical dance workshop despite having zero talent or background in dance. Once inside the class, his plan shifts entirely as he falls hard for a talented but elusive fellow dancer named Anya. He spends his energy desperately attempting to win her over with his wit and awkward footwork. Meanwhile, Deven cannot stand the overly emotional, hyper-expressive nature of lyrical choreography. Finding it entirely unappealing, Deven fakes a sprained ankle to escape, but eventually relies on Emma's tough-love encouragement to confront his dislike and push through the intensive. When a suspicious Mr. Kingfield figures out Baxter’s ulterior motives, he refuses to let him drop out of the workshop and forces him to perform a high-stakes routine at the end-of-week showcase. Left with no choice after Jackal abandons him as a lost cause, a desperate Baxter confesses his feelings to Anya and begs for her assistance to save him from public embarrassment.
13	"Finale"	2 January 2011
Show night arrives for the highly anticipated premiere of the student rock musical Cindy and the Prince of Rock. Having originally written himself into a small, effortless comic supporting role to avoid the spotlight, Baxter is left utterly dismayed when a last-minute casting shift forces him into the lead male role instead. To make matters worse, his anxiety skyrockets when he learns that his incredibly famous alumni father is sitting in the audience to watch the performance. Paralyzed by the fear of being compared to his father, Baxter considers fleeing the production entirely. Emma steps in to ground him, reminding him that the rock musical is his own unique creation. Baxter takes the stage, conquering his stage fright to deliver a spectacular, breakout performance that leaves both the audience and his father stunned. Backstage, the intense performance brings the season's romantic tension to a head, forcing Baxter, Emma, and Tassie to finally address their feelings and redefine their relationships as the school term comes to a close.
