= Christmas Wedding Planner =

- Directed by: Justin G. Dyck
- Screenplay by: Keith Cooper
- Based on: Once Upon A Wedding by Stacy Connelly
- Starring: Jocelyn Hudon; Stephen Huszar; Kelly Rutherford; Melinda Shankar
- Release date: December 2017
- Country: Canada
- Language: English

Christmas Wedding Planner is a 2017 Canadian drama romance film, directed by Justin G. Dyck and screenplay by Keith Cooper. The film is based on Once Upon A Wedding by Stacy Connelly.

== Plot ==
Kelsey (Jocelyn Hudon) is beginning her career as a wedding planner by arranging the wedding of her cousin and bosom friend, Emily (Rebecca Dalton). The theme, as the title suggests, is Christmas Eve. Kelsey is running late to an event related to the wedding, annoying her Aunt Olivia (Kelly Rutherford), who is also her mentor. She had gotten delayed at a coffee shop, where she meets Emily's ex-boyfriend Connor (Stephen Huszar), and asks him for the last blueberry scone. He refuses to give it to her, and she leaves, going to the event and finding him there. Aunt Olivia tells Kelsey to "keep an eye" on him, so she goes over to talk to him. He baits her into walking outside with him and reveals that he is a PI (Private Investigator) who wants to get the skinny on Emily's fiancé, Todd (Eric Hicks). Connor invites Kelsey to work with him, but she refuses.

After that, Kelsey goes to a fitting, where she finds out that Emily and Connor were getting serious when Connor left without warning or explanation. Then, she sees Todd acting in a way she perceives as "flirty" towards the store owner, and becomes suspicious of him, too, causing her to do a little digging of her own. She agrees to work with Connor and tells him that Todd and the store owner are having dinner at Turbo's on Wednesday night.

While spying on Todd, Kelsey and Connor encounter mishaps along their investigative journey that reveal to the audience that they like each other, and just how much they enjoy pretending to be in a relationship. At the dinner, they find out that Todd and the store owner are friends. Todd was thanking the store owner with dinner for the good deal he received for Emily's dress.

Aunt Olivia reveals to Kelsey that her uncle paid off Connor ten years ago to leave Emily and that a few months ago, her uncle had paid Connor again. Kelsey confronts Connor and tells him that she doesn't want to see him again.

Before the wedding, Connor tricks Kelsey into meeting, where he tells her that he took the money, which he believed was a loan, to help his friend George (Joey Fatone) keep his family restaurant. He is unable to explain the recent transaction of money, so Kelsey leaves. At the end of the movie, Connor crashes the wedding with dirt on Todd: he got a servant pregnant a few months ago and she went to Connor and told him everything. The movie ends with Connor proposing to Kelsey, and Kelsey accepting, as the wedding finishes off.

== Critical reception ==
Christmas Wedding Planner was dubbed "wildly bad" by Pajiba. Common Sense Media gave it 2 out of 5, and called it "a bland, paint-by-numbers, cookie-cutter, not-an-original-moment-throughout made-for-TV piece of fluff that will neither satisfy nor delight anyone who has ever seen a movie before."

== Cast ==
- Jocelyn Hudon as Kelsey
- Stephen Huszar as Connor
- Kelly Rutherford as Aunt Olivia
- Rebecca Dalton as Emily
- Eric Hicks as Todd
- Joey Fatone as George
