= Nobody's Watching =

Unreleased American sitcom

- Created by: Bill Lawrence; Neil Goldman; Garrett Donovan
- Starring: Taran Killam; Paul Campbell; Paul Adelstein; Bob Clendenin; Lauren Bittner; Mircea Monroe
- Country of origin: United States
- Original language: English
- No. of episodes: 1

Production
- Camera setup: single-camera/multi-camera
- Running time: 22 mins (approx)

Original release
- Network: The WB

Nobody's Watching is a 2005 US television program that was never broadcast. It originated with and was written by the creator of Scrubs, Bill Lawrence, as well as Neil Goldman and Garrett Donovan, writers for Scrubs and Family Guy.

== Program history ==
The pilot was developed for the WB Television Network, but network executives passed on the show for the 2005 schedule after test audiences seemed to be confused by its premise. However, in June 2006, the pilot was leaked onto YouTube and quickly attracted attention from that platform's viewers. On July 3, a report in the New York Times suggested that the show could yet make it to a full series, thanks to the positive response from YouTube viewers. During the Friday, July 21, 2006, broadcast of Last Call with Carson Daly, guests Neil Goldman, Taran Killam and Paul Campbell called NBC president Kevin Reilly on air, who seemed to confirm an interest in the series. He later recanted, but a deal was struck to produce webisodes. Webisodes of varying length were released until January 12, 2007. In an interview with TV Squad, Lawrence divulged that NBC would broadcast a live TV special in March 2007. However, in February 2007, the Pittsburgh Post-Gazette reported that the executive producer Bill Lawrence had voiced concerns that the show would not be broadcast and this was eventually confirmed by an NBC spokesperson who said, "The project is not going forward." Lawrence also said that the actors' contracts would expire at the end of February. There has been no live TV special as of December 2017.

"Derrick" and "Will" have been extras on other NBC-produced series such as Days of Our Lives and Scrubs.

== Plot ==
The show is about two friends from Union, Ohio, named Derrick (Taran Killam) and Will (Paul Campbell), who send a home video to every network, claiming they can produce a better sitcom than the ones currently being broadcast. The WB takes them up on this offer. Derrick and Will are taken to The WB studios, where they meet the head of The WB, Jeff Tucker (Paul Adelstein), Creative VP Roy Ingold (Bob Clendenin), and Tucker's assistant, whom he introduces as Jill Something (Lauren Bittner). Tucker tells them to create their sitcom, while working on various sitcom-related sets. In addition, a reality show will be made about their sitcom's birth. Thus, the pair has a camera crew following them around The WB studios, when they are not on the sets, and a live studio audience, when they are working on the sets.

After setting the scene, the rest of the episode focuses on Derrick and Will's first day trying to come up with a sitcom. Over the course of the episode, they hire Jill Something as their assistant and make a pity-hire of Mandy (Mircea Monroe), who had just been fired from The WB gift shop. Meanwhile, Tucker and Ingold interfere by trying to introduce narrative conflicts into the show. Tucker tells Derrick he would rather continue the show without Will and demands that Mandy kiss Will, even though she prefers Derrick.

The title of the show is explained in the last scene: the cast is hanging out in the sitcom set, with the live audience reacting as if it is an actual show, which Mandy thinks is weird but is told to just pretend that "nobody's watching". Will says that "nobody's watching" is a perfect name for the sitcom they are developing (thus, Nobody's Watching is the name of the fake sitcom in the fake reality television show, Nobody's Watching). Derrick protests that "nobody's watching" is a terrible name, because critics will constantly ridicule them with comments like "nobody's watching Nobody's Watching!" He declares that it would be insane to name a television show that. This is immediately followed by the announcer saying "Next week, on Nobody's Watching!..."
