= Argyle Secondary School =

Public secondary school in North Vancouver, British Columbia, Canada

Location
- 1131 Frederick Road; North Vancouver (District), British Columbia, V7K 1J3; Canada; 49.341734°N 123.043402°W

Information
- School type: Public secondary school Arts High School
- Motto: Carpe diem (Seize the day)
- Established: 1960
- School board: School District 44 North Vancouver
- Superintendent: Pius Ryan
- Principal: Laura Ames
- Grades: 8–12
- Enrollment: 1445 (as of 2011–2012 school year)
- Colours: Forest green and gold/ Yellow
- Mascot: The (Bag)Piper
- Team name: Pipers
- Website: www.sd44.ca/school/argyle/Pages/default.aspx

Argyle Secondary School is a high school and an arts program focused school in the Upper Lynn Valley school district of North Vancouver (District), in British Columbia, Canada. In the 2011–2012 school year, enrollment was 1,445.

== History ==
Argyle Secondary School was built in 1960, and has undergone renovations in 1966, 1969, and 2000. In June 2016, it was confirmed that the school would receive $47.5 million for seismic upgrades, $37.6 million from the province and $8.1 million from the school district. Construction was completed in January 2021 after many delays.

In the fall of 2014, Argyle succumbed to a small flood due to heavy rainfall overnight. The flash flood, 100 millimetres (3.9 in) in 24 hours, caused families to evacuate their homes. They traced the source back to a plug in one of the many creeks in the area, which then found another path to flow down which turned out to be Kilmer (where flooding was the worst) and then Fromme. The extent of the damage on the school was the inundation of nine classrooms and the drama department's prop room. The following morning school was canceled as professionals and families alike attempted to reduce the damage to the school.

== Notable alumni ==
- Bryan Adams, Singer-songwriter, photographer
- Taylor Curran, field hockey athlete, Olympian
- Godfrey Gao, actor
- Trevor Guthrie, Singer/songwriter
- Brett Hull, NHL player
- Paul Kariya, NHL player
- Darcy Michael, Comedian and actor
- Jason Priestley, actor
- Jessica Smith, track and field athlete, Olympian
- Jen and Sylvia Soska, directors and producers
