= Holly Deveaux =

Canadian actress

- Born: 31 March 1994 (age 32); Toronto, Ontario
- Years active: 2009–present

Holly Deveaux is a Canadian actress. She is known for starring in the television series Baxter, Less Than Kind, and Spun Out.

== Career ==
In 2012, Deveaux was cast as Casey Anthony in Prosecuting Casey Anthony, a television movie based on death of Caylee Anthony, though the part was ultimately recast. The same year her performance in the television film The Phantoms garnered praise from The Globe and Mail reviewer John Doyle who remarked, "Outstanding is Deveaux as Tess, the most complex and troubled of the teenagers. Deveaux (last seen in Less Than Kind) is luminous, her pale face subtly registering every hurt, every worry and every insult that comes her way..." In 2014, she starred in the Syfy original movie Mutant World. In 2015, she played a prominent guest role on an episode of Rookie Blue playing a dangerous prison inmate.

== Filmography ==
Film roles
Year	Title	Role	Notes
2009	Victoria Day	Cayla Chapman	
2011	Tile Man	Tina	
2011	Unlucky	Melanie	
2013	Breakout	Jen	originally titled Split Decision
2014	Big Muddy	June Baker	
2014	Mutant World	Melissa King	
2019	Beast Within	Cheyenne	also known as Hunter's Moon
2023	Polarized	Lisa	

Television roles
Year	Title	Role	Notes
2010	Haven	Brooke Garrick	Episode: "Resurfacing"
2010	Lost Girl	Portia	Episode: "Faetal Justice"
2010–2011	Baxter	Emma Ruby	Main role
2011	Breakout Kings	Haley	Episode: "Fun with Chemistry"
2011	Murdoch Mysteries	Arlene Dennet	Episode: "Bloodlust"
2011	Flashpoint	Dana Mayweather	Episode: "Run, Jamie, Run"
2011	Silent Witness	Marcie Calder	Television film
2012	Less Than Kind	Katya	Recurring role
2012	The Phantoms	Tess Jordan	Television film
2013	Cracked	Jessica O'Donnell	Episode: "Cherry Blossoms"
2013	Hannibal	Marissa Schurr	Episode: "Potage"
2013	Hemlock Grove	Jenny Fredericks	Recurring role
2013	His Turn	Megan Willow	Television film
2013	The Listener	Nikki Hutton	Episode: "House of Horror"
2014–2015	Spun Out	Abby Hayes	Main role
2015	Rookie Blue	Rochelle Dawber	Episode: "Uprising"
2016–2019	Shadowhunters	Rebecca Lewis	Recurring role
2017	Running Away	Maggie	Television film
2017	Deadly Attraction	Amanda	Television film
2017	The Mist	Zoe	Recurring role
2018	12 Monkeys	Young Olivia	Episode: "45 RPM"
2020	Future Man	Marilyn Monroe	3 episodes
2020	MacGyver	Peyton	Episode: "Code + Artemis + Nuclear + N3mesis"
2021	Supergirl	Dr. Beatrice Lahr	Episode: "The Gauntlet"
2021	Christmas Movie Magic	Alli Blakeman	Television film
2024	Cradle of Deception	Erin	Television film
2025	A Firefighter's Christmas Calendar	Dani Reed	Television film
2026	The Way Home	Abby Goodwin	6 Episodes
