= Darcy Michael =

Canadian actor and stand-up comedian

- Born: Pickering, Ontario, Canada
- Occupations: film and television actor, comedian
- Known for: Spun Out, One Skinny Bitch

Darcy Michael is a Canadian actor and stand-up comedian, best known for his stand-up comedy, his viral TikTok account and his role in the Canadian television sitcom Spun Out.

== Career ==
Nominated for a Canadian Comedy Award in 2010 for his appearance at the Winnipeg Comedy Festival, he filmed his own half-hour special for The Comedy Network series Comedy Now! the same year. His career as a comedian significantly took off with his 2012 comedy special One Skinny Bitch, which was released as a direct download and in DVD format. The special, taped at Yuk Yuk's in Toronto, Ontario, centred in part on his experience losing over 120 pounds after a health scare. Around the same time, he also filmed several episodes of a proposed talk show, The Skinny, interviewing guests including Alan Thicke, Caroline Rhea, Judy Gold, David Steinberg and Harland Williams.

In 2014, he was a finalist in SiriusXM Canada's Top Comic competition, and received a second Canadian Comedy Award nomination as Best Breakout Artist.

He has also performed at the Halifax Comedy Festival, Just for Laughs, Calgary Pride, Vancouver Pride and Toronto Pride, appears frequently on the CBC Radio One comedy series The Debaters and the Comedy Network edition of Match Game, and has had several stage roles in theatre productions in Vancouver.

In 2016 he released his album Family Highs, which debuted at number 1 on iTunes, Google Play and Amazon.

In 2018, he was the first comedian to release a 60-minute stand up special on CraveTV. Produced by Just for Laughs the special Darcy Michael Goes to Church was called "the queer stand up special you've been waiting for" by Now Magazine.

In 2021 Michael launched a TikTok account with his husband Jeremy that has quickly grown to over 2 million followers and over 30 million likes. Around the same time he launched a podcast, High School Sucked, with comedian Jane Stanton that consistently charted in the top 100 comedy podcasts worldwide. In April 2021, BuzzFeed said "If you're not listening to High School Sucked, you're missing out."

In 2023, Michael, alongside his husband, started their No Refunds stand up tour across North America - in 2024, they expanded to over 45 cities and announced Europe and UK dates as well.

== Personal life ==
Originally from Pickering, Ontario, Michael grew up in North Vancouver where he graduated from Argyle Secondary School. He is currently based in Ladner, British Columbia. Openly gay, he lives with his husband of 20 years Jeremy Baer and their daughter.

== Filmography ==
=== Film ===
Year	Title	Role	Notes
2007	Numb	Video store clerk	
2011	Diary of a Wimpy Kid: Rodrick Rules	Convenience store customer	
2011	Lloyd the Conqueror	Unicorn	
2013	Rapture-Palooza	Second Wraith	
2014	Date and Switch	Customer	

=== Television ===
Year	Title	Role	Notes
2007	Reaper	Roger	Episode: Leon
2009	The Assistants	Clerk	Episode: The Addiction
2010	Life Unexpected	Engineer	Episode: Criminal Incriminated
2011	Endgame	Ben	Episode: Gorillas in Our Midst
2011	Rags: The Movie	Customer in Restroom	TV movie
2012	A Christmas Story 2	Charity Volunteer	TV movie
2014–2015	Spun Out	Gordon Woolmer	Main character
2016	Lucifer	Kevin Burnick	Episode: Homewrecker
2018	This Blows	Detective Tanenbaum	
2018	Legends of Tomorrow	Steve	Episode: Wet Hot American Bummer
2019	The Twilight Zone	M.C.	Episode: The Comedian
2026	Scrubs	Maintenance Guy	3 episodes
