= Liz Sheridan =

American actress (1929–2022)

- Sheridan in an episode of ALF
- Born: Elizabeth Ann Sheridan; April 10, 1929; Rye, New York, U.S.
- Died: April 15, 2022 (aged 93); New York City, U.S.
- Occupations: Actress; dancer; author
- Years active: 1950s–2010
- Known for: ALF; Seinfeld
- Spouse: Dale Wales (m. 1985; died 2003)
- Children: 1
- Father: Frank Sheridan

Elizabeth Ann Sheridan (April 10, 1929 – April 15, 2022) was an American actress. While best known for her roles as the nosy neighbor, Mrs. Ochmonek, on the sitcom ALF (1986–1990), and Jerry's mother, Helen, in Seinfeld (1990–1998), her decades-long career was extensive and included work on the stage and on large and small screens.

== Early life ==
Sheridan was born Elizabeth Ann Sheridan in Rye, New York, on April 10, 1929. Her father, Frank Sheridan, was a classical pianist; her mother, Elizabeth Poole-Jones, was a concert singer. She was raised by her mother in Westchester County, New York, after her parents' separation. As a child, she was given the nickname "Dizzy", a shortened version of "Dizabeth", which is how her sister managed to pronounce her name when they were young.

Her father was of half Irish and half Ashkenazi Jewish (from Germany and England) descent. Her maternal grandparents were English immigrants.

== Career ==
Sheridan began her professional life as a nightclub dancer and singer in the 1950s, and spent much of her early career living and working in the Caribbean. In the late 1960s, back in New York City, she performed in one of Julius Monk's annual cabaret reviews at Plaza 9, located in the Plaza Hotel. She also appeared in plays and musicals on Broadway, co-starring with Meryl Streep and Christopher Lloyd in the 1977 musical, Happy End, before moving to Los Angeles. Working in Hollywood, she came to prominence in supporting roles in over a dozen feature films and 60 prime time network television movies, mini-series, and series including Kojak, Archie Bunker's Place, St. Elsewhere, Newhart, Moonlighting, The A-Team, Who's the Boss, Hill St. Blues, Cagney & Lacey, Family Ties, Murder, She Wrote, and Double Rush. Her first major role was playing the nosy neighbor Raquel Ochmonek on the NBC TV series ALF, from 1986 to 1990.

Following that she secured a long-lived role as Jerry's "protective, Florida-living mom", Helen, on Seinfeld. She appeared in all nine seasons, from 1990 to 1998, the only actor to do so apart from the four leads, and was the last surviving actress to play one of the parents of the Seinfeld main cast members.

In 2009, with Andy Griffith and Doris Roberts, Sheridan co-starred in the feature film Play the Game, a romantic comedy about a widowed grandfather who learns dating tricks from his serial romancer of a grandson. The film received attention for containing a sex scene between Sheridan and Griffith.

== Personal life ==
While working as a dancer in New York City nightclubs, Sheridan met the then-unknown James Dean. She wrote a book, Dizzy & Jimmy: My Life with James Dean: A Love Story, chronicling their time together in the early 1950s. In it, she describes them as each other's first romantic love. "We had great times... We didn't want to be apart. We found a place and lived together... before he really hit it big." At one point in their relationship, they found themselves traveling to Ohio with Major League Baseball player Clyde McCullough. During the trip, as they discussed baseball, she realized that if she and Dean were married she would be known as "Dizzy Dean", evoking thoughts of the baseball player of the same name.

Dean pursued work on the stage in New York City, with film roles in Hollywood soon to follow. Without sure footing or a serious plan, forging a future was not an option, thus bringing about the end of their relationship. "He was being hauled away into this career, and I couldn't follow him," she said in an interview.

Early in 1953, Sheridan departed New York City for the Virgin Islands. She lived for over a decade in St. Thomas and later Puerto Rico. She earned a living as a dancer and also by singing and playing piano. Together with a neighbor who had a dance troupe, she won a dance contest she choreographed for the first Carnival in St. Thomas. She also earned a $600 purse finishing first in a horse race, atop her stallion, Generalé.

After a brief engagement to Justus "Pancho" Villa, she realized she did not want to marry him, broke it off, and returned for a time to New York City. There, at a party, she again met Dean. Afterwards, in a cab, he told her, "Nothing's lost between us. It never will be. You're a part of me and I'm a part of you. I take you with me wherever I go." That was the last time she saw him.

Back in the Caribbean, she met jazz musician [William] Dale Wales (1917–2003) in Puerto Rico. They shared a life from 1960 until his death in 2003; they wed in 1985. Their daughter Stephanie is a photographer. Sheridan said, "I'm so unmotherly, I cannot tell you. I'm still a flower child somewhere. My daughter was more my friend than my daughter most of her life."

Sheridan and actress Elizabeth Montgomery were friends and were known as Dizzy and Lizzie. Montgomery only took on the nickname "Lizzie" following her performance in the Emmy Award-winning TV movie, The Legend of Lizzie Borden The pair adored horses and together they frequented the Santa Anita race track.

== Death ==
Sheridan died on April 15, 2022, at the age of 93.

== Filmography ==
=== Film ===
Year	Title	Role	Notes
1982	Jekyll and Hyde... Together Again	Mrs. Larson	
1983	Star 80	Makeup Woman	
1984	Nickel Mountain	Reception Nurse	
1985	Avenging Angel	Nurse	
1985	School Spirit	Mrs. Kingman	
1986	Legal Eagles	Juror	
1987	Who's That Girl	Nurse #1	
1992	Only You	Mrs. Stein	
1992	Wishman	Ms. Finger	
1993	Brainsmasher... A Love Story	Ma Molly	
1995	Forget Paris	Woman in Car	
1996	Wedding Bell Blues	Mrs. Samuel Levine	
1996	A&P	Hi-Ho Lady	Short film
1997	Always Say Goodbye	Muriel Evans	
2002	Now You Know	Grandma	
2004	Surge of Power: The Stuff of Heroes	—N/a	
2007	The Blacksmith and the Carpenter	God's Wife	Voice; Short film
2009	Play the Game	Edna Gordon	
2010	Trim	Helen	

=== Television ===
Year	Title	Role	Notes
1977	Kojak	Rose	Episode: "Kojak's Days: Part 1"
1981	The White Shadow	Restaurant Customer	Episode: "B.M.O.C."
1981	Archie Bunker's Place	Lady	Episode: "Billie"
1982	World War III	Naomi Glass	Miniseries
1982	Gimme a Break!	Nurse Whales	Episode: "The Emergency"
1982	In the Custody of Strangers	Caseworker	Television film
1982	Tucker's Witch	Secretary	Episode: "Big Mouth"
1983	St. Elsewhere	Dr. Susan Mauri	Episode: "The Count"
1983	Oh Madeline	Mrs. Phelps	Episode: "Mummy Dearest"
1983	Scarecrow and Mrs. King	Lydia Lowell	Episode: "If Thoughts Could Kill"
1983	One Day at a Time	Mrs. Muller	Episode: "The Dentist"
1983, 1985	The A-Team	Hildegard Henderson / Tina Lavelle	2 episodes
1984	Second Sight: A Love Story	Mrs. Carlisle	Television film
1984	Three's a Crowd	Miss Rockwell	Episode: "Daddy's Little Girl"
1984	The Cartier Affair	Miss Carpenter	Television film
1984	Riptide	Everitt's Secretary	Episode: "Father's Day"
1985	Sins of the Father	Middle-Aged Woman	Television film
1985	It's Your Move	Eunice	Episode: "A Woman Is Just a Woman"
1985	Newhart	Mrs. Spencer	Episode: "Look Homeward, Stephanie"
1985	Moonlighting	Selma	Episode: "Pilot"
1985	Generation	Clara	Television film
1985	Santa Barbara	Nurse Greta Bayley	3 episodes
1985	Brothers	Zelda March	Episode: "Happy Birthday, Baby Brother"
1985	Who's the Boss?	Gertrude	Episode: "Custody: Part 2"
1985, 1986	Remington Steele	Greta Swenson / Woman in Hallway	2 episodes
1986	Hill Street Blues	Dorothy Miskin	Episode: "I Want My Hill Street Blues"
1986	Cagney & Lacey	Dr. Vernon	Episode: "Sorry, Right Number"
1986	Kate's Secret	Evelyn	Television film
1986	The Magical World of Disney	Hostess	Episode: "Sunday Drive"
1986	A Year in the Life	Lois	Episode: "The First Christmas"
1986–1990	ALF	Raquel Ochmonek	34 episodes
1987	Warm Hearts, Cold Feet	Amanda McPherson	Television film
1988	The Secret Life of Kathy McCormick	Mrs. Van Adams	Television film
1988	Family Ties	Ginny McCoy	Episode: "Heartstrings: Part 3"
1989	It's a Living	Sophie	Episode: "Matchmaker, Matchmaker"
1990	Piece of Cake	Mrs. Katz	Television film
1990	Good Grief	Widow Blackwell	Episode: "Warren Learns to Fly"
1990	Dr. Ruth's House	Jessica Dimmesdale	Television film
1990, 1994	Empty Nest	Mrs. Coover / Elspeth	2 episodes
1990–1998	Seinfeld	Helen Seinfeld	21 episodes
1991	Changes	Mrs. Hahn	Television film
1991	Murder, She Wrote	Rose Tessler	Episode: "Bite the Big Apple"
1992	Melrose Place	Woman Shopper	Episode: "My Way"
1994	Blossom	Mrs. Walker	Episode: "Blossom Gump"
1994–1997	Life with Louie	Mrs. Stillman	7 episodes
1995	Double Rush	Marge	Episode: "Slamming Into a Car Isn't Good"
1995	Sliders	Miss Miller	Episode: "Prince of Wails"
1995	Deadline for Murder: From the Files of Edna Buchanan	Wendy Padison	Television film
1995	Cleghorne!	Madame Bourreau	2 episodes
1997	A Match Made in Heaven	Ruthie Klein	Television film
2005	Complete Savages	Mrs. O'Hara	Episode: "Crimes and Mini-Wieners"
2005	Numbers	Landlady	Episode: "Bones of Contention"
2007	American Dad!	Mrs. Rothberg (voice)	Episode: "An Apocalypse to Remember"

=== Stage ===
Year	Title	Role	Notes
1968	Ballad for a Firing Squad	Claudine	Theatre de Lys, Off-Broadway
1971	Frank Merriwell	Mrs. Snood	Longacre Theatre, Broadway
1971	Hurry, Harry	Mama	Ritz Theatre, Broadway
1973	Anything Goes	Mrs. Evangeline Harcourt	National Tour
1976	Something's Afoot	Lady Grace Manley-Prowe	Lyceum Theatre, Broadway
1976	Best Friend	Mary Tagliavini	Lyceum Theatre, Broadway
1977	Happy End	Major Stone	Martin Beck Theatre, Broadway
1978	Ballroom	Shirley	Majestic Theatre, Broadway
1979	Once a Catholic	Mother Basil (Understudy)	Helen Hayes Theater, Broadway
1980	The Duenna	The Duenna	Baltimore Center Stage
1993	Into the Woods	Jack's Mother	Long Beach Civic Light Opera
1997	All I Really Need to Know I Learned in Kindergarten	Kathleen	Ford's Theatre
1998	Something's Afoot	Miss Tweed	Ogunquit Playhouse

== Book ==
- Sheridan, Liz. (2000) Dizzy & Jimmy: My Life with James Dean: A Love Story. New York: HarperEntertainment. ISBN 0-0603-9383-1
