= Rebecca Dalton =

Canadian actress

Rebecca "Becky" Dalton is a Canadian actress known for her roles in the TV series Good Witch and Spun Out.

== Early life ==
Dalton attended Oakville Trafalgar High School and St. Mildred's-Lightbourn School, and after graduating in 2006, travelled through South East Asia for five months, visiting Cambodia, Hong Kong, Thailand and Vietnam. On her return to Canada, she enrolled at Ryerson University in Toronto.

== Personal life ==
In July 2018, Dalton became engaged to former IndyCar-driver James Hinchcliffe, with whom she attended his high school prom in 2004. On 3 August 2019, Dalton and Hinchcliffe were married at the Muskoka Bay Club Resort in Gravenhurst, Ontario.

== Career ==
In 2010, Dalton made her on-screen appearance in an episode of the Canadian-American TV series Unnatural History in the role of Sally. In the same year she was also cast in the Canadian TV movie My Babysitter's a Vampire in the role of Della ('Popcorn Lady').

In 2013, Dalton was cast as Stephanie Lyons, one of the leading roles in the Canadian TV series Spun Out.

In 2015, Dalton was cast to replace Ashley Leggat in the recurring role of Tara for season two of the Hallmark Channel's series Good Witch, a role she reprised in subsequent seasons. In the same year she was also cast in the role of Katie Littleton in the 2016 TV movie Total Frat Party.

Dalton has also appeared in a number of Canadian TV movies, including RockyRoad (2014), A Perfect Christmas (2016), Christmas Wedding Planner, (2017) and The Dog Lover's Guide to Dating (2023).

== Filmography ==
Film roles
Year	Title	Role	Notes
2010	My Babysitter's a Vampire	Della ('Popcorn Lady')	TV movie
2014	Rocky Road	Suzie Barnes	TV movie
2015	The Unauthorized Melrose Place Story	Courtney Thorne-Smith	TV movie
2016	A Perfect Christmas	Robin	TV movie
2016	Total Frat Movie	Katie Littleton	TV movie
2017	Christmas Wedding Planner	Emily	TV movie
2019	Christmas in Paris	Robin Harbin	TV movie
2020	The Santa Squad a/k/a Santa's Squad	Allie	TV movie
2021	Lemonade Stand Romance	Trish	TV movie
2021	Honeymoon to Remember	Ava	TV movie
2022	From Italy with Amore	Ariel Moss	TV movie
2022	A Tiny Home Christmas	Blair Callahan	TV movie
2023	The Dog Lover's Guide to Dating	Alex	TV movie
2023	Christmas by Design	Charlotte	TV movie
2023	Christmas in Big Sky Country	Becca Collins	
2024	Falling Like Snowflakes	Teagan	TV movie
2024	Head Over Heels	Addison	TV movie
2025	Rodeo Christmas Romance	Emma Barrett	TV movie
2026	To Philly With Love	Emma	TV movie

Television roles
Year	Title	Role	Notes
2010	Unnatural History	Sally	Episode: "Beetlemania"
2014–2015	Spun Out	Stephanie Lyons	Main role (26 episodes)
2016–2021	Good Witch	Tara	Recurring role
2024	The Big Cigar	Jessica	3 episodes
