= Animism (TV series) =

Canadian animated television series

Animism is a Canadian animated television series that airs on the Aboriginal Peoples Television Network's APTN Kids block. Animated for APTN by Zeroes 2 Heroes, the series mixes First Nations mythology with urban fantasy concepts.

Development began in 2010. An alternate reality game titled Animism: The Sacred Sites debuted that year. The six-episode first season, Animism: The Gods' Lake, aired in 2013. A second season, Animism: Titan Falls, is in development.

== Background ==
It began as a developing alternate reality game in summer 2010 titled Animism: The Gods' Lake to promote the upcoming TV series still in development for APTN. It had an active site by autumn 2010 where the project was retitled Animism: The Sacred Sites. The ARG finally launched 1 January 2013 a few weeks before the show.

== Setting ==
The story begins in Grind City with environmental activists from Grind City University engaging in eco-terrorism against Grind City Futures, a local developer.

== Characters ==
=== The three supernatural siblings ===
- The Mother, dark-skinned earth goddess. Voiced by Jo Bates.
- The Wetiko (aliases Weiko, Weko, Weti and Wiko in CC) who mentors Chad. Voiced by Mark Oliver.
- The Trickster (also called Wisakedjak, originally named Nanabush) voiced by Jason Bryden or Jason Brydon

=== Humans ===
- Melody "Mel" Ravensfall. She becomes the emissary of the Mother's brother, the Trickster. She is 17 years old, and has a WordPress journal. Voiced by Jewel Staite.
- Duane Nation (alias Duan in CC), a brown-haired guy. Voiced by Jordan Waunch.
- Erin, a freckled girl with red hair with a white streak in it whose online alias is eekachik (later EekaChik). Voiced by Nicole Fairbrother. She stays behind with Wetiko and organizes an 'Occupy the Lake' movement to prevent development, continuing what they were shown doing in the episode 1 flashback as Mel and the boys go North to find the Trickster. She asks Wetiko to make her emissary 2.0 but he says she isn't much of a warrior. She creates a site called www.occupy-the-gods-lake.com to gather supporters to save the lake.
- Nico, a guy with spiky blonde hair, Mel's ex-boyfriend. Voiced by Andrew Francis.
- Chad Peterson, a corporate minion of the Wetiko. After being injured he is brought back in a state of undress remade as a Cyborg and is out for revenge. He has a profile on the Grid City Futures site where he is ranked below Herbert Bonnabee and above Rebecca Sanders. Voiced by Mark Oliver.
- Wendell voiced by Matthew Toner, who also voices Sports Announcer 1. He works in a guard station at Grind City Futures at the start of episode 1, where he is chatting with an online friend named Barry when Wapiti rescues Mel from Chad.
- Reporter voiced by David Attar, who also voices Sports Announcers 2
- waiter, fat male chef at Stevens Greasy Stain
- Apocalypse Biker, a muscular bearded moustached ginger possessed by Wetiko minion. Duane nicknames him 'Tiny' before he returns with his 3 allies: a blonde guy who is immediately taken out by Mel, another blonde in sunglasses, and a guy with a spike hat and moustache
- blonde and Brunette, online chatters who Erin shares video of talking animals with in episode 2. Others in episode 3 include ChiefZero who promotes Declan Grey's blog (www.DeclanGrey.Com) and Beata who promotes Duane's blog.
- Driver (per CC) reveals the town of Blighto was destroyed 40 years ago at end of episode 2. Mel calls him Mr. Grey (or Mr. Gray in CC) at the start of episode 3. In the end of episode 3 Nico finds a book with his picture in it and he comments Doctor Grey while reading the inscription Declan Gray. He has gray hair and is voiced by Michael Richard Dobson. The picture shows him younger with a girl who resembles Kakisa, the girl underwater that Mel met. Declan had commented earlier than he lost a woman special to him, causing Duane to get chided when he asked why he didn't just go visit her. Declan is monitored by an internet conspiracy theorist named ConspiracyTourist.
- Stevens is voiced by Trevor Devall who also does Nazi Biker
- Kakisa (alias Kisa in CC) is a girl Mel meets underwater in episode 3 who claims to be a former emissary like she was. She is seen in an old photo with Declan Grey, and is implied to be the special girl he lost. She is voiced by Joanna Gaskell who also does the ox Tokala.
- Another Random Guy voiced by Mark Oliver who does Chad/Wetiko
- Anchor Woman voiced by Jo Bates who also voices The Mother
- Whiz Kid voiced by Matthew Toner, is killed by Wetiko to punish Chad killing the Eldests without permission

=== Chad's henchmen ===
- Jacobite Terreur
- Captain Senza Cristos
- Zone, a digital entity described as a witch by Mel
- Ginger

=== Elders ===
The elders are a group of animals who Wapiti tries to convince to help Mel.

- Elder #1 and Frog are voiced by Nicole Fairbrother like Erin
- Elder #2 and The Moose are voiced by David Attar who does the biker
- Elder #3 is voiced by James R. Baylis same as Wapiti
- Elder #4 is voiced by Michael Richard Dobson, who also does Hive Mind and Declan Grey

=== Eldests ===
The eldests are a group of old men who look identical to one another. They serve the Wetigo until Chad kills them.

- Eldest #1 was voiced by Jordan Waunch (who voiced Duane)
- Eldest #2 was voiced by Andrew Francis (who voiced Nico)
- Eldest #3 was voiced by Joanna Gaskell (who voiced Tokala)

=== Others ===
- Wapiti (alias Wapii in CC), a tall muscular humanoid "crazy moose thing" who rescues the group in the first episode when they assault one of the Wetiko's minions in a corporation. Voiced by James R. Baylis. In the final episode when Chad spots Wapiti, not actually knowing his name, his bionic heads-up labels him "Moose-Man" when plotting to avenge his loss in their last encounter with a rematch using a merciless surprise attack with bare knuckles.
- Wapiti's son
- Tokala, a female fox. Voiced by Joanna Gaskell who also voices Owl.
- Mammoth is voiced by Michael Dobson who also does Hive Mind and Declan Grey.
- Giant Groundhog is voiced by Matthew Toner (who previously did Wendell and a sports announcer)

== Episodes ==
=== Season 0 ===
In 2010-2011 there was a miniseries of shorts that preceded the TV:

- Tease released 2 December 2010, 15 seconds long
1. There is a Tide 3 December 2010, 3:41 long
2. A Torch is Passed 6 December 2010, 5:48 long
3. Wetiko's Gambit 14 December 2010, 4:22 long
4. A Sleeper Awakens 20 December 2010, 7:57 long
5. Fire Cleanses 27 December 2010, 4:19 long
6. Dead Man Walking 8 January 2011, 4:48 long

=== Season 1 ===
- Pilot uploaded to YouTube 23 October 2013

| No. in season | Title | Original release date | APTN airdate |
|---|---|---|---|
| 1 | "Welcome To The Other World" "Welcome to the Other" | 7 January 2013 | 17 January 2016; Originally thought to be scheduled to debut January 9 or 16 |
Wapiti rescues Mel from Chad after her group attacks the corporation he works for. Wapiti reveals she is the new emissary for Trickster, just as he is for Mother and Chad is for Wetiko. Mel mentions her friends and Wapiti brings them.
| 2 | "The Hero's Journey… With Friends" | 14 January 2013 | 24 January 2016 |
Mel is accompanied by the boys to a ghost ton while Erin stays behind with Wapiti to protect the Lake from the corporation.
| 3 | "Under The Lake" "Under the Lake" | 21 January 2013 | 31 January 2016 |
The trio heads north, Mel discovers the previous emissary for the Trickster under the lake.
| 4 | "A Wander Moment" | 28 January 2013 | 7 February 2016 |
Duane is put in a trance by Wetiko when he answers his cellphone. Erin gets in a hacking war with a boy Chad hires to hijack her site. Nico makes out with Zone. Tokala is stopped by the Mother when she tries to attack Erin. Junior is disturbed as Chad "levels up" by killing and eating the geezers of the corporation board, as they won't get with the times and appreciate the impact the Internet has on shaping young minds. In the wild a giant groundhog and mammoth are encountered.
| 5 | "The Gathering Comes" | 4 February 2013 | 14 February 2016 |
| 6 | "The Battle of Gods' Lake" | 11 February 2013 | 21 February 2016 |

=== Season 2 ===
It is under development and was titled Animism: Titan Falls in 2014. The title resembles a preceding journal entry left by Declan Grey.

== Broadcast ==
The Aboriginal Peoples Television Network has hosted it since 2013.

== Funding ==
This was provided by the Bell Broadcast and New Media Fund (aka Bell Fund) along with British Columbia Film + Media, the British Columbia Film Incentive and Canada Media Fund, as well as the above-mentioned Shaw Rocket Fund.

== Official online game ==
This was online since 2012.

Part of it involved asking questions at a forum called Electric Antler, and getting news updates via Facebook, Twitter, and YouTube

== Official stories ==
The official Animism website's homepage features a guide to several stories from notable authors titled "The Book of the Emissaries". These canonical stories were composed during a fiction contest launched in 2012 and then some of them were endorsed as part of the lore. The java pages display an initial portion of the story with an illustration that links to the story's entirety on its own page. These tales include:

1. "Bad Water" by Kevin J. Anderson
2. "Dark Destiny, Bright Lady" by David Farland.
3. "Heart of Ice" by Elizabeth Aileen Dillon whose forenames are stylized "Beth Aieleen" as an Animism scribe
  - Dillon's other story "Trickster Faces a Wetiko" is considered part of the Canon but is not part of the Book of Emissaries.
4. "The First Farmer of Papua New Guinea" by David Ray
  - Ray's other story "The Last Words of Antonius Pius" is also considered canon but is not part of the Book of Emissaries.
5. "The Ladder Trick" by Nick Mamatas (Animism scribe)
6. "Rise of Man" by Sam Chandola (Book of the Emissaries calls this "The Rise of Man" by ssp1989)
7. "The Unicorn's Lament" by Cat Rambo (Animism scribe)
8. "Last Kisses" by Steven Savile (Animism scribe)

Although their stories do not appear as canon in the Book of the Emissaries, some other notable authors have also been singled out by the franchise in relation to the series:

- James Alan Gardner as an Animism scribe in relation to his story "Night Star".
- Nina Kiriki Hoffman as an Animism scribe
- Stephen Kotowych as an Animism scribe in relation to his story "Of His Wondrous Guile Sing, O Muse" which is part of the Canon

Less emphasized works (not part of the Book of Emissaries) are also featured in an anthology, some of which are designated "Canonical Works".

Theme filters divide the stories into 4 eras and 4 person types some of which were designated "winner"

- I. First Contact
- II. Early Civilization
- III. Heroes & Heroines
- IV. End of Days
- V. Famous Explorers
- VI. Legendary Warriors
- VII. Natural Disasters
- VIII. Great Thinkers

== Awards ==
- 3 October 2013 the show won a spot as one of the finalists in the 13–17 category for the Shaw Rocket Fund's special RocketPrize, but then lost to The Phantoms.

== See also ==
- Delta State (TV series) a similar Canadian show dealing with 20-somethings encountering paranormal powers in the modern world
