= Buddy Cole =

Buddy Cole may refer to:

- Buddy Cole (musician) (1916–1964), American jazz pianist and orchestra leader
- Buddy Cole (character), a character played by Scott Thompson on the sketch comedy TV series The Kids in the Hall
