= Waiting for Henry =

Compilation album by Mouth Congress
- Released: December 10, 2021
- Label: Captured Track

Waiting for Henry is a two-record compilation of 29 songs by the experimental rock band Mouth Congress. It was released on December 10, 2021, by Captured Track Records, and includes an 18-page full colour booklet detailing the band’s history. The discs were pressed on colour vinyl in both translucent tan and translucent blue.

The recordings on Waiting for Henry span the period between 1985 and 2016. Some were recorded in small studios or live, but most were 4-track recordings or cassette recordings. In conjunction with the album, Captured Tracks also released a 3-song compilation titled Ahhhhh, The Pollution!. The CD version of Waiting for Henry includes a hidden bonus track.

The band released videos for the songs Tactile, Be My Hole, and The People Have Spoken. The latter, a pro-choice anthem from 1986, got the attention of Rolling Stone Magazine, making it a high profile release for the band.
