= Mouth Congress (band) =

Canadian gay punk band

Mouth Congress was an experimental rock band featuring Paul Bellini and Scott Thompson, formed concurrently with their rise to fame as members of The Kids in the Hall. Mouth Congress took its name from the Sir Richard Burton translation of The Kama Sutra. It is the term Burton used for oral sex.

== Formation and early years ==
The band officially formed on November 4, 1984, when Paul Bellini rented a drum machine and invited friends to contribute to a recording project of improvised songs.

The band's first, and most frequent, collaborators were Rob Rowatt and Gord Disley, each playing either guitar, bass, or keyboards. Scott Thompson and Bellini were the singers. Later contributors included Brian Hiltz and Tom King, also playing guitar, bass, or keyboards. Several members of the Kids in the Hall occasionally contributed, most often Kevin McDonald, less frequently Mark McKinney and Dave Foley.

A year after Mouth Congress formed, Bruce McCulloch invited the band to open for his solo show in November 1985 at The Rivoli. This was the first time the band appeared onstage.

Mouth Congress rotated musicians as it kept active in both Toronto and Halifax. The band's drummer for live shows was Steve Keeping from 1985 to 2016, and later Ryan Elinsky from 2022 to 2025.

== Recordings and releases ==
In 2015, at the urging of Disley, Bellini uploaded the entire Mouth Congress catalogue to Bandcamp. Soon afterward the Bandcamp page was discovered by Mike Sniper of Captured Tracks Records in Brooklyn, NY.

Captured Tracks released a compilation album of Mouth Congress songs on December 10, 2021. Titled Waiting for Henry, the two-record set featured 29 tracks and an 18-page souvenir booklet. Previously, the company had released a 3-song EP titled Ahhhhh, The Pollution!.

== Reunion and later work ==
To promote the release, the band re-formed with Thompson and Bellini on vocals, Disley on bass, and Rowatt on guitar. To retain the band's authentic sound, percussion came from a Korg drum machine.

The band launched the record with several small shows in the Toronto area, and were also invited to perform at Philadelphia's PhilaMOCA on May 21^{st}, 2022, the band's only appearance in the United States.

This event included a screening of their self-produced documentary, titled Mouth Congress.

Soon afterward the band began writing new material for a future album. Valley of Song was recorded at Palace Sound in Toronto, with Bellini and Dylan Frankland producing, and was released as a two-record set from Comedy Records on October 31^{st}, 2024.

In conjunction with the album's release, Mouth Congress made music videos for the songs: Honk, Which Gabor?, Gerbil, Girl on the Mountain, Evangeline, In the Papers, and Masks.

== Discography ==
=== Albums ===
Waiting for Henry (2021) Valley of Song (2024)

=== EPs ===
Ahhhhh, The Pollution!

== Documentary ==
Mouth Congress is a self-produced documentary about the band.
