= Paul Bellini =

Canadian comedian (born 1959)

- Born: September 12, 1959 (age 67); Timmins, Ontario, Canada
- Occupations: Comedy writer, television actor
- Years active: 1990–present

Paul Bellini (born September 12, 1959) is a Canadian comedy writer and television actor best known for his work on the comedy series The Kids in the Hall and This Hour Has 22 Minutes.

== The Kids in the Hall ==
Paul Bellini attended York University in 1978, where he received an Honours B.A. in Film. It was there, at the Vanier College residence, that he met Scott Thompson, an acting student who later became a member of The Kids in the Hall. For the troupe's eponymous TV series, which ran from 1989 to 1995, Bellini served primarily as Thompson's writing partner.

Their principal creation during this period was monologist Buddy Cole. Thompson preferred the character to be sexual and sassy, whereas Bellini emphasized the 'magical whimsy' of the character. The character and his monologues appeared frequently on both the television show and in live appearances, and is still active in Thompson's touring repertoire.

During the same era, Bellini and Thompson also collaborated with various musicians in an experimental rock band called Mouth Congress. Their early songs were silly, often about things like cigarettes or wigs, but later they delved into deeper topics like manhood and sexuality. They performed frequently at The Rivoli in Toronto, until the demands of making a television show took over Thompson's free time. Bellini carried on, releasing two solo albums - The Northland's Own (1995) and Put Paul First (2000), both available on Bandcamp.

Bellini's on-screen presence in The Kids in the Hall began when the producers suggested the troupe conduct a contest to determine the demographics of the show's fan base. Turning down such conventional ideas as meeting the Kids or a cash prize, the members of KITH decided the 'prize' would be Paul Bellini wearing only a towel.

Thus the 'Touch Paul Bellini' contest was born, wherein the winner was granted the chance to gently poke Bellini with a stick. This contest took Bellini to Florida, New Brunswick, Ohio and Ottawa to meet the winners. To win, a viewer had to draw a picture of Bellini emerging from a giant box of condoms. During these and other appearances on the show, Bellini would often wander into a sketch silently, thus becoming the show's absurd mascot. At the end of the final episode, after the cast is buried alive during the end credits, the usually silent Bellini approaches the grave, turns to the camera, and for the first time ever, he speaks, saying, "Thank God that's finally over." He then picks up a flower and proceeds to dance on the grave.

Bellini was subsequently a writer and show runner for This Hour Has 22 Minutes, winning three Gemini Awards and a Writers Guild of Canada award as part of that show's writing team. He was also one of the writers of two independent films made with Josh Levy, the 1998 film Hayseed and 2003's doUlike2watch. Levy and Bellini also collaborated on the television series Locker Room (2003-2004) for PrideVision in Canada.

In 1998, Bellini was the subject of an autobiographical documentary, Bellini's Drive, which among other things explained his thoughts on being the second-most famous person from Timmins - the first being Shania Twain. In the same year, he and Thompson co-authored Buddy Babylon, the comedic autobiography of renowned Kids in the Hall character Buddy Cole. It was published by Dell Trade Paperbacks in 1998, and in 2022 was re-released as an Audible audiobook, with Thompson reading the text as Buddy Cole.

Following his time with This Hour Has 22 Minutes, Bellini was a columnist for fab, a gay magazine in Toronto, for 12 years. In 2012, he self-published The Fab Columns, a compilation of his writings for the magazine. Over the course of 12 years he interviewed such luminaries as Bea Arthur, Elaine Stritch, Bob Mackie, Tab Hunter, Peter Berlin, Jack Wrangler, Sandra Bernhard, John Waters, Tura Satana, Buck Angel, and Ken Russell, as well as dozens of Toronto-based figures in the queer community.

In 2015, Bellini and Thompson uploaded all their Mouth Congress recordings to Bandcamp, bringing them to the attention of Brooklyn-based record label Captured Tracks. A compilation of the band's songs, called Waiting for Henry, was released as a two-disc set in December 2021, and the band reunited the following year for several live shows to promote the release. They launched a successful Kickstarter campaign to fund a feature-length documentary film about the band. The film, Mouth Congress, premiered at the Kingston Canadian Film Festival in 2021.

The band's final show took place on August 22, 2025, at the Ted Rogers Hot Docs Cinema.

Inspired by the reaction to the Mouth Congress film, Bellini embarked on an ambitious project in which he would make two feature films per year, starring his various comedy writing students, shot entirely on iPhones and edited with Final Cut Pro. The films are: An Irrelephant (2018), Gone, with the Wind (2018), Christmas Sucks (2019), The Eplet Triplets (2019), Bergmanesque (2020), The Chubby Children Charities (2020, shot entirely on Zoom during the Covid-19 lockdown), Hi-Tech Detectives (2021), This City Is Insidious (2021), Biopic (2022), auditions for Her Nightmare (2023), and A Day in the Life of Dr. Borgo Pinti (2025).

All the films were uploaded to YouTube under the production company banner $100Cdn Productions, so-named when one of his actors joked that the average budget for each film was, 'about a hundred dollars.'

In November 2024, the Kids in the Hall performed a benefit for Bellini at Toronto's Danforth Music Hall to help Bellini through his treatment for multiple myeloma.

He has since been cleared of the cancer.

Currently, Bellini teaches sketch comedy at Humber College in Toronto. He has also taught courses for The Second City in the past.

== Writing credits ==
- The Kids in the Hall (HBO / CBC / Broadway Video Productions), 1991-1995, writer and occasional cast member
- Out There in Hollywood (The English Channel / Comedy Central), 1995, writer
- This Hour Has 22 Minutes (CBC / Salter Street Productions)1995-1999, writer and show runner
- The Bette Show (CBC / Topsail Productions) 1997-1998, producer
- Hayseed (Wayward Girl Productions) 1998, screenwriter
- Buddy Babylon, (Dell Trade Paperbacks), 1998, written with Scott Thompson
- Locker Room (On the Down Low Productions / PrideVision) 2002, co-producer, writer, and cast member
- Yvon of the Yukon (YTV / Studio B Productions) 2000, staff writer
- doUlike2watch (On the Down Low Productions) 2003, screenwriter
- Roots (NFB), 2005, screenwriter
- P.R. (CBC / Sullivan Entertainment) 1999, staff writer
- Futz! (YTV / 9 Story Productions) 2007, story editor
- She's the Mayor (Vision TV / Hungry Eyes Productions) 2011, writer and story editor
- My Dad the Rock Star (YTV / Nelvana) 2003, story editor
- The Fab Columns, 2012, author
- Monsterpiece, 2021, author

== Film and television appearances ==
- Kids in the Hall: Brain Candy (Paramount Films), 1996
- Kids in the Hall: Death Comes to Town (Accent Entertainment), 2010
- The Kids in the Hall (HBO / CBC), 1989 - 1995
- Kids in the Hall (Amazon Prime), 2022
- The Pee Pee Poo Poo Man (eh24 Productions), 2024
- Tallboyz (CBC), 2019
- Candles, Snow and Mistletoe (CBC), 1993

== Awards ==
- 1996 and 1997 - Won Gemini Award for Best Writing in a Comedy or Variety Program or Series for This Hour Has 22 Minutes
- 1999 - Won Gemini Award for Best Music, Variety Program or Series for This Hour Has 22 Minutes New Year's Eve Special
- 1997 - Won Writer's Guide of Canada Award for Excellence in Writing for This Hour Has 22 Minutes
- 1998 - Nominated for Best Writing in a Comedy or Variety Program or Series for This Hour Has 22 Minutes
- 1993, 1994, 1995 - Nominated for Primetime Emmy Awards for Outstanding Individual Achievement in Writing for a Variety or Music Program for The Kids in the Hall
- 1995, 1996 - Nominated for Gemini Awards for Best Writing in a Comedy or Variety Program or Series for The Kids in the Hall
- 1993 - Nominated for Best Comedy Series, Cable ACE award for The Kids in the Hall
