= Hayseed (1997 film) =

1997 Canadian comedy film

- Directed by: Josh Levy; Andrew Hayes
- Written by: Josh Levy; Paul Bellini; Steve McKay
- Produced by: Laura MacDonald; Martha Kehoe
- Starring: Jamie Shannon; Deborah Theaker; Scott Thompson; Mark McKinney
- Cinematography: Jason Tan
- Edited by: Andrea Folprecht
- Music by: Robert Scott
- Distributed by: Salter Street Films
- Release date: September 11, 1997 (TIFF)
- Running time: 93 minutes
- Country: Canada
- Language: English

Hayseed is a Canadian comedy film, directed by Josh Levy and Andrew Hayes and released in 1997. The film stars Jamie Shannon as Gordon, a naive "hayseed" from a small town in Northern Ontario who travels to Toronto after receiving a tip from a psychic that his lost dog is in the city, and meets a bizarre cast of characters, from prostitutes to gay sex slave traders, during his trip.

The film's cast includes Deborah Theaker, Elva Mai Hoover, Dan Lett, Daniel MacIvor, Scott Thompson, Mark McKinney, Maria Vacratsis, Dan Redican and Bruce LaBruce. The soundtrack included songs by Andy Kim, Babybird, By Divine Right, Local Rabbits, Odds, Pansy Division, Rusty and Treble Charger.

The film premiered at the 1997 Toronto International Film Festival, and was subsequently broadcast on television by Citytv.

== Critical response ==
In his 2003 book A Century of Canadian Cinema, Gerald Pratley called the film "a low-budget fairy-tale romp and a welcome change from other films claiming to be comedies". Writing for the Toronto Star, Mitchel Raphael positioned Levy alongside LaBruce, playwright Brad Fraser and novelist Todd Klinck as one of a wave of "new degenerates" whose work challenged rather than assimilating into the "gay establishment".

Thomas Waugh's MediaQueer site describes the film as a "Candide-style parable" which "somehow missed entering the Canadian canon, perhaps because the fresh, folksy but sex-savvy satire of innocence adrift was hard to pigeonhole as either queer or otherwise, or because the Egoyan-Cronenberg tastemakers prefer to keep our frothy comic sensibilities on television and reserve the Art Cinema for world-heavy themes."
