= Scott Thompson (actor) =

Canadian comedian and actor (born 1959)

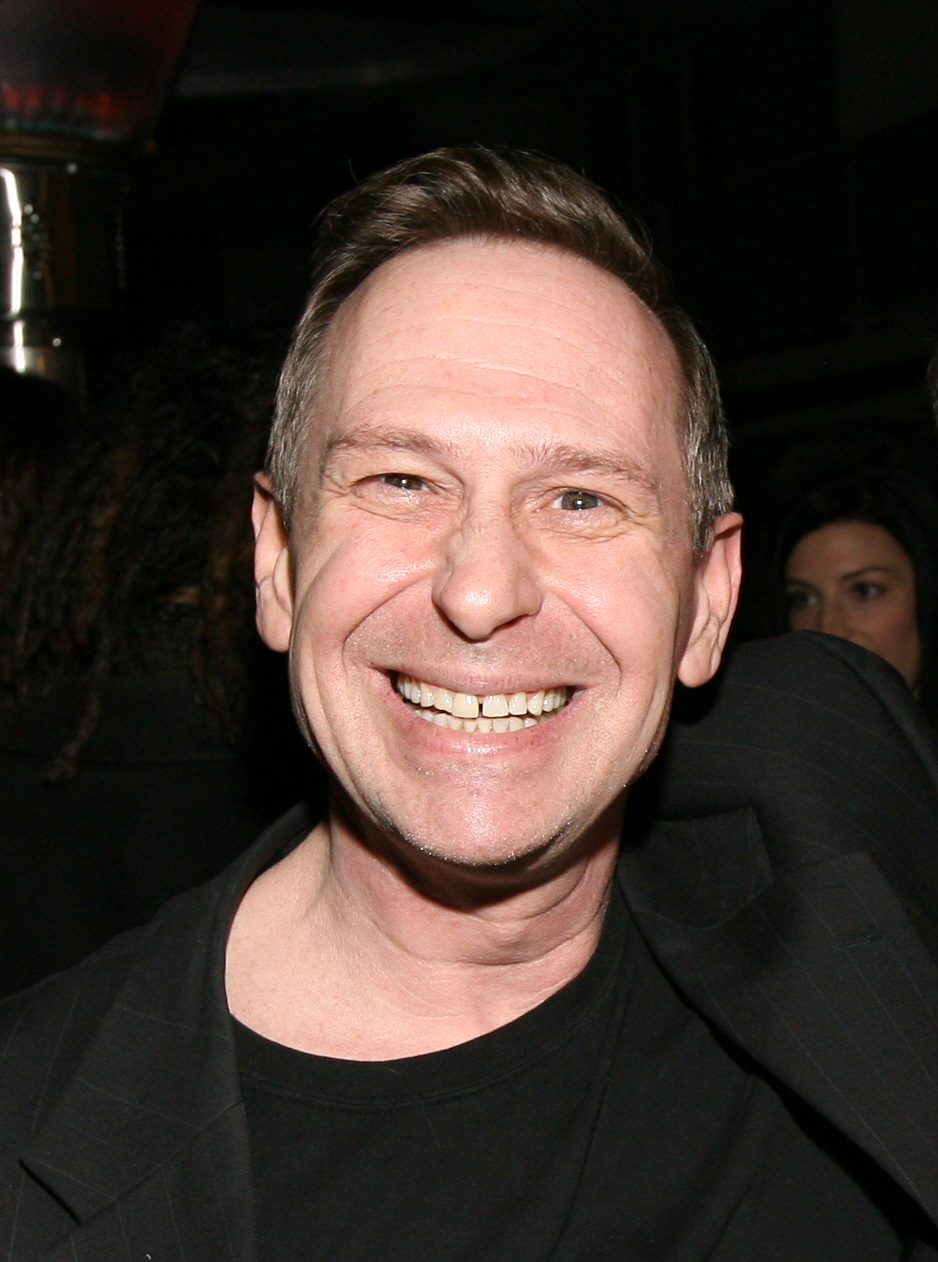
- Thompson in 2012
- Born: John Scott Thompson; June 12, 1959 (age 67); North Bay, Ontario, Canada
- Occupations: Actor, comedian, writer
- Years active: 1980–present
- Website: newscottlandland.com

John Scott Thompson (born June 12, 1959) is a Canadian actor and comedian, best known as member of the comedy troupe The Kids in the Hall and for playing Brian on The Larry Sanders Show.

== Early life ==
Thompson was born in North Bay, Ontario, and grew up in Brampton. Named for his uncle, he later dropped the name "John" to simplify his name for the stage. He is the second oldest of the five children in his family.

He attended Brampton Centennial Secondary School, and was a witness to the 1975 Brampton Centennial Secondary School shooting. He enrolled at York University but in his third year was asked to leave for being "disruptive". He joined the comedy troupe The Love Cats, where he met Mark McKinney.

== Career ==
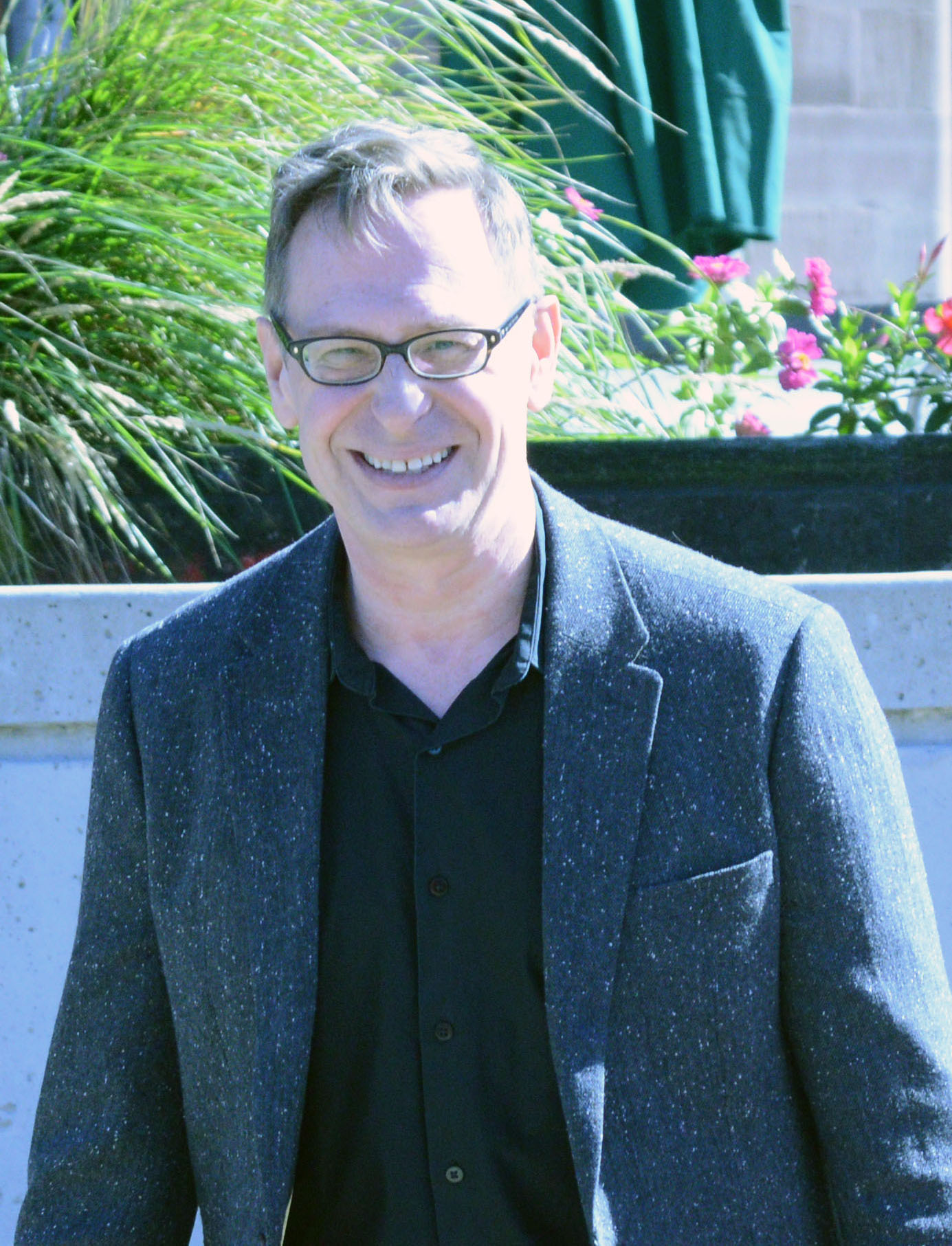
Thompson at his Brampton Arts Walk of Fame star unveiling, 2014

In 1984, Thompson became a member of The Kids in the Hall, whose eponymous sketch comedy series aired starting 1989 on the CBC in Canada and on HBO in the United States, but moved to CBS for its fourth and fifth seasons. Openly gay, Thompson became best known on the show for his monologues as "alpha queen" socialite Buddy Cole, and his appearances as Queen Elizabeth II, secretary Cathy, businessman Danny Husk, suburban housewife Fran, actress Francesca Fiore, and the demented old man in the popular "Love and Sausages" sketch.

Concurrently with The Kids in the Hall, Thompson and his writing colleague Paul Bellini collaborated in a queercore punk band called Mouth Congress.

During the mid-1990s Thompson ran an interactive website, developed by his younger brother Craig and called ScottLand. It had a live-chat area, voting and comedy espionage and sold Buddy Cole T-shirts and video tapes of comedy sketches.

He also appeared regularly on The Larry Sanders Show as Hank Kingsley's personal assistant Brian, and made numerous guest appearances on other television series, including Politically Incorrect, The Late Show, Late Night with Conan O'Brien, and Train 48. Thompson hosted a reality television program in Canada called My Fabulous Gay Wedding. Thompson defended Mordecai Richler's novel Cocksure in Canada Reads 2006. He has continued to tour, and act in numerous movies and on TV. He joined the other Kids in the Hall to tour as recently as 2014, guest-starred in two episodes of Reno 911!, and performed in the project Death Comes to Town (2010) with fellow KITH members Dave Foley, Bruce McCulloch, Mark McKinney, and Kevin McDonald. He had a recurring role in the NBC series Hannibal, playing Jimmy Price, an FBI crime scene investigator.

Thompson published a humour book, Buddy Babylon: The Autobiography of Buddy Cole, and a graphic novel, The Hollow Planet, based on characters from The Kids in the Hall. He has written and performed two one-man shows. In 2014, Thompson, in character as Buddy Cole, did a series of reports on The Colbert Report as the program's correspondent for the 2014 Winter Olympics.

In 2015, Bellini and Thompson uploaded all of their Mouth Congress recordings to Bandcamp, and they reunited the following year for several live shows to promote the release. They launched a Kickstarter campaign to fund a documentary film about the band; that film, Mouth Congress, premiered at the Kingston Canadian Film Festival in 2021.

Around this time, Thompson performed his Buddy Cole monologues at the Portland Queer Comedy Festival.

In 2018, Thompson launched Après le Déluge – The Buddy Cole Monologues, a one-man show in character as Buddy Cole.

== Personal life ==
=== 2000 home attack ===
In 2000, Thompson was living with his boyfriend, French documentarian Joel Soler. Soler had smuggled footage out of Iraq to make an E! News-style satiric political documentary comedy, Uncle Saddam, about the eccentricities in the home life of Saddam Hussein and his family, which bubbled behind Hussein's dictatorial façade. Thompson wrote the narration for the movie, which was read by actor Wallace Langham. Following the movie's release, Thompson and Soler's West Hollywood home was firebombed on November 1, 2000. Thompson has discussed the details of this incident in interviews with Jesse Brown of Canadaland and fellow Canadian comic Elvira Kurt, as being inspiration for his future show The Lowest Show on Earth. In the interview with Kurt, he says of the attack, "We were sleeping and a group came to our home. They filled our giant garbage cans with gasoline and set them on fire on our front lawn. They had buckets of red paint. They covered the house with it so it dripped off like blood. They put a note in the front hall that said, 'In the name of Allah, the merciful and compassionate, burn this Satanic film or you will be dead'. They underlined "dead" just in case we weren't freaked out enough".

This, along with many other incidents throughout Thompson's life, including the 1975 shooting at his Brampton high school, led him to process incidents of terror on micro- and macrocosmic levels through his one-man comedy show The Lowest Show on Earth. Thompson went on tour with this show and secured a spot in New York, off-Broadway. The posters—featuring Thompson lying supine on the ground with a big wad of semen dripping down the side of his face—went up around the city on September 10, 2001. The following day, the terrorist attacks on the World Trade Center made the one-man show's difficult material impossible to talk about.

=== Health ===
In March 2009, Thompson was diagnosed with B-cell non-Hodgkin's gastric lymphoma. He completed six rounds of chemotherapy and one month of radiation, and reached a cancer-free status.

== Filmography ==
=== Film ===
Year	Title	Role	Notes
1985	Head Office	Man Outside Office Building	Uncredited
1989	Millennium	Controller	
1994	Super 8½	Buddy Cole	
1996	Kids in the Hall: Brain Candy	Baxter / Mrs. Hurdicure / Wally	
1997	Hijacking Hollywood	Russell	
1997	Hayseed	J.D. Wood	
1999	Mickey Blue Eyes	FBI Agent Lewis	
2001	Tart	Kenny	
2002	Run Ronnie Run!	Scott Thompson	
2003	Nobody Knows Anything!	Mechanic	
2004	My Baby's Daddy	Cashier	
2004	Ham & Cheese	Floyd	
2005	The Pacifier	Director	
2006	Another Gay Movie	Andy's Dad	
2008	Another Gay Sequel: Gays Gone Wild!	Andy's Dad	
2014	Patch Town	Executive No. 2	
2017	Don't Talk to Irene	Barrett	
2018	The Go-Getters	Young Guy	
2023	Zombie Town	Andy	
2023	My Animal	Marcel	
2025	Night of the Zoopocalypse	Ash	(Voice)

=== Television ===
Year	Title	Role	Notes
1987	Street Legal	Director	Episode: "Desperate Alibi"
1988, 1990	The Campbells	Red	2 episodes
1988–1995, 2022	The Kids in the Hall	Various characters	Main role
1995–1998	The Larry Sanders Show	Brian	35 episodes
1998	Tracey Takes On...	Matthew	Episode: "Religion"
1998	More Tales of the City	Arlington Luce	Episode #1.2
1998	Veronica's Closet	Scotty	Episode: "Veronica's Great Model Search"
1999	Jesse	Cecil	Episode: "Cecil, the Angry Postman"
1999	Star Trek: Voyager	Tomin	Episode: "Someone to Watch Over Me"
2000	Happily Ever After: Fairy Tales for Every Child	Prince Rip / Rabbit	Episode: "The Frog Princess"
2001	Dharma & Greg	David	Episode: "Kitty Dearest"
2001	Further Tales of the City	Arlington Luce	3 episodes
2001	Providence	Elliot Anderman	9 episodes
2002–2004	RoboRoach	Rube	52 episodes
2002	The Red Sneakers	Aldo	Television film
2003	Odd Job Jack	Dr. Prof. Randalf	Episode: "Lord of the 3-Ring Binder"
2003	Touched by an Angel	Herbert	Episode: "The Show Must Not Go On"
2003	Made in Canada	Charles Strong	Episode: "Richard's Brother"
2003	Lilo & Stitch: The Series	Mrs. Pleakley	2 episodes
2003–2018	The Simpsons	Grady	4 episodes
2004	Prom Queen: The Marc Hall Story	Lonnie Winn	Television film
2004	Aqua Teen Hunger Force	Dusty Gozongas	Episode: "Dusty Gozongas"
2004	Grounded for Life	Dr. Kagan	Episode: "Psycho Therapy"
2005	Puppets Who Kill	Jules Cashear	Episode: "Cuddles the Artist"
2005	Burnt Toast	Tim	Television film
2005–2006	G-Spot	Counsellor / Group Leader	2 episodes
2006	The Jane Show	Dr. Tyler Milgram	Episode: "Should Have Said"
2007	Fawlty Tower Oxnard	The Major	3 episodes
2007–2008	Carpoolers	Tom / Rich Carpooler	4 episodes
2009	Tim and Eric Awesome Show, Great Job!	Ricardo	Episode: "Hair"
2009	Reno 911!	Gary Werner	2 episodes
2010	The Kids in the Hall: Death Comes to Town	Various roles	8 episodes
2010	The Soup	Grownup Pageant Princess	1 episode
2011	ACME Saturday Night	Guest Host	Episode: "Scott Thompson"
2011	She's the Mayor	Walter Sussman	Episode: "Gimme Shelter"
2011	Dream Crushers	Scott	2 episodes
2011–2012	Wingin' It	Agent 45	3 episodes
2012	Comedy Bar	Swa S. Tika	Episode: "Episode 2"
2013	Rocket Monkeys	Baron von Monkey	2 episodes
2013	Fugget About It	Queen Elizabeth II	Episode: "Royally Screwed"
2013	But I'm Chris Jericho!	AJ Mirkin	10 episodes
2013–2015	Hannibal	Jimmy Price	27 episodes
2014	Working the Engels	Harry Le Maire	Episode: "Meet Irene Horowitz"
2014	Spun Out	Sebastian	Episode: "Middle Aged Men in the Hall"
2014	Rocky Road	Reverend	Television film
2014	Dark Rising	Skcraab	5 episodes
2014	Odd Squad	Professor Square	Episode: "Crime at Shapely Manor"
2014	The Stanley Dynamic	Mr. Blount	Episode: "The Stanley Feud"
2015	Degrassi: The Next Generation	Mr. Bane	4 episodes
2015	Degrassi: Don't Look Back	Mr. Bane	Mr. Bane
2015	SuperMansion	Kid Victory	Episode: "A Shop in the Dark"
2016	Man Seeking Woman	Tiresias	Episode: "Balloon"
2016	Bruno & Boots: Go Jump in the Pool	Headmaster Hartley	Television film
2016	Holiday Joy	Mr. Elderberry	Television film
2016	HumanTown	Dr. Photon	Television film
2016	The Amazing Gayl Pile	Mike	3 episodes
2017	What Would Sal Do?	Father Luke	8 episodes
2017	American Gods	Kind Man	Episode: "Head Full of Snow"
2017	Pitch Off with Doug Benson	Guest	Episode: "Pitch "Woody Allen Disney Movie" to Doug."
2017	American Dad!	Henchman	Episode: "The Long Bomb"
2018	Let's Get Physical	Herbert Langworth	Episode: "Paybacks a Bitch"
2018	Conan	Queen Elizabeth II	1 episode
2019	Save Me	Dan	Episode: "First Call"
2019	Snowbound for Christmas	Jean-Luc	Television film
2021	Hey Lady!	Judge	Episode #1.8
2022–2023	Pinecone & Pony	Thistle (voice)	Recurring role
2022	Sort Of	Bryce	guest star 4 episodes
2022	Shoresy	Shoresy's foster father	Episode #1.4
2023	FUBAR	Dr. Louis Pfeffer	Recurring role
2025	Murdoch Mysteries	Richmond St. Clair	Episode: "Sugar Plum Murdoch"

== Other works ==
- Buddy Babylon: The Autobiography of Buddy Cole (with Paul Bellini) in 1998, a humour novel; ISBN 0-440-50828-2
- The Lowest Show on Earth, a 2001 one-man show produced in Toronto
- Scottastrophe, 2006 multimedia show
- The Hollow Planet, a graphic novel by Scott Thompson, Kyle Morton, and Stephan Nilson, from IDW Publishing, featuring Thompson's The Kids in the Hall character Danny Husk
