= Mouth Congress =

- Directed by: Paul Bellini; Scott Thompson
- Written by: Paul Bellini; Scott Thompson
- Produced by: Josh Levy; Robi Levy; Scott Thompson
- Starring: Paul Bellini; Scott Thompson
- Cinematography: Josh Levy; Robi Levy
- Edited by: Paul Bellini
- Music by: Paul Bellini
- Production company: Levy Brothers
- Release date: March 12, 2021 (KCFF)
- Running time: 68 minutes
- Country: Canada
- Language: English

Mouth Congress is a Canadian film directed by Paul Bellini and Scott Thompson, released in 2021. Blending both documentary and fictional elements, the film is a portrait of Mouth Congress, the gay punk band Bellini and Thompson formed concurrently with their rise to fame as members of The Kids in the Hall.

The genesis of the film began in 2011, when Bellini discovered a box of old videotapes of the band’s shows from the 1980s.

The performances, mostly from The Rivoli and other Queen Street clubs, were theatrical, utilizing costumes and comedy segments. One show featured Thompson and Bellini wearing several layers of clothing, and then stripping down gradually as they sang.

In 2012, Thompson and Bellini began filming interviews with the other band members, but the mix of interviews and archival footage left them cold. Then Josh Levy, a friend and filmmaker who had directed Hayseed (1998) and doUlike2watch (2002) suggested they perform a reunion concert and use the process of preparing the show as a framework for the documentary.

The performance was taped on February 21st, 2016, at The Rivoli. It featured Rob Rowatt on guitar, Tom King on bass, Steve Keeping on drums, and featured guest comedian Hunter Collins and performer Josh Bentley-Swan. The footage was videotaped by Josh Levy, Robi Levy, and Adam Zivo. The Levy brothers also covered all the rehearsals and songwriting sessions, as well as a costume fitting (featuring a cameo from gay porn star Skyy Knox).

Scott Thompson hired producer Dan Galea to produce a framework segment, featuring Kid in the Hall Kevin McDonald as an uncle telling the story of Mouth Congress to his 8-year-old niece, played by Abigail Nadeau.

Though largely self-financed, the film received over $20,000 in completion funds through a Kickstarter campaign in 2018.

The film had been scheduled to premiere at the Kingston Canadian Film Festival in 2020, but after the festival was cancelled due to the COVID-19 pandemic in Canada, it had its premiere at the 2021 festival.

The Mouth Congress documentary has since received small screenings at Cinecycle, the Henderson Brew Pub, and most recently at the Ted Rogers Hot Docs Cinema, all in Toronto, as well as receiving screenings in both Brooklyn and Philadelphia.

Currently the film has no distributor.

Concurrently with the film's release, Thompson and Bellini released a three-song single, their first-ever release as Mouth Congress, for the 2021 Record Store Day. They followed up in December with Waiting for Henry, a compilation of recordings from throughout their career.
