= List of The Kids in the Hall episodes =

The following is an episode list for the television show The Kids in the Hall. 109 episodes have been produced, plus 9 compilation episodes.

Some episodes had two versions, an American version and a Canadian version, often with alternate sketches. This episode guide is based on the official DVD releases. The first three seasons use the American versions of the episodes because HBO would allow more to be shown than the CBC. Seasons 4 and 5 use the Canadian versions because the CBC allowed more to be shown than CBS.

The series was picked up for a sixth season in 2020 by Amazon Prime Video; it premiered May 13, 2022.

== Series overview ==
| Season | Episodes | Originally released | | |
| Season | Episodes | First released | Last released | Network |
|---|---|---|---|---|
| Pilot | | October 16, 1988 | | CBC Television |
| 1 | 20 | October 24, 1989 | May 15, 1990 | CBC Television |
| 2 | 20 | September 25, 1990 | April 30, 1991 | CBC Television |
| 3 | 20 | October 1, 1991 | April 28, 1992 | CBC Television |
| 4 | 20 | October 6, 1993 | May 18, 1994 | CBC Television |
| 5 | 21 | October 5, 1994 | April 15, 1995 | CBC Television |
| 6 | 8 | May 13, 2022 | | Amazon Prime Video |

== Episodes ==
=== Pilot (1988) ===
| No. | Title | Original release date |
|---|---|---|
| – | "Pilot" | October 16, 1988 |
Sketches: You Millionaires!, Guys On A Break, Crush Your Head Part 1, Brian's Bombshell, Cabbage Head, Crying Guy, Crush Your Head Part 2, Rusty, David Foley's Power/Mark McKinney's Confession, Crush Your Head Part 3, But Do You Love *Me*?, Buddy Cole, Naked For Jesus, Reg, Crush Your Head Part 4

=== Season 1 (1989–90) ===
| No. overall | No. in season | Title | Original release date |
|---|---|---|---|
| 1 | 1 | "Episode 1" | October 24, 1989 |
Sketches: Call Girls, The Eradicator, Ballet, Crushing Your Head Part 2, Cause of Cancer, Pear, Kathie and the Blues Guy, Crushing Your Head Part 3
| 2 | 2 | "Episode 2" | October 31, 1989 |
Sketches: Thirty Helens 1, Sketch Comedy, Thirty Helens 2, Cabbage Head: Restaurant, Tractor, Sarcastic Guy, Buddy's Better, Thirty Helens 3, Womyn
| 3 | 3 | "Episode 3" | November 7, 1989 |
Sketches: Gunslinger II, Gorilla, Hey Man, Citizen Kane, Contact Lenses, Hey Man 2, Salty Ham, Hey Man 3
| 4 | 4 | "Episode 4" | November 14, 1989 |
Sketches: Déjà Vu, Asshole, The Daves I Know, Menstruation, House Rules, The Dinner, Sick of the Swiss, Country Doctor
| 5 | 5 | "Episode 5" | November 21, 1989 |
Sketches: Indian Drum, Geralds, Crushing Disco 1, Good Grampa, Explore Scott, Are Extraterrestrials Dull?, Elvis, Crushing Disco 2
| 6 | 6 | "Episode 6" | December 5, 1989 |
Sketches: Thirty Helens 1, Bored Robbers, Running Faggot, Thirty Helens 2, Flogging, The Trucker, Can I Keep Him?
| 7 | 7 | "Episode 7" | December 12, 1989 |
Sketches: Hotel La Rut, Plummet, Hotel La Rut 2, First Poem, Fletcher Christian, Hotel La Rut 3, Joymakers
| 8 | 8 | "Episode 8" | December 19, 1989 |
Sketches: Ping Pong, The Vacation, Ping Pong 2, Chain Gang, Banker Doesn't Like Us, Dinosaurs, Ping Pong 3, Tony Comes to Dinner, Banker Doesn't Like Us 2
| 9 | 9 | "Episode 9" | January 2, 1990 |
Sketches: A Place to Die, Secretaries, A Place to Die 2, Preacher, Weston, A Place to Die 3, Teddy Bears' Picnic
| 10 | 10 | "Episode 10" | January 9, 1990 |
Sketches: Hoopla, McGuillicutty and Green, Wake Up!, MacIntyre Name, One Step at a Time, Nobody Likes Us, McGuillicuty and Kurosawa, Three for the Moon
| 11 | 11 | "Episode 11" | January 16, 1990 |
Sketches: Night of the Living Dead, Can Never Go Home, Thirty Helens Coleslaw, Under Control, Gunslinger I, Star-Crossed Lovers, Thirty Helens Hawaii, Barbershop
| 12 | 12 | "Episode 12" | January 23, 1990 |
Sketches: Turning Over, Mood Swing, Billy Dreamer 1, Folk Music, Who's Gay in Hollywood?, Billy Dreamer 2, Skoora!
| 13 | 13 | "Episode 13" | January 30, 1990 |
Sketches: Signs of Loneliness, Networking, Lopez 1, Fat Hitch-Hiker, Lopez 2, No Regrets, The Lamp, Lopez 3, Indian Woman, Lopez 4
| 14 | 14 | "Episode 14" | April 3, 1990 |
Sketches: Editors Intro, Editors (Film), Break Up, I Lied, Dull Death, I'm A Cat, My Routine, Schoolroom, Editors Finale
| 15 | 15 | "Episode 15" | April 10, 1990 |
Sketches: Death Row, White Guy, Crazy Love, Buddy's Island, Captain Alan, Mechanic, Baby
| 16 | 16 | "Episode 16" | April 17, 1990 |
Sketches: The Floater, Is He?, Thirty Helens: Pens, Manny Coon, Thirty Helens: Minds, Bass Player, Compensation, Thirty Helens: Disagree, Power of My Cock
| 17 | 17 | "Episode 17" | April 24, 1990 |
Sketches: Boo!, Dracula, The Middle, Crushing Girlfriend, Mass Murderer, B & K, Beautiful Women
| 18 | 18 | "Episode 18" | May 1, 1990 |
Sketches: Love Me, Stinky Pink, Premise Beach, Crouton, Olympics, Premise Beach 2, Shitty Soup, She's Gone
| 19 | 19 | "Episode 19" | May 8, 1990 |
Sketches: Hey Baby, Island Boys, Can't Kill Rock, Tarantula, Cat's Away, Mutilated, Car Ride, Owww
| 20 | 20 | "Episode 20" | May 15, 1990 |
Sketches: Fat Man, How We Met, Thirty Helens: Photos, Bank People, Double Date, Buddy is Canadian, Buddy Holly, Thirty Helens: Helens, Dr. Seuss Bible

=== Season 2 (1990–91) ===
| No. overall | No. in season | Title | Original release date |
|---|---|---|---|
| 21 | 1 | "Episode 1" | September 25, 1990 |
Sketches: Spring, Comfortable, Trucker #2, Hard Day, Off Swingin', The Doctor, Bobby and the Devil
| 22 | 2 | "Episode 2" | October 2, 1990 |
Sketches: Cops: O Canada, Trapper, Cabbage Head: Old Friends, Not Working Out 1, The Loner, Not Working Out 2, Simon and Hecubus, Not Working Out 3, Girls of Summer
| 23 | 3 | "Episode 3" | October 9, 1990 |
Sketches: Mark's Newscast: Paper Airplanes, Sizzler & Sizzler, Pageant, Tony and Nick, Mark's Newscast: Meech Lake, A Little Something, Phone, Touch Paul Bellini Contest
| 24 | 4 | "Episode 4" | October 16, 1990 |
Sketches: Nutty Bunnies, Queer Nation, Cops: Uniform, Excellent Dinner, Cops: Stanze, The Parrot, Cops: Running Naked, Customer, On the Run
| 25 | 5 | "Episode 5" | October 23, 1990 |
Sketches: The Jury, Cops: Shootout, Prisoner, Sizzler and the Bank, Cops 17: 211 In Progress, Chicken Lady, Drugs Are Bad, Cops: Prisoner, Clean Sheets, Justice
| 26 | 6 | "Episode 6" | October 30, 1990 |
Sketches: Second Novel, Baboon, Hair Loss, Conversation, Buddy: Wood Nymph, Anecdote, Groovy Teacher
| 27 | 7 | "Episode 7" | November 6, 1990 |
Sketches: Lady is a Tramp, Meet the Geralds, I'm English, Lady is a Tramp Part II, Painting A Chair, The Lack O Trust Blues, Lady is A Tramp Part III
| 28 | 8 | "Episode 8" | November 13, 1990 |
Sketches: I Can't Play the Piano, Democracy, Tampa Bay, Cops: Goose, Freak, Cops: Tony Baldwin, Seminar, Celebrity, Liposuction
| 29 | 9 | "Episode 9" | December 4, 1990 |
Sketches: Cops: Dream, Crushing Hospital, Cops: Dad, Daddy Drank, The Leash, Cops: Shelley Long, Knocked Out, The Leash: Shelley Long, The Last Straw, Parenting, Dead Dad
| 30 | 10 | "Episode 10" | December 11, 1990 |
Sketches: Guess Your Weight, Go For Guilt, Hustlers: Math Teachers, Fag Basher, Friendly Rivals, Show Within A Show, Mr. Hugula, Housework Hustlers, Chocolate, Kevin Eats While Showering.
| 31 | 11 | "Episode 11" | December 18, 1990 |
Sketches: Fact #2, That's America, Prisoner's Jam, Fact #3, Cuttin' It Close 1, Secret of Broadway, Cuttin' It Close 2, Hustlers: Richard Nixon, Mispronouncer, Fact #3A, Dead Fish, A Walk with the Queen
| 32 | 12 | "Episode 12" | March 5, 1991 |
Sketches: Cops: Bubble Bath, How I Sleep, Old Friends, Standing, Vegas, Carpenter, Cops: Daughter, Encounter
| 33 | 13 | "Episode 13" | March 12, 1991 |
Sketches: Cops: Good Cop Bad Cop, Brad & The Phone, Fact: Uncle Tony, Book Bottle Blonde, Cops: Money, Shoes, Evil T, Fact: Bigfoot, Heckler, Fact: 45 Years of Love, The Long Note
| 34 | 14 | "Episode 14" | March 19, 1991 |
Sketches: Report, Gandar 1, M. Piedlourde Court un Marathon, Jazz Music, Gandar 2, Touch Bellini #1, The Affair, M. Piedlourde Essait L'Auto, Queen to Queen
| 35 | 15 | "Episode 15" | March 26, 1991 |
Sketches: M. Piedlourde Donne Un Coup De Pied Au Ballon, Scott's Not Gay, First Time, Bad News, Poo Guy, M. Piedlourde A Une Rendez-Vous, Victim, Night of the Cow, M. Piedlourde Sur La Lune
| 36 | 16 | "Episode 16" | April 2, 1991 |
Sketches: One of These Five Men, Cincinnati Kid, Career Ending 2, 30 Second Stories: Joe, No Words, 30 Second Stories: Dump, Career Ending 1, The Trip, Wild Weekend
| 37 | 17 | "Episode 17" | April 9, 1991 |
Sketches: Thousand Dollars, Cops: Towing, Decorator 1, Headcrusher: Rival, Shortest, Bellini Finale, Cops: Graveyard, Governor, Ham of Truth, Decorator 2
| 38 | 18 | "Episode 18" | April 16, 1991 |
Sketches: Clandestine Meeting 1, The Letter, Plungers, Clandestine Meeting 2, Fact: Aliens Are Super Intelligent, Mr. Pin, Liza's Party, Clandestine Meeting 3
| 39 | 19 | "Episode 19" | April 23, 1991 |
Sketches: The Cure, Secretaries: Logey, 30 Second Stories: Tess, Directions, Excellent Guy: Big Brother, 30 Second Stories: Office Party, Taxpayer, 30 Second Stories: Fries, Into The Doors
| 40 | 20 | "Episode 20" | April 30, 1991 |
Sketches: Lively Party, Butcher Shop, Cops: Sexism, Who's To Blame, Cops: Clouds, Having Tea, Faux Pas, Cops: Partners, Messages, Tube Top Justice, Hazy Movie

=== Season 3 (1991–92) ===
| No. overall | No. in season | Title | Original release date |
|---|---|---|---|
| 41 | 1 | "Episode 1" | October 1, 1991 |
Sketches: Plane, Body Conscious, Cabbie: Bigot, Chicken Lady Show, Cabbies: Pris, Cops: Abuse, Small C, The Pen, Cops: Movie, Touch Me There
| 42 | 2 | "Episode 2" | October 9, 1991 |
Sketches: Clothes Make the Man, Can't Sleep, Tiggy, I Can Live With That, Excellent TV, Can't Sleep 2, Girl Drink Drunk
| 43 | 3 | "Episode 3" | October 16, 1991 |
Sketches: Asleep on the Job, Measure, Nervous Break(fast) Down, Raise 1, Gimmel 100, Raise 2, Tammy
| 44 | 4 | "Episode 4" | October 23, 1991 |
Sketches: Golf, Earring, Flying Pig 1, Queen's Address, Flying Pig 2, Academy Awards, Cops: Flying Pig, Chop Chop, Flying Pig 3
| 45 | 5 | "Episode 5" | October 30, 1991 |
Sketches: Presentation, Tanya's Goodbye, Open Letter 1, Tucker, Open Letter 2, Until Proven Guilty, Underage
| 46 | 6 | "Episode 6" | November 5, 1991 |
Sketches: Cops: Night 1, Accents, Original Bat, Bingo, Drag Revolution, Cops: Night 2, Teamwork, Cops: Night 3
| 47 | 7 | "Episode 7" | November 12, 1991 |
Sketches: Mom or Dad, Evol, Same As Bruce, Mocking, Sacking All Admirals, Waiting Room, Kidnapped
| 48 | 8 | "Episode 8" | November 19, 1991 |
Sketches: Genius, Gut, Wedding Virgin, Terrier, Wedding Toast, Freedom of Speech, Wedding Objection, Excellent Patio
| 49 | 9 | "Episode 9" | December 3, 1991 |
Sketches: Cops: Old Lady, The Gift, Babysitter, M. Piedlourde Met ses Pantalons, Paris, Street Singers, M. Piedlourde: Deteste Le Film, Macaroni
| 50 | 10 | "Episode 10" | December 10, 1991 |
Sketches: Fact: Stone, After the Film, Replaced 1, Grandpa Geralds, Wages, Replaced 2, Haggle, Fact: Uncle, Captain Calm, Fact: Strike, Replaced 3
| 51 | 11 | "Episode 11" | December 17, 1991 |
Sketches: Girls, Mr. Right, He's Hip 1, Extreme, He's Hip 2, Harassment, He's Hip 3, Stay Down
| 52 | 12 | "Episode 12" | March 3, 1992 |
Sketches: Cops: Opera, Back on the Horse, Ed, Cops: Shift, Buddy's Date, Tea Factory, Cops: Asleep, Pickle
| 53 | 13 | "Episode 13" | March 10, 1992 |
Sketches: Boxing, Pizzeria, On the Subject of Me: Cow, Bartending School, On the Subject of Me: Caricature, The Sudelmans, On the Subject of Me: Moustache, My Horrible Secret
| 54 | 14 | "Episode 14" | March 17, 1992 |
Sketches: Poem: 99 Bottles, Funeral Home, Poem: The Fall, The King, Advice, Scar, Poem: The Empress, Emergency Troupe Meeting
| 55 | 15 | "Episode 15" | March 24, 1992 |
Sketches: Cops: Potato, Serial, Gross 1, Cops: Thinking, Home Alone, Opened Up, Gross 2, Shirlers
| 56 | 16 | "Episode 16" | March 31, 1992 |
Sketches: Resemble, Treatment, Fact: Ears, Night Train, Garbage Man, Fact: Vanilla Ice, Bauer
| 57 | 17 | "Episode 17" | April 7, 1992 |
Sketches: Father Figure 1, God, Darcy & Francesca, Father Figure 2, Letters from a Sick Bed, Joint, Father Figure 3, Joint Tag
| 58 | 18 | "Episode 18" | April 14, 1992 |
Sketches: Old Yeller 1, Skeletons, Ugly Situation, Vicky, Old Yeller 2, Armada, Horsey
| 59 | 19 | "Episode 19" | April 21, 1992 |
Sketches: What, Cattle Call, Clock Radio, Excellent Mom Frame, Cattle Call 2, Long Story, Celebration
| 60 | 20 | "Episode 20" | April 28, 1992 |
Sketches: On the Subject of Me: Spleen, Chicken Wedding, Whatever, Regrets, Check-Up, On the Subject of Me: Caesarian, Spy Models

=== Season 4 (1993–94) ===
| No. overall | No. in season | Title | Original release date |
|---|---|---|---|
| 61 | 1 | "Episode 1" | October 6, 1993 |
Sketches: Cameraman Memorial, Connecting With My Dog, Taxi Birth, Hookers: Undercover, Repair, Hair Styles, Rude Awakening, Hookers: Tourist, Would You Do An Alien?, Work Pig
| 62 | 2 | "Episode 2" | October 13, 1993 |
Sketches: Showdown: Phone Call (Parents), Age, Showdown: Good Looking, Darill Dream, Showdown: Creature, Virtual Sex, Deer By The Water, The Escape Artist
| 63 | 3 | "Episode 3" | October 20, 1993 |
Sketches: Fiore!, Hookers: Holdin' Out, Fantasy, Plastic Surgeon, Hookers: Ventolin, Can You Dig It?, The Big House, The Pains, Hookers: John Wayne
| 64 | 4 | "Episode 4" | October 27, 1993 |
Sketches: The Pardoning, No Contest, Showdown: Fish, Hookers: Phone Sex, Evil Patients, Showdown: Bruce and Dave, Cheating, The Sandwich People, Mr. Wrong, Mrs. Ondaatje
| 65 | 5 | "Episode 5" | November 3, 1993 |
Sketches: Newscasters, The Fun Never Stops, Perks, Neckbone, So Says You, Sex Girl Patrol
| 66 | 6 | "Episode 6" | November 10, 1993 |
Sketches: Deer By the Water: Radio, Cathy, Apartment Games 1, Knife Sharpener, Food, Apartment Games 2, Forceful Friends, Maria, Apartment Games 3
| 67 | 7 | "Episode 7" | December 16, 1993 |
Sketches: The Beatles, Chicken Lady Homecoming, He's Hip: Hiring 1, Patient/Doctor, Things to Do, He's Hip: Hiring 2, He's Hip: Hiring 3, Judy Fran & Gaugin
| 68 | 8 | "Episode 8" | December 23, 1993 |
Sketches: Hookers: Rich Guy, Gavin: Religion, Try It Now!, Just Terrific, Hookers: Puppet, Coincidence, Listening In, Hookers: New Coke, Thanksgiving
| 69 | 9 | "Episode 9" | December 30, 1993 |
Sketches: Chalet 2000: A Hilarious Episode-Long Sketch Starring Buddy and the Queen of the United Kingdom
| 70 | 10 | "Episode 10" | February 2, 1994 |
Sketches: Receptionist, Walk a Mile In My Shoes, Cops: Rookie Trick Question, A Soulfulness They Never Had, Cops: Rookie Coffee, Answering Machine, Celebrity, Cops: Rookie Puke, Divorce Court
| 71 | 11 | "Episode 11" | February 9, 1994 |
Sketches: Alan Bouvier, Career Crisis, Nice Day For Work, Hookers: Plastic Surgery, Armada: Understudy, Hookers: Commitment, Lost and Found, Clothesline, Hookers: Too Easy, Comfortable High
| 72 | 12 | "Episode 12" | February 16, 1994 |
Sketches: Luck, Fine Line, Tuck It In, Losing My Religion, Serpico, The Hangover, Wild Man
| 73 | 13 | "Episode 13" | February 23, 1994 |
Sketches: Cops: Fridge, Third Time Lucky, Cops: Spring, Exposed, Hookers: Documentaries, Nudity, Cops: Europe, Business World, Katnapped
| 74 | 14 | "Episode 14" | March 2, 1994 |
Sketches: Cannibal, Children, Bellini Contest, Wrong Number, Tammy: Roses, Borrowed Art
| 75 | 15 | "Episode 15" | April 1, 1994 |
Sketches: New Guy, Dad and Son Phone Call, Cops: Puck, Clear the Air, Seat 12B, Cops: Hair, Roller Bladers, Love and Sausages
| 76 | 16 | "Episode 16" | April 20, 1994 |
Sketches: Guilt, The Kathi's: Monday Meeting, The Voices, Steps: Hot, Becoming A Man, Steps: Drag, The Collector, Steps: Issues
| 77 | 17 | "Episode 17" | April 27, 1994 |
Sketches: Pops, Poker Face, Cheers, Cops: Worms, The Nap, Cops: Hungover, Contest, Just One Bite
| 78 | 18 | "Episode 18" | May 4, 1994 |
Sketches: Hookers: Transvestite, Excellent Composer, Hookers: Movie Star, Quarter Life Crisis, Cemetery, Drunk As a Crow, Advantage
| 79 | 19 | "Episode 19" | May 11, 1994 |
Sketches: People: Bike Courier, Ricardo, Chargin' Ya, Atrium, People: Winnipeg Chick, Art Studio, People: Hopeless Romantic, Surrogate
| 80 | 20 | "Episode 20" | May 18, 1994 |
Sketches: Cabbie, Seminar: "Gezbo", Diploma, Cabbie Two, On Board, Scary Sandwich, Extreme Argument

=== Season 5 (1994–95) ===
| No. overall | No. in season | Title | Original release date |
|---|---|---|---|
| 81 | 1 | "Episode 1" | October 5, 1994 |
Sketches: Idiot Boy: Assistant, Cops: Interrogation 1, Feelyat, Cops: Interrogation 2, Catching Up, Martyr, Cops: Interrogation 4, The Beard
| 82 | 2 | "Episode 2" | October 12, 1994 |
Sketches: Cops: Interrogation 5, Please Please Please, Special Sauce, Chance Meeting, Cops: Interrogation 7, Document, Grizzly, Cops: Interrogation Finale
| 83 | 3 | "Episode 3" | October 19, 1994 |
Sketches: Hookers: Drum Up Business, How To, Just One Guy, Hookers: Rap Music, Por-eef, Jug Head, The Hit
| 84 | 4 | "Episode 4" | October 26, 1994 |
Sketches: God is Dead, New Boots, Hookers: Porno, Rockey, Hookers: Price List, Montreal 2, Hookers: Clock, Dessert
| 85 | 5 | "Episode 5" | December 7, 1994 |
Sketches: Steps: Lesbian & Gay Pride, Waiter With Stumps For Hands, Squealin', Gavin: Leaking, Steps: Protest, Good to Cry 2, Steps: Drag Queens & Leather People, Sounds
| 86 | 6 | "Episode 6" | December 14, 1994 |
Sketches: Cruisin' For a Bruisin' 1, Teen Reporters, Mad With Power, Sick About Crime, Business Opportunity, Cruisin' For a Bruisin' 2, New Poets New Philosophers, Cruisin' For a Bruisin' 3, Each Day We Work
| 87 | 7 | "Episode 7" | December 21, 1994 |
Sketches: Slo-Mo, Relocation, Hookers: Heart, Lookin' For Love, Take A Letter, Hookers: Date, Duck Blind, Hookers: Skanky, Big In France
| 88 | 8 | "Episode 8" | December 28, 1994 |
Sketches: Call Me 1, Hobby Horse, Old People, Got Ya, Call Me 2, Step Class, Call Me 3, Needed Elsewhere
| 89 | 9 | "Episode 9" | January 18, 1995 |
Sketches: Steps: Parents, Loud American Shopping, Loves Ya, The DT's, Great Ideas, At the Movies
| 90 | 10 | "Episode 10" | January 25, 1995 |
Sketches: Small Town Pride, Last Call, Lovers 3, The Bank, Elk, The Trick, Lovers 4, My Training
| 91 | 11 | "Episode 11" | February 1, 1995 |
Sketches: Test Tube Baby, Dry Cleaners, Hookers: Kid, Dignity, Let Sleeping Dogs Lie, Hookers: Mom, Problem With Relationships
| 92 | 12 | "Episode 12" | February 8, 1995 |
Sketches: Good Connection, Extreme Roommates, Armada: Check 1, Shoe Shine, The Monkeys, Under Dog, Armada: Camera Man, Danny Husk: Husk Musk
| 93 | 13 | "Episode 13" | February 15, 1995 |
Sketches: Poor Richard, Bartending Wedding, Hookers: Hopeful, Darn Near Puked, Hookers: Boyfriend, Activist: Die, Armada: Mute, Dance
| 94 | 14 | "Episode 14" | February 22, 1995 |
Sketches: Cops: Looting, It's Nothing, The Bikini Inspector, Cops: Guns Fired, Yes Minister, Written in Haste, High-Tech Car Alarm
| 95 | 15 | "Episode 15" | March 1, 1995 |
Sketches: Uncouth, Play Back, Penny, Brucio, All's Fair in Love, Fran: Identity
| 96 | 16 | "Episode 16" | March 8, 1995 |
Sketches: Secret Pleasure, Errands, Gazebo, What If?, Experiment
| 97 | 17 | "Episode 17" | March 15, 1995 |
Sketches: Creative Possibilities, Butch's Phone Sex Party, Weekend With Daddy, Living Proof, Big Bucks
| 98 | 18 | "Episode 18" | March 22, 1995 |
Sketches: Cops: Why, Personal, Exercise, Steps: Cause of AIDs, Bye Stan, Bellini Day
| 99 | 19 | "Episode 19" | March 29, 1995 |
Sketches: Francesca Syntax, Sperm Bank 1, Unannounced, Sperm Bank 2, Impulsive, Sperm Bank 3, Operation, Sperm Bank 4
| 100 | 20 | "Episode 20" | April 8, 1995 |
Sketches: Armada: Check 2, Crowd Control, Encyclopedia, Junk Mail, Armada: Nice Face, Liquidation, Sam and Janet, Stair Climber
| 101 | 21 | "Episode 21" | April 15, 1995 |
Sketches: Bellini Opening, Armada: But Does Armada Make It?, Tribute to Berman, Empty Bar, Things We Couldn't Show, AT and Death, Bellini Speaks

=== Season 6 (2022) ===
| No. overall | No. in season | Title | Directed by | Written by | Original release date |
|---|---|---|---|---|---|
| 102 | 1 | Episode 1 | Kelly Makin & Aleysa Young | Garry Campbell & Dave Foley & Bruce McCulloch & Kevin McDonald & Mark McKinney & Scott Thompson & Jennifer Goodhue & Matt Watts | May 13, 2022 |
| 103 | 2 | Episode 2 | Aleysa Young & Kelly Makin | Garry Campbell & Dave Foley & Bruce McCulloch & Kevin McDonald & Mark McKinney & Scott Thompson & Jennifer Goodhue | May 13, 2022 |
| 104 | 3 | Episode 3 | Kelly Makin & Aleysa Young | Garry Campbell & Dave Foley & Bruce McCulloch & Kevin McDonald & Mark McKinney & Scott Thompson & Jennifer Goodhue & Matt Watts | May 13, 2022 |
| 105 | 4 | Episode 4 | Aleysa Young & Kelly Makin | Garry Campbell & Dave Foley & Bruce McCulloch & Kevin McDonald & Mark McKinney & Scott Thompson & Jennifer Goodhue & Matt Watts | May 13, 2022 |
| 106 | 5 | Episode 5 | Aleysa Young & Kelly Makin | Garry Campbell & Dave Foley & Bruce McCulloch & Kevin McDonald & Mark McKinney & Scott Thompson & Jennifer Goodhue & Matt Watts & Julie Klausner | May 13, 2022 |
| 107 | 6 | Episode 6 | Kelly Makin & Aleysa Young | Garry Campbell & Dave Foley & Bruce McCulloch & Kevin McDonald & Mark McKinney & Scott Thompson & Jennifer Goodhue & Matt Watts | May 13, 2022 |
| 108 | 7 | Episode 7 | Aleysa Young & Kelly Makin | Garry Campbell & Dave Foley & Bruce McCulloch & Kevin McDonald & Mark McKinney & Scott Thompson & Jennifer Goodhue & Matt Watts | May 13, 2022 |
| 109 | 8 | Episode 8 | Kelly Makin & Aleysa Young | Garry Campbell & Dave Foley & Bruce McCulloch & Kevin McDonald & Mark McKinney & Scott Thompson & Jennifer Goodhue & Matt Watts | May 13, 2022 |
