= Super 8½ =

Super 8 1/2
- Directed by: Bruce LaBruce
- Written by: Bruce LaBruce
- Starring: Bruce LaBruce; Stacy Friedrich; Mikey Mike; Nicholas Davies; Christeen Martin
- Release date: 1994
- Running time: 100 minutes
- Countries: Canada; Germany
- Language: English

Super 8 1/2 is a 1994 satirical drama film written and directed by Bruce LaBruce. The film is about a failing pornographic film director who enters into a partnership with a lesbian filmmaker. It becomes clear that she has her own agenda and is exploiting him to help her succeed in her own project.

The film premiered at the 1994 Toronto International Film Festival and was shown in the midnight series at the 1994 Sundance Film Festival. It received a DCP digital restoration by the IFC Center that screened on October 4, 2026 and is to be distributed by Strand Releasing.

== Cast ==
- Bruce LaBruce as Bruce and Butt Double
- Stacy Friedrich (credited as Liza LaMonica, Dirty Pillows and as Stacy Friedrich) as Googie and Jane Friday
- Mikey Mike as Johnny Eczema
- Nicholas Davies (credited as Klaus von Brücker) as Pierce
- Christeen Martin (credited as Chris Teen) as Wednesday Friday
- Kate Ashley (credited as Amy Nitrate) as Honey Velour
- Scott Thompson as Buddy Cole

Other cast members;

- Davey Danger as Production Assistant
- Vaginal Davis as herself
- Gemma Files as Lady at Press Conference
- Mike Gibb as Male victim with guitar
- Rosemary Heather as Lady at Press Conference
- Hal Kelly as Lady at Press Conference
- Richard Kern as himself
- Ben Weasel as himself
