= The Kids in the Hall (TV series) =

Canadian sketch comedy show

- Starring: Dave Foley; Bruce McCulloch; Kevin McDonald; Mark McKinney; Scott Thompson
- Opening theme: "Having an Average Weekend", performed by Shadowy Men on a Shadowy Planet
- Composer: Shadowy Men on a Shadowy Planet
- Country of origin: Canada
- Original language: English
- No. of seasons: 6
- No. of episodes: 109 (list of episodes)

Production
- Producers: Lorne Michaels; Joe Bodolai
- Running time: 25 minutes
- Production companies: Broadway Video; Project 10 Productions (2022); Amazon Studios (2022)

Original release
- Network: CBC Television
- Release: October 16, 1988 – April 15, 1995
- Network: Amazon Prime Video
- Release: May 13, 2022

Related
- Death Comes to Town

The Kids in the Hall is a Canadian sketch comedy television series that aired for five seasons from 1988 to 1995, and a sixth revival season in 2022, starring the comedy troupe The Kids in the Hall. The troupe, consisting of comedians Dave Foley, Kevin McDonald, Mark McKinney, Bruce McCulloch, and Scott Thompson, appeared as almost all the characters throughout the series, both male and female, and wrote most of the sketches.

The series debuted as a one-hour pilot special which aired on HBO and CBC Television in 1988 and began airing as a regular weekly series on both services in 1989. The regular series premiered July 21, 1989, on HBO, and September 14 on CBC. In the United States, the first three seasons were on HBO before it moved to CBS in 1993, where it stayed for two more seasons airing late Friday nights. CBC aired the show for the whole duration of its run. A sixth, revival season of the show, which includes eight episodes, was released on Amazon Prime Video on May 13, 2022. It features the entire troupe as well as numerous guest stars, and was Amazon's first Canadian original series.

The theme song for the show is the instrumental "Having an Average Weekend" by the Canadian band Shadowy Men on a Shadowy Planet.

== Synopsis ==
Despite their SNL connection, the show's sketches were more reminiscent of Monty Python's Flying Circus: often quirky or surreal, frequently utilizing drag, with very few celebrity impressions or pop culture parodies; the only recurring celebrity impression was of Queen Elizabeth II, played by Scott Thompson. A recurring character was Mr. Tyzik, played by McKinney, who pretended to crush people's heads from a distance with his fingers. McKinney also played Chicken Lady, a shrill-voiced sexually excitable human-chicken hybrid. Another prominent recurring character was Cabbage Head, played by McCulloch, who was a gruff-voiced cigar-smoking misogynist who frequently used the fact that he had cabbage in place of hair as a means to generate pity in the hopes of getting women into bed. Many of the sketches featured gay characters and themes; most of these sketches were written by and starred Thompson, who is gay himself.

The Kids frequently appeared as themselves rather than as characters, and some sketches dealt directly with the fact that they were a comedy troupe producing a TV show. For example, Kevin McDonald announces that if the next sketch (which he has written) is not successful, the others are considering kicking him out of the group. In another episode, Thompson declares that he is not gay anymore, which throws the other Kids into a panic, as they fear that the news will alienate the troupe's considerable gay fanbase. In yet another sketch (in which an employee, Foley, asks his boss, McDonald, for a raise) McDonald complains the setup is cliché and his character one-dimensional.

Monologues were a staple of the show. Thompson's Buddy Cole monologues are the best known, but the other Kids performed solo pieces as well. McCulloch in particular performed monologues that consisted of him, acting as himself, telling hyperbolic stories of the struggles and day-to-day experiences in his life and/or the lives of others. Prominent examples from the other Kids include Foley describing his positive attitude toward menstruation, McKinney in character as a high-pitched recluse who is describing with intense fascination his hideously infected and bruised toe, and in a gag reminiscent of Bob Newhart, a distraught McDonald calling a best friend's young son to tell him his father died, only to have the child end up consoling him, even going so far as quoting famous philosophers on the ultimate emptiness of life.

The show originated in Canada, and the content was at times edited slightly for U.S. broadcast tastes. Sketches mocking religion were sometimes cut down or removed, necessitating the addition of material from other episodes to round out the half-hour. Some US channels censored the occasional nudity as well, such as when Foley revealed to Thompson he had inexplicably grown breasts. Among the more controversial sketches was the final sketch of Season 1, "Dr. Seuss Bible", in which the troupe tells the story of Jesus Christ's crucifixion in the style of children's author Dr. Seuss.

Though the show occasionally featured guest actors (notably Neve Campbell and Nicole de Boer well before they became famous), the Kids played nearly all parts, both male and female, themselves. The only known special guests to have appeared on the show were comedian Rip Taylor and musician Chris Robinson in cameo roles. In contrast to Monty Python, where the members often donned drag to portray older women but usually utilized women such as Carol Cleveland and Connie Booth to play young and attractive female characters, all the Kids regularly played both old and young women; the frequent cross-dressing became one of the show's trademarks. Female impersonation had begun during their stage show, because they found themselves writing female characters but had no female member to play them. As Thompson explained, "The way we played women ... we weren't winking at the audience ... We were never, like, going, 'Oh, look at me! I'm a guy in a dress!' Never. We would always try to be real, and that, I think, freaked people out..."

The CBC aired the show through its entire run. Seasons 1–3 aired on HBO. In the fall of 1992, CBS picked up the show and aired it on late-night Fridays showing repeats, while HBO aired new episodes of season three. In 1993, CBS aired new episodes starting with season four. The final season aired on Fridays after Late Show with David Letterman. The series finale aired in November 1994. In January 1995, it was replaced with The Late Late Show.

In addition to the troupe's core members, other writers for the series included Diane Flacks, Norm Hiscock, Andy Jones, Garry Campbell, Paul Bellini and Brian Hartt.

== Episodes ==
Season	Episodes	Originally released		
Season	Episodes	First released	Last released	Network
Pilot		October 16, 1988		CBC Television
1	20	October 24, 1989	May 15, 1990	CBC Television
2	20	September 25, 1990	April 30, 1991	CBC Television
3	20	October 1, 1991	April 28, 1992	CBC Television
4	20	October 6, 1993	May 18, 1994	CBC Television
5	21	October 5, 1994	April 15, 1995	CBC Television
6	8	May 13, 2022		Amazon Prime Video

Between 1988 and 1995 there were 102 episodes of The Kids in the Hall produced, plus 9 compilation episodes. Some episodes had two versions, an American version and a Canadian version, often with alternate sketches. In 1996, the group followed the series with a feature film, Brain Candy, and in 2010 they reunited to produce an eight episode narrative miniseries, Death Comes to Town.

== Show contents ==
=== Recurring sketches and characters ===
30 Helens Agree
Thirty women (all named Helen) stand in a field and declare their agreement on a platitude or statement; for example, "Thirty Helens agree: If you have a good idea, you should write it down." One time they disagreed, but later agreed to disagree. At one point, only 29 Helens agreed that promptness was important (the thirtieth Helen was running late). The Helens appeared frequently throughout the first season, but did not appear in any subsequent seasons. According to Bruce McCulloch (in the Oral History segment of the Season 1 DVD set), 30 Helens Agree was his idea.

The Axe Murderer
An axe murderer (Foley) approaches people for favours after he has obviously committed a brutal and grisly homicide with the axe he is carrying. Covered in blood, he makes polite small talk with people he runs into, casually admitting he is, in fact, an axe murderer. Before leaving, he amiably asks whoever he talks not to tell anyone or "Chop chop!", accompanied by a chopping motion with his axe.

Bauer
Bauer (Thompson) is a young stoner (presumably in his late teens or early twenties) who, as a result of his frequent pot use, is very well-spoken and insightful. In one popular sketch, he reveals to his friend Kyle (McDonald) that he has been having an affair with Kyle's married mother (Foley), which of course is very unsettling to Kyle. Bauer waxes poetic about the mother's beauty, then stands up, announcing he has "got a chub-on". Bauer first appeared on the show as the best friend of Bobby Terrance (see below), but later became a recurring character in his own right.

Bellini
Portrayed by series writer Paul Bellini, the character Bellini appeared on the show wearing nothing but a towel and never spoke. The character was created when the CBC asked The Kids in the Hall to hold a fan sweepstakes, and the troupe decided the winning prize would be the chance to "touch Bellini". The character was again offered as the top prize in a fourth season contest where the winner would get to have breakfast with Bellini at their local airport.

At the end of the final episode, after the five Kids have been buried alive, Bellini appears and speaks for the first time, saying "Thank God that's finally over!" as he dances on the grave.

Bellini returns for the Amazon revival to dig the Kids out of the grave.

Bobby Terrance
Bobby (McCulloch) is a rebellious teenager whose love of rock 'n' roll serves as the basis for most of his sketches. Bobby views rock as an expression of personal freedom, and always fights back when he feels like he is being denied that freedom. He is frequently in conflict with his parents, played by McKinney (father) and Foley (mother). He has also taken on a sarcastic jazz-loving teacher (Foley), and once even faced off against the Devil himself (McKinney) in a guitar-playing contest. Despite his rebellious attitude toward authority, he emphatically enjoys the taste of his mother's ham steak. A pre-Star Trek Nicole de Boer appeared in three sketches as Bobby's girlfriend Laura. He, like Bauer above, are a tongue-in-cheek satire of the rebellious late-1980s/1990s Grunge/Generation X subculture.

Buddy Cole

Buddy Cole is an effeminate, gay socialite, with a penchant for going on long, comedic rants about his personal life and the gay community. He also frequently drops celebrity names, insinuating that he has many close friendships with the rich and famous. He is penpals with Elizabeth II. His monologues are often delivered from the gay bar he owns, which is called Buddy's. In the original series finale, he set fire to the bar and burned it down; in the Amazon revival season, he reveals that not only did his bar burn down, but every subsequent business built on the spot did as well.

Cabbage Head
Cabbage Head (McCulloch) was born with cabbage leaves in place of hair. He also always smokes cigars and wears a red smoking jacket à la Hugh Hefner. He is extremely crude and sexist, and spends most of his time trying to pick up women for sex, using his cabbage head in an attempt to garner sympathy and, hopefully, sex ("Hey, I'm the king of the mercy fuck!" he declares in his first appearance). In one episode, he is shot in the head at a bar by a feminist crusader (also played by McCulloch) and, in a near-death experience, sees God, who said he created Cabbage Head in his image, at which point God is revealed to have a cabbage for a head himself. Later we see Cabbage Head on a Christian talk show talking about his miraculous survival, although he continues to hold sexist viewpoints, as evidenced by his promotion of a "sacred wet T-shirt contest—er, I mean, baptism" he was conducting. Whenever anyone objects to his odd behavior, he always insists he is being persecuted for his cabbage head. "Why won't you let me forget that I have a cabbage for a head!?"

Cathy and Kathie
Kathie (McCulloch) and Cathy (Thompson) are secretaries at the firm of A.T. & Love (KITH's catch-all business, and a play on AT&T). These sketches parodied the banality of office life, from guessing the sexuality of the new guy to dealing with an ex-stripper temp named Tanya (McKinney). A few sketches also included McDonald as another coworker named Ann, and Foley in a dual role as their supervisor Elizabeth and Cathy's roommate Patty. In the middle of the third season, Tanya finished her term of employment and left the office amidst feigned tearfulness from her coworkers; however, she reappeared in the fifth season, once again working at the firm as a temp. The final sketch of the series was about Cathy and Kathie, as they prepared to leave their jobs after A.T. & Love was sold.

Kathie appeared independently of Cathy in the first season, where it was revealed that she once dated Mississippi Gary (see below). A picture of him was on her cubicle wall in all subsequent appearances.

Cathy and Kathie return to the company in the Amazon revival, where they learn that faxes will no longer be sent.

The Chicken Lady

The Bearded Lady with the Chicken Lady.

The Chicken Lady (McKinney) is a middle-aged, apartment-dwelling, physically strong, sex-obsessed freak: the result of mating between a male drifter and a hen. Her desire for men often led to violent orgasms complete with an explosion of feathers. She was first presented in the tail end of a sketch, in which Foley and McCulloch portray two kids who come to a circus freak show. Finding one of the freaks - (McDonald) "The man who can make his nose bleed at will" - on his lunchbreak, they try to badger him to do an impromptu show for them. Annoyed, the freak screams at them to "go see the Chicken Lady" because "she's an emotional dependent!" They finish the sketch by kicking hay at the Chicken Lady who is trying to lay eggs, eager to entertain anyone.

The first fully featured sketch featuring the Chicken Lady centered on her blind date with an unsuspecting young man (Foley) who comes to meet her at her apartment. Although clearly repulsed by her appearance and mannerisms, he is initially compelled to stay. However he finally flees in horror when she feeds him an omelet made from an egg she herself laid. Later sketches included a visit by Chicken Lady to her childhood home, Chicken Lady working for a phone sex line, and a visit to a male stripper revue, where she is captivated by a performer nicknamed "Rooster Boy". Her final appearance is at a mall where she insists on riding a coin-operated horse and repeatedly asks a mother to remove her child so that she can use the horse to masturbate like she does everyday. This disgusts the mother who finally leaves with her child. A notable friend of the Chicken Lady's was an Irish bearded lady who seemed to always be consuming alcohol and smoking a cigar. She was played by McDonald and appeared in many sketches alongside the Chicken Lady. After The Kids in the Hall ended in 1994, McKinney joined the cast of Saturday Night Live. In 1995, McKinney played the Chicken Lady in a one-time sketch called The Chicken Lady Show, and the character was not seen again until the Kids' 2010 miniseries Death Comes to Town in a small cameo. In DVD commentary for The Kids in the Hall's third season, McKinney states that both Chicken Lady and the Bearded Lady were inspired by Tod Browning's movie Freaks.

Danny Husk
A businessman, played by Thompson, who was featured in a number of sketches. He is an executive at A.T. & Love, a company that also makes many appearances in unrelated sketches. In one sketch, his armpit odor becomes a best-selling, world-changing product. In another, he wakes up one morning and reads the newspaper, which states he has been kidnapped, after which he desperately gathers money to pay his own ransom. In yet another, Danny is summoned to the office of his boss, who needs to be consoled upon discovering "brown stuff" oozing from his mouth. Husk is successful in his consolation when he tells his boss that there is "no need to see a doctor" since the substance is odorless, and therefore, not "poo-based". Another appearance has Danny's boss discover that he used to be a porn star by the name of Blade Rogers. In many of his appearances, Husk serves as a straight man to the wacky antics of one of the others. Foley had a recurring role as Husk's rotund boss. Danny Husk ended up appearing in approximately a dozen sketches through seasons 1, 3, 4 and 5. Additionally, a variation of Husk, named Wally Terzinsky, appeared in the Kids' 1996 movie Brain Candy.

Darcy Pennell
A parody of Canadian morning talk show host Dini Petty played by McDonald. Her guests include a French-speaking fashion designer named Christian Renoir and recurring character Francesca Fiore (Thompson). Darcy has trouble pronouncing the names of her guests, such as saying "Christ-aan Ren-aah" when announcing her guest Christian Renoir. The audience is also practically empty. The theme song to the talk show goes "Darcy, Darcy, Darcy Pennell, she makes your life a lot less hell. Darcy!"

Darill
A man (McKinney) named Darill (pronounced da-RILL), who never quite understands what is going on, but always tries to affect an air of sophistication. Darill's strange mix of sunny good will, idiocy and pretense annoys everyone he meets, although he is rarely aware of it. Famous Darill sketches involve him hosting a painting show on television, joining the Big Brother program and mentoring an unreceptive boy, and appearing as a contestant on a bizarre European game show called Feelyat!. The background for Darill's strange behavior is explained somewhat in one sketch, in which we see a flashback of Darill as a child in Belgium, and the strange rapport he enjoys with his mother (whom he still lives with, much to the confusion of the date he has brought back to his apartment). One sketch also reveals that the only thing he ever daydreams about is a tiny oom-pah band playing on a windowsill, and is astonished when he discovers others don't have that limitation. After the end of The Kids in the Hall television show, McKinney became a Saturday Night Live cast member, and brought Darill onto that show.

The Eradicator
McCulloch plays a squash obsessed executive, who, parodying masked wrestlers, walks around wearing a black ski mask, and never reveals his secret identity, calling himself "The Eradicator", which he often yells in a high-pitched voice while he plays his favorite game. In the Amazon revival, the Eradicator wakes from a twenty year coma and is disgusted by how non-competitive people have become.

The Flying Pig
The Flying Pig (McCulloch) entertains people at bank machines and other of life's many line-ups. When lines grow long and waiting becomes intolerable, he appears above the Toronto skyline and introduces himself by calling out "Oink Oink!" and exclaiming "Wow! What a line up! But don't worry about it. Look at me! Hey Hey Hey!" After a few moments he notices the line is thinning out and he flies away. He is unfortunately killed (and subsequently eaten) after flying into power lines and cooking himself. His job is later taken up by his son, the aptly named "Son of Flying Pig".

Francesca Fiore and Bruno Puntz Jones
Francesca Fiore (Thompson) and Bruno Puntz Jones (Foley) are a pair of fast-living, glamorous movie stars. Though they originally hail from South America, their films have a decidedly European flavor. Francesca is fiery and passionate, and tends to be overdramatic and expressive in her actions. Bruno (who always wears a white suit and a Panama hat) is very cool and reserved, but inwardly seems to share Francesca's spirit. Bruno occasionally likes to play Russian Roulette alone, a practice he refers to dismissively as "my little game". He is also prone to shooting people with little or no warning, usually when he feels Francesca is being threatened. The two always play lovers in their films together; they seem to be romantically involved in real life as well, though the exact relationship between them is not made clear. In court, where Francesca was facing divorce (for a fake marriage to gain Canadian citizenship) from Mr. Tisane (another recurring character), Bruno revealed he and she were married when he was 12 and she was 26. According to the crew, Foley's character was originally named Bruno Puntz, but when the writers decided to change his last name to Jones, they wrote the word "Jones" in without deleting "Puntz", accidentally creating a compound name.

Gavin
Gavin (McCulloch) is a precocious boy whose chief personality trait is his tendency to ramble on incessantly about bizarre events that may or may not have actually occurred. Most Gavin sketches featured him confusing or annoying strangers with his usually implausible wonderings; he once observed that he could eat an entire Bible, but it would take him "several days of munching and snacking". One sketch, however, saw Gavin falling in love with his babysitter (McDonald) because she actually understood him. He has a tense relationship with his parents, particularly his deadbeat father (McDonald). Gavin's look is very distinctive; he wears large, oversized glasses and is almost always seen sporting a baseball cap (which usually has either the Toronto Blue Jays or The Legend of Zelda logo on it) and backpack.

Gordon and Fran
Gordon (McCulloch) and Fran (Thompson) are a middle-aged couple. Gordon is very crotchety, and is usually seen complaining in any sketch he appears in, and occasionally seems to enjoy tormenting his wife. His wife Fran is well-meaning and slightly batty, but has a tendency to nag. The most famous Gordon and Fran sketch is probably "Salty Ham", in which Gordon blames his trouble going to sleep on the salty ham Fran served at dinner. Their teenage son Brian (Foley) is sarcastic and rebellious, and is always eager to take advantage of his parents' generosity.

Headcrusher
Mr. Tyzik (McKinney) is a lonely man who despises virtually everyone, especially those he considers businessmen and trendy people. He calls them "flatheads" because in his mind, their heads deserve to be crushed. He is more than willing to help by pretending to crush their heads from a distance with his fingers, using forced perspective, while enthusiastically declaring "I'm crushing your head! I'm crushing your head!" in a high-pitched nasal voice with an Eastern European accent, followed by making a crushing noise. In his own words: "Not everyone deserves to have their head crushed, just 99.99999% of them." It is suggested that the headcrushing is not necessarily all in his head, in one sketch, where he is able to quickly determine that the heads of two people passing by have already been crushed by a "facepincher", with whom he proceeds to have a duel.

He's Hip, He's Cool, He's 45
McCulloch played a middle-aged man who would do odd things to "keep his cool" despite being middle-aged. In one sketch he interviews a man for a job, first asking if the man wants to smoke a joint.

It's a Fact!
A young red-haired girl, played by 12-year-old Jessica Shifman, would pop up in the forest and reveal a piece of information, usually illustrated by people appearing behind her. She ended by saying "It's a fact!" and then run off. One version of the sketch featured McKinney dressed as the girl saying that the actual It's a Fact girl wanted more money. The running was filmed in stop-animated "fast-motion". The sketch was based on an actual series of public service announcements for children's programming in Canada throughout the 1970's and 80's.

The King of Empty Promises
Dean (McDonald) constantly promises his friend Lex (Foley) items or favours to make up for his lack of follow-through on previous promises, his deadpan pledges punctuated with the phrase "Will do." Whenever he is confronted about a promise he did not keep, Dean's standard excuse for his behaviour is that it "slipped my mind".
On the DVD commentary, McDonald mentions that Dean is based on himself while the character's manner is based on series writer Paul Bellini. McDonald said he has been known to make promises that he would never follow through on, and even the Paul Simon album he mentions in the first "King" sketch was an actual promise he made to a friend that he never managed to fulfill.

Mississippi Gary
A seemingly octogenarian blues player played by McKinney in blackface. He first appeared in a sketch in which he talked about his failed relationship with "Kathy with a K" (McCulloch) from the Secretary sketches and soon grew into a recurring character. His name and style of speech suggest that he may be a parody of the blues guitarist Mississippi Fred McDowell, and an early sketch reveals that Gary is actually a white college graduate who imitates a bluesman due to an affection for the musical style. Gary always began a long, blues-related story with the words "Now, I seem to remember a time..." in a deep Mississippi accent before launching into a harmonica solo or blues song. His songs include "The 'There is a Very Effective Heckler in My Audience' Blues" (in a sketch where Foley, in the audience, points out that Gary actually has very little to complain about as he makes over $10,000 a night) and "Smokin' On the Night Train".

Mr. Heavyfoot (M. Piedlourde)
Foley as an apparently French man who for reasons that are never explained has extremely heavy feet. The Heavyfoot sketches, which were short and contained no dialogue, usually dealt with the extreme difficulty his condition presented for him in everyday situations, such as putting on pants and walking around or taking a year to complete a marathon. The style of these shorts is reminiscent of the Jacques Tati films.

Nobody Likes Us
Foley and McDonald played two depressed men with perpetual frowns on their faces who spoke in whiny voices and always complained that people didn't like them. They often engaged in bizarre behavior, including hanging themselves in front of a banker's house (after she rejected them for a loan), eating earthworms on a bus trip (after a chorus of the "Nobody Likes Me (Guess I'll Go Eat Worms!)" children's song), and McDonald coughing up his own liver (and eating it) as a magic trick on a date.
Foley and McDonald have mentioned that they originally wrote the sketch on an airplane when their flight attendant was purposely ignoring them. Foley then turned to McDonald with a pouty face and said "Nobody likes us."

The Pit of Ultimate Darkness (Simon and Hecubus)
A horror-themed TV show which tries to be scary but fails, hosted by Crowleyesque Sir Simon Milligan (McDonald), "a man possessed by many demons—polite demons that would open a door for a lady carrying too many parcels—but demons, nonetheless!" His level of "wickedness" is such that his behavior and magic acts basically consist of doing something mildly annoying or rude—such as spoiling the endings of movies—then loudly declaring it "Evil!" Foley co-starred as Simon's manservant Hecubus (made up to resemble the character of Cesare from The Cabinet of Dr. Caligari), whose sense of child-like mischief provided much of the sketches' humor. While superficially he appears to be Milligan's fawning lackey, even addressing Milligan as "Master", he actually delights in annoying Milligan at every opportunity, and is at least slightly more talented at being evil. At such times, Milligan points at him and yells "Evil!"
The other members of the cast often ribbed McDonald and ask why he had not named his character in the Hecubus scene—knowing full well that the character was named Simon—because fans typically only remembered Foley's part of the sketch. According to the DVD commentary, McDonald was originally to play Hecubus, with McKinney as Simon; but McDonald lobbied for the role of Simon and, after winning it, insisted that Foley should play Hecubus.

Police Department
Brief vignettes featuring McKinney and McCulloch as a pair of Toronto city police officers, usually standing beside their squad car, making banal small-talk while rarely doing actual police work. One such sketch featured McKinney describing a homicide and police chase in technical detail, but it is revealed that he is describing a movie he saw (rather than an actual homicide), and has no idea what the story is with the actual dead body the two cops are standing over. The characters originated in the full-length sketch "On the Run", in which the two cops try to pursue a group of escaped convicts without looking conspicuous. According to the DVD commentary, McKinney and McCulloch, during a break in shooting that particular sketch, began to improvise several short scenes revolving around those two characters for fun; some of their improvisations were incorporated into the show, and proved so popular they became a fixture. The duo have the distinction of being the show's most frequently used recurring characters; they were also carried over into Kids in the Hall: Brain Candy and Death Comes to Town.

Prostitutes (Maudre and Jocelyn)
Maudre (Thompson) and Jocelyn (Foley) are prostitutes who solicit customers on the street. Maudre is blonde and brassy, but with a definite soft side. Jocelyn is a brunette from Quebec who speaks softly in a Canadian French accent. The two often pass the time by discussing aspects of their profession, such as whether they would accept an offer from an extraterrestrial. In another sketch, a policeman (McCulloch; see "Police Department" above) ineptly poses as a customer while his partner (McKinney), in uniform, stands a few feet away hoping to bust them. McDonald occasionally appeared as Rudy, their asthmatic pimp. The sketches were loosely inspired by the 1984 Canadian prostitution documentary Hookers on Davie, directed by Janis Cole and Holly Dale.

Rod Torfulson's Armada featuring Herman Menderchuk
A very bad garage band with no hope of ever becoming real rock stars, but they nevertheless take themselves very seriously and argue constantly about every aspect of their career, sound and look. The sketches starred McCulloch as Rod (the drummer), McKinney as Herman (the bass player), and McDonald as the lead guitarist. A recurring theme was Rod's and Herman's abusive treatment of McDonald's character, the only one with talent. (He is the only one whose name is not part of the group's name; in one sketch, he is forced to begin paying the others a salary in order to avoid being kicked out of the band.) "Trampoline Girl" is just one of their many non-hits. ("She's a tramp, she's tramp, she's a trampoline girl...") In their appearance in the final episode, a Rock and Roll Angel (portrayed by Black Crowes frontman Chris Robinson) appears from on high and shows them their wretched future ("You suck!"), but they still persist in believing that someday they will "make it".

Sizzler Sisters
Foley and McDonald play two clearly insane people (although they always introduced themselves as "not two clearly insane people"), who wear large wigs (with price tags still attached) and identified themselves as Jerry Sizzler and Jerry Sizzler, the Sizzler Sisters. They are usually seen doing insane things, such as posing as a cappella lounge singers, robbing a bank in order to make a deposit and then forcing people to mix up their shoes. In one sketch, Foley's character (whose real name is revealed to be Lister) has become sane through medication and is happily married. McDonald's character (whose real name is revealed to be Jean-Pierre) comes to Lister's apartment and urges him into become insane again, causing him stress and then withholding his medication. McDonald mentioned in an interview that he and Foley thought up the characters while running through the "Kathie and Cathy" beauty pageant sketch ("T.G.I.N.P.!"). Because they were bored, they started improvising that they were crazy people who escaped from an asylum; using the wigs (that they were wearing as background pageant contestants in the sketch) as their "disguises". They wrote the "Sizzler & Sizzler" sketch shortly thereafter.

Steps
Three young stereotypical gay men sit on the steps of a café discussing current events, particularly those concerning the gay community. Riley (Foley) is an effeminate airhead, "Butch" (Thompson) is an oversexed airhead who always talks about "hot" men, and Smitty (McDonald) is an intelligent fop who is usually exasperated by the other two.
The "Steps" sketches commemorated a long-time touchstone in Toronto's gay community: a small series of steps running the length of an office and retail building in the Church Wellesley Village. Throughout the 1980s and 1990s, the steps were a classic meeting place and hangout for gay Torontonians. However, in 2003, the steps were remodeled to remove their inviting long stretches. The local businesses at the top of them—including a Second Cup coffee shop, a bakery, a convenience store and a Toronto Dominion Bank branch—felt the large number of street kids hanging out there and the increasing occurrence of drug transactions and prostitution was hurting their businesses.

The Surgeon
A highly incompetent doctor (Foley) who always appears in extremely bloody surgical scrubs, bemoans the fact that he has no idea what he is doing and almost always kills his patients.

Tammy
Tammy (McCulloch) is a vapid teen pop star who sings in a breathy monotone; her songs are bland, repetitive, and somewhat nonsensical. In her first appearance, she is introduced as a protégée of Buddy Cole, but at the end of the sketch he realizes that Tammy no longer needs his help. Tammy is known for her vague, noncommittal replies to questions asked of her, and for being seemingly incapable of any complex thought. Her hits include "Dance", "Perhaps", and "Ain't Gonna Spread for No Roses".

The Two Geralds
McCulloch and McKinney played businessmen who shared both a first name and very similar personalities. Both Geralds are friendly to people's faces and condescending behind their backs. Despite the fact that they appear to work at different companies, they are friends who frequently phone each other and hang out together. Their conversation consists mainly of bouts of humorous negotiations and mockery of their associates or other business rivals.

White Trash
McCulloch plays a trashy man always looking for a fight, accusing his common-law wife (McKinney) of making fun of his height, thinking he can't provide for her, or infidelity. Their public fights are as passionate as their public reconciliations.

=== Selected other sketches ===
Anal-Probing Aliens
Two extraterrestrials (played by Foley and McDonald) are on a spaceship orbiting the Earth. They have just abducted a redneck and are in the middle of inserting a probe into his anus. After a scream of pain from the victim, they erase his memory and send him back to Earth. They then proceed to have a coffee break, during which Foley's character begins pondering the point of what they do. "We travel 250,000 light years across the universe, abduct humans, probe them anally, and release them." McDonald's alien does not understand why the other is questioning the leadership of the "Great Leader". Foley's alien goes on to say that in the 50 years they have been doing this, the only thing they have learned is that "one in 10 doesn't really seem to mind" and that he suspects their "Great Leader" may be "just some sort of twisted ass freak". Foley argues that they should at least probe political or religious leaders instead of "any idiot in a pickup truck". At the end of the sketch, they probe Paul Bellini.

The Cause of Cancer
Foley, as himself, addresses the audience and informs them that the Kids have done something very unusual for a comedy troupe; while rehearsing this past week, they discovered the cause of cancer. He brings McCulloch on stage to explain more about it. With some reluctance, McCulloch finally admits "I'm sorry I caused all that cancer."

Comfortable
Two couples, after finishing a meal together, sit down to chat. Bram (Thompson) unfastens his pants; his wife Nina (McKinney) is slightly embarrassed, but the other couple insist that it is all right, that they should not feel embarrassed about doing anything in front of old friends. Bram proceeds to take the idea to the extreme, first flirting and then copulating with the other woman (McDonald) while her unconcerned husband Tom (Foley) chats with Nina about his own impotence and his past experimentation with homosexuality. Nina, trying to join in the spirit of defying convention, confesses that she and Bram hated the lamp that the other couple once gave them; this is too much, and the party is ruined.

The Communist Threat
Foley appears as a political commentator who attempts to warn people about the continuing threat of Russia and communism.

Girl Drink Drunk
Foley plays a businessman, Ray, who is having a meeting at a bar with his boss (McDonald). His boss is telling Ray that he has been promoted to Vice President, and offers to buy him a drink. Ray demurs, saying he never drinks because he does not like the taste of alcohol. Ray's boss tells him that there are drinks "that taste like candy, girl drinks", and orders him a "Chocolate Choo Choo". Ray tries it, and soon his life is spiraling out of control as he goes from bar to bar seeking out "girl drinks". At one point, we see Ray in his office, sneaking a blender into a supply closet so he can make a margarita. Ray loses his job due to his drinking, and at the end of the sketch, we see a homeless Ray paying a kid to get him a milkshake, into which he pours some alcohol.

Love and Sausages
One of the more surreal short films in the show, containing minimal dialogue and apparently set in a dystopian future society. It features a man (McCulloch) who works at a draconian sausage factory and falls in love with a woman who works there kissing the boxes so they have the company's lipstick logo. Too nervous to talk to her, the man, who had stolen some sausages for his deranged, sausage-obsessed father (Thompson), leaves them on her doorstep anonymously. Knowing he can never lead a normal life while caring for his gibbering idiot father, he resigns himself to loneliness.

My Pen!
One sketch featured an employee (McCulloch) at a counter who loans a customer (McDonald) his ballpoint. After conducting his business, the customer absentmindedly pockets the pen and walks off. The employee sets off in a mad pursuit, all the while screaming "MY PEN!" The employee chases the customer outside, in time to see him climbing into a taxi. He has horrific fantasies of the customer sticking the pen into his ear, using it to stab a bystander, and reinserting the bloody pen into his own ear. The employee chases the taxi down the street and, leaping through the air, lands on the vehicle, holding onto the passenger side door with his finger tips. After a drive around town, the taxi pulls over, the customer issues a cursory apology before returning the pen, after which the employee curls up with it in the street, and some of his co-workers come out with a comfort blanket to collect him. The sketch ends with another customer asking for the pen, only for the audience to see that the employee now wears a large, weighty helmet with a chinstrap and a chain attached at the forehead, the other end of which secures the pen. This short film, as well as many other Kids in the Hall shorts, was directed by Michael Kennedy.

The Night the Drag Queens Took Over the World
Thompson narrates an apocalyptic monologue about a mercenary Uzi-brandishing Diana Ross impersonator (Alexander Chapman) leading a worldwide revolution of drag queens.

Reg
Five men (played by all the Kids) are sitting around a campfire in a junkyard, drinking toasts to their dead friend Reg and reminiscing about good times shared with him. Although they start out talking about typical things such as his generosity and his ice skating skill, they gradually reveal that they ritualistically murdered him.

Running Faggot
McCulloch and McKinney sing a song in a church about a "great folk hero", Running Faggot (Thompson). Running Faggot unrelentingly aids various people while running through the wilderness, including a boy whose puppy is hungry (McDonald) by suggesting he feed it puppy food, and a gunman (Foley) surrounded by "ten thousand angry Indians on all sides" by suggesting simply "talking to them". The sketch was written by McCulloch, who had written with Thompson (who is openly gay).

The Daves I Know
While singing a song, McCulloch walks around a city block, introducing the camera to his many acquaintances called 'Dave'. One of these Daves, Dave Capisano, is unfamiliar to McCulloch, who sings "I hardly know him", then looks vaguely uncomfortable for the rest of the song's lyricless measure. Foley shows up with the rest of the Daves despite never being mentioned in the song. The song was later included on McCulloch's 1995 album, Shame-Based Man, along with other KiTH-related material.

Trappers
Jacques (Foley) and François (McDonald) are colonial-era French trappers who paddle a canoe through the cube farm of an office building in a modern-day city, hunting businessmen and women for their pelts (their expensive designer suits). Upon seeing a maimed businessman hobble away after chewing off his own leg to free himself from a bear trap, Jacques tells François to let him go, as his strong spirit may one day make him vice-president. At night, the trappers make camp around a campfire in the office and promise each other not to over hunt this new game like they did the beaver in times past. At the end of the sketch, Foley and McDonald paddle their canoe to a local clothier owned by Thompson, and reveal their bounty, including "many fine Armani" from "yesterday's kill". They like to sing the song "Alouette" (which appropriately enough, originated with the French-Canadian fur trade). Foley and McDonald would later reprise the characters opposite Thompson's Buddy Cole in the episode-length sketch "Chalet 2000".

=== Running gags ===
- As the show was produced in Toronto, there are numerous references to the city's professional sports teams, the Blue Jays and the Maple Leafs.
- The phrase "took me to a Leafs game" was used as a euphemism for an attempted male-on-male sexual encounter. The gag originated in a sketch in which Thompson played a homophobic man who took offense at another man's (McKinney) attempt to seduce him by taking him to a Maple Leafs game: "Every time I come to this city, some guy picks me up at the bus station, takes me to a Leaf game, gets me pissed (drunk), then tries to blow me. Why can't people like me for me?"
- In the Cheers argument, two characters argue which leading actress was better in the show, Shelley Long or Kirstie Alley. The argument stems from an inside joke between Foley and McDonald, who debated this issue in real life. Cheers and its leading ladies are mentioned in multiple episodes by multiple characters, such as Francesca Fiore, the Police Department officers, and the Kids portraying themselves.

== Home media ==
A&E Home Video released the entire series as a Region 1 20-disc DVD box set titled The Kids in the Hall: Complete Series Megaset 1989–1994, on October 31, 2006. The HBO special pilot was released on DVD on August 14, 2007, through Medialink Entertainment, a VDI Entertainment Company, in a special "Headcrushing" edition. It had never been released on home video before. Medium Rare Entertainment released a Region 2 "best of" DVD on September 24, 2007. Rights to The Kids in the Hall are owned by Broadway Video. A tour-exclusive DVD, produced in cooperation with Crackle and released as a part of the "Live As We'll Ever Be!" tour (2008), features the 50-minute retrospective and Q&A held on January 26, 2008.

On February 13, 2018, Mill Creek Entertainment released The Kids in the Hall – The Complete Collection. The 12-disc set features all 102 episodes of the series, the reunion miniseries Death Comes to Town as well as bonus features.

DVD name	No. of episodes	Release date
Kids in the Hall: Same Guys, New Dresses		2000
Kids in the Hall: Brain Candy (1996)		2002
Kids in the Hall: Tour of Duty		2002
Pilot episode (HBO Special)	1	August 14, 2007
Season 1	20 + 2 best-of episodes	April 27, 2004
Season 2	20 + 2 best-of episodes	November 16, 2004
Season 3	20 + 2 best-of episodes	October 25, 2005
Season 4	20 + 2 best-of episodes	May 30, 2006
Season 5	21 + 1 best-of episode	October 31, 2006
The Complete Series	101 + 9 best-of episodes	October 31, 2006
SF Sketchfest Tribute: The Kids in the Hall		2008
Season 1		2011
Season 2		2011
Season 3		2011
Season 4		2011
Season 5		2011
The Complete Series Megaset		May 24, 2011
The Kids in the Hall: The Complete Collection	All episodes uncensored plus the original pilot, season compilations & Death Comes to Town	February 13, 2018

== Series finale ==
The final episode of the original run featured resolutions for several recurring characters, including Armada, Buddy Cole, and the secretaries of AT & Love. As the closing credits play, the cast is shown being buried alive, below a headstone reading The Kids in the Hall TV Show 1989–1995 (though the pilot aired in 1988). At the episode's conclusion, guest character Paul Bellini, one of the show's writers, dances on their grave and speaks for the first time: "Thank God that's finally over!"

== Reception and legacy ==
The series won the 1993 Rose d'Or, awarded in Montreux, Switzerland. It was nominated for the Gemini Award for Best Comedy Series every year from 1992 to 1996, winning twice in 1993 and 1994. The series was nominated in 1993, 1994 and 1995 for the Primetime Emmy Award for Outstanding Writing for a Variety Series.

A number of comedy writers and performers have listed The Kids in the Hall among their influences, including Dan Guterman and the creators of the TV series South Park and Portlandia.

Martin Musgrave, a reviewer for the Chicago Sun-Times, wrote: ""The Kids in the Hall" is one of the most influential and underrated comedy programs of all time."

The Chicago-based sketch comedy trio Hey You Millionaires (2004-2011) was named after the first sketch aired on the show, in which a man (McCulloch) looks out the window to see three millionaires (Foley, McDonald and Thompson) rummaging through his garbage cans out his window (a spoof on Toronto's raccoon problem), and shouts "Hey, you millionaires! Get out of that garbage!", causing the three to run away.

In a 2000 interview, Thompson stated that the series, and the troupe, had influenced many comedians, but lamented that this had not translated into material success for the troupe, saying "We thought we were going to be Nirvana, but really, we were Sonic Youth."

A documentary film chronicling the history of the troupe, The Kids in the Hall: Comedy Punks, was released in 2022.

== Revival ==
On March 5, 2020, Amazon Prime Video announced that it had greenlit an eight-episode season of The Kids in the Hall, with all five members returning along with Lorne Michaels as executive producer. It is the first Canadian series for Amazon Prime Video. It premiered on May 13, 2022. Kelly Makin and Aleysa Young serve as directors.

In addition to the core members of the troupe, the revival includes guest appearances by Paul Bellini, Pete Davidson, Catherine O'Hara, Kenan Thompson, Brandon Ash-Mohammed, Will Forte, Catherine Reitman, Samantha Bee, Fred Armisen, Paul Sun-Hyung Lee, Jay Baruchel, Eddie Izzard, Tracee Ellis Ross, Mark Hamill, Colin Mochrie, Kenneth Welsh and comedy group TallBoyz II Men.

== See also ==
- Kids in the Hall: Brain Candy
- The Kids in the Hall: Death Comes to Town
- SCTV
- The Vacant Lot
