= DoUlike2watch.com =

- Written by: Paul Bellini; Josh Levy
- Directed by: Josh Levy
- Country of origin: Canada
- Original language: English

Production
- Producer: David Dean
- Editor: Ken Wanninger
- Running time: 82 minutes

Original release
- Release: 2003

DoUlike2watch.com is a 2003 Canadian film. Directed by Josh Levy, it was filmed in 2002 in Toronto, Ontario. Co-authored by Levy and Paul Bellini, the play had a cast including PJ DeBoy and Nina Arsenault.
