= Buddy Cole (character) =

Fictional character

Charles Budderick "Buddy" Cole is a fictional character created and portrayed by Canadian actor-comedian Scott Thompson. He is an effeminate, gay socialite, made famous on The Kids in the Hall, a popular Canadian sketch comedy series starring the troupe of the same name. The character also had a recurring role on The Colbert Report. He was loosely based on one of Thompson's romantic partners.

== Fictional biography ==
According to the book Buddy Babylon, Cole was the youngest of 23 children born to pig farmers in St-Hubert-sur-le-Lac, Quebec. His hard-partying lifestyle once led him into a brief lavender marriage with a Hollywood actress named Tandy; from that marriage, he is stepfather to conjoined twins named Suzanne and Pleshette.

Buddy owns a gay bar, Buddy's, which he purchased with money saved during a brief stint of not smoking cigarettes.

According to the "Chalet 2000" episode of The Kids in the Hall, a full-length adventure starring Buddy and friends, Buddy is the nephew of comedian Rip Taylor.

== On The Kids in the Hall ==
Most of Buddy Cole's appearances in The Kids in the Hall are monologues delivered from his gay bar, Buddy's. These monologues tend to involve reflections on his personal life and the gay community. He also frequently drops celebrity names, insinuating that he has many close friendships with the rich and famous. A series of The Kids in the Hall sketches portrayed his deeply personal relationship with Queen Elizabeth II (also played by Thompson).

During the second season of The Kids in the Hall, Buddy began to star in more action-packed sketches. In the first such appearance, he becomes the substitute coach of a lesbian softball team. From there on, his adventures became more outrageous and surreal, from accidentally murdering a drag queen (while on a bad acid trip) to purchasing his very own male slave in the 1950s.

In the series' final episode, he is one in a handful of characters to get something of a resolution: Having lost his bar in a game of strip poker (he refused to remove his shirt having just put on ten pounds), he burns it down in order to win back his old boyfriend - "a firefighter from Buffalo". Also, in the last sketch is a childhood photo of Kurt Cobain (an acquaintance of Thompson's), sitting on the bar as it burns down.

== After the TV series ==
Following the conclusion of the television series in 1995, Buddy Cole made regular appearances in Scott Thompson's one-man stage show. Buddy has been one of many characters revived for The Kids in the Hall reunion tours; he did not, however, appear in the troupe's 1996 film Kids in the Hall: Brain Candy or their 2010 reunion miniseries The Kids in the Hall: Death Comes to Town. He did appear in a sketch in the 2022 Amazon Prime revival of The Kids in the Hall, reminiscing about the changes in the gay village over the years as he walks down the street with a friend, before they unexpectedly come across the last remaining glory hole.

In 1994, Thompson appeared in character as Buddy Cole in Bruce LaBruce's film Super 8½.

In 1998, Thompson and Paul Bellini co-authored the book Buddy Babylon: The Autobiography of Buddy Cole.

In early 2006, Breakthrough Entertainment, the producers of the series Atomic Betty and Paradise Falls, announced that an animated comedy series based on the character was in development. Buddy's was expected to air on CBC Television and the American LGBT channel Here!. However, in a February 1, 2007 interview on Tom Green Live, Thompson announced that the series was no longer in development. No reason for the dissolution of the show was given, but Thompson did say that Buddy Cole now had his own blog instead, written and updated by Thompson himself.

On January 13, 2008, Thompson posted a video blog as Cole. However, it was also his last; as announced in the video (titled "Adieu to EWE"), Cole simply did not have enough time to blog.

In February 2014, Thompson appeared in character as Buddy Cole on several episodes of The Colbert Report, serving as the program's correspondent to the 2014 Winter Olympics in Sochi, Russia. His coverage focused on Russia's anti-gay laws, including interviewing openly gay Ambassador Daniel Baer of the Organization for Security and Cooperation in Europe.

In 2018, Thompson toured the stage show Après Le Déluge: The Buddy Cole Monologues, and released a new reprint of Buddy Babylon.

In 2022, he appeared Netflix's LGBTQ+ comedy special hosted by Billy Eichner Stand Out: An LGBTQ+ Celebration along with Bob the Drag Queen, Mae Martin, Margaret Cho, Trixie Mattel, Joel Kim Booster, Sam Jay, Tig Notaro, Gina Yashere, Matteo Lane, Eddie Izzard, Marsha Warfield, Patti Harrison, Guy Branum, Solomon Georgio, Judy Gold, Wanda Sykes, Lily Tomlin, and Sandra Bernhard.

== Reception ==
Thompson has described Buddy as a "butch queen" and an "alpha fag", pointing out that while extremely effeminate, Buddy is also very forceful and strong willed. Thompson, who is openly gay, has always directly confronted charges that Buddy is a homophobic stereotype. "The whole idea of Buddy Cole being considered a terrible stereotype and a terrible throwback is, I think, just tragic," he told Orlando Weekly in 2000. "I mean, most gay men are more Buddy than Sly."
