= Fuse =

Fuse or FUSE may refer to:

== Devices ==
- Fuse (electrical), a device used in electrical systems to protect against excessive current
  - Fuse (automotive), a class of fuses for vehicles
- Fuse (hydraulic), a device used in hydraulic systems to protect against sudden loss of fluid pressure
- Fuse (explosives) or fuze, the part of the device that initiates function
- Fuze or fuse, a mechanism for exploding military munitions such as bombs, shells, and mines

== Computing ==
- Fuse ESB, an open-source integration platform based on Apache Camel
- Filesystem in Userspace, a virtual file system interface for Unix-like operating systems
- Fuse (emulator), the Free Unix Spectrum Emulator of the ZX Spectrum
- Fuse Internet Service, a former Cincinnati Bell Internet service provider based in Cincinnati, Ohio, United States
- Fuse Universal, a learning platform
- Adobe Fuse CC, formerly Fuse Character Creator, 3D computer graphics program, originally developed by Mixamo, used to create 3D characters.
- e-fuse

== Science ==
- Far Ultraviolet Spectroscopic Explorer, a space-based ultraviolet telescope and spectroscope
- Intramembranous ossification, the fusing of bones of the skeletal system
- Cell fusion, several biological cells combining
- Fuse (thermonuclear)
- Fused compound, a class of multi-ring chemical structures

== Entertainment ==
- Fuse (film), a 2003 film by Pjer Žalica, original Bosnian title Gori vatra
- Fuses (film), a 1967 experimental film by Carolee Schneemann
- Fuse Teppō Musume no Torimonochō, a 2012 Japanese animated film
- Fuse (magazine), a Canadian arts and culture magazine

=== Music ===
- Fuse (band), an American rock group
- Fuse (Fuse album), 1970
- Fuse (Joe Henry album), 1999
- Fuse (Colin James album), 2000
- Fuse (Everything but the Girl album), 2023
- Fuse (Keith Urban album), 2013
- The Fuse (band), a band from the East of Scotland
- The Fuse (album), by Pennywise, 2005
- Fused (album), a 2005 album by Tony Iommi
- F.U.S.E., an alias for electronic artist Richie Hawtin
- Fuse Festival, an Australian contemporary music event
- Fuse (club), an electronic dance music club in Brussels
- "Fuse", an instrumental by Chaz Jankel from his 1980 album Chas Jankel
- "The Fuse", a song by Bruce Springsteen from his 2002 album The Rising
- "The Fuse", a song by Jackson Browne from his 1976 album The Pretender
- "The Fuse", a song by Heaven 17 from their 1984 album How Men Are
- "Fuse", a song by Linkin Park from their 1997 Xero demo tape

=== Radio and television ===
- Fuse (TV channel), an American cable television station
- Fuse (radio program), a musical radio program on CBC
- The Fuse (game show), a UK game show broadcast on ITV1

=== Games ===
- Fuse Games, a game developer
- Fuse (video game), a video game by Insomniac Games
- Fuse, a playable character in the game Apex Legends
- FUSE, a card and dice game by Renegade Game Studios

== Other uses ==
- Fuse, a consumer electronics company started by Tony Fadell
- Fuse (chocolate bar), a brand of chocolate bar made by Cadbury
- Fuse (surname), a Japanese surname
- Fuse, Shimane, a village located in Oki District, Shimane, Japan
- FUSE Glass Prize, an Australian prize for glass art
- Fuse Station, a station in Osaka, Japan
- Scion Fuse, a concept car

== See also ==
- Fews, Swedish-American rock band
- Flare, also known as a fusee
- Fusee (disambiguation)
- Fusion (disambiguation)
- Fuze (disambiguation)
