= Then Again... =

Compilation album by Colin James
- Released: 1995
- Genre: Rock; blues; R&B; jump blues; swing revival; blues rock; rock and roll
- Length: 50:23
- Label: Virgin
- Producer: Terry Manning

Colin James chronology
Bad Habits (1995)	Then Again... (1995)	National Steel (1997)

Then Again... is a compilation album of Colin James's greatest hits released in 1995. Three songs were recorded for and first released on this album: "I Hope You're Happy", "Stay", and "Milk Cow Calf Blues".

== Track listing ==
1. "Just Came Back" – 4:56
2. "I Hope You're Happy" – 4:36
3. "Stay" – 4:40
4. "Keep On Lovin' Me Baby" ^{[2]} – 3:40
5. "Why'd You Lie" – 5:25
6. "Five Long Years" ^{[1]} – 4:36
7. "Crazy Over You" ^{[2]} – 5:11
8. "Down In The Bottom" ^{[1]} – 4:37
9. "Cadillac Baby" – 3:12
10. "No More Doggin'" ^{[3]} – 3:09
11. "Voodoo Thing" ^{[1]} – 3:38
12. "Milk Cow Calf Blues" – 2:43
- ^{a} ^{b} ^{c} originally released on Colin James
- ^{a} ^{b} originally released on Sudden Stop
- ^{a} originally released on Colin James and the Little Big Band

== Certifications ==
Certifications for Then Again
Region	Certification	Certified units/sales
Canada (Music Canada)	Platinum	100,000^{^}
^{^} Shipments figures based on certification alone.
