= Doug James (musician) =

American songwriter (born 1953)

- Also known as: Mr. Low
- Born: Douglas James Schlecht; August 21, 1953 (age 72); Turlock, California, United States
- Genres: Blues, rhythm and blues
- Occupations: Saxophonist, songwriter, arranger, record producer, audio engineer
- Instruments: Baritone saxophone, tenor saxophone, bass clarinet
- Years active: 1970s–present
- Label: Various

Douglas James Schlecht (born August 21, 1953), known professionally as Doug James, is an American blues and rhythm and blues baritone saxophonist, songwriter, arranger, record producer and audio engineer. In a career spanning 50 years, James has played on many albums, including those recorded by Roomful of Blues, Duke Robillard, Jimmie Vaughan, Joe Louis Walker, Colin James, Pat Benatar, The Fabulous Thunderbirds, and many others. In addition, James has released four albums bearing his name.

On stage, James has backed blues musicians including Eddie "Cleanhead" Vinson, Big Joe Turner, LaVern Baker, Helen Humes, Colin James, Freddie King, Charlie Musselwhite, Stevie Ray Vaughan, Junior Walker, Muddy Waters and Jimmy Witherspoon. James has had five nominations for a Grammy Award and received a W. C. Handy Award.

== Biography ==
He was born in Turlock, California, United States. His mother, who was the organist in his father's church, encouraged James to have an interest in music, although he became largely self-taught on the saxophone. He eventually favoured the baritone saxophone, but has been recorded playing tenor saxophone and bass clarinet, as required. In 1960, James had heard Pepper Adams saxophone solo on Charlie Mingus' "Moanin'", and this experience prompted James to play the baritone. In his youth, James parents relocated to Oregon, before moving again to Rhode Island. It was in Rhode Island in 1970, when Duke Robillard was expanding his fledgling group, Roomful of Blues, to include a horn section, that he met James. He was nicknamed "Mr. Low", after a song Joe Williams had recorded with the Red Saunders Orchestra in August 1950, called "Blow, "Mr. Low-Blow"". James's connection with Roomful of Blues continued, albeit intermittently, until 1998. He recorded twelve albums with the ensemble, including Eddie "Cleanhead" Vinson & Roomful of Blues (1982). Through his connections to Roomful of Blues, James also got the opportunity to back Roy Brown, Helen Humes, LaVern Baker, and Jimmy Witherspoon.

In 1998, James reunited with his mentor, Robillard, and played in his band a mixture of baritone and tenor saxophones and bass clarinet. He toured with Robillard's band and recorded several albums with him. In addition, James recorded pieces with Eddy Clearwater, Toni Lynn Washington, Jerry Portnoy, Jimmy "T99" Nelson, Jay McShann, Debbie Davies, Billy Boy Arnold, Kim Wilson, and Bryan Lee. Opportunities to take part in various 'W.C. Handy All-Stars' touring ensembles saw James play the saxophone behind a varied mix of artists, such as Charlie Musselwhite, Little Milton, Ruth Brown, Joe Louis Walker, Trudy Lynn, and Johnnie Johnson.

In 2001, Stony Plain Records invited James to record his debut solo album for them, and he assembled a few former Roomful of Blues musicians to fill out the sound. These included "Sax" Gordon Beadle, with whom James went on to record three joint ventures in the ensuing years. The album, Blow Mr. Low, contained tracks where James played tribute to his heroes such as Paul Williams, Haywood Henry, and Leo Parker, and had a stab at the Smiley Lewis track, "Dirty Dirty People". James wrote four of the ten tracks plus, with Robillard, co-penned one other.

On the original soundtrack album, Martin Scorsese Presents the Blues: The Road to Memphis (2003), the final track was Rosco Gordon's "Now You're Gone", performed by an ensemble consisting of Gordon (vocals, piano), Robillard (guitars), John Packer (bass), Jeffrey McAllister (drums), with James and Beadle (saxophones).

James has continued to tour and record albums with Robillard, such as on the November 2020 release, Blues Bash with Duke Robillard & Friends. He also leads the Doug James Big Band.

In the 2021 Blues Music Awards, he had a nomination in the 'Instrumentalist - Horn' category. The 'virtual' ceremony took place on June 6, 2021.

== Discography ==
=== Albums ===
Year of release	Album title	Record label	Credited to
2001	Blow Mr. Low	Stony Plain Records	Doug James
2005	Doug James & Sax Gordon	Self-released	Doug James & Sax Gordon
2006	Swing Jump Jive	North Star Music	Doug James & Sax Gordon
2006	Jolly Jump Jive: A Swingin' Rockin' Goodtime Christmas	North Star Music	Sax Gordon & Doug James

=== Selected other recording credits ===
James has contributed to over 70 albums, variously as audio engineer, songwriter, record producer, arranger, and musician. He is sometimes confused, in several listings, with other musicians of a similar name.

Year of release	Album title	Credited to
1981	Butt Rockin'	The Fabulous Thunderbirds
1982	T-Bird Rhythm	The Fabulous Thunderbirds
1982	Eddie "Cleanhead" Vinson & Roomful of Blues	Eddie "Cleanhead" Vinson
1991	True Love	Pat Benatar
1993	Colin James and the Little Big Band	Colin James
1995	Bad Habits	Colin James
1996	Different Tacos	The Fabulous Thunderbirds
1997	Live at Carnegie Hall	Stevie Ray Vaughan & Double Trouble
1999	Synchronistic Wanderings	Pat Benatar
2006	Colin James & The Little Big Band 3	Colin James
2011	Plays More Blues, Ballads & Favorites	Jimmie Vaughan
2017	Colin James & The Little Big Band: Christmas	Colin James
