= Colin James (disambiguation) =

Colin James (born 1964) is a Canadian musician.

Colin James may also refer to:

== People ==
- Col James (architect) (1936–2013), an Australian architect, educator, and activist
- Colin James (bishop) (1926–2009), Bishop of Wakefield, 1977–1985, and Winchester, 1985–1995
- Colin James (journalist) (born 1944), New Zealand journalist

== Other uses ==
- Colin James (album), the 1988 debut album from Canadian musician Colin James
