= Toni Lynn Washington =

American blues singer (born 1937)

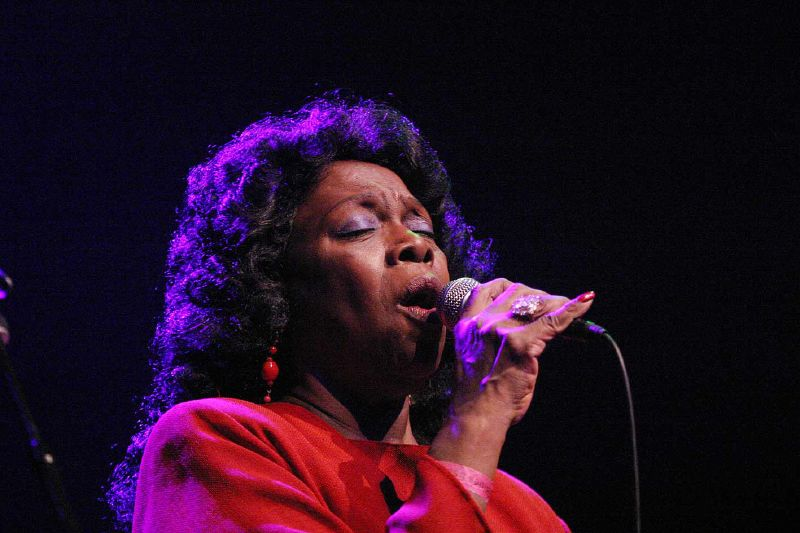
- Photo by Tom Beetz

Background information
- Born: Dorothy Helen Leak; December 6, 1937 (age 87); Southern Pines, North Carolina, United States
- Genres: Blues, R&B, jazz
- Occupation: Singer-songwriter
- Instrument: Vocals
- Years active: 1980–present
- Labels: NorthernBlues
- Website: Myspace page

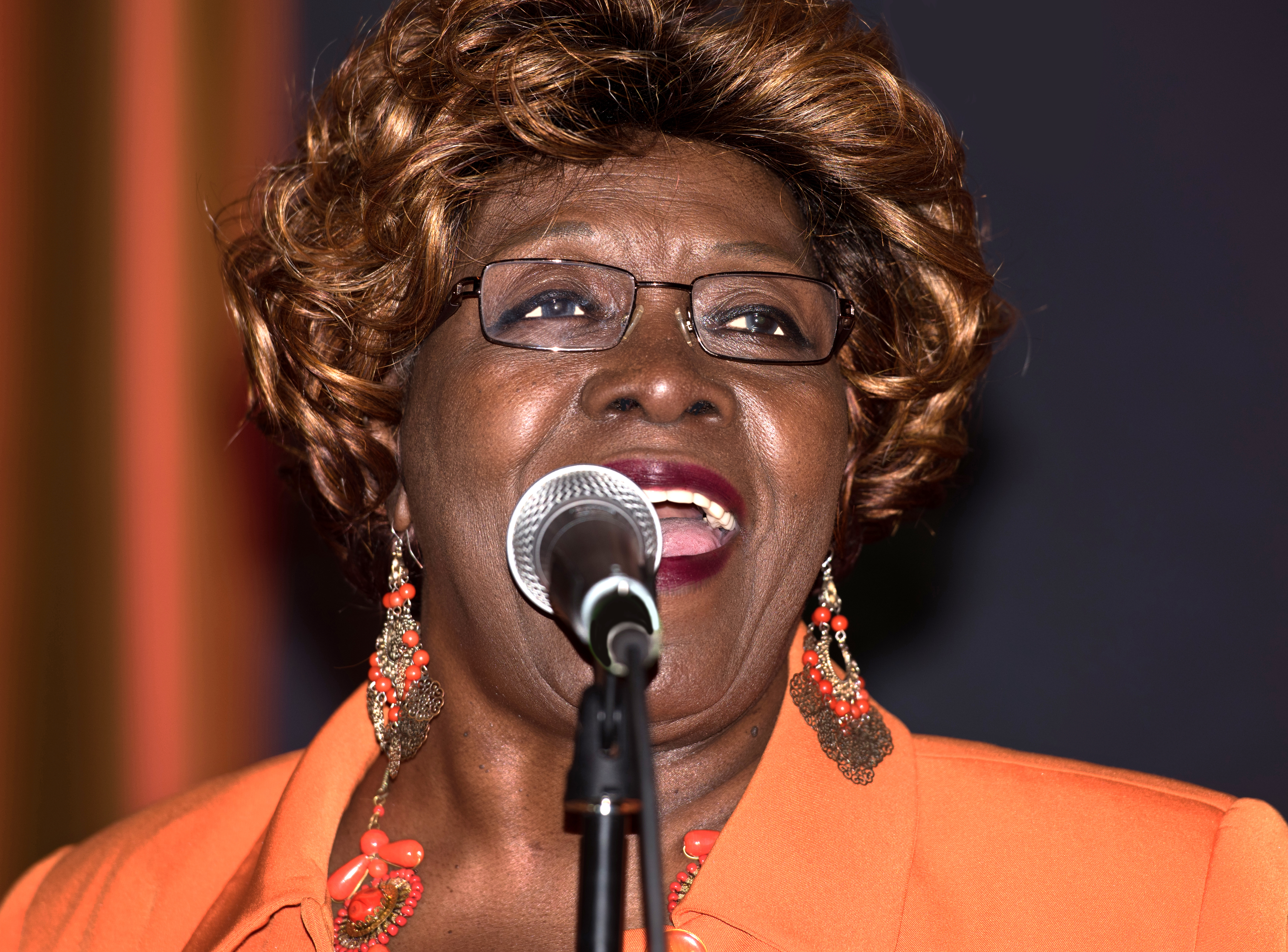
Toni Lynn Washington in Stockholm Sweden May 2016

Toni Lynn Washington (born Dorothy Helen Leak, December 6, 1937, Southern Pines, North Carolina) is an American blues singer.

== Musical career ==
Washington took to music at an early age, singing with her school and church choirs at St. John Missionary Baptist Church in Roxbury, NC. At the age of thirteen, her family moved to Boston in 1950, where she began to sing in clubs. The artist got married after graduating high school. Her husband was a Navy officer, which forced moves to Pensacola, Florida, Norfolk, Virginia, and other locations.

Once relocated in New Orleans, Louisiana, Washington's performances allowed her to sign with Kon-Ti Records. Her first single with the label Dear Diary (1966) made its way into the Billboard Hot 100 1966. In the early 1980's, the blues singer returned to Boston, Massachusetts, where she continued her musical career. Later in the decade, she was the lead singer for the band Boston Baked Blues.

In 1992, her and keyboard artist Bruce Bears of the Boston Baked Blues formed their own band. Three years later in 1995, she released her debut album Blues at Midnight. This was her first of four albums released over a decade.

She has had seven Blues Music Award nominations. Washington received the 1999 Boston Blues Festival Lifetime Achievement Award. In 2003 she released her fourth CD since 1997, and her first on the NorthernBlues label.

== Albums ==
- Blues at Midnight (1995, Tone-Cool Records, a Rounder Records subsidiary)
- It's My Turn Now (1997, Tone-Cool Records)
- Good Things (2000, Tone-Cool Records)
- Been So Long (2003, NorthernBlues Music)

== Main band members ==
- Keyboards: Bruce Bears
- Guitar: Duke Robillard, Kevin Belz, and Mike Null
- Saxophone: Charles Langford, Gordon Beadle, and Doug James
- Trumpet: Scott Aruda
- Drums: Dave Jamrog and Mark Texeira
- Bass: Jesse Williams, Sven Larson and Steve Cuoco
- Record producer: Duke Robillard and Bruce Bears

== Blues Music Award nominations ==
- 1999 Boston Blues Festival Lifetime Achievement Award
- 1999 "Outstanding Blues Album"
- 2003 "Soul-Blues Female Performer of the Year"
- 2004 "Soul-Blues Female Performer of the Year"
- 2005 "Soul-Blues Female Performer of the Year"
- Her previous albums for "Album of the Year"
