= Colin James & The Little Big Band 3 =

Studio album by Colin James
- Released: 3 October 2006
- Recorded: 2005
- Genres: Swing revival; Jump blues
- Length: 44:20
- Label: MapleMusic Recordings
- Producers: Colin Linden; Colin James

Colin James chronology
Limelight (2005)	Colin James & The Little Big Band 3 (2006)	Colin James & The Little Big Band: Christmas (2007)

Colin James & The Little Big Band 3 is the tenth studio album by Canadian blues/rock musician Colin James and the third Little Big Band album with its swing/jive themes. It was released in 2006. The album debuted at #30 on the Canadian Albums Chart.

== Track listing ==
1. "Reet Petite"
2. "I'm Shakin'"
3. "Where Y'At"
4. "I Will Be There"
5. "Lonely Avenue"
6. "I Want You To Be My Baby"
7. "That's Where It's At"
8. "Please, Baby Don't Do That"
9. "No Buts, No Maybes"
10. "That's What Love Is Made Of"
11. "The Night Is Young (And You're So Fine)"
12. "Feelin' Good"
13. "If You Need Me"

== Personnel ==
- Colin James - vocals, electric guitar, guitar solos
- Bob Ruggiero - drums
- Jeff Sarli - upright bass
- Chuck Leavell - piano (tracks 1, 3, 4, 9), organ (track 7)
- Reese Wynans - piano (tracks 2, 6, 7, 8, 10, 11, 12, 13), organ
- Colin Linden - rhythm guitar
- Greg Piccolo - tenor saxophone
- Doug James - baritone saxophone
- Steve Hilliam - tenor saxophone
- Terry Townson - trumpet
- Roy Agee - trombone
- John Whynot - organ (tracks 5, 13)
- Mark T. Jordan - piano (track 5)
- Wayne Jackson - trumpet (track 5)
- Keb' Mo' - harmony vocal (track 7)
