= National Steel =

National Steel may refer to:

- National Steel Corporation (1929), a defunct steel production company in the United States
- National Steel Corporation (Philippines), a defunct steel production company established 1974
- National Steel Company (1899), a predecessor of U.S. Steel, merged in 1901
- National Steel and Shipbuilding Company, a shipyard in San Diego, California
- National Steel (album), a blues album by Colin James
- National Steel, a type of guitar made by the National String Instrument Corporation
- "National Steel", a song by Kathleen Edwards on the album Failer
