= Blue Mood =

Blue Mood may refer to:

- "Blue Mood" (song), a 1985 song by Swing Out Sister
- Blue Mood: The Songs of T-Bone Walker, a 2004 album by Duke Robillard
- Blue Moods, a 1955 album by Miles Davis

== See also ==
- In a Blue Mood, a 1955 album by Kay Starr
