= Fuze (disambiguation) =

A fuze is a device to detonate military munitions.

Fuze may also refer to:

- Fuse (disambiguation)
- Fuze Beverage, a manufacturer of teas and non-carbonated fruit drinks enriched with vitamins
- Fuze (company), a provider of cloud-based unified communications as a service
- Sansa Fuze, a digital audio player
- DJ Fuze
- HTC Touch Pro or AT&T Fuze, a smartphone
- Nickname of David Fiuczynski
- Fuze (film), a 2025 British crime thriller film

== See also ==
- Fuse (disambiguation)
- Fuzes (disambiguation)
