= I Want a Little Girl =

I Want a Little Girl may refer to:

- "I Want a Little Girl" (song), 1930 song by Murray Mencher and lyrics by Billy Moll
- I Want a Little Girl, 1968 album by T-Bone Walker
- I Want a Little Girl (Eddie "Cleanhead" Vinson album), 1978 album by Eddie "Cleanhead" Vinson
