= Catweasel =

Catweasel may refer to:

- Individual Computers Catweasel, a floppy disk controller
- Catweazle, a children's television series
