= Twenty Five Live =

Live album by Colin James
- Released: 2013
- Recorded: November 8–10, 2012
- Venue: Commodore Ballroom in Vancouver, British Columbia
- Genre: Rock, blues, R&B jump blues, swing revival, blues rock, rock and roll
- Length: 1:13:33
- Label: EMI Music Canada / EMI Group plc
- Producer: Joe Hardy and Colin James

Twenty Five Live includes 16 of Colin James' biggest fan favorites, recorded live over a sold-out three-night stand at the Commodore Ballroom in Vancouver, British Columbia, in November 2012.

== Track listing ==
1. "Saviour" – 4:09
2. "Sweets Gone Sour" – 4:26
3. "I'm Diggin'" – 4:06
4. "Fool for You" – 3:45
5. "Sneakin' Sally Through the Alley" – 3:56
6. "Shed a Little Light" - 4:15
7. "Man's Gotta be a Stone" – 4:44
8. "Freedom" – 5:08
9. "Why'd You Lie" – 5:27
10. "Oh Well" – 3:56
11. "It Ain't Over Yet'" – 4:11
12. "Bad Habits" – 4:47
13. "Stones in My Passway / Just Came Back" – 6:27
14. "Into the Mystic" - 4:31
15. "Johnny Coolman" - 3:32
16. "Ain't Nothing You Can Do" - 6:09

== Personnel ==
- Colin James - guitars, vocals, harmonica
- Chris Caddell - guitar and backing vocals
- Simon Kendall - piano, Wurlitzer, clavinet, Hammond organ
- Maury Lafoy - bass and backing vocals
- Steve Hilliam - saxes, acoustic guitar, percussion, backing vocals
- Jerry Cook - saxes, percussion, backing vocals
- Al Webster - drums
