= Eddie "Cleanhead" Vinson & Roomful of Blues =

1982 studio album

Studio album by Eddie "Cleanhead" Vinson and Roomful of Blues
- Released: 1982
- Recorded: January 22, 1982
- Studio: JAC Recording, Inc., New York City, NY
- Genre: Jazz
- Length: 38:26
- Label: Muse; MR 5282
- Producer: Bob Porter

Eddie "Cleanhead" Vinson chronology
I Want a Little Girl (1981)	Eddie "Cleanhead" Vinson & Roomful of Blues (1982)	Blues in the Night Volume One: The Early Show (1986)

Eddie "Cleanhead" Vinson & Roomful of Blues is an album by saxophonist/vocalist Eddie "Cleanhead" Vinson and blues big band Roomful of Blues which was recorded and released by the Muse label in 1978.

== Reception ==
Professional ratings
Review scores
Source	Rating
AllMusic	4.5/5 stars

The retrospective AllMusic review by Scott Yanow stated "If there were justice in the world, Eddie "Cleanhead" Vinson would have been able to tour with this type of group throughout much of his career. Roomful of Blues, a popular five-horn nonet, has rarely sounded more exciting than on this musical meeting with the legendary singer/altoist. Vinson himself is exuberant on some of the selections ... Whether one calls it blues, bebop, or early R&B, this accessible music is very enjoyable and deserves to be more widely heard".

== Track listing ==
1. "House of Joy" (Bernie Hanighen, Cootie Williams) – 3:18
2. "He Was a Friend of Mine" (Hank Crawford) – 3:20
3. "Movin' with Lester" (Lester Young) – 7:00
4. "No Bones" (Al Copley, Ronnie Horvath) – 5:52
5. "That's the Groovy Thing" (Earl Bostic) – 4:24
6. "Past Sixty Blues" (Art Hillery) – 4:22
7. "Street Lights" (Eddie Davis) – 6:27
8. "Farmer's Daughter Blues" (Stan Seltzer) – 3:43

== Personnel ==
- Eddie "Cleanhead" Vinson – alto saxophone, vocals
- Bob Enos – trumpet
- Porky Cohen – trombone
- Rich Lataille – alto saxophone
- Greg Piccolo – tenor saxophone
- Doug James – baritone saxophone
- Ronnie Earl Horvath – guitar
- Al Copley – piano
- Jimmy Wimpfheimer – bass
- John Rossi – drums
