= Individual Computers =

Individual Computers is a German computer hardware company specializing in retrocomputing accessories for the Commodore 64, Amiga, and PC platforms. Individual Computers produced the C-One reconfigurable computer in 2003. The company is owned and run by Jens Schönfeld.

== Products ==
- Catweasel – Universal format floppy disk drive controller card
- Retro Replay – Improved version of the C64 Action Replay cartridge
- Clone-A – Amiga in FPGA website (coming soon?)
  - See the PDF extract of Total Amiga Magazine issue 25
- MMC64 – MMC and SD Card reader cartridge
- MMC Replay – MMC64 and Retro Replay combined in one cartridge, with some improvements
- Micromys – An adapter that allows connecting PS/2 compatible mice (including wheel-support) to C64 and Amiga joystick-ports (and all other computers that share the same pin-configuration).
- Amiga clock port compatible addons for MMC64, Retro Replay and MMC Replay:
  - RR-Net: A C64-compatible Network-Interface. Comes in 2 shapes, the old long RR-Net fits Retro Replay and MMC64 (though partly blocking the latter's passthrough expansionport), the new L-shaped RR-Net2 fits MMC64 and MMC Replay and was built with MMC Replay in mind.
  - Silver Surfer: Highspeed RS232 Interface for Amiga 1200 and 600 (with adapter). Fits onto Retro Replay, MMC64/Replay compatibility unknown.
  - mp3@c64: hardware mp3 decoding from SD card. Made for MMC64, Retro Replay and MMC Replay compatibility unknown.
- Keyrah – An interface that allows the connection of Commodore keyboards to USB-capable computers
- C-One – reconfigurable computer
- X-Surf – network card
- C64 Reloaded - A 1:1 rebuilt C64 motherboard with less power consumption
- Indivision – Flicker fixer for Amiga computers
- ACA boards - CPU expansion cards for Amiga computers
