= Hearts on Fire (Colin James album) =

Studio album by Colin James
- Released: February 3, 2015
- Genre: Blues, rock
- Label: Universal Music Canada

Colin James chronology
Fifteen (2012)	Hearts on Fire (2015)	Blue Highways (2016)

Hearts on Fire is the sixteenth studio album by Canadian singer Colin James, released in 2015 by Universal Music Group. The lead single was "Just A Little Love", released early as a download. "Stay" is a cover of the Rihanna song.

== Tracks ==
No.	Title	Length
1.	"Hearts on Fire"	4:54
2.	"Just A Little Love"	3:32
3.	"Dreams Come And Go"	4:08
4.	"Roll Me Sunday Morning"	4:23
5.	"Heartbreak Road"	4:27
6.	"Honey Bee"	2:56
7.	"Paper Airplanes"	3:32
8.	"Cry For Love"	4:59
9.	"How Does It Feel"	4:23
10.	"You Were Never Mine"	5:07
11.	"Stay"	4:04
12.	"I Wanna Sing"	3:12
