= Al Copley =

American blues pianist and singer

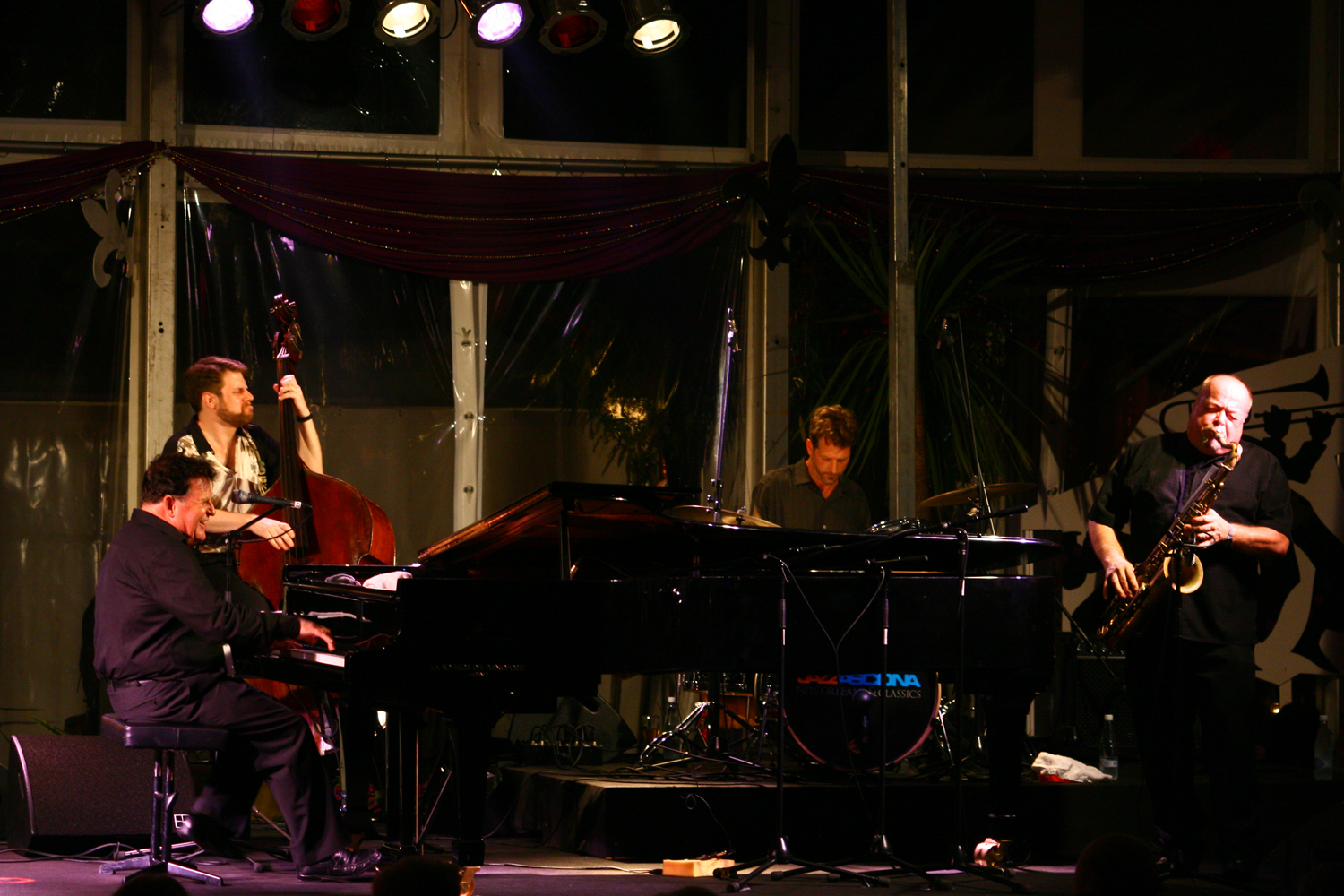
Al Copley at the piano

Al Copley (born Almon LeGrande Copley, April 29, 1952, Buffalo, New York, United States) is an American blues pianist and singer, plus arranger and co-founder of Roomful of Blues. After 16 years with Roomful, Copley relocated to Europe in 1984, and back home to the US in 2010.

Copley has been performing extensively in Europe and the northeast US since 2010, appears regularly in New England, Switzerland and Paris, and continues to develop in style and taste, always noted for energy, versatility and harmony. He has been included in Chapman Roberts' 2018 "Broadway Jazz Festival" in Manhattan with stars from Chapman's hit plays Blues in the Night, Smokey Joe's Cafe, Five Guys Named Moe and Bubbling Brown Sugar.

In 2016, Copley instigated a reunion recording of the 1970s version of Roomful of Blues. This is due to be released in 2021. The goal, according to co-founder Duke Robillard, was to "make a record equal to or better than our first record."

In June 2002 and 2009, Copley performed four of his own full symphonic orchestrations before an audience of more than 25,000 with the Boston Festival Orchestra at Summer Pops.

== Career highlights ==
Copley has twice been nominated for a Grammy Award (1983 and 1984) in the category Best Traditional Blues Album. In 1978 he performed with the original Blues Brothers, John Belushi and Dan Aykroyd, and in 1993 he opened for Eric Clapton at the Royal Albert Hall in London for 12 concerts, performing with Jimmie Vaughan. His performances on the main stage at the Montreux Jazz Festival in Montreux, Switzerland include opening for Bob Dylan in 1998, opening for Eric Clapton's Legends in 1997, doing a duo of "Jazz-Hot" with Jeff Healey in 1997, and opening the Blues Summit with Etta James and B. B. King in 1993. Copley also performed at the first Montreux Jazz Festival in Japan with George Duke and McCoy Tyner in 1998.

== Discography ==
=== Solo recordings ===
- A Handful of Keys (1986), Off Beat Records WIK 52
- Acoustic 88 (1988), Suffering Egos SE752
- Automatic Overdrive (1989), Black Top BT 1047, original edition entitled Ooh-Wow!! (1987) Suffering Egos SE751
- Rockabilly Pie (1990), Suffering Egos Records SE753
- Royal Blue (1991), Al Copley & Hal Singer, Black Top Records BT1054
- Good Understanding (1993), Al Copley & the Fabulous Thunderbirds, Bullseye Blues Records BB9596, original edition same title (1993), Suffering Egos SE754
- Live at Montreux (1994), One Mind Records OM1201
- Blue Paris Nights (1995), One Mind Records OM1202
- Rainy Summer (2000), One Mind Records OM1203
- Jump on It (2002), One Mind Records OM1204
- Radio Play (2005), One Mind Records OM1205
- Stardust (2010) One Mind Records OM1208
- Albi's Boogies (2011) (compilation) One Mind Records OM1207
- A Summer Place (2012) One Mind Records OM1212
- The Summer Wind (2015) One Mind Records 1209
- Beach Ball Blast (2016) One Mind Records OM1210
- Here's to Life (2017) One Mind Records OM1211

=== With Lou Rawls ===
- Shades of Blue (Philadelphia International Record 1980)

=== With Eddie "Cleanhead" Vinson ===
- Eddie "Cleanhead" Vinson & Roomful of Blues (Muse, 1982)
