= Traveler (Colin James album) =

Studio album by Colin James
- Released: 15 September 2003 (Canada); May 25, 2004 (United States)
- Recorded: 2003
- Genre: Blues
- Length: 50:13
- Label: Warner
- Producer: Mark Howard, Colin James

Colin James chronology
Fuse (2000)	Traveler (2003)	Limelight (2005)

Traveler, released in Canada in 2003, is the eighth studio album by Canadian blues/rock musician Colin James. The album debuted at No. 22 on the Canadian Albums Chart.

== Track listing ==
1. "I'm Losing You" (John Lennon) – 5:00
2. "Make a Mistake" (Colin James, Craig Northey) – 4:57
3. "Skydiving" (Colin James, Craig Northey, Jeff Trott) – 4:16
4. "I Know What Love Is" (Colin James, Craig Northey, T. Wilson, C. Cripps) – 3:49
5. "Black Eyed Dog" (Nick Drake) – 4:17
6. "You and Whose Army" (Colin James, Jeff Trott) – 3:45
7. "Sending a Message" (Colin James, Craig Northey) – 3:55
8. "Know How to Love You" (Colin James) – 4:11
9. "She Can't Do No Wrong" (Colin James, Craig Northey) – 3:47
10. "Anywhere Is Home" (Colin James, Craig Northey) – 4:25
11. "Rainy Day, Dream Away" (Jimi Hendrix) – 7:51

== Personnel ==
- Colin James - guitars, vocals
- Craig Northey - guitars, vocals
- Darryl Johnson - bass
- Dean Butterworth - drums
- Jeff Trott - guitar, piano, wurlitzer
- Eric Webster - organ
