= Tales from the Austin Motel =

Studio album by Debbie Davies
- Released: 1999
- Recorded: January 1999
- Genre: Blues
- Label: Shanachie

Debbie Davies chronology
Homesick for the Road (1999)	Tales from the Austin Motel (1999)	Love the Game (2001)

Tales from the Austin Motel is an album by the American musician Debbie Davies, released in 1999. Davies supported the album with a North American tour.

== Production ==
The album was recorded in Austin, Texas, over the course of two weeks in January 1999; its title refers to the motel where Davies stayed. Davies was backed by the Double Trouble musicians Chris Layton and Tommy Shannon. She was inspired by the Austin bluesman W. C. Clark. Davies wrote or cowrote seven of the songs. "I Just Want to Make Love to You" is a cover of the Willie Dixon song. "Atras de Tus Ojos (Behind Your Eyes)" is an instrumental.

== Critical reception ==
Professional ratings
Review scores
Source	Rating
AllMusic	4/5 stars
The Penguin Guide to Blues Recordings	2.5/4 stars
The Philadelphia Inquirer	3/4 stars
The Press of Atlantic City	2.5/4 stars

The Chicago Tribune concluded that "neither her deep, strong voice nor her barrage of slide solos distinguishes Davies from dozens of similar blues singer-guitarists. CMJ New Music Report called Tales from the Austin Motel a "landmark of an album [that] is certainly one of the best blues records of 1999." The Independent said that the "mostly enjoyable set of shuffles evokes the Texas tradition." The Telegram & Gazette wrote that "a fine balance is struck between the bawdy and the mournful." The Philadelphia Inquirer determined that "her economical guitar solos have plenty of bite."

AllMusic noted that "some may quibble that the recording is a little too crystal clear to really capture the nasty Austin sound they strive to achieve, but the trio does have a dynamic interplay."

== Track listing ==
No.	Title	Length
1.	"Just Stepped in the Blues"
2.	"I Want to Be Loved"
3.	"Bald Headed Baby"
4.	"Watch Out What You Do"
5.	"I Just Want to Make Love to You"
6.	"As the Years Go Passing By"
7.	"I'm a Woman"
8.	"Half Caf-Decaf"
9.	"Atras de Tus Ojos (Behind Your Eyes)"
10.	"When You Were Gone"
11.	"Percolatin'"
12.	"Walking by Myself"
