= Limelight (Colin James album) =

Studio album by Colin James
- Released: 4 October 2005
- Recorded: 2005
- Genre: Soul
- Length: 50:13
- Label: MapleMusic Recordings
- Producer: Colin Linden

Colin James chronology
Traveler (2003)	Limelight (2005)	Colin James & The Little Big Band 3 (2006)

Limelight is the ninth studio album by Canadian blues/rock musician Colin James, released on 4 October 2005. The song "Into the Mystic" was penned by Van Morrison. The album debuted at #26 on the Canadian Albums Chart.

== Track listing ==
1. "Better Way to Heaven"
2. "Watchin' the River Flow" (Bob Dylan)
3. "Limelight"
4. "Far Away Like a Radio" (Colin James, Craig Northey, Tom Wilson)
5. "On My Way Back to You"
6. "When I Write the Book" (Nick Lowe and Rockpile)
7. "Misplaced Heart"
8. "Speakeasy"
9. "Healing Time"
10. "Travelin'"
11. "Shadow of Love"
12. "It Fills You Up"
13. "Weeping Willow Tree"
14. "Into the Mystic" (Van Morrison)

== Personnel ==
- Colin James - guitars, vocals
- Jim Keltner - drums
- Reggie McBride - bass
- James "Hutch" Hutchinson - bass

== Certifications ==
Certifications for Limelight
Region	Certification	Certified units/sales
Canada (Music Canada)	Gold	50,000^{^}
^{^} Shipments figures based on certification alone.
