= Bad Habits (Colin James album) =

Studio album by Colin James
- Released: 1995
- Studio: Compass Point (Nassau)
- Genre: Blues
- Length: 47:33
- Label: Warner
- Producer: Chris Kimsey

Colin James chronology
Colin James and the Little Big Band (1993)	Bad Habits (1995)	Then Again... (1995)

Professional ratings
Review scores
Source	Rating
AllMusic	4/5 stars

Bad Habits is a blues album by Canadian musician Colin James, released in 1995. In the U.S., the album was released on Elektra Records. The album was produced, engineered and mixed at Compass Point Studios in Nassau and mastered at MasterDisk in New York City. The album earned James the 1996 Juno Award for Male Vocalist of the Year. The album had sold 70,000 units in Canada by January, 1999.

== Track listing ==
1. "Saviour" (Coyne, Legget, Smith) – 4:40
2. "Freedom" (James, Wilson) – 5:25
3. "Standin' on the Edge" (J.L. Williams) – 3:45
4. "Real Stuff" (James, Burgess, Linden) – 4:19
5. "Better Days" (James, Burgess) – 4:33
6. "I Can't Hold Out" (Willie Dixon) – 4:12
7. "Bad Habits" (Brewer) – 5:15
8. "Forty Four" (Burnett) – 4:31
9. "Walkin' Blues" (Robert Johnson) – 3:25
10. "Atlanta Moan" – 3:11
11. "Speechless" (James) – 4:15

== Personnel ==
- Colin James – vocals, guitars
- Lenny Kravitz – clavinet on "Saviour"
- Mavis Staples – vocals on "Freedom"
- Kim Wilson – harmonica
- Sarah Dash – supporting vocals
- Bobby King – supporting vocals
- Terry Evans – supporting vocals
- Waddy Wachtel – guitar
- James "Hutch" Hutchinson – bass
- Reese Wynans - piano, organ
- Mickey Curry - drums, percussion
- Rene Spooner - percussion
- "Sax" Gordon Beadle, Johnny Ferreira - tenor saxophone
- Doug James - baritone saxophone
- Bob Enos - trumpet
- Jimmie Jamieson - backing vocals

== Certifications ==
Certifications for Bad Habits
Region	Certification	Certified units/sales
Canada (Music Canada)	Gold	50,000^{^}
^{^} Shipments figures based on certification alone.
