= Roomful of Blues =

American jump blues and swing revival big band

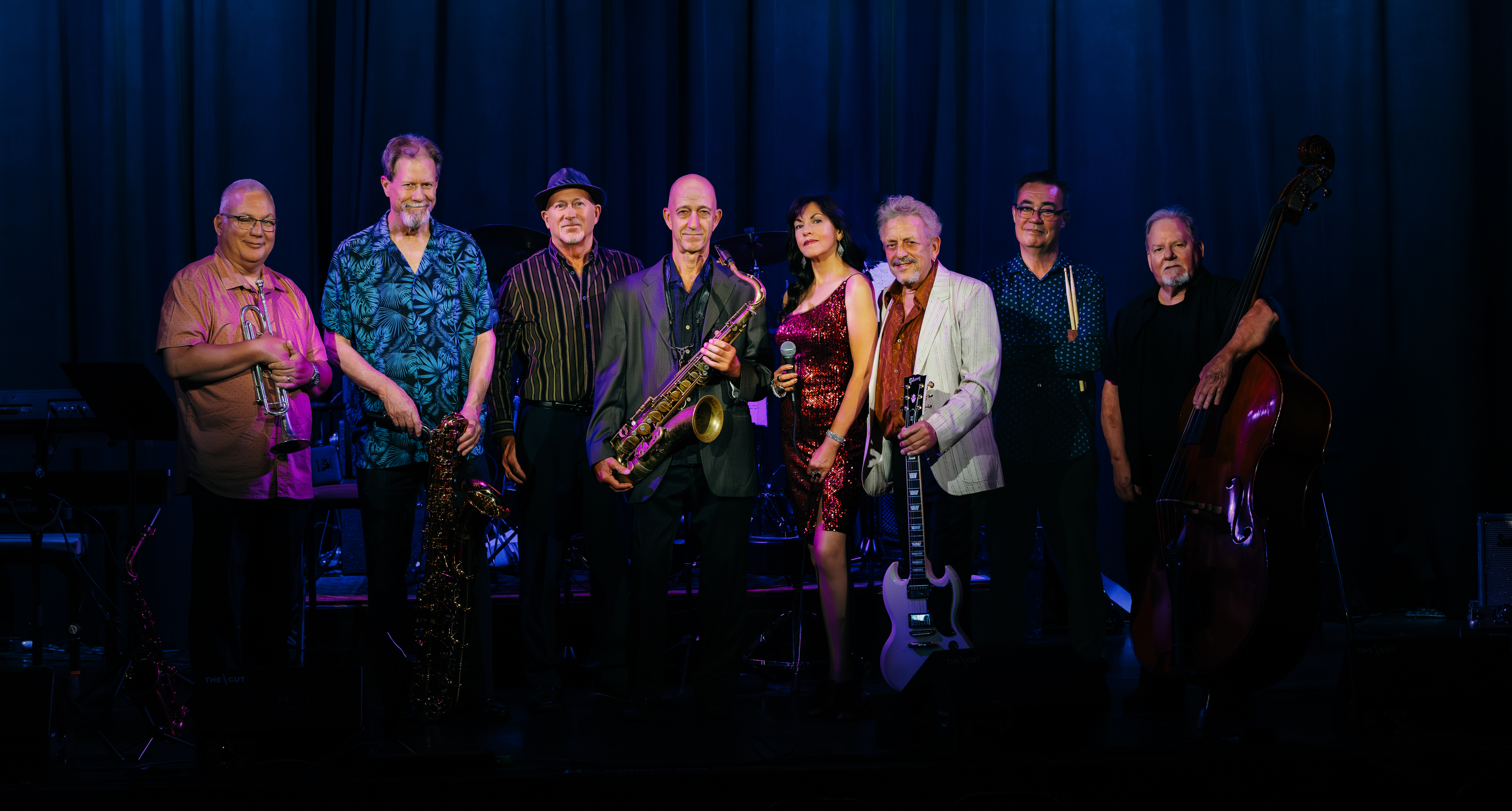

Roomful of Blues is an American jump blues and swing revival big band based in Rhode Island. With a recording career that spans over 50 years, they have toured worldwide and recorded many albums. Roomful of Blues, according to the Chicago Sun-Times, "Swagger, sway and swing with energy and precision". Since 1967, the group’s blend of swing, rock and roll, jump blues, boogie-woogie and soul has earned it five Grammy Award nominations and many other accolades, including seven Blues Music Awards (with a victory as Blues Band Of The Year in 2005). Billboard called the band "a tour de force of horn-fried blues…Roomful is so tight and so right." The Down Beat International Critics Poll has twice selected Roomful of Blues as Best Blues Band.

Roomful of Blues is currently an eight-piece unit led by guitarist Chris Vachon and featuring long-time tenor and alto sax player Rich Lataille. In 2024, singer DD Bastos took over the vocal duties, replacing Phil Pemberton. Recent members are trumpeter Christopher Pratt, bassist Lou Bocciarelli and drummer Mike Coffey, joining on baritone and tenor saxophonist Craig Thomas and keyboardist Jeff Ceasrine. Over the years there have been over 55 Roomful of Blues members.

== History ==
Roomful of Blues was born in Westerly, Rhode Island, United States, in 1967 when guitarist Duke Robillard and pianist Al Copley started a band that played tough, no-holds-barred Chicago blues. They soon began exploring the swinging, jumping blues, R&B and jazz of the 1940s and 1950s, and added a horn section (including Rich Lataille) in 1970. They established a devoted fan base in New England. In 1974, they performed with Count Basie, and a few years later songwriter Doc Pomus helped them land their first record deal, and produced their debut with co-producer Joel Dorn. In 1977, Roomful of Blues’ self-titled debut album on Island Records (reissued on Hyena Records as The First Album) brought them to national attention.

Founding member Duke Robillard left the band in 1980, and guitarist Ronnie Earl replaced him. Singer Lou Ann Barton joined the band at this time, sharing vocals with sax man Greg Piccolo. By now the band was touring nationally, attracting bigger and bigger crowds. Roomful recorded the Hot Little Mama for their own Blue Flame label and two successful albums for the Varrick label during the 1980s. In 1994, they released Dance All Night, their first featuring guitarist Chris Vachon (who joined the band in 1990) and harpist/vocalist Sugar Ray Norcia. Their 1995 album, the Grammy-nominated Turn It On! Turn It Up!, a mix of big band swing and rock and roll, brought the band its greatest radio and sales success to date. 1997 saw a sizable turnover in personnel, with five members departing; vocalist/harpist Sugar Ray Norcia, keyboardist Matt McCabe, bassist "Doc" Grace, baritone saxophonist Doug "Mr. Low" James, and trombonist Carl Querfurth left and were replaced by, respectively, vocalist McKinley "Mac" Odom, keyboardist Al Weisman, bassist Marty Ballou, baritone saxist Kevin May, and trombonist/bass trombonist John Wolf. This edition of Roomful released There Goes the Neighborhood on Rounder subsidiary Bullseye Blues in 1998. Roomful of Blues joined Chicago-based Alligator Records with the Grammy-nominated That’s Right! in 2003, followed by Standing Room Only in 2005, Raisin’ A Ruckus in 2008, Hook, Line and Sinker in 2011 and 45 Live! in 2013. Down Beat described Standing Room Only as “bold, brassy and highly danceable jump blues with contemporary energy and sophistication...swings with a vengeance.”

In addition to their band recordings, Roomful of Blues often backed musicians like Jimmy Witherspoon, Jimmy McCracklin, Roy Brown, Joe Turner, Eddie “Cleanhead” Vinson and Earl King — stars of the 1940s and 1950s jump blues scene. Roomful recorded albums with Turner, Vinson and King during the 1980s, and all three recordings received Grammy nominations. They played with rocker Pat Benatar on her 1991 jump blues album True Love. The Roomful Horns backed many other artists as well, including Canadian star Colin James on his double platinum album (in Canada), Colin James and the Little Big Band, and Stevie Ray Vaughan on his 1984 Live At Carnegie Hall album on Epic.

Over the years Roomful of Blues has played countless gigs and many major festivals, including The San Francisco Blues Festival, The King Biscuit Blues Festival, The Beale Street Music Festival, Blues On The Fox, Illinois Blues Festival, Kansas City Blues Festival, Monterey Blues Festival, Santa Cruz Blues Festival, and overseas at The North Sea Jazz Festival, The Stockholm Jazz Festival, The Montreux Jazz Festival, Notodden Festival and the Belgian Rhythm & Blues Festival. They have gigged with blues stars ranging from B.B. King, Otis Rush and Stevie Ray Vaughan to rockers Eric Clapton and Carlos Santana. The band has toured virtually non-stop, hitting cities from coast to coast, and traveling abroad to Spain, Italy, France, Portugal, Switzerland, Turkey and Russia.

== Personnel ==
Throughout four decades of continuous touring and recording, the band's line-up has experienced many changes. It is said that more than 50 musicians have played in the band. Some of them have achieved a successful solo career. Of note, Porky Cohen, whose career began in the 1940s and included playing in the bands of Charlie Barnet, Artie Shaw, Lucky Millinder, Tommy Dorsey and others, was in the band. Rich Lataille, alto and tenor saxophone, is the only remaining member from the original line-up.

Bassist Rory MacLeod died on December 6, 2025, after being hit by a car while he was walking his dogs. He was 70.

=== Current members ===
- Rich Lataille – tenor and alto saxophone (1970–present)
- Chris Vachon – guitar (1990–present)
- D.D. Bastos – vocal (2024–present)
- Jeff Ceasrine – piano and Hammond organ (2024–present)
- Lou Bocciarelli – upright bass and bass guitar
- Mike Coffey – drums
- Christopher Pratt – trumpet
- Craig Thomas– baritone and tenor saxophone

=== Former members ===
Listed alphabetically. This is a partial list.

- Chris Anzalone – drums (2020)
- Phil Pemberton - vocals (2009-2024)
- Marty Ballou – bass
- Lou Ann Barton – vocal (early 1980s)
- Al Basile – trumpet and cornet
- Junior Brantley – keyboards
- Fran Christina – drums
- Porky Cohen – trombone (deceased)
- Travis Colby – piano and Hammond organ (20??–2012)
- Al Copley – piano (1967–1984)
- Jason Corbiere – drums
- Forest Doran - bass (two stints)
- Mark DuFresne – vocal and harmonica
- Keith Dunn - vocals (1984)
- Ronnie Earl – guitar (1980–1988)
- Mark Earley – baritone sax and tenor sax
- Bob Enos – trumpet (deceased)
- Dimitri Gorodestky – bass
- Ken "Doc" Grace – bass
- Brad Hallen – bass
- Dave Howard – vocal (20??–2010)
- Preston Hubbard – bass (deceased)
- Fred Jackson – trumpet
- Doug "Mr. Low" James – baritone saxophone
- Tommy K. – guitar
- Ron Levy – piano and Hammond organ (1983–1987)
- Ephraim Lowell – drums
- Kevin May – baritone sax
- Matt McCabe – piano
- Rory MacLeod – bass (1985–1987; died 2025)
- Danny Motta – trumpet
- Sugar Ray Norcia – vocal and harmonica (1991–1998)
- Mac Odom – vocal
- Edward Parnigoni, Jr. – bass
- Larry Peduzzi – bass
- Greg Piccolo – vocal and tenor sax
- Carl Querfurth – trombone and producer
- Bryan "Frankie" Rizzuto – upright bass, electric bass
- Duke Robillard – vocal and guitar (1967–1980)
- John Rossi – drums (1970–1998; died April 2022)
- Curtis Salgado – vocal (1984–1986)
- Mark Stevens – piano and Hammond organ
- Paul Tomasello – bass and vocal
- Hank Walther – piano and Hammond organ
- Mike Warner – drums
- Albert Weisman – piano and Hammond organ
- Jimmy Wimpfheimer – bass
- John Wolf – trombone and bass trombone
- Doug Woolverton – trumpet

== Discography ==
=== Studio albums ===
- 1977 Roomful of Blues [reissued as The First Album] (Island; Varrick/Rounder [1988]; 32 Records [1996]; Hyena [2003])
- 1979 Let's Have a Party (Antilles; Roomtone RT-102 [2004])
- 1981 Hot Little Mama! (Blue Flame BLUF-1001; Ace; Varrick/Rounder [1985])
- 1982 Eddie "Cleanhead" Vinson & Roomful of Blues (by Eddie "Cleanhead" Vinson) (Muse)
- 1983 Blues Train (by Big Joe Turner) (Muse; Rockbeat) - with special guest: Dr. John.
- 1984 Dressed Up To Get Messed Up (Varrick/Rounder; Demon)
- 1986 Glazed (by Earl King) (Black Top; Demon)
- 1991 True Love (by Pat Benatar) (Chrysalis) - Ms. Benatar's jump blues album featuring 'The Roomful Horns' with her band: Neil Giraldo, Chuck Domanico, Myron Grombacher, Charlie Giordano.
- 1994 Dance All Night (Bullseye Blues/Rounder)
- 1995 Turn It On! Turn It Up! (Bullseye Blues/Rounder)
- 1996 Rhythm & Bones (by Porky Cohen) (Bullseye Blues/Rounder)
- 1997 Under One Roof (Bullseye Blues/Rounder)
- 1997 Roomful of Christmas (Bullseye Blues/Rounder)
- 1998 There Goes the Neighborhood (Bullseye Blues/Rounder)
- 2001 Watch You When You Go (Bullseye Blues/Rounder)
- 2003 That's Right! (Alligator)
- 2005 Standing Room Only (Alligator)
- 2008 Raisin' a Ruckus (Alligator)
- 2011 Hook, Line & Sinker (Alligator)
- 2020 In a Roomful of Blues (Alligator)
- 2025 Steppin' Out! (Alligator)

=== Live albums ===
- 1987 Live at Lupo's Heartbreak Hotel (Varrick/Rounder; Demon)
- 2002 Live at Wolf Trap (Roomtone RT-101 [limited edition, currently out-of-print])
- 2013 45 Live! (Alligator) - recorded live at 'The Ocean Mist'.

=== Compilation albums ===
- 1999 Swingin' & Jumpin' (1979–1983 recordings) (32 Records)
- 2000 The Blues'll Make You Happy Too (1981–1998 recordings) (Rounder)
- 2009 Essential Recordings: Jump Blues Classics (Perfect 10 Series: Best of Rounder Records) (Rounder)
