= Plays More Blues, Ballads & Favorites =

Studio album by Jimmie Vaughan
- Released: 2011
- Genre: Blues
- Label: Shout! Factory, Proper Records

Jimmie Vaughan chronology
Plays Blues, Ballads & Favorites (2010)	Plays More Blues, Ballads & Favorites (2011)

Plays More Blues, Ballads & Favorites is a 2011 release by Texas blues guitarist/singer Jimmie Vaughan. It was released by Shout! Factory and Proper Records. It was his second consecutive album featuring only cover songs, the follow-up to his 2010 album Plays Blues, Ballads & Favorites.

== Personnel ==
Vaughan plays guitar on all tracks and sings on all, except the instrumental "Greenbacks". Lou Ann Barton duets with Vaughan on "No Use Knocking", "Breaking Up Is Hard to Do" and "I'm in the Mood for You".

- George Rains - drums
- Ronnie James - bass
- Greg Piccolo - tenor saxophone
- Doug James - baritone saxophone

Billy Pitman plays rhythm guitar on all tracks, except "Breaking Up Is Hard to Do" which features Derek O'Brien on rhythm guitar.

The album was produced by Jimmie Vaughan.

== Track listing ==
The information below applies to Shout! Factory CD #826663-12722. The Proper Records release - a double album (#PRP LP 083), and the CD (#PRPCD083), both include 2 extra songs, "Bad Bad Whiskey" and "Shake a Hand"

Track	Song title	Song length	Original performer	Songwriter(s)	Original release Date	Notes
1	I Ain't Never	3:05	Mel Tillis & The Statesiders	Mel Tillis, Webb Pierce	1972	-
2	No Use Knocking	3:28	Bobby Charles	Robert Guidry, Paul Gayten	1956	-
3	Teardrop Blues	4:48	Jimmy Liggins & His Drops Of Joy	Jimmy Liggins	1948	-
4	I Hang My Head And Cry	3:42	Gene Autry	Gene Autry, Fred Rose, Ray Whitley	1941	also by Hank Williams
5	It's Been A Long Time	3:34	Annie Laurie	Howard Biggs, Joe Thomas	1953	-
6	Breaking Up Is Hard To Do	2:46	Jivin' Gene & The Jokers	Gene Bourgeois, Huey Purvis Meaux	1959	NOT the Neil Sedaka song
7	What Makes You So Tough	3:39	Teddy Humphries	Henry Glover	1959	-
8	Greenbacks	2:12	Ray Charles	Renald Richards	1955	-
9	I'm In The Mood For You	2:22	Annie Laurie	Howard Biggs, Joe Thomas	1954	-
10	I Ain't Gonna Do It No More	3:50	Bobby Charles	Robert Guidry	1957	AKA "No More (I Ain't Gonna Love You No More)"
11	Cried Like A Baby	3:55	Nappy Brown	Nappy Brown, Lew Herman, P. David	1959	also by Koko Taylor
12	Oh Oh Oh	4:00	Lloyd Price	Lloyd Price	1952	AKA "Oh, Oh, Oh" (1957)
13	I'm A Love You	2:49	Jimmy Reed	Jimmy Reed	1961	-
14	The Rains Came	2:53	Big Sambo & The House Wreckers	Huey Purvis Meaux	1962	also by Freddie Fender, and Sir Douglas Quintet

== Sources ==
- "Singles Discography for OKeh Records". Globaldogproductions.info.
- "Photographic image of album sleeve" (JPG). Tunnel.ru.
- "Jimmie Vaughan: Plays More Blues, Ballads and Favorites". PopMatters.com.
