= Fusor (disambiguation) =

Fusor or Fuzor may refer to:

Fusor

- Fusor or the Farnsworth–Hirsch Fusor, an apparatus designed by Philo T. Farnsworth to create nuclear fusion
- Fusor (astronomy), an object that achieves core fusion during its lifetime

Fuzor

- Fuzors, a Transformers sub-line (toys, comics and cartoons)
- Zoids Fuzors, an anime

== See also ==
- Fuser (disambiguation)
- Fuzer
