= The Gothenburg Address =

Scottish post-rock band

- Origin: Edinburgh, Scotland
- Genres: Instrumental, Shoegaze, Post rock
- Years active: 2008 – Present
- Labels: I Messiah Records
- Members: Luke G Joyce - guitar (2008-present); Al Conway - Guitar (2013-present); Robert Percival - drums (2013-present); Gavin Cormack - bass (2013-present)
- Past members: Rob Doig - bass (2008-10); Chris Bathgate - guitar (2008-10); David Jeans - drums (2008-10)
- Website: The Gothenburg Address official site

The Gothenburg Address is a Scottish, Edinburgh-based post-rock band.

== History ==
The Gothenburg Address was formed in Edinburgh in 2008 by guitarist Luke Joyce, formerly of Raising Miss June. Its earliest lineup consisted of Chris Bathgate (Arab Strap), David Jeans (Arab Strap, The Zephyrs) and bassist Rob Doig (The Fuse). Playing a series of low key shows around Glasgow and Edinburgh, the band quickly built up a following, culminating in them playing the main stage at George Square, Glasgow at the Winterfest Festival to an audience of several thousand people. This early success was reflected in their being named XFM band of the week, and crowned 'Unsigned Heroes' by Radio 1, on the basis of some rough demo material, which was released as a limited self pressed EP 'Shimmer in the City'.

The band were described by The Scotsman as "...purely instrumental, conveying a late night/early dawn atmosphere through chilly guitars and understated harmonies."

The Gothenburg Address were asked along with fellow Scottish Post-Rock band Mogwai to soundtrack the short film Sonnets from Scotland by photographer Alex Boyd. Boyd would also later go on to provide the artwork for their debut EP, which uses his trademark 'Rückenfigur' style. He has described the band's sound as "...dark, brooding, glacial, majestic and intelligent."

In 2009, The Gothenburg Address recorded a single, "Lesser Coming Home", followed by their debut self-titled album.

Bathgate, Doig and Jeans left the band in 2010 and were subsequently replaced by David Ritchie, Robert Percival and Christian Kimmett. In 2011, the band released a single "The Hessian". Since the release of The Sky. The Mountains. The Land., The Gothenburg Address saw the departure of Christian Kimmet and David Ritchie. The band are now currently working on new material and have welcomed Gavin Cormack on Bass and Al Conway on guitar.

== Discography ==
=== Albums ===
- The Sky. The Mountains. The Land (2013)
- Demos - 2007 - 2009 (2012)
- self titled (2009, I Messiah)

=== EPs ===
- The Hessian (2011)
- Lesser Coming Home (2009, I Messiah)
- Shimmer In the City EP (2008, I Messiah)

=== Compilations ===
- From the Cabaret Voltaire (2008, Cab Voltaire) song: "Through Haze and Wrench"

=== Film soundtracks ===
- Sonnets from Scotland (2009, I Messiah) song: "The Modern Dilemma"
