= Colin James and the Little Big Band =

Studio album by Colin James
- Released: 1993
- Genre: Jump blues, swing revival
- Length: 46:51
- Label: Virgin
- Producer: Chris Kimsey

Colin James chronology
Sudden Stop (1990)	Colin James and the Little Big Band (1993)	Bad Habits (1995)

Professional ratings
Review scores
Source	Rating
AllMusic	3/5 stars

Colin James and the Little Big Band is a jump blues album by Canadian musician Colin James, released in 1993, featuring members of Roomful of Blues. The album had sold 220,000 units in Canada by January 1999.

== Track listing ==
1. "Cadillac Baby" (Brown) – 3:12
2. "That's What You Do to Me" (Carl Querfurth - instrumental) – 3:27
3. "Sit Right Here" (Rosco Gordon) – 2:45
4. "Three Hours Past Midnight" (Watson, Sam Ling) – 6:07
5. "Satellite" (Burgess, Colin James, Tonio K.) – 4:12
6. "Surely (I Love You)" (James, C. Bracken, Mickey Oliver) – 3:40
7. "Breakin' Up the House" (Glover, Mann) – 3:04
8. "No More Doggin'" (Rosco Gordon, Jules Taub) – 3:09
9. "Evening" (Parish, White) – 5:02
10. "Train Kept A-Rollin'" (Tiny Bradshaw, Kay, Mann) – 2:46
11. "Leading Me On" (Ike Turner) – 2:18
12. "The Boogie Twist Part II" (Cox, Valentine) – 4:58
13. "Cha Shooky Doo" (Vince) – 2:12

== Personnel ==
- Colin James - vocals, guitars
- Johnny Ferreira - tenor saxophone
- Rich Lataille - alto saxophone
- Bob Enos - trumpet
- Chuck Leavell - organ, piano
- Reese Wynans - piano
- Norm Fisher - bass
- John "The Fly" Rossi - drums
- Doug James - baritone saxophone
- Carl Querfurth - trombone
- Roomful of Blues - horn section
- Rhode Island Boys Choir - background vocals

== Certifications ==
Certifications for Colin James and the Little Big Band
Region	Certification	Certified units/sales
Canada (Music Canada)	2× Platinum	200,000^{^}
^{^} Shipments figures based on certification alone.
