= Fuse (emulator) =

- Developer: Fuse Team
- Stable release: 1.8.0 / May 11, 2026; 5 days ago
- Written in: C
- Operating system: FreeBSD, GP2X, macOS, Linux, Windows, AmigaOS, MorphOS
- Type: Emulator
- License: GPL
- Website: fuse-emulator.sourceforge.net
- Repository: git.code.sf.net/p/fuse-emulator/fuse

The Free Unix Spectrum Emulator (Fuse) is an emulator of the 1980s ZX Spectrum home computer and its various clones for Unix, Windows and macOS. Fuse is free software, released under the GNU General Public License. There are ports of Fuse to several platforms including GP2X, PlayStation 3, PlayStation Portable, Wii, the Nokia N810, and Android (as the Spectacol project).

The project was started in 1999 and is still under development as of 2026. It has been recognised as one of the most full-featured and accurate Spectrum emulators available for Linux, and portions of its code have been ported and adapted for use in other free software projects such as the Sprinter emulator SPRINT and the ZX81 emulator EightyOne.
