= Gerry Beaudoin =

American jazz guitarist

- Born: August 6, 1954 (age 70); Waltham, Massachusetts, U.S.
- Genres: Jazz, swing, blues
- Occupation(s): Musician, composer
- Instrument: Guitar
- Years active: 1969–present
- Labels: North Star, Francesca, Arbors

Gerry Beaudoin (born August 6, 1954) is an American jazz guitarist and former member of the New Guitar Summit with Jay Geils and Duke Robillard.

== Career ==
Beaudoin's father listened to Louis Armstrong, Count Basie, Andrés Segovia, and country music. Inspired by Chet Atkins and Johnny Cash, Beaudoin started playing guitar around the time he was ten-years-old. When he was fifteen, he began playing professionally with a country band. During the rest of high school, he played in blues bands, rock bands, and an Italian wedding band.

In 1972, he went to the Berklee College of Music in Boston. While visiting his sister in New York City, he saw performances by jazz guitarists Kenny Burrell, Jim Hall, Joe Puma, and Chuck Wayne. One night, he saw Bucky Pizzarelli and was motivated to buy a seven-string guitar. Pizzarelli became a lifelong friend and mentor.

Beaudoin has had the good fortune to work with two guitarists he admired when he was younger which turned into the high profile concert attraction " New Guitar Summit". In high school, Beaudoin had seen a concert by blues guitarist Duke Robillar and Roomful of Blues. It had a huge impact on him and to this day he still cites Roomful of Blues as his favorite band. Duke has also been a huge influence and Duke's recording with Scott Hamilton's group "Swing"set up the two like minded guitarists to collaborate on gigs and recordings through the years after their initial meeting in 1984. In the 1980's Gerry also was tapped to play with jazz luminaries like blues shouter and jazz saxophonist Eddie " Cleanhead " Vinson and jazz icon, pianist Jay McShann. In high school, he was given the J. Geils Band's first album, which he tried to work out on guitar. In 1992, he met Jay Geils, who said he owned some of Beaudoin's albums. Years later, Beaudoin, Robillard, and Geils formed the New Guitar Summit, a swing trio with roots in the music of Charlie Christian and Benny Goodman. Their second album, Jazzthing II, featured guest performances by Randy Bachman.

== Discography ==
- "In A Sentimental Mood" Gerry Beaudoin and the Boston Jazz Ensemble (North Star 1990)
- Minor Swing The Gerry Beaudoin Trio with David Grisman Duke Robillard (North Star, 1992)
- A Sentimental Christmas Gerry Beaudoin and the Boston Jazz Ensemble (North Star, 1994)
- Sentimental Over You Gerry Beaudoin and the Boston Jazz Ensemble (North Star, 1994)
- " Live At The Rendezvous" The Gerry Beaudoin Trio (Francesca Records, 1995)
- Just Among Friends The Gerry Beaudoin Trio featuring David Grisman Bucky Pizzarelli (Honest, Entertainment 1998)
- New Guitar Summit with Jay Geils and Duke Robillard (Stony Plain, 2004)
- Jay Geils, Gerry Beaudoin, and the Kings of Strings Featuring Aaron Weinstein (Arbors, 2006)
- New Guitar Summit: Shivers with Jay Geils and Duke Robillard (Stony Plain, 2008)
- The Gerry Beaudoin Trio featuring Harry Allen The Return (Francesca, 2011)

=== As guest ===
- I Like It When It Rains, Ronnie Earl (1990)
- B-3 Blues and Grooves, Ron Levy (1992)
- Jazzthing II, Randy Bachman (2007)
- Jay Geils Plays Jazz, Jay Geils (Stony Plain, 2005)
- Toe Tappin' Jazz, Jay Geils (North Star, 2009)
- Saturday Night At Main Street, Gerry Beaudoin-Teddy Lavash (Francesca Records)
