= Fuser =

Fuser may refer to:

- fuser (Unix), a Unix command which lists processes currently using given files, filesystems, or sockets
- Fuser (video game), a rhythm video game
- Fuser, the part of a laser printer that melts the toner onto the medium

== People ==
- Diego Fuser (born 1968), Italian footballer
- Marco Fuser (born 1991), Italian rugby player
- Fuser, a nickname for Che Guevara

== See also ==
- Fusee (disambiguation)
- Fusor (disambiguation)
- Füzér, Borsod-Abaúj-Zemplén, Hungary
