= Colin James and the Little Big Band II =

Studio album by Colin James
- Released: 1998
- Recorded: 1998
- Genres: Jump blues; swing revival
- Length: 47:39
- Label: Warner
- Producers: Joe Hardy; Colin James; Craig Northey

Colin James chronology
National Steel (1997)	Colin James and the Little Big Band II (1998)	Fuse (2000)

Professional ratings
Review scores
Source	Rating
AllMusic	3/5 stars

Colin James and the Little Big Band II is a swing-jive album by Canadian musician Colin James, released in 1998. Colin James and the Little Big Band II earned James the 1999 Juno Award for Best Producer. The album was certified Platinum in Canada.

== Track listing ==
1. "Jumpin' from Six to Six" – 2:54
2. "Safronia B" – 2:15
3. "Mary Anne" – 3:34
4. "Let's Shout (Baby Work Out)" – 3:12
5. "You Know My Love" – 3:27
6. "I'll See It Through" – 3:46
7. "C'mon with the C'mon" – 2:57
8. "Rocket to the Moon" – 3:42
9. "Think" – 3:52
10. "Somethin's Goin' On in My Room" – 2:35
11. "I'm Lost Without You" – 3:04
12. "Tin Pan Alley" – 4:27
13. "Triple Shot" – 3:59
14. "Bring It On Home" – 3:55

== Personnel ==
- Colin James - vocals, guitars
- Greg Piccolo - tenor and alto saxophones
- Kaz Kazanoff - baritone and tenor saxophones
- Brian Casserly - trumpet, vocals
- John Wolf - trombone, bass trombone, vocals
- Reese Wynans - Hammond organ, piano
- George Rains - drums
- Norm Fisher - stand-up bass, electric bass, vocals
- Eric Webster - Hammond organ, piano, vocals (tracks 3, 8, 10, and 14)
- Al Webster - drums, vocals (tracks 3, 8, 10, and 14)

== Certifications ==
Certifications for Little Big Band II
Region	Certification	Certified units/sales
Canada (Music Canada)	Platinum	100,000^{^}
^{^} Shipments figures based on certification alone.
