= Fuse (club) =

Nightclub in Brussels, Belgium

Coordinates: 50°50′07″N 4°20′41″E

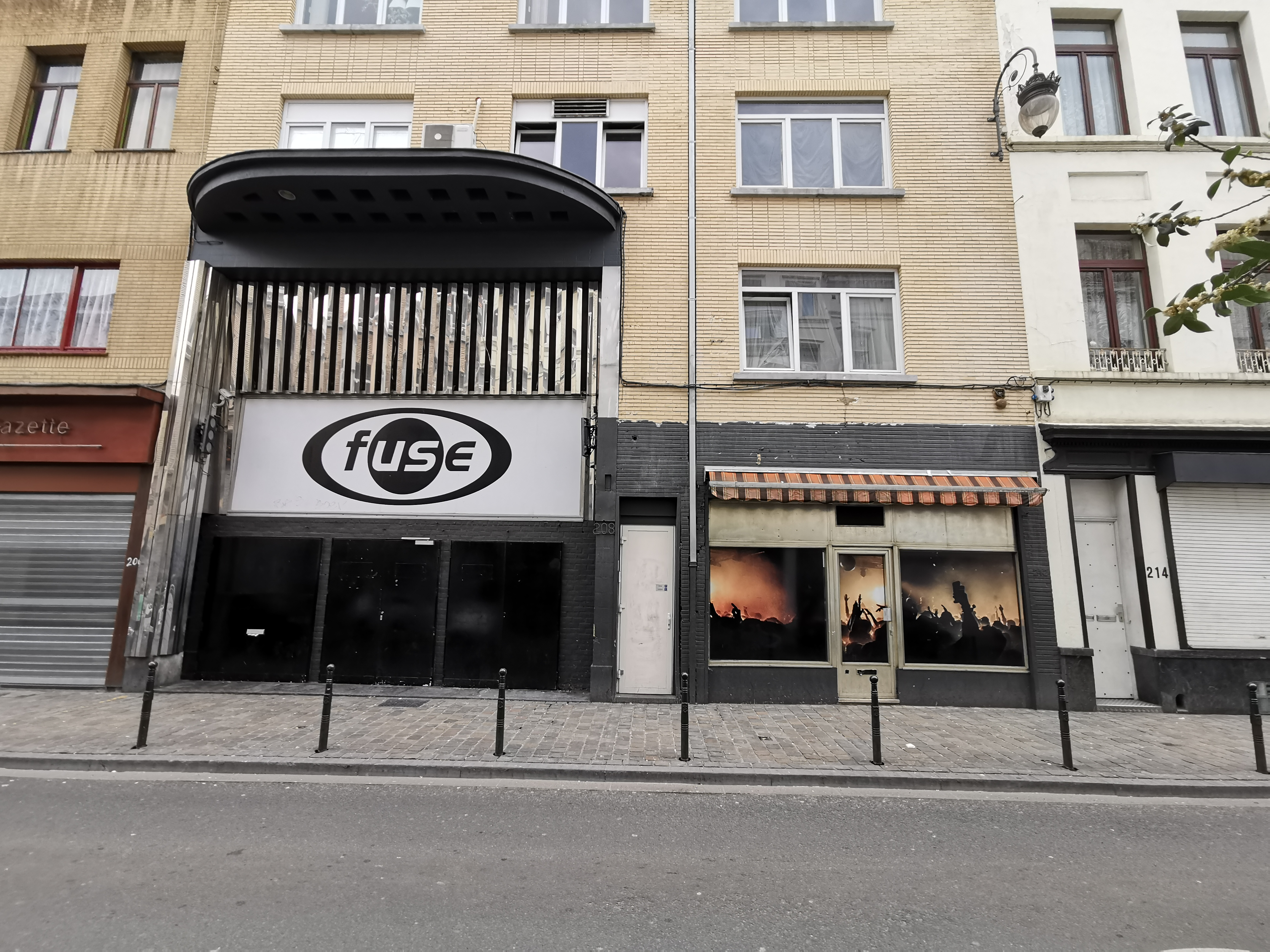
Front entrance of the club on the Rue Blaes/Blaesstraat in Brussels

Fuse is a nightclub in the Marolles/Marollen district of Brussels, Belgium. It opened in 1994 and has a capacity of approximately 1,500 people.

== Location ==
The location initially housed a neighborhood cinema that changed its name several times: Cinema Blaes (1925–1933), Cinema Iris (1934–1940) and finally Cinema R.A.F. (1947–71). Later, Le Disque Rouge opened there, a club popular with the Spanish community in Brussels. Thierry Coppens and Peter Decuypere took over this club and turned it into Fuse in 1994.

== DJs and notable acts ==
Coppens had organized the gay party La Demence since 1989, which has taken place in Fuse ever since. Together with Decuypere, he saw a good future for techno, and together, they brought Fuse to prominence among international techno clubs. It has been named the best club in Belgium, and its resident DJ Pierre (not to be confused with DJ Pierre) was named the best Belgian resident DJ by the entertainment magazine Nightcode. Acts such as Daft Punk, Aphex Twin and Björk have played at Fuse throughout the years.

Decuypere left Fuse in 1997 to focus on his I Love Techno event in Ghent. At the end of 2007, Coppens handed Fuse management over to his friends Nick Ramoudt and Dominique Martens to focus entirely on La Demence. At the beginning of 2020, Steven Van Belle and Andy Walravens took over the club's management.

== Recognition ==
Fuse was on DJ Magazine's list of the 100 best clubs in the world between 2008 and 2014, placing highest in 2010 at position 21. That year, the magazine said: "As explosive as its name suggests, Fuse has been Belgium's number one techno outpost since it opened way back in 1994 - an era when Belgian techno label R&S was revered as one of the globe's most influential and innovative record labels."

== 2023 temporary closure ==
On 12 January 2023, Fuse decided to close its doors after the Brussels Environment Public Service ordered them to reduce the noise level to 95dB and to close at 2 a.m., following complaints from a neighbor. Fuse appealed the decision, which was accepted, and the club could open again without restrictions.
