= Füzes =

Füzes or Fuzes may refer to:

== People ==
- Peter Fuzes (born 1947), Australian soccer player

== Places ==
The Hungarian name for two villages in Romania:

- Fiziş, a village in Finiș Commune, Bihor County
- Stupini, a village in Hida Commune, Sălaj County

== See also ==
- Fuze, in military munitions, the part of the device that initiates function
