= National Steel (album) =

Studio album by Colin James
- Released: 8 October 1997
- Recorded: 1997
- Genre: Blues
- Length: 50:41
- Label: Warner
- Producer: Colin James, Colin Linden

Colin James chronology
Then Again... (1995)	National Steel (1997)	Colin James and the Little Big Band II (1999)

Professional ratings
Review scores
Source	Rating
AllMusic	link

National Steel is a blues album by Canadian musician Colin James, released in 1997. The album was recorded at Rat's Ass Studios and Mushroom Studios in Vancouver, British Columbia, and mastered at MasterDisk in New York City.

James teamed up with his longtime friend Colin Linden to record a predominantly acoustic album running the gamut from delta blues, to jug band and Chicago blues. The album covers songs written by some of the greatest bluesmen including Otis Redding, Robert Johnson, Muddy Waters, and Willie Dixon.

The album is titled after the resonator guitar made by the National guitar company, also pictured on the album's cover.

National Steel earned James the 1998 Juno Award for Best Blues Album.

== Track listing ==
1. "Shout Baby Shout" (Yank Rachell) – 3:15
2. "Rollin' Stone" (Muddy Waters) – 3:21
3. "National Steel" (Colin James, Daryl Burgess, Christopher Ward) – 4:52
4. "These Arms of Mine" (Otis Redding) – 4:44
5. "Going Up to the Country" (Taj Mahal) – 4:11
6. "Fixin' to Die" (Bukka White) – 4:28
7. "Somebody Have Mercy" (Sam Cooke) – 3:32
8. "Postman's Sack" (Tiny Bradshaw) – 1:40
9. "Please Baby" (Lonnie Chatmon) – 3:41
10. "Ride & Roll" (Brownie McGhee) – 2:39
11. "I Live the Life I Love" (Willie Dixon) – 3:39
12. "My Mind Is On Vacation" (Mose Allison) – 3:34
13. "Before the Dawn" (Colin Linden) – 4:24
14. "Kind-Hearted Woman" (Robert Johnson) – 2:41

== Personnel ==
- Colin James – vocals, guitars
- Colin Linden – acoustic and slide guitars, mandolin, background vocals
- Norm Fisher – bass
- Chris "The Wrist" Norquist – drums and percussion
- Johnny Ferreira – tenor saxophone
- Campbell Ryga – alto saxophone
- James O'Mara – design, photography
