= Fuse (band) =

American rock band (1967–1973)

- Origin: Rockford, Illinois, United States
- Genres: Hard rock, psychedelic rock
- Years active: 1967–1973
- Labels: Smack, Epic
- Spinoffs: Cheap Trick; Silver Fox
- Spinoff of: The Grim Reapers; Toast and Jam
- Past members: Rick Nielsen; Joe Sundberg; Tom Petersson; Craig Myers; Chip Greenman; Thom Mooney; Robert "Stewkey" Antoni; Bun E. Carlos

Fuse was an American rock band formed in Rockford, Illinois, in 1967, after Rick Nielsen proposed the merging of two local bands: The Grim Reapers and Toast and Jam. Managed by Ken Adamany, Fuse's line-up consisted of Rick Nielsen (keyboards/guitar), Joe Sundberg (vocals), Tom Petersson (bass guitar), Craig Myers (lead guitar), and Chip Greenman (drums/percussion). Members of the band later formed Cheap Trick.

== History ==
=== Early years and touring ===
The group formed in Rockford, Illinois, in 1967, after Rick Nielsen proposed the merging of two local bands: The Grim Reapers (Rick Nielsen and Joe Sundberg) and Toast and Jam (Chip Greenman, Craig Myers, and Tom Peterson later known as Tom Petersson). Managed by Ken Adamany, Fuse's line-up consisted of Rick Nielsen (keyboards/guitar), Joe Sundberg (vocals), Tom Peterson (bass guitar), Craig Myers (lead guitar), and Chip Greenman (drums/percussion).

A single was recorded for Smack Records, including the tunes "Hound Dog" and "Crusin for Burgers". In 1968, the band played in Chicago and was signed by Epic Records. Epic executives rushed the band into Columbia Studios in the fall and, in a matter of a few weeks, the album Fuse was recorded, which was released in early 1970 (re-released in 2001).

=== 1970: Fuse LP ===
Recorded with producer Jackie Mills in late 1968, the album was not as successful as the band or label had hoped. According to Richie Unterberger of Allmusic, "The album is an average, perhaps somewhat below average, late-'60s hard rock recording. It looks forward to some facets of '70s metal and art rock in its overwrought vocals, tandem hard rock guitar riffs, and classical-influenced keyboards."

Nielsen has nothing good to say about the Fuse album, stating "Tom Petersson and I were in a Midwest band called Fuse. The guys we were with were all rinky dinks; they’re probably pumping gas now. Tom and I had the stick-to-it-iveness and positive thinking to know what we wanted to do, so we split the band and went off to hang out in England.... That Fuse stuff stinks. We don’t stand by it." By Petersson’s account, "The band was much better than the album indicates. When it came out we were disgusted. The producer was an idiot."

=== Final years ===
Frustrated by their lack of success, Fuse recruited the two remaining members of Nazz (Thom Mooney and Robert "Stewkey" Antoni) in 1970 in place of Sundberg and Greenman, and ended up playing around the Midwest for 6 or 7 months under two monikers, Fuse or Nazz, depending on where they were gigging. With Brad Carlson, later known as Bun E. Carlos, replacing Mooney on drums, Fuse moved to Philadelphia in 1971 and began calling themselves 'Sick Man of Europe'. After a European tour in 1973, Nielsen, Petersson and Carlos formed Cheap Trick with Randy Hogan.

== Members ==
- Rick Nielsen (Guitar, Keyboards)
- Tom Petersson (Bass)
- Joe Sundberg (Vocals)
- Chip Greenman (Drums)
- Craig Myers (Guitar)

== Discography ==
=== Albums ===
- 1970: Fuse
