= Just Came Back =

Single by Colin James

from the album Sudden Stop
- Released: 1990
- Genre: Rock, blues rock
- Length: 4:59
- Label: Virgin
- Songwriters: Colin James, Daryl Burgess
- Producer: Joe Hardy

Colin James singles chronology
"Back in My Arms Again" (1989)	"Just Came Back" (1990)	"Keep On Loving Me Baby" (1990)

"Just Came Back" is a song by Canadian musician Colin James. The song was released as the lead single from his second studio album, Sudden Stop. The song peaked at #5 on the Canadian RPM Singles chart, and is James' biggest hit to date. The song was the fourth-most played Cancon song in Canada of 1990. In 1991, the song won the Juno Award for Single of the Year.

== Charts ==
=== Weekly charts ===
Chart (1990)	Peak position
Australia (ARIA Charts)	125
Canadian RPM Singles Chart	5
U.S. Billboard Mainstream Rock Tracks	7

=== Year-end charts ===
Chart (1990)	Position
Canada Top Singles (RPM)	52
