= Debbie Davies =

American guitarist (born 1952)

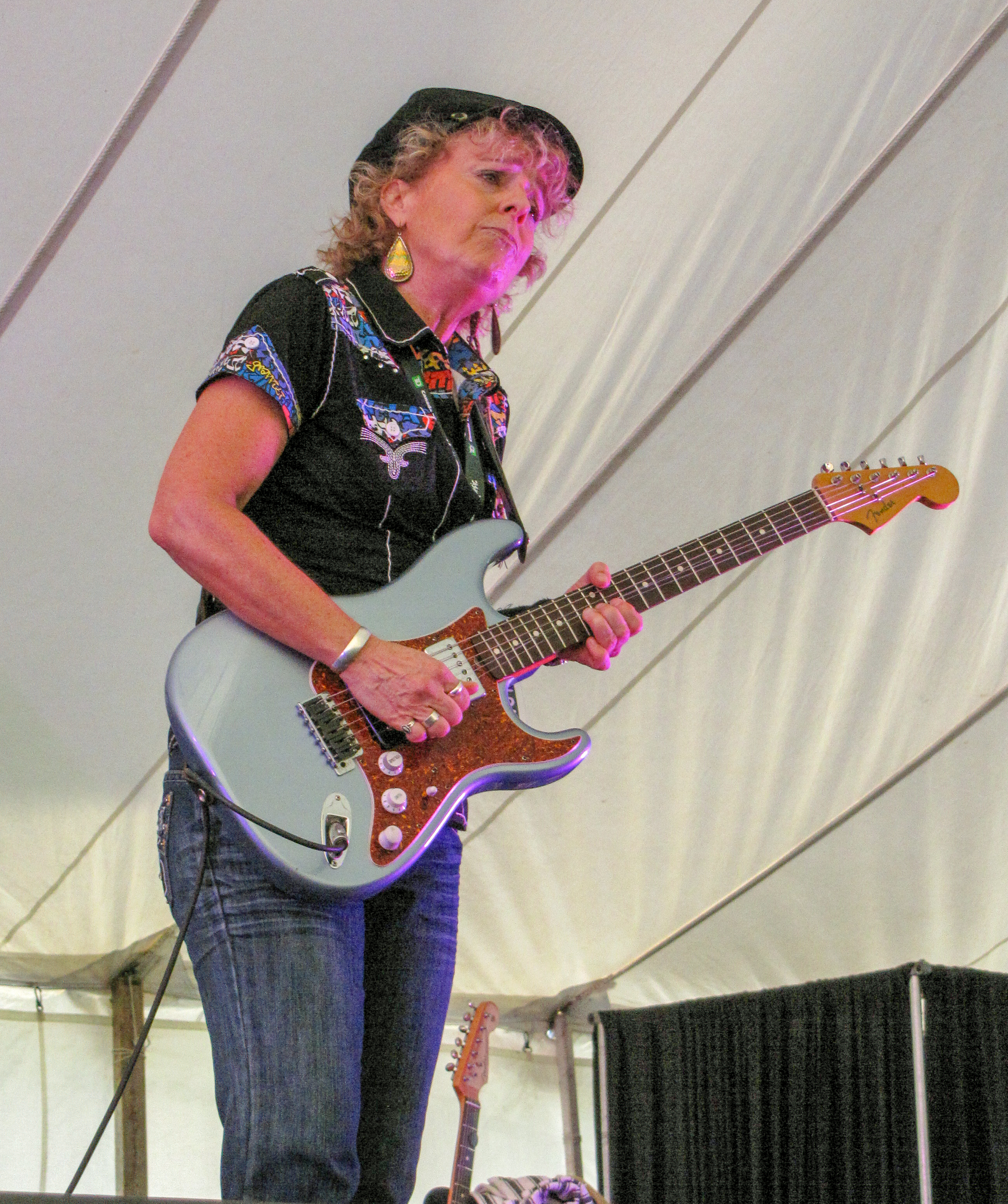
- Davies performing at the Kitchener Blues Festival in 2010

Background information
- Born: August 22, 1952 (age 74); Los Angeles, California, United States
- Instrument: Guitar
- Website: www.debbiedavies.com

Debbie Davies (born August 22, 1952) is an American blues guitarist.

Davies was born in Los Angeles, California, United States. She has been the featured guitarist in several female based bands including Maggie Mayall and the Cadillacs (led by John Mayall's wife), and Fingers Taylor and the Ladyfinger Revue (who opened for Jimmy Buffett during his 1991 tour). Besides her solo work, Davies is best known for her work with Albert Collins as a member of his band, the Icebreakers, from 1988 to 1991. Over the years she has collaborated with several well-known musicians such as Tommy Shannon and Chris Layton (aka Double Trouble), Coco Montoya, J. Geils and Duke Robillard. She continues to record and tour.

== Awards ==
Davies won the 1997 W. C. Handy Award for Best Contemporary Female Artist. and the 2010 Blues Music Award for Best Traditional Female Artist.

== Discography ==
=== Albums ===
- 1993 - Picture This
- 1994 - Loose Tonight
- 1997 - I Got That Feeling
- 1998 - Round Every Corner
- 1998 - Grand Union
- 1999 - Homesick for the Road
- 1999 - Tales from the Austin Motel
- 2001 - Love The Game
- 2003 - Key To Love
- 2005 - All I Found
- 2007 - Blues Blast
- 2009 - Holdin' Court
- 2012 - After The Fall
- 2015 - Love Spin

=== Compilation albums ===
- 2002 - The Blues: From Yesterday's Masters to Today's Cutting Edge Shanachie, American Roots Songbook, as licensed to St. Clair Entertainment. (includes Debbie Davies: "I Just Want To Make Love To You")
