= Sudden Stop =

Studio album by Colin James
- Released: June 15, 1990
- Recorded: 1990
- Genre: Blues rock
- Length: 43:05
- Label: Virgin
- Producer: Joe Hardy

Colin James chronology
Colin James (1988)	Sudden Stop (1990)	Colin James and the Little Big Band (1993)

Professional ratings
Review scores
Source	Rating
AllMusic	3/5 stars

Sudden Stop is the second studio album by Canadian blues musician Colin James released in 1990 on Virgin Records. The album was recorded in Vancouver and Memphis, Tennessee.

The album features guest appearances by Bonnie Raitt, The Memphis Horns and Bobby Whitlock. "Just Came Back" went up to number 3 on North American rock stations.

Sudden Stop earned James two Juno Awards in 1991 in the Single of the Year ("Just Came Back") and Male Vocalist of the Year categories.

== Commercial performance ==
Sudden Stop peaked at number 9 on the Canadian Albums Chart and was certified Platinum in Canada. It was the fourth-best selling Cancon album in Canada of 1990. By May 1998, the album had sold 194,430 units in Canada.

== Track listing ==
1. "Just Came Back" (Colin James, Daryl Burgess) – 4:56
2. "Keep On Loving Me Baby" (Otis Rush) – 3:40
3. "Show Me" (Jerry Lynn Williams) – 3:24
4. "Give It Up" (Williams) – 4:03
5. "Crazy Over You" (Williams) – 5:11
6. "T for Trouble" (James, Bill Carter, Ruth Ellsworth) – 4:20
7. "Cross My Heart (James, Carter, Ellsworth) – 3:18
8. "Just One Love" (Williams, James) – 3:33
9. "If You Lean on Me" (Lotti Golden, Tommy Faragher) – 4:48
10. "Sudden Stop" (Bobby Russell) – 5:52

== Credits ==
=== Musicians ===
- Colin James – vocals, electric and acoustic guitar
- Dennis Marcenko – bass
- Darrell Mayes – drums, percussion
- Rene Spooner – percussion
- Rick Hopkins – Hammond organ, piano, synthesizer
- Bobby Whitlock – piano
- Bonnie Raitt – guest artist, backing vocals
- John Ferreira – tenor saxophone, baritone saxophone
- Phyllis Duncan, Susanne Jerome Taylor, William Brown – backing vocals
- The Memphis Horns (Andrew Love, Wayne Jackson)

=== Technical ===
- Joe Hardy – producer, engineer, mixing
- Greg Fulginiti – mastering

== Certifications ==
Certifications for Sudden Stop
Region	Certification	Certified units/sales
Canada (Music Canada)	Platinum	100,000^{^}
^{^} Shipments figures based on certification alone.
