= The Fuse (band) =

Band from the East of Scotland

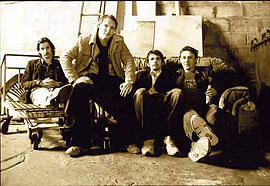
- The Fuse

Background information
- Origin: Edinburgh, Scotland
- Genres: Indie rock
- Years active: 1998 – 2005
- Labels: Holier Than Thou / Sleepwalker Records
- Past members: Kirk Kettles - Vocals; Rob Doig - Guitar; Garth Coates - Bass (1998-2000); Keith Livingstone - Bass (2000-03); Tash - Bass (2003-04); Craig Stark - Drums (1998-2003); Ted Heagle - Drums (2003-04); Dave Philp - Guitar, Bass (1999, 2005)

The Fuse were an indie rock band from Edinburgh, Scotland that were active between 1998 and 2005.

== History ==
The band was formed in 1998. The initial line up comprised Kirk Kettles (vocals), Rob Doig (guitar), Garth Coates (bass) and Craig Stark (drums). After two years of sporadic gigging around the UK, they released their self-produced debut EP, The Ballad of Charles Godfrey Stilton in 2001 on music streaming platform PeopleSound. Coates left the band in 2000 and was replaced by Keith Livingstone. A further development of the lineup came in 2003 when Livingstone and Stark were replaced by Tash and Ted Heagle.

2003 also saw the release of the single High Society, recorded by Duncan Cameron (Teenage Fanclub, BMX Bandits, Travis) and produced by David Scott (The Pearlfishers). The Fuse released their debut album North Eastern Town in 2004. The album was described as a melding of Idlewild with The Undertones and The Wedding Present.

The band played a series of dates in the US while promoting North Eastern Town, playing gigs at CBGB, Kenny's Castaways, and the Chelsea hotel. The Fuse continued to tour throughout 2005 and were invited to record a live session for Vic Galloway's BBC Radio Scotland radio show.

They disbanded in late 2005. Rob Doig went on to play bass for The Gothenburg Address while Ted Heagle became manager of The High Dials and now runs a records label called Sunny Lane Records

== Discography ==
=== Studio albums ===
- North Eastern Town (2004)

=== EPs and singles ===
- Winos Paradise (1998)
- Charles Godfrey Stilton (2000)
- Distinct Impression (2002)
- High Society (2003)

=== Compilations ===
- Independent sound UK (2002) The Fuse contributed the song Runaround to this compilation album from Holier Than Thou Records
