= Fuse Universal =

Fuse Universal Limited
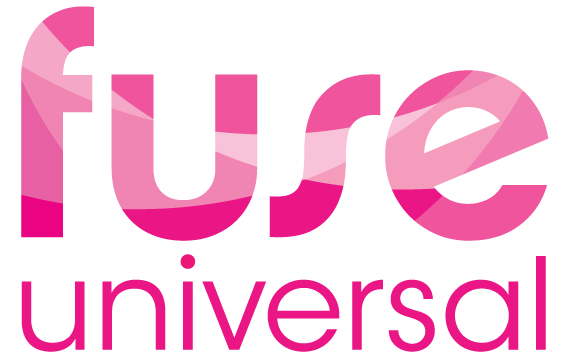
- Fuse Universal Logo
- Trade name: Fusion Universal Limited (2008–2015)
- Founded: July 2, 2008; 17 years ago
- Founder: Steve Dineen
- Headquarters: 1 Curtain Road, London, EC2; United Kingdom
- Area served: Worldwide
- Products: Fuse
- Brands: Fuse
- Services: Fuse Create Fuse Consult

Fuse Universal Limited is a company based in Shoreditch, a district in London, England. It was founded in 2008 by Steve Dineen, the C.E.O.

The main product is the Fuse platform. The platform is entirely cloud-based using Amazon Web Services, built on Ruby on Rails, and available on devices supporting iOS and Android systems.

As well as the Fuse platform, Fuse Universal offers professional services such as Fuse Create and Fuse Consult. Fuse Universal runs its foundation called Fuse School, a non-profit arm of the organization offering educational videos to children and adults worldwide via YouTube and the Fuse School (also written "FuseSchool") platform.

== History ==
Fuse founder Steve Dineen began work at Ingram Micro in pre-sales consultancy until being allowed to pursue training and teaching via high-end systems. Afterwards, he founded eLearning Company Fuel which was subsequently sold 10 years later to a U.S. compliance and ethics Company in 2007.

The main product, the Fuse platform, evolved from the Fuse School. This is a foundation and charity, established in 2008, helping to share free of charge math, English, and I.C.T. secondary school curricula worldwide.

Two years later, in 2010, the platform sold on licenses and released Fuse under Fusion Universal. After two and half years of operating in the market, the company was renamed Fuse Universal.

== Products and services ==
=== Fuse ===
Fuse is a cloud-based platform that allows individuals to capture and share knowledge, questions, and ideas in video, audio, or text format. The purpose of the software is to increase information accessibility within a company by recording and sharing examples of best practice or discussions from experts in the same industry.

The Fuse platform can be accessed from an internet-enabled device, such as a smartphone, tablet, computer, or laptop.
