= Fuse (Colin James album) =

Studio album by Colin James
- Released: 14 November 2000
- Genre: Blues
- Length: 52:59
- Label: Warner
- Producer: Joe Hardy, Colin James, Craig Northey

Colin James chronology
Colin James and the Little Big Band II (1999)	Fuse (2000)	Traveler (2003)

Fuse is the seventh studio album by the Canadian blues/rock musician Colin James, which was released in 2000.

== Track listing ==
1. "Hide" – 4:48
2. "Mystery to Me" – 4:25
3. "Stop Bringing it Down on a Perfect Day" – 3:47
4. "Carried Away" – 4:53
5. "Getting Higher" – 4:22
6. "Something Good" – 3:48
7. "It Ain't Over" – 3:56
8. "Of All the Things to Throw Away" – 4:08
9. "Big Bad World" – 4:37
10. "Hate It When I See You Cry" – 4:57
11. "Get to the Bottom" – 3:21
12. "Going's Good" – 4:17

== Personnel ==
- Colin James - guitars, vocals
- Pat Steward - drums, percussion
