= Fuse (Fuse album) =

Debut rock album by Fuse

Studio album by Fuse
- Released: January 1970
- Recorded: October 4–November 4, 1968
- Studios: Columbia Studios, Chicago
- Genres: Hard rock; psychedelic rock
- Length: 38:28
- Label: Epic
- Producer: Jackie Mills

Fuse is the only studio album by the rock band Fuse. It was recorded in 1968 and released in January 1970, before they broke up and with members going on to form Cheap Trick and Silver Fox.

== Production and release ==
Fuse was born in Rockford, Illinois, in 1967. A single was released on Ken Adamany's Smack Records label with the tunes "Hound Dog" and "Crusin for Burgers." In 1968, an album was recorded with producer Jackie Mills and released in January 1970. The titles of the single appear on the CD "Re-issue" by Rewind.

== Critical reception ==
The album was not as successful as the band or label had hoped. According to Richie Unterberger of Allmusic, "The album is an average, perhaps somewhat below average, late-'60s hard rock recording. It looks forward to some facets of '70s metal and art rock in its overwrought vocals, tandem hard rock guitar riffs, and classical-influenced keyboards."

== Track listing ==
All songs arranged by Fuse, except for "To Your Health", arranged by Chip Greenman, Craig Meyers, Rick Nielsen, and Tom Peterson

Side 1

1. "Across The Skies"- (Joe Sundberg, Rick Nielsen) - 4:35
2. "Permanent Resident" - (Craig Meyers, Sundberg) - 4:22
3. "Show Me" - (Nielsen) - 4:13
4. "To Your Health" - (Nielsen) - 6:00

Side 2

5. "In A Window" - (Sundberg, Nielsen) - 5:54
6. "4/4 3/4" - (Meyers, Sundberg) - 3:58
7. "Mystery Ship" - (Meyers, Sundberg) - 3:22
8. "Sad Day" - (Nielsen) - 5:49

(see Epic Records label BN26502)

== Personnel ==
- Joe Sundberg - vocals
- Craig Meyers - lead guitar
- Rick Nielsen - organ, Mellotron, rhythm guitar
- Tom Peterson - bass
- Chip Greenman - drums
