= Duke Robillard =

American guitarist and singer (born 1948)

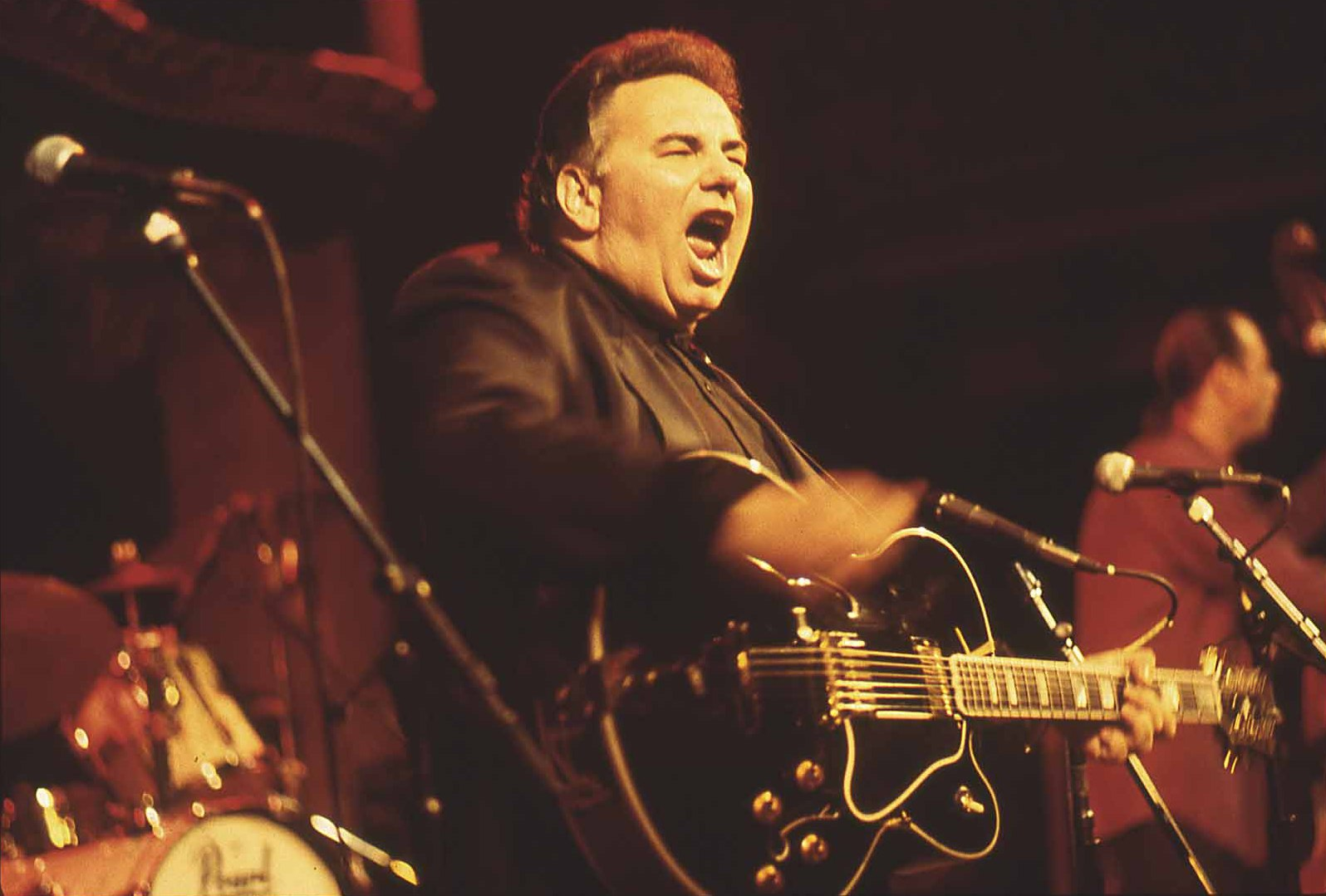
- Robillard in May 2006

Background information
- Born: Michael John Robillard; October 4, 1948 (age 78); Woonsocket, Rhode Island, U.S.
- Genres: Blues, blues rock, rockabilly, jump blues, swing
- Occupations: Musician; singer; songwriter
- Instrument: Guitar
- Years active: 1967–present
- Labels: Stony Plain Records; Rounder Records; Black Top Records; Pointblank Records; Flying Fish Records; Columbia Records
- Website: dukerobillard.com

Michael John "Duke" Robillard (born October 4, 1948) is an American guitarist and singer. He founded the band Roomful of Blues and was a member of the Fabulous Thunderbirds. Although he is known as a rock and blues guitarist, he also plays jazz and swing.

== Career ==
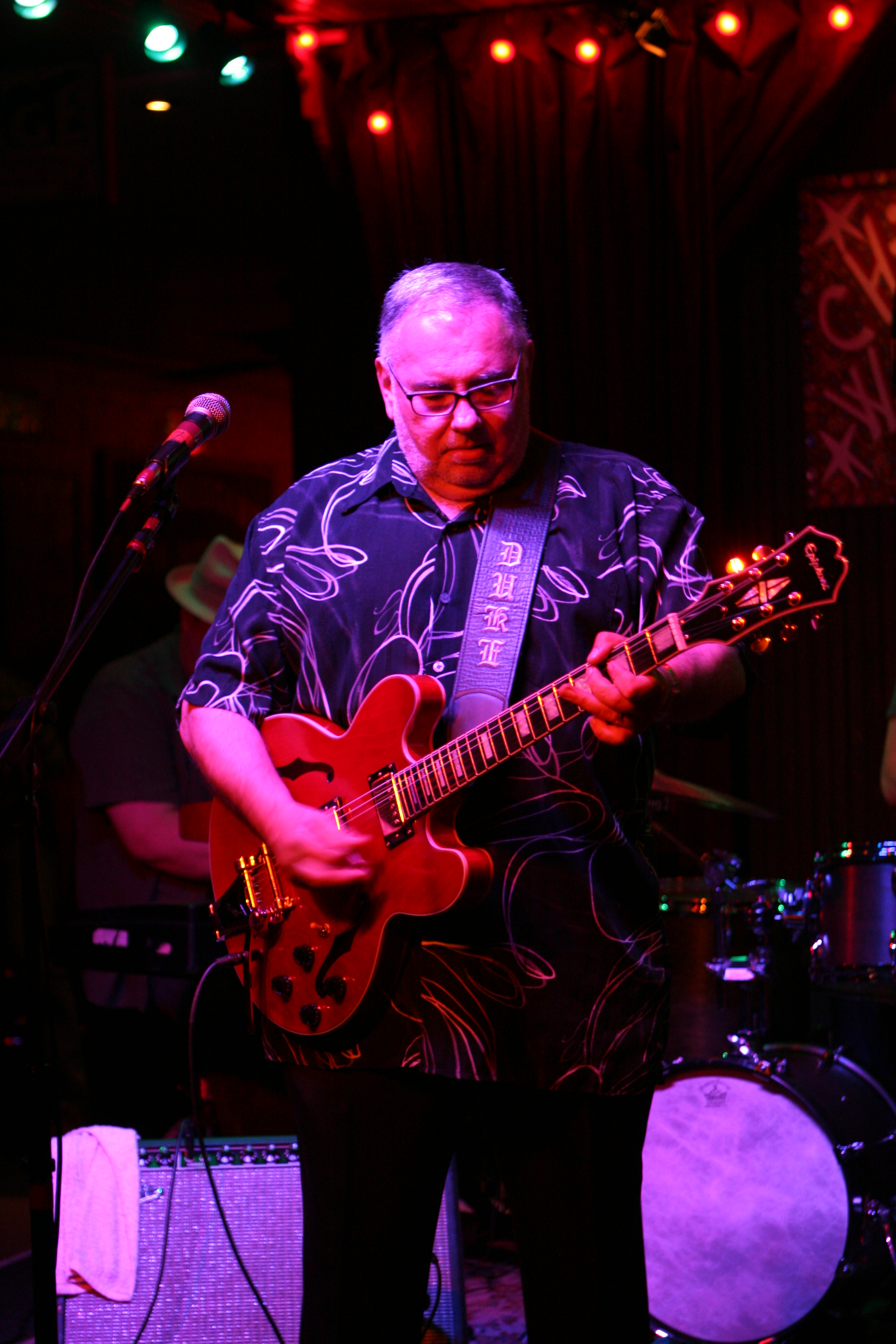
Duke Robillard performing at Chickie Wah Wah in Downtown New Orleans, May 2012

He was born in Woonsocket, Rhode Island. He played in bands as Mike "Honey Bear" Robillard and worked for the Guild Guitar Company based in Oxnard, California. In 1967, he and Al Copley founded the band Roomful of Blues.

Robillard spent over ten years with Roomful of Blues before departing in 1979, becoming the guitarist for singer Robert Gordon and then a member of the Legendary Blues Band. Robillard started the Duke Robillard Band in 1981, eventually adopting the name Duke Robillard and the Pleasure Kings, with whom he toured throughout the 1980s and recorded for Rounder Records. He became a member of the Fabulous Thunderbirds in 1990 to replace Jimmie Vaughan.

Although he was a member of bands, Robillard simultaneously pursued a solo career in which he toured and recorded solo albums in other genres, such as jazz and blues. He formed a duo with jazz guitarist Herb Ellis and New Guitar Summit, a swing trio with Gerry Beaudoin and J. Geils. He explored jump blues in A Swingin Session with Duke Robillard, returned to his rhythm and blues roots in Stomp! The Blues Tonight, and covered blues songs from the 1940s and 1950s in Low Down and Tore Up. Briefly in 2013, he was the guitarist for Bob Dylan's tour.

Along with lap steel guitarist Joel Paterson, Robillard played on the 2015 album Clinch! by Danish blues group, The Blues Overdrive.

== Awards and honors ==
- Best Blues Guitarist, W. C. Handy Award, 2000, 2001, 2003, 2004. Keeping the Blues Alive Award for Producer, 2004. Traditional Blues Male Artist, 2010. Acousitic Blues Album of the Year, 2016, The Acoustic Blues & Roots of Duke Robillard; All from the International Blues Foundation; The 2001, 2002, 2003 Maple Blues Awards, International Artist of the Year from the Toronto Blues Society, the highest blues honor in Canada
- Grammy nomination, Best Contemporary Blues Album, Guitar Groove-a-Rama, 2007
- Grammy nomination, Best Traditional Blues Album, Stomp! The Blues Tonight, 2010

== Discography ==
=== As leader/co-leader ===
- Duke Robillard & the Pleasure Kings (Rounder Records, 1984)
- Too Hot to Handle (Rounder, 1985)
- Swing (Rounder, 1987)
- You Got Me (Rounder, 1988)
- After Hours Swing Session (Rounder, 1990)
- Turn it Around (Rounder, 1991)
- Temptation (Pointblank Records, 1994)
- Duke's Blues (Pointblank, 1994)
- Dangerous Place (Pointblank, 1997)
- Stretchin' Out Live (Stony Plain Records, 1998)
- New Blues for Modern Man (Shanachie Records, 1999)
- La Palette Bleue (Dixiefrog Records, 1999)
- Conversations in Swing Guitar with Herb Ellis (Stony Plain, 1999)
- Explorer (Shanachie, 2000)
- Living with the Blues (Stony Plain, 2002)
- More Conversations In Swing Guitar with Herb Ellis (Stony Plain, 2003)
- Exalted Lover (Stony Plain, 2003)
- Blue Mood: The Songs of T-Bone Walker (Stony Plain, 2004)
- The Duke Meets the Earl with Ronnie Earl (Stony Plain, 2005)
- Guitar Groove-a-Rama (Stony Plain, 2006)
- Duke Robillard's World of Blues (Stony Plain, 2007)
- A Swingin' Session with Duke Robillard (Stony Plain, 2008)
- Stomp! The Blues Tonight (Stony Plain, 2009)
- Tales from the Tiki Lounge with Sunny Crownover (Blue Duchess, 2010)
- Passport to the Blues (Stony Plain, 2010)
- Low Down and Tore Up (Stony Plain, 2011)
- Wobble Walkin' (Blue Duchess Records, 2012)
- Independently Blue (Stony Plain, 2013)
- Calling All Blues (2014) (Stony Plain)
- The Acoustic Blues & Roots of Duke Robillard (Stony Plain, 2015)
- Blues Full Circle (Stony Plain, 2016)
- Duke Robillard and His Dames of Rhythm (M.C. Records, 2017)
- Ear Worms (Stony Plain, 2019)
- Blues Bash! (Stony Plain, 2020)
- Swingin' Again with Scott Hamilton (Blue Duchess, 2021)
- They Called It Rhythm & Blues (Stony Plain, 2022)
- Roll With Me (2024) (Stony Plain)
- BLAST OFF! (2025) (Nola Blue Records)

With Roomful of Blues

- Roomful of Blues (1978)
- Let's Have a Party (1979)

With The Fabulous Thunderbirds

- Walk That Walk, Talk That Talk (1991)
- Wrap It Up (1993) compilation

With New Guitar Summit (Duke Robillard/Jay Geils/Gerry Beaudoin)

- New Guitar Summit (Stony Plain, 2004)
- Live at the Stoneham Theater (Stony Plain, 2004)
- Shivers (Stony Plain, 2009)

=== As sideman or guest ===
With Al Basile

- Blue Ink (2004)
- Down on Providence Plantation (2005)
- Groovin' in the Mood Room (2006)
- The Tinge (2008)
- Soul Blue (2009)
- The Goods (2010)
- At Home Next Door (2012)

With Joe Beard

- For Real (AudioQuest Music, 1998)
- Dealin' (AudioQuest, 2000)

With Gerry Beaudoin

- Minor Swing (1994)
- Swing Cafe (2005)

With Eddy Clearwater

- Cool Blues (1998)
- Reservation Blues (2000)

With Al Copley

- Royal Blue (1991)
- Good Understanding (1994)

With Ronnie Earl

- Soul Searchin' (1988)

With Sax Gordon

- Have Horn, Will Travel (1998)
- You Knock Me Out (2000)

With Scott Hamilton

- Blues, Bop & Ballads (1999)
- Across the Tracks (2008)
- Remembering Billie (2013)

With Jay McShann

- Hootie's Jumpin' Blues (1997)
- Still Jumpin' the Blues (1999)
- Goin' to Kansas City (2003)

With Jerry Portnoy

- Poison Kisses (1991)
- Home Run Hitter (1995)
- Down in the Mood Room (2002)

With Jimmy Witherspoon

- Spoon's Blues (1995)
- Jimmy Witherspoon with the Duke Robillard Band (2000)

With others

- Too Cool to Move, Snooky Pryor (1992) (Antone's Records)
- Pinetop's Boogie Woogie, Pinetop Perkins (1992) (Antone's)
- Toolin' Around Arlen Roth (1993) (Blue Plate Records)
- Married to the Blues, Mark Hummel (1995) (Flying Fish Records)
- Found True Love, John Hammond (1996) (Pointblank)
- Time Out of Mind, Bob Dylan (1997) (Columbia)
- Wiggle Outta This, Curtis Salgado (1999)
- The Blues Keep Me Holding On, Savoy Brown (1999)
- A Good Day for the Blues, Ruth Brown (1999)
- West Coast House Party, Kid Ramos (2000)
- Three Feet Off the Ground, Bruce Katz (2000)
- Memphis, Tennessee, Rosco Gordon (2000)
- Blow Mr. Low, Doug James (2001)
- Love the Game, Debbie Davies (2001)
- Boogie 'n' Shuffle, Billy Boy Arnold (2001)
- Guitar, Jimmy Thackery (2003)
- Blues in My Heart, Chris Flory (2003)
- Introducing... Sunny and Her Joy Boys (2009)
- Between a Rock and the Blues, Joe Louis Walker (2009)
- Porchlight, Todd Sharpville (2010)
- Too Much Mustard, Wentus Blues Band (2019)
