= Fusee =

Fusee or fusée may refer to:

- Fusee (horology), a component of a clock
- Fusee, an alternate term for a flare
- Fusee, an old word for "flintlock, rifle, particularly a light musket"

== See also ==
- Fuser (disambiguation)
