= I Want a Little Girl (Eddie "Cleanhead" Vinson album) =

Studio album by Eddie "Cleanhead" Vinson
- Released: 1981
- Recorded: February 10, 1981
- Studios: Spectrum Studio, Venice, CA
- Genre: Jazz
- Length: 39:41
- Labels: Pablo; 2310-866
- Producer: Norman Granz

Eddie "Cleanhead" Vinson chronology
Kansas City Shout (1980)	I Want a Little Girl (1981)	Eddie "Cleanhead" Vinson & Roomful of Blues (1982)

I Want a Little Girl is an album by saxophonist/vocalist Eddie "Cleanhead" Vinson. It was recorded and released by the Pablo label in 1978.

== Reception ==
Professional ratings
Review scores
Source	Rating
AllMusic	4.5/5 stars
The Penguin Guide to Jazz Recordings	3/4 stars

The AllMusic review by Scott Yanow stated: "Eddie 'Cleanhead' Vinson, 64 at the time of this Pablo recording, is in superior form on the blues-oriented material. ... this is a particularly strong release. ... he still infuses these versions with enthusiasm and spirit, making this set a good example of Cleanhead's talents in his later years".

== Track listing ==
1. "I Want a Little Girl" (Billy Moll, Murray Mencher) – 5:30
2. "Somebody's Gotta Go" (Big Bill Broonzy) – 4:44
3. "Blues in the Closet" (Oscar Pettiford) – 5:12
4. "No Good for Me" (Eddie Vinson, Joe Medwick) – 4:39
5. "Stormy Monday" (T-Bone Walker) – 10:50
6. "Straight, No Chaser" (Thelonious Monk) – 5:42
7. "Worried Mind Blues" (Art Hillery) – 3:04

== Personnel ==
- Eddie "Cleanhead" Vinson – alto saxophone, vocals
- Martin Banks – trumpet
- Rashid Jamal Ali – tenor saxophone
- Art Hillery – piano, organ
- Cal Green – guitar
- John Heard – bass
- Roy McCurdy – drums
