= Blue Mood: The Songs of T-Bone Walker =

Blue Mood

Studio album by Duke Robillard
- Released: 2004
- Genre: Blues, jump blues, rhythm and blues, swing revival
- Label: Stony Plain
- Producer: Duke Robillard

Duke Robillard chronology
Exalted Lover (2003)	Blue Mood (2004)	The Duke Meets the Earl (2004)

Professional ratings
Review scores
Source	Rating
AllMusic	4/5 stars
The Encyclopedia of Popular Music	3/5 stars
The Penguin Guide to Blues Recordings	4/4 stars

Blue Mood: The Songs of T-Bone Walker is a tribute album by Duke Robillard, dedicated to the songs of T-Bone Walker.

== Critical reception ==
JazzTimes thought that Robillard "has the appropriately funky, slicing tone on 'T-Bone Shuffle', and 'T-Bone Boogie'."

AllMusic wrote that "the barroom blues and drum brushes on 'Love Is a Gamble' takes things down to a creepy crawl, bringing to mind Dr. John or Delbert McClinton."

== Track listing ==
All tracks composed by T-Bone Walker; except where noted.

1. "Lonesome Woman Blues" (John Henry) – 4:08
2. "T-Bone Shuffle" – 5:07
3. "Love Is a Gamble" (Edward Hale) – 4:37
4. "Alimony Blues" (Freddie Simon) – 3:28
5. "You Don't Love Me" – 4:13
6. "T-Bone Boogie" (T-Bone Walker, Marl Young) – 5:24
7. "Blue Mood" (Jessie Mae Robinson) – 3:10
8. "Pony Tail" (Dave Bartholomew, David J. O'Brian) – 3:07
9. "I'm Still in Love with You" (T-Bone Walker, Marl Young) – 8:58
10. "Hard Way" – 2:46
11. "Born to Be No Good" – 5:34
12. "Tell Me What's the Reason" (Florence Cadrez) – 2:49

== Personnel ==
- Duke Robillard - electric and acoustic guitars, vocals
- Matt McCabe - piano
- Jesse Williams - double bass
- Mark Teixeira - drums
- Doug James - baritone and tenor saxophone
- "Sax" Gordon Beadle - tenor saxophone
- Billy Novick - alto saxophone, clarinet
- Al Basile - cornet
- John Abrahamsen - trumpet
- Carl Querfurth – trombone

== Other credits ==
- Holger Petersen - Executive Producer
- John Paul Gauthier - Engineer, Recording, Mixing
