= Individual Computers Catweasel =

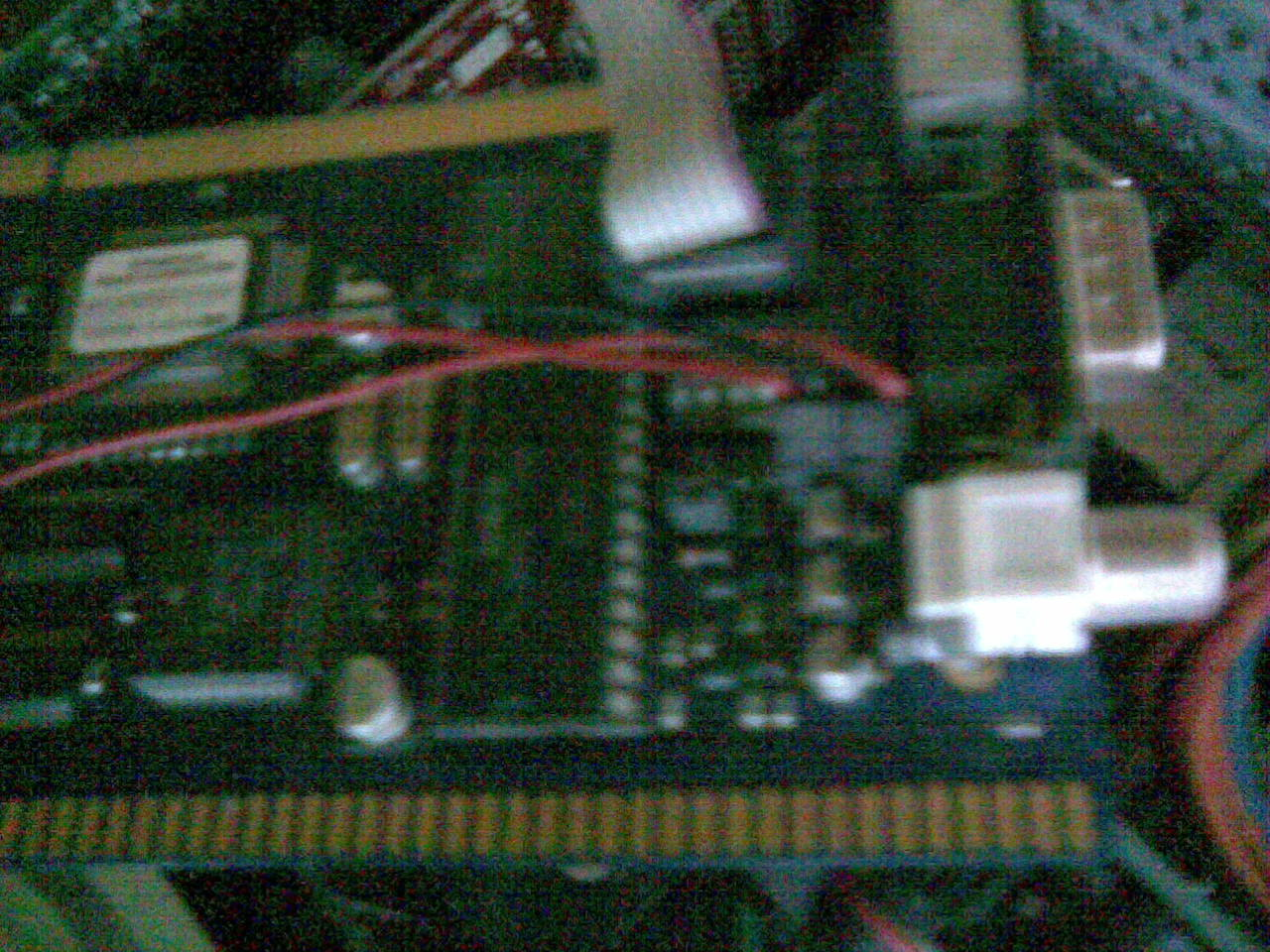
Part of a Mk3 (red/black audio cables)

The Catweasel is a family of enhanced floppy-disk controllers from German company Individual Computers. These controllers are designed to allow more recent computers, such as PCs, to access a wide variety of older or non-native disk formats using standard floppy drives.

== Principle ==
The floppy controller chip used in IBM PCs and compatibles was the NEC 765A. As technology progressed, descendants of these machines used what were essentially extensions to this chip. Many other computers, particularly ones from Commodore and early ones from Apple, write disks in formats which cannot be encoded or decoded by the 765A, even though the drive mechanisms are more or less identical to ones used on PCs. The Catweasel was therefore created to emulate the hardware necessary to produce these other low-level formats.

The Catweasel provides a custom floppy drive interface in addition to any other floppy interfaces the computer is already equipped with. Industry standard floppy drives can be attached to the Catweasel, allowing the host computer to read many standard and custom formats by means of custom software drivers.

Supported formats:

System	Floppy	Size
Amiga	3.5"	880, 1760 KB
Apple Macintosh	3.5"	400, 800, 720, 1440 KB
MS-DOS	3.5"	720, 1440 KB
MS-DOS	5.25"	360, 720, 800, 1200 KB
Atari ST	3.5"	360, 720, 800, 1440 KB
Atari 800 XL	5.25"	130, 180 KB
Apple II	5.25"	140 KB
CBM 1541	5.25"	170 KB
CBM 1571	5.25"	170, 341 KB
CBM 1581	3.5"	800 KB
Catweasel Extra	3.5"	1160, 2380 kB
Nintendo backup station	3.5"	1600 KB

== Versions ==
The initial version of the Catweasel was introduced in 1996 and has since undergone several revisions. The Catweasel Mk1 and Mk2, for the Commodore Amiga 1200 and Amiga 4000, sold out in October 2001. The Mk3 added PCI compatibility and sold out in mid-2004. It was succeeded by the Mk4. The Mk2 was re-released in 2006 as a special "Anniversary Edition".

=== Mk1 ===
The original version of the Catweasel was introduced in 1996 for the Amiga computer, and was available in two versions - one for the Amiga 1200 and one for the Amiga 4000. The Amiga 1200 version connected to the machine's clock port; the Amiga 4000 version connected to the machine's IDE port. A pass-through was provided on the Amiga 4000 version so that the IDE port could still be used for mass storage devices.

=== ISA ===
A version of the Catweasel controller was developed for use in a standard PC ISA slot as a means of reading custom non-PC floppy formats from MS-DOS. Custom DOS commands are required to use the interface. Official software and drivers are also available for Windows.

=== Mk2 and Mk2 Anniversary Edition ===
The Mk2 Catweasel was a redesign of the original Catweasel, merging the Amiga 1200 and Amiga 4000 versions into a single product that could be used on both computers, and providing a new PCB layout that allowed it to be more easily installed in a standard Amiga 1200 case.

The continued popularity of the Catweasel Mk2 led to a special "Anniversary Edition" of this model being released in 2006. The PCB of the Anniversary Edition received minor updates, however it retained the same form factor and functionality as the Mk2.

=== Z-II ===
The Catweasel Z-II version was an Amiga Zorro-II expansion that combined the Catweasel Mk2 controller with another Individual Computers product, the Buddha, on a single board providing floppy and IDE interfaces to the host computer.

=== Mk3 ===
The Catweasel Mk3 was designed to interface with either a PCI slot, an Amiga Zorro II slot or the clock port of an Amiga 1200. In addition to the low-level access granted to floppy drives, it has a socket for a Commodore 64 SID sound chip, a port for an Amiga 2000 keyboard, and two 9-pin digital joysticks (Atari 2600 de facto standard). The Mk3 was succeeded by the Mk4.

=== Mk4 and Mk4plus ===
The Catweasel Mk4 was officially announced on 18 July 2004, with a wide array of new features planned. However, due to manufacturing delays and production backlogs, the Mk4 was not released until early February 2005.

This version of the Catweasel makes heavy use of reconfigurable logic in the form of an Altera ACEX EP1K30TC144-3N FPGA chip, as well as an AMD MACH110 PLD and a PCI interface IC. The Mk4/Mk4+ driver uploads the FPGA microcode on start, which makes easy updates possible without having to replace hardware.

Official software and drivers are available for Windows, and unofficial drivers and utilities are available for Linux.

The Catweasel Mk4Plus appears to be no longer available.
