= Fuse (surname) =

Fuse (written: 布施) is a Japanese surname. Notable people with the surname include:

- Akira Fuse (布施 明, born 1947), Japanese singer
- Gennosuke Fuse (布施 現之助, 1880–1946), Japanese anatomist
- Masaru Fuse (布施 勝, born 1969), Japanese equestrian
- Tatsuji Fuse (布施 辰治, 1880–1953), Japanese lawyer and activist
- Tomoko Fuse (布施 知子, born 1951), Japanese origami artist and writer

== Fictional characters ==
- Kazuki Fuse, a character in the anime film Jin-Roh: The Wolf Brigade
