= Colin James & The Little Big Band: Christmas =

2007 album by Colin James

Christmas

Compilation album by Colin James
- Released: November 2007

Colin James & The Little Big Band: Christmas is an album by Colin James recorded in Nashville and released in November 2007. The album is a collection of Christmas songs, starting with a cover of Louis Armstrong's "Cool Yule".

== Track listing ==
1. "Cool Yule" (Steve Allen)
2. "Christmas Island" (Lyle Moraine)
3. "Boogie Woogie Santa Claus" (Leon René)
4. "I'll Be Home for Christmas" (Buck Ram, Kim Gannon, Walter Kent)
5. "Let It Snow! Let It Snow! Let It Snow!" (Sammy Cahn, Jule Styne)
6. "Merry Christmas Baby" (Lou Baxter and Johnny Moore)
7. "Blue Christmas" (Billy Hayes, Jay W. Johnson)
8. "Baby, It's Cold Outside" (Frank Loesser)
9. "Shake Hands with Santa Claus" (Louis Prima)
10. "Please Come Home for Christmas" (Charles Brown, Gene Redd)
11. "Go Where I Send Thee" (Traditional)
