= Sprinter (computer) =

Russian microcomputer which is ZX-Spectrum compatible

- Manufacturer: Peters Plus, Ltd.
- Type: Home computer
- Released: 1999; 27 years ago
- Discontinued: 2003; 23 years ago
- Operating system: Estex, Sinclair BASIC, TR-DOS
- CPU: Z84C15 @ 21MHz / 3.5MHz, Altera PLD
- Memory: 4MB RAM
- Display: SECAM TV, CGA monitor; 320 x 256 with 256 colors, 640 x 256 with 16 colors, text mode 80 x 32 with 16 colors
- Sound: Beeper, AY-3-8910, 16-bit DAC
- Backward compatibility: ZX Spectrum

The Sprinter (also called Peters Plus Sprinter or PPS) is a microcomputer made by the Russian firm Peters Plus, Ltd. It was the last ZX Spectrum clone produced in a factory.

It was built using what the company called a "Flex architecture", using an Altera PLD as part of the core logic. This allows the machine's hardware to be reconfigured on the fly for different ZX-Spectrum models compatibility or its own enhanced native mode (set by default on boot and running the Estex operating system).

== Specifications ==
The computer is built on a standard computer tower configuration, using standard floppy discs, CD-ROM and hard disk drives.

- CPU: Z84C15 at 21 MHz or 3.5 MHz, Altera PLD
- Video output: SECAM TV or CGA monitor
- Graphic modes: 320 x 256 with 256 colors, 640 x 256 with 16 colors, text mode 80 x 32 with 16 colors, 16 million color palette, 256/512 Kb video RAM
- Sound: Beeper, AY-3-8910, 16-bit DAC
- IDE & FDD onboard controllers
- Two ISA-8 slots
