= Colin James (album) =

Studio album by Colin James
- Released: August 13, 1988
- Recorded: 1988
- Studios: Criteria Studios, Miami, Florida
- Genre: Blues rock
- Length: 40:13
- Label: Virgin
- Producers: Danny Kortchmar, Tom Dowd, Bob Rock

Colin James chronology
Colin James (1988)	Sudden Stop (1990)

Professional ratings
Review scores
Source	Rating
AllMusic	4/5 stars

Colin James is the debut album by Canadian rock/blues musician Colin James, released in 1988. The album featured several hit singles, including "Five Long Years", "Voodoo Thing", "Chicks 'n Cars (And the Third World War)" and Why'd You Lie".

The album earned James a Juno Award for "Most Promising Artist".

== Commercial performance ==
James' debut album was the 15th best-selling Cancon album in Canada of 1989. The album was certified Double Platinum in Canada in 1994. By May 1998, the album had sold 276,338 units in Canada. It is the best-selling album of James' career to date.

== Track listing ==
1. "Five Long Years" – 4:36
2. "Voodoo Thing" – 3:38
3. "Down in the Bottom" (Willie Dixon) – 4:37
4. "Chicks 'n Cars (And the Third World War)" (Johnny Ferreira, Rick Hopkins, Colin James, Darrell Mayes) – 3:35
5. "Why'd You Lie" (Morgan Davis) – 5:25
6. "Hidden Charms" (Willie Dixon) – 3:26
7. "Bad Girl" (Rick Hopkins, Colin James, Dennis Marcenko) – 3:34
8. "Lone Wolf" – 3:40
9. "Dream of Satin" – 4:43
10. "Three Sheets to the Wind" (Rick Hopkins) – 2:59

== Personnel ==
- Colin James – guitar, vocals, background vocals
- Steve Croes – keyboards
- Richard Hopkins – piano, keyboards, Hammond organ
- Bill Payne – piano
- David Burgin – harmonica
- Johnny Ferreira – tenor and soprano saxophones
- Dennis Marcenko – bass
- Darrell Mayes – percussion, drums
- Betty Wright – background vocals
- Bill Cowsill – background vocals

== Production ==
- Tom Dowd – producer
- Danny Kortchmar – producer, mixing
- Bob Rock – producer
- Mike Fraser – engineer
- Shep Lonsdale – engineer
- Simon Pressey – engineer
- Duane Seykora – engineer, assistant engineer
- Charles Die – assistant engineer
- Neil Dorfsman – mixing
- Dan Hersch – mastering
- Brian Lynch – photography
- Melanie Nissen – design
- Jeffrey Kent Ayeroff – art direction
- Alberto Tolot – photography

== Certifications ==
Certifications for Colin James
Region	Certification	Certified units/sales
Canada (Music Canada)	2× Platinum	200,000^{^}
^{^} Shipments figures based on certification alone.
