= Colin James =

Canadian singer-songwriter (born 1964)

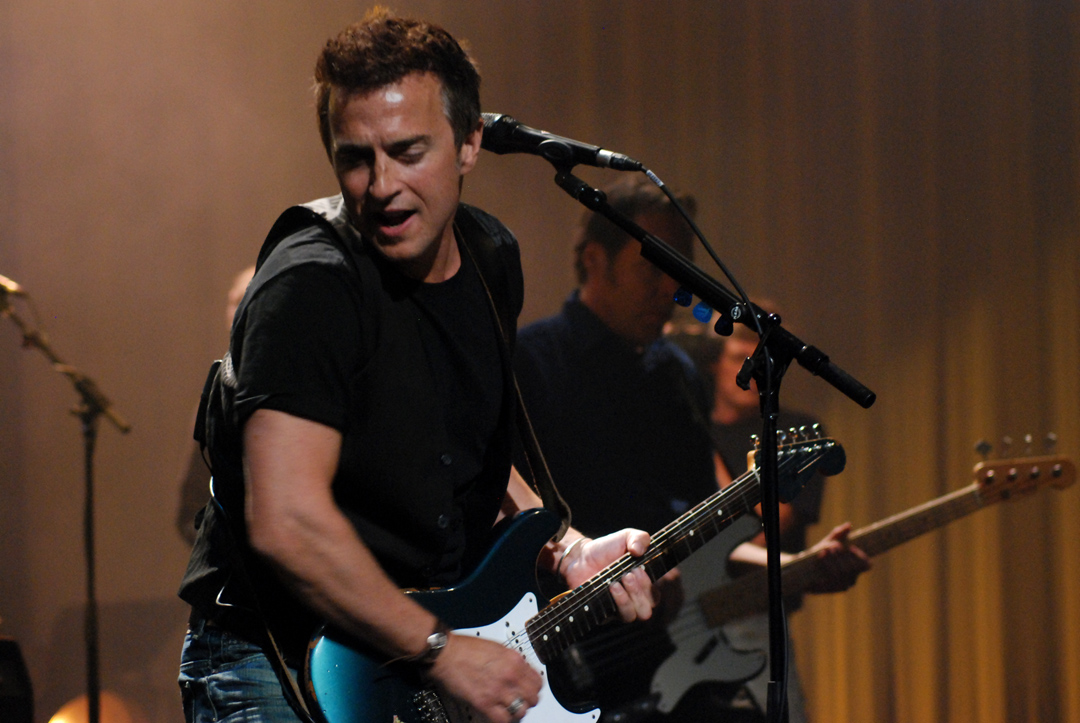
- Colin James in 2009

Background information
- Born: Colin James Munn; August 17, 1964 (age 62); Regina, Saskatchewan, Canada
- Genres: Blues rock; jump blues; swing revival
- Occupations: Musician, singer-songwriter, record producer
- Instruments: Guitar, vocals
- Years active: 1983–present
- Website: www.colinjames.com

Colin James OBC (born Colin James Munn; August 17, 1964) is a Canadian blues rock singer and songwriter. James has been very successful in Canada, having attained seven Gold-certified albums in Canada during his career, including four Platinum albums and two Double Platinum albums.

== Biography ==
=== Early years ===
James was born in Regina, Saskatchewan, Canada. His grandfather was Serbian. James quit school in Grade 10. James got his break in his music career opening for Stevie Ray Vaughan in Regina in 1983. When the scheduled opening act did not show, he only had a few hours' notice to put together a set of blues standards with members from the local Regina band "Flying Colours". Vaughan invited James to perform with him during the encore, and then join his tour as a permanent opening act. He and his band The Hoodoo Men opened for Vaughan for several tour dates in the United States. According to legend, Vaughan himself suggested the stage name "Colin James", because when announced over arena P.A. systems, "Munn" sounded like "Mud". James also played guitar on Richard Marx's song "Thunder and Lightning".

=== Rock, swing and blues career ===
In 1987, James won the CASBY Award for "Most Promising Artist". In 1988, following his association with Vaughan, James released his self-titled debut album, which yielded several international hit singles, as did the follow-up Sudden Stop. He presaged the mid-1990s swing music revival with his Colin James and the Little Big Band project, which released a successful first CD in 1993, with a follow-up gold record in 1998, a third disc 2006, and a Christmas album in 2007.

James's worldwide popularity waned somewhat in the late 1990s, but he continued to release albums in rock, blues, and acoustic styles. In 2005, he gave a command performance for Queen Elizabeth II during her visit to his home province of Saskatchewan.

James' backing band frequently includes members of the Vancouver-based band Odds, and he has co-written songs with Odds singer-guitarist Craig Northey. In February 2005, James guest-starred in an episode of the television program Corner Gas, a Canadian sitcom based in rural Saskatchewan.

In 2007, James' album Limelight received a Gold record for sales in Canada. In January 2008, James received three Toronto Blues Society Maple Blues Awards: "Entertainer of the Year", "Electric Act of the Year" and "Recording of the Year" for Colin James & The Little Big Band 3.

In 2009, James recorded the album Rooftops and Satellites with, among others, Junkhouse frontman Tom Wilson. The album was co-produced, engineered and mixed by Mike Fraser, at The Warehouse Studio in Vancouver. Rooftops and Satellites reached #69 on the Canadian Albums Chart.

James' 2016 album Blue Highways spent 10 weeks at No.1 on the Roots Music Report's Blues Chart following its debut, and appeared in Living Blues magazine's Top 50 albums of that year. Its follow-up, Miles To Go, was released in September 2018, to equal acclaim entering the top 10 blues charts in Canada, USA, UK and Australia.

=== Personal life ===
James has been married to his wife Heather since 1989. They have two grown children and live in suburban Vancouver.

== Discography ==
=== Studio albums ===
- Colin James (1988)
- Sudden Stop (1990)
- Colin James and the Little Big Band (1993)
- Bad Habits (1995)
- National Steel (1997)
- Colin James and the Little Big Band II (1998)
- Fuse (2000)
- Traveler (2003)
- Limelight (2005)
- Colin James & The Little Big Band 3 (2006)
- Colin James & The Little Big Band: Christmas (2007)
- Rooftops and Satellites (2009)
- Fifteen (2012)
- Hearts on Fire (2015)
- Blue Highways (2016)
- Miles to Go (2018)
- Open Road (2021)
- Chasing the Sun (2024)

=== Live albums ===
- Twenty Five Live (2013)

=== Compilation albums ===
- Then Again... (1995)
- Take It from The Top: The Best of Colin James (2011)

=== Guest appearances ===
- Long John Baldry – It Still Ain't Easy (1991)
- Bonnie Raitt - "give it up" (1990)
- Richard Marx – "Thunder and Lightning" (1991)
- The Chieftains – Another Country (1992)
- Johnny Hallyday – Rough Town (1994)
- The Chieftains – Long Black Veil (1995)
- Don Freed – Live, ARR! (1993; credited as Colin James Munn)
- Long John Baldry – Right To Sing The Blues (1996)
- JW-Jones Blues Band – My Kind of Evil (2004)
- Craig Northey and Jesse Valenzuela – Northey Valenzuela (2004)
- Bernard Allison – Highs & Lows (2022)

=== Singles ===
Year	Title	Peak chart positions		Album
Year	Title	CAN	US Main. Rock	Album
1986	"Five Long Years" (released by Bumstead Records)	—	—	Colin James
1988	"Voodoo Thing"	19	30	Colin James
1989	"Dream of Satin"	49	—	Colin James
1989	"Chicks 'n Cars (And the Third World War)"	51	—	Colin James
1989	"Five Long Years" (released by Virgin Records)	16	—	Colin James
1989	"Why'd You Lie"	—	—	Colin James
1989	"Back in My Arms Again"	80	—	American Boyfriends (soundtrack)
1990	"Just Came Back"	5	7	Sudden Stop
1990	"Keep On Loving Me Baby"	35	21	Sudden Stop
1990	"If You Lean on Me"	74	—	Sudden Stop
1990	"T for Trouble"	—	—	Sudden Stop
1990	"Give It Up" (with Bonnie Raitt)	59	—	Sudden Stop
1992	"Love Thang"	—	—	Colin James and the Little Big Band
1993	"Cadillac Baby"	18	—	Colin James and the Little Big Band
1994	"Surely (I Love You)"	19	—	Colin James and the Little Big Band
1994	"Breakin' Up the House"	29	—	Colin James and the Little Big Band
1994	"No More Doggin'"	57	—	Colin James and the Little Big Band
1995	"Stay"	26	—	Then Again...
1995	"Freedom"	18	—	Bad Habits
1995	"Saviour"	8	—	Bad Habits
1996	"Real Stuff"	26	—	Bad Habits
1997	"Fixin' to Die"	—	—	National Steel
1998	"Let's Shout (Baby Work Out)"	36	—	Colin James and the Little Big Band II
1998	"C'mon with the C'mon"	—	—	Colin James and the Little Big Band II
2000	"Hide"	—	—	Fuse
2000	"Getting Higher"	—	—	Fuse
2003	"I'm Losing You"	—	—	Traveler
2003	"Make a Mistake"	—	—	Traveler
2004	"Know How to Love You"	—	—	Traveler
2005	"Far Away Like a Radio"	—	—	Limelight
2005	"Better Way to Heaven"	—	—	Limelight
2005	"Travelin'"	—	—	Limelight
2006	"Into the Mystic"	—	—	Limelight
2006	"If You Need Me"	—	—	Colin James & The Little Big Band 3
2009	"Man's Gotta Be a Stone"	—	—	Rooftops and Satellites
2009	"Lost Again"	—	—	Rooftops and Satellites
2009	"Wavelength"	—	—	Rooftops and Satellites
2010	"Johnny Coolman"	—	—	Rooftops and Satellites
2011	"It's Gonna Be Alright"	—	—	Take It From The Top: The Best Of Colin James
2012	"Stone Faith"	—	—	Fifteen
2012	"I Need You Bad"	—	—	Fifteen
2015	"Just a Little Love"	—	—	Hearts On Fire
2016	"Going Down"	—	—	Blue Highways
2016	"Riding in the Moonlight"	—	—	Blue Highways
2018	"40 Light Years"	—	—	Miles to Go
"—" denotes releases that did not chart or were not released in that country.

== Television appearance ==
James made a cameo in the Canadian television program Corner Gas, Season 2, episode 15, which was originally broadcast on February 21, 2005.

== Awards and honours ==
=== Juno Awards ===
James has been nominated for 17 Juno Awards, winning seven of them.

==== Wins ====
- 1989 – "Most Promising Male Vocalist of the Year"
- 1991 – "Single of the Year" for "Just Came Back"
- 1991 – "Male Vocalist of the Year"
- 1996 – "Male Vocalist of the Year"
- 1998 – "Best Blues Album for National Steel
- 1999 – "Best Producer" for "Let's Shout" and "C'mon with the C'mon" from Colin James and the Little Big Band II
- 2019 – "Blues Album of the Year" for "Miles to Go"
- 2022 – Blues Album Of The Year for “Open Road”

==== Nominations ====
- 1989 – "Canadian Entertainer of the Year"
- 1991 – "Canadian Entertainer of the Year"
- 1992 – "Canadian Entertainer of the Year"
- 1994 – "Best Blues/Gospel Album" for Colin James and The Little Big Band
- 1995 – "Male Vocalist of the Year"
- 1996 – "Best Video" for "Freedom"
- 1998 – "Best Male Vocalist"
- 1999 – "Best Blues Album for Colin James and The Little Big Band II
- 2007 – "Blues Album of the Year" for Colin James and The Little Big Band III
- 2013 – "Blues Album of the Year" for "Fifteen"
- 2017 – "Blues Album of the Year" for "Blue Highways"
- 2019 – Blues Album Of The Year for “Miles To Go”
- 2022 – Blues Album of the Year for Open Road

=== Maple Blues Awards ===
Colin James has been nominated for, and won, 20 Maple Blues Awards, between 1997 and 2018.

=== Other ===
James was made a member of the Order of British Columbia in 2024.

== See also ==
- Canadian blues
- Canadian rock
- Music of Canada
