= The Best of the Fabulous Thunderbirds: Early Birds Special =

Compilation album by The Fabulous Thunderbirds
- Released: 2011
- Genre: Texas blues, blues rock
- Label: Benchmark
- Producer: Denny Bruce and Jon Monday

The Best of the Fabulous Thunderbirds: Early Birds Special is a 2011 compilation album by Texas-based blues rock band The Fabulous Thunderbirds released on Benchmark Recordings. The album features a collection of songs from the original tracks from their first four albums, live versions, and the hits from their later albums, spanning their first decade of recording and touring.

== Track listing ==
1. "Rich Woman"
2. "She's Tuff"
3. "Tuff Enuff"
4. "Scratch My Back" (Live)
5. "Bad Boy"
6. "Low-Down Woman"
7. "Marked Deck"
8. "One's Too Many"
9. "I Believe I'm in Love"
10. "I Hear You Knockin'" (Live)
11. "Can't Tear It Up Enuff"
12. "You Ain't Nothin' but Fine"
13. "Wrap It Up"
14. "You're Humbugging Me"
15. "The Crawl" (Live)
16. "Full Time Lover" (Live)
17. "Los Fabulosos Thunderbirds"
18. "Powerful Stuff"

== Personnel ==
- Denny Bruce – co-producer
- Jon Monday – co-producer
- Kim Wilson – vocals and harmonica
- Jimmie Vaughan – guitar
- Mike Buck – drums
- Fran Christina – drums
- Keith Ferguson – bass
