= Butt Rockin' =

Studio album by the Fabulous Thunderbirds
- Released: 1981
- Genre: Roots rock; blues; Texas blues
- Length: 32:14
- Label: Chrysalis (Original); Benchmark (Reissue)
- Producer: Denny Bruce

The Fabulous Thunderbirds chronology
What's the Word (1980)	Butt Rockin' (1981)	T-Bird Rhythm (1982)

Professional ratings
Review scores
Source	Rating
AllMusic	4/5 stars
The Penguin Guide to Blues Recordings	2.5/4 stars
The Rolling Stone Album Guide	3.5/5 stars

Butt Rockin' is the third studio album by Texas-based blues rock band the Fabulous Thunderbirds, released in 1981. The recording took the band closer to old rhythm and blues and added additional musicians playing piano and brass. A 2000 CD reissue contains three bonus tracks.

== Track listing ==
All tracks composed by Kim Wilson; except where indicated

1. "I Believe I'm in Love"
2. "One's Too Many (And a Hundred Ain't Enough)" (Wilson, Nick Lowe)
3. "Give Me All Your Lovin'"
4. "Roll, Roll, Roll" (Eddie Shuler, Lonnie Brooks)
5. "Cherry Pink and Apple Blossom White" (Louiguy, Jacques Larue, Mack David)
6. "I Hear You Knockin'" (J.D. Miller)
7. "Tip On In" (Robert Holmes, James Moore, John Holmes)
8. "I'm Sorry"
9. "Mathilda" (Huey Thierry, George Khoury)
10. "Tell Me Why"
11. "In Orbit" (Wilson, Jimmie Vaughan, Keith Ferguson, Fran Christina)

=== Bonus tracks ===
1. "Found a New Love"
2. "I Got Eyes" (Johnny "Guitar" Watson)
3. "Someday You'll Want Me" (Dave Bartholomew, Pearl King)

== Personnel ==
The Fabulous Thunderbirds

- Kim Wilson - vocals, harmonica
- Jimmie Vaughan - guitar
- Keith Ferguson - bass
- Fran Christina - drums

with:

- Al Copley - piano
- Greg Piccolo - tenor saxophone
- Doug James - baritone saxophone
- Anson Funderburgh - second guitar on "Tip on In"
