= What's the Word =

Studio album by the Fabulous Thunderbirds
- Released: August 4, 1980
- Studios: Sumet-Bernet, Dallas, Texas
- Genres: Blues, R&B
- Length: 34:26 (Original)
- Labels: Chrysalis (Original); Benchmark (Reissue)
- Producer: Denny Bruce

The Fabulous Thunderbirds chronology
Girls Go Wild (1979)	What's the Word (1980)	Butt Rockin' (1981)

What's the Word is the second studio album by the Austin, Texas-based blues band the Fabulous Thunderbirds, released in 1980. Like its predecessor, the album initially sold poorly, but is now regarded as a noteworthy blues recording of the period. The 2000 CD reissue on Benchmark Records contains three bonus tracks, two of which were recorded live at Club Koda, Austin, Texas.

== Critical reception ==
Professional ratings
Review scores
Source	Rating
AllMusic	4.5/5 stars
The Penguin Guide to Blues Recordings	3/4 stars
The Rolling Stone Album Guide	3/5 stars

The Boston Globe wrote that the band "play no-frills, gut-bucket R&B and blues with enough enthusiasm and intensity to overcome any doubts one might have about their authenticity." "Girls Go Wild and What's the Word? are Texas barroom blues at their greasiest, and Kim Wilson's expressive delivery seems to ease his confusion at whether this woman that keeps popping up is his full- or part-time lover."

== Track listing ==
All tracks composed by Kim Wilson, except where indicated

1. "Runnin' Shoes" (Traditional, Juke Boy Bonner) – 3:38
2. "You Ain't Nothin' but Fine" (Sidney Simien, Floyd Soileau) – 1:48
3. "Low-Down Woman" – 3:15
4. "Extra Jimmies" (Jimmie Vaughan, Keith Ferguson) – 2:35
5. "Sugar Coated Love" (Audrey Butler, J.D. Miller) – 3:00
6. "Last Call for Alcohol" (Vaughan, Kim Wilson) – 2:55
7. "The Crawl" (Raymond Victoria, Wayne Shuler) – 2:15
8. "Jumpin Bad" (Vaughan, Wilson) – 2:25
9. "Learn to Treat Me Right" – 3:07
10. "I'm a Good Man (If You Give Me a Chance)" – 2:50
11. "Dirty Work" – 3:00
12. "That's Enough of That Stuff" – 2:05

== Bonus tracks on some editions ==
1. "Band Introduction by C-Boy" – 0:21
2. "Bad Boy" (Live) (Eddie Taylor) – 3:11
3. "Scratch My Back" (Live) (James Moore) – 5:06
4. "Los Fabulosos Thunderbirds" (Vaughan, Ferguson, Wilson) – 1:10
- "Los Fabulosos Thunderbirds" is track 13 on some earlier Chrysalis releases.

== Personnel ==
Musicians

- Kim Wilson – vocals, harmonica, simultaneous drums and harp on "Los Fabulosos Thunderbirds"
- Jimmie Vaughan – guitar
- Keith Ferguson – bass
- Fran Christina – drums (tracks 2, 4, 6, 8–10, 12) percussion on "Los Fabulosos Thunderbirds"
- Mike Buck – drums (tracks 1, 3, 5, 7, 11)

Technical

- Denny Bruce – producer
- Bob Sullivan – engineer
- Frank DeLuna – mastering
