= Benchmark Recordings =

- Founded: 2002
- Founder: Bill Coben, Denny Bruce
- Genre: Blues rock
- Country of origin: U.S.
- Official website: www.benchmarkrecordings.com

Benchmark Recordings is a record label that was founded in 2000 by music industry veterans Bill Coben and Denny Bruce.

The initial catalog included the first four albums by The Fabulous Thunderbirds, which were originally released in the late 1970s and early 1980s on the Takoma Records label and distributed by Chrysalis Records. The early albums featured Kim Wilson on vocals and harmonica and Jimmie Vaughan on guitar.

A compilation of live recordings and new material titled Tacos Deluxe was released in 2004.

In 2008 Jon Monday, who had worked with Denny and Bill at Takoma Records in the 1970s and 1980s, joined the company as its President.

A CD titled I'm With You Always by Mike Bloomfield, a live recording from 1977 (exact date unknown), was released in late 2008. The songs on the album are a catalog of blues history, spanning acoustic, Chicago, and blues-rock styles.

In 2011 Benchmark released a "Best of" collection documenting live and studio recordings from their first decade, titled, The Best of the Fabulous Thunderbirds: Early Birds Special. The album features a collection of songs from the original tracks from their first four albums, live versions, and the hits from their later albums: Tuff Enuff and Powerful Stuff.

The label is now co-owned by Jon Monday and Bill Coben.

== Catalog ==
- 8002-2 CD The Fabulous Thunderbirds, Girls Go Wild
- 8003-2 CD The Fabulous Thunderbirds, What's the Word
- 8004-2 CD The Fabulous Thunderbirds, Butt Rockin'
- 8005-2 CD The Fabulous Thunderbirds, T-Bird Rhythm
- 8006-2 CD The Fabulous Thunderbirds, Tacos Deluxe
- 8007-2 CD Mike Bloomfield, I'm With You Always
- 8008-2 CD The Fabulous Thunderbirds, The Best of the Fabulous Thunderbirds: Early Birds Special
