= Austin de Lone =

American keyboardist (1946–2025)

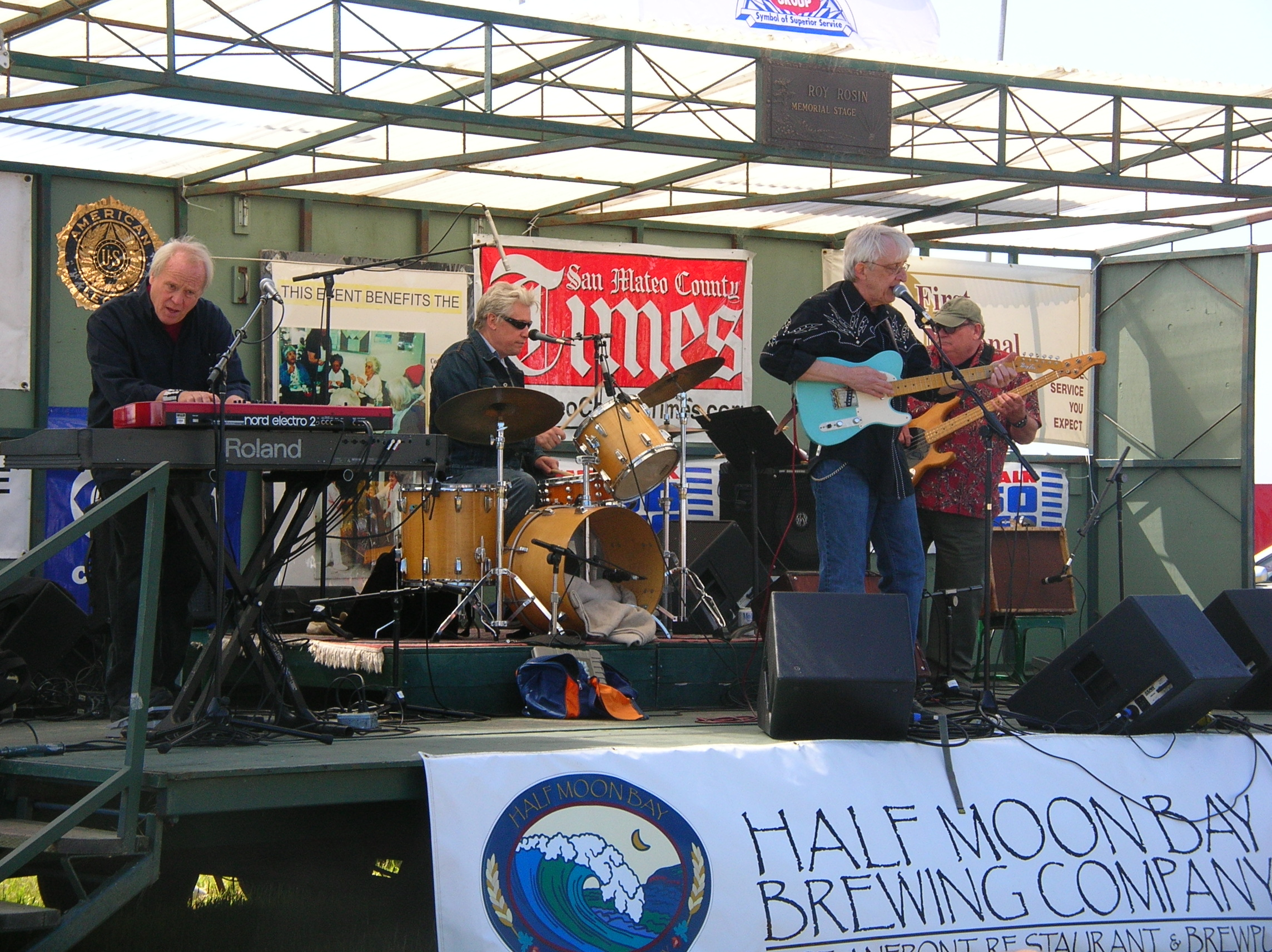
- Austin de Lone (left) with Bill Kirchen in 2009

Background information
- Born: 1946; Montgomery County, Pennsylvania, U.S.
- Died: January 6, 2025 (aged 78)
- Genres: Rock music
- Occupation: Musician
- Instrument: Piano
- Years active: 1969–present

Austin de Lone (1946 – January 6, 2025) was an American keyboardist who recorded and toured with his own bands as well as with other artists, such as Bill Kirchen, Elvis Costello, Bonnie Raitt, Boz Scaggs, Nick Lowe, Commander Cody, and Loudon Wainwright.

== Biography ==
=== Early years ===
De Lone grew up in suburban Philadelphia, taking piano lessons at age 12. His early influences included Ray Charles and George Shearing. After stints as a student at the New England Conservatory of Music, Harvard University, and University of California, Berkeley, he moved to Greenwich Village. While at Harvard, de Lone composed the song "One for One," which was the first single released by Linda Ronstadt and the Stone Poneys.

=== Eggs over Easy ===
In 1969, de Lone formed the band Eggs over Easy with Jack O'Hara and Brien Hopkins. In 1970, Chas Chandler persuaded the band to record in London, but those recordings were not released.

A four-night-a-week residency at a pub called the Tally-Ho in Kentish Town lasted more than a year. Eggs over Easy played a blend of blues, country, and rock that became known as pub rock. Regular attendees of their shows included members of Brinsley Schwarz and BBC disc jockey John Peel. In 1972, they returned to California and released their first album Good 'N' Cheap produced by Link Wray.

=== The Moonlighters ===
De Lone moved to Marin, California in 1972, where he met Bill Kirchen, who had been performing with Commander Cody and His Lost Planet Airmen. In the late 70s, de Lone joined Kirchen's side-project band, the Moonlighters. Their 1983 album Rush Hour was produced by Nick Lowe. Both de Lone and Kirchen later worked with Lowe and Elvis Costello.

De Lone and Kirchen continued to record and perform together. In 2016, they released their duet album Transatlantica.

=== The Christmas Jug Band ===
De Lone was a member of the Christmas Jug Band, a collection of musicians who have been touring locally each holiday season since 1976, and releasing albums since 1987. The band has included musicians such as Dan Hicks, Tim Eschliman, Jim Rothermel, Lance Dickerson, Brien Hopkins, and Norton Buffalo.

=== Richard de Lone Special Housing Project ===
De Lone coordinated an annual fundraiser for eventual construction of the Richard de Lone Special Housing Project, a residential facility for people with Prader-Willi Syndrome, which de Lone's son Richard is afflicted with. As part of the 2007 event, Elvis Costello reunited with Clover, the band who backed him on his first album My Aim is True.

=== Personal life ===
De Lone and his wife Lesley lived in Mill Valley, California. Their daughter Caroline de Lone is a singer, songwriter, and recording artist who has appeared with Buddy Miller and Bonnie Raitt.

=== Death ===
De Lone died of lung disease on January 6, 2025, at the age of 78.

== Discography ==
=== Solo albums ===
- 1991: De Lone at Last (Demon)
- 2007: Soul Blues (Broken Toe)

=== As a member of Eggs over Easy ===
- 1972, Good 'N' Cheap (A&M)
- 1980: Fear of Frying (Squish)
- 2016: Good 'N' Cheap: The Eggs Over Easy Story 3 LPs / 2 CDs (Yep Roc) compilation

=== As a member of the Moonlighters ===
- 1983: Rush Hour (Demon) reissued by Globe Records in 2006
- 2008: The Missing Moonlighters: Live/Studio Closet Tapes (Globe)

=== As a member of the Christmas Jug Band ===
- 1988: Mistletoe Jam (Relix)
- 1991: Tree-Side Hoot (Globe)
- 1997: Rhythm on the Roof (Globe)
- 2002: Uncorked (Globe)
- 2009: On the Holiday Highway (Globe)

=== As composer ===
- 1971: Grootna - Grootna (Columbia) - track 1, "I'm Funky" (co-written with Jack O'Hara and Al Silverman); track 3, "Going To Canada" (co-written with David Henry and Al Silverman); track 4, "Waitin' for My Ship" (co-written with Al Silverman); track 9, "Your Grandmother Loves You" / "I She It" (co-written with David Henry)
- 1973: James Montgomery Band - First Time Out (Capricorn) - track 2, "I'm Funky but I'm Clean" (co-written with Jack O'Hara and Peter Bell)

=== As primary artist/song contributor ===
- 2016: various artists - Christmas on the Lam and Other Songs from the Season (Red House) - track 2, "Santa Claus Wants Some Lovin'" (with Bill Kirchen)

=== As producer ===
- 1988: Commander Cody and His Lost Planet Airmen - Sleazy Roadside Stories (Relix)
- 1990: Commander Cody and His Lost Planet Airmen - Aces High (Relix)

=== Also appears on ===
- 1975: Loudon Wainwright III - Unrequited (Columbia)
- 1978: Jesse Barish - Jesse Barish (RCA Victor)
- 1980: Jesse Barish - Mercury Shoes (RCA)
- 1986: Commander Cody - Let's Rock's (Blind Pig)
- 1989: The Fabulous Thunderbirds - Powerful Stuff (Epic)
- 1990: Nick Lowe - Party of One (Reprise)
- 1991: The Fabulous Thunderbirds - Walk That Walk, Talk That Talk (Epic)
- 1993: Jesse Colin Young - Makin' It Real (Ridgetop)
- 1994: Boz Scaggs - Some Change (Virgin)
- 1995: Tommy Castro - Exception to the Rule (Blind Pig)
- 1996: Bill Kirchen - Have Love, Will Travel (Black Top)
- 1999: Bill Kirchen - Raise a Ruckus (HighTone)
- 2006: Sammy Hagar and the Wabos - Livin' It Up! (Rhino / Cabo Wabo)
- 2006: Bill Kirchen - Hammer of the Honky Tonk Gods (Proper)
- 2013: Liz Kennedy - Speed Bump (Clean White Shirt)
- 2015: Mighty Mike Schermer - Blues in Good Hands (Vizztone)
- 2019: Gayle Lynn and the Hired Hands - "Twirl Back Home" (JG Productions)
