= Different Tacos =

Compilation album by The Fabulous Thunderbirds
- Released: 1996
- Genre: Blues rock, Texas blues
- Label: Country Town
- Producer: Denny Bruce

The Fabulous Thunderbirds chronology
Roll of the Dice (1995)	Different Tacos (1996)	High Water (1997)

Professional ratings
Review scores
Source	Rating
AllMusic	3.5/5 stars

Different Tacos is a 1996 compilation album by Texas-based blues rock band The Fabulous Thunderbirds. The album features a collection of rarities, B-sides and outtakes from their first four albums. It also contains live tracks from various UK tours.

== Track listing ==
1. "Can't Tear It Up Enuff" (Kim Wilson) – 2:45
2. "You're Humbuggin' Me" (Miller, Morgan) – 2:41
3. "My Babe" (Ron Holden) – 2:24
4. "Feelin' Good" (Herman Parker) – 5:20
5. "Found a New Love" (Wilson) – 3:16
6. "Introduction of Band by C-Boy at Bottom Line, Austin" – 0:20
7. "Bad Boy" (Eddie Taylor) – 3:12
8. "Scratch My Back" (James Moore) – 5:07
9. "She's Tuff" (Jerry McCain) – 3:23
10. "Full-Time Lover" (Jones, Frank Scott) – 4:30
11. "Introduction of Guest Musicians by Kim Wilson" – 0:35
12. "Made in the Shade" – 2:41
13. "Crawl" (Shuler, Victorian) – 2:47
14. "I Hear You Knockin'" (Miller) – 2:42
15. "Mathilda" (George Khoury, Huey Thierry) – 3:22
16. "Someday" – 2:14
17. "Wait on Time" (Wilson) – 3:10
18. "I Got Eyes" (Johnny "Guitar" Watson) – 3:05
19. "Things I Forgot to Do" (Wilson) – 3:02
20. "Look Whatcha Done" (Magic Sam) – 2:18
21. "Please Don't Lie to Me" (Wilson) – 2:08
22. "Pocket Rocket" (Wilson) – 4:46

== Personnel ==
- Denny Bruce – producer
- Kim Wilson – vocals
- Jimmie Vaughan – guitar
- Keith Ferguson – bass
- Mike Buck – drums, tracks 4, 17, and 22
- Fran Christina – drums, all other tracks
- Bill Campbell – rhythm guitar
- Al Copley – piano
- Billy Cross – photography
- Joe Gastwirt – mastering
- Heather Harris – design, photography
- Doug James – baritone saxophone
- Kim King – engineer
- Johnny Nicholas – piano, backing vocals
- Greg Piccolo – tenor saxophone
