= Tough Enough =

Tough Enough may refer to:

- Tough Enough (1983 film), film starring Dennis Quaid
- Tough Enough (2006 film) (Knallhart), German film
- WWE Tough Enough, professional wrestling reality TV show
- "Tough Enough" (song), song by Vanilla Ninja from Traces of Sadness

== See also ==
- Tuff Enuff
  - "Tuff Enuff" (song)
- Tuff E Nuff
