= Roll of the Dice =

Studio album by The Fabulous Thunderbirds
- Released: August 1, 1995
- Genres: Blues rock, Texas blues
- Length: 50:12
- Label: Private Music
- Producer: Danny Kortchmar

The Fabulous Thunderbirds chronology
| Walk That Walk, Talk That Talk (1991) | Roll of the Dice (1995) | Different Tacos (1996) |

Professional ratings
Review scores
| Source | Rating |
|---|---|
| AllMusic | 3/5 stars |
| The Penguin Guide to Blues Recordings | 2.5/4 stars |

Roll of the Dice is a 1995 studio album by Texas-based blues rock band The Fabulous Thunderbirds, their second without Jimmie Vaughan.

== Track listing ==
1. "Roll of the Dice" (Kim Wilson, Danny Kortchmar)
2. "Too Many Irons in the Fire" (Kortchmar, Stan Lynch)
3. "How Do I Get You Back?" (Kortchmar, Tonio K)
4. "Here Comes the Night" (Bert Berns)
5. "Takin' It Too Easy" (Wilson, Rick Giles)
6. "I Don't Wanna Be the One" (Wilson, Jerry Williams)
7. "Mean Love" (Wilson, Kortchmar)
8. "I Can't Win" (Wilson, Kortchmar, Steve Jordan)
9. "Memory from Hell" (Giles, Chuck Jones)
10. "Lookin' Forward to Lookin' Back" (Wilson, Giles, Jones)
11. "Do as I Say" (Wilson, Jones)
12. "Zip A Dee Do Dah" (Allie Wrubel, Ray Gilbert)

== Personnel ==
=== Musicians ===
- Kim Wilson – vocals, harmonica
- David Grissom – guitar
- Kid Ramos – guitar
- Danny Kortchmar – rhythm guitar
- Harvey Brooks – bass
- Fran Christina – drums
- Gene Taylor – keyboards
- Steve Jordan – drums, percussion, bass
- Leon Pendarvis – Hammond B3 organ
- Ron Russell – organ
- Babi Floyd – backing vocals

=== Technical ===
- George Cowan – recording
- Niko Bolas – mixing
