= Girls Go Wild =

Studio album by the Fabulous Thunderbirds
- Released: October 29, 1979
- Recorded: May 1979
- Studio: Sumet-Bernet Sound Studios, Dallas, Texas
- Genre: Blues
- Length: 35:02
- Label: Takoma; Chrysalis
- Producer: Denny Bruce

The Fabulous Thunderbirds chronology
Girls Go Wild (1979)	What's the Word (1980)

Professional ratings
Review scores
Source	Rating
AllMusic	4.5/5 stars
The Austin Chronicle	4/5 stars
The Encyclopedia of Popular Music	4/5 stars
The Penguin Guide to Blues Recordings	3/4 stars
The Rolling Stone Album Guide	3.5/5 stars
DownBeat	4/5 stars

Girls Go Wild is the alternate (and incorrect) title of the 1979 debut studio album by the Texas-based blues rock band the Fabulous Thunderbirds. The album was an eponymous release (the record label and the jacket spine have only the band's name), but due to the prominence of the words "Girls Go Wild" on the cover it has often been referred to by that name. The album was reissued via Benchmark Recordings in 2000.

== Reception ==
The Cleveland Scene wrote that the album "generated an excitement among many blues fans on a par with that brought on by the first couple of Paul Butterfield albums more than a decade before."

DownBeat assigned the album 4 stars. Reviewer Tim Schneckloth wrote,"The four young Texans display an easy, natural control of the idiom, with no sense of artificial straining for "authenticity" . . . The key is naturalness, and the Fabulous Thunderbirds sure have it; they’re good, and they don’t have to prove it. If this album whets your appetite, try to catch the band live."

== Track listing ==
All tracks composed by Kim Wilson except where indicated:

1. "Wait on Time" – 3:03
2. "Scratch My Back" (James Moore AKA Slim Harpo) – 3:52
3. "Rich Woman" (Dorothy LaBostrie, McKinley "Li'l" Millet) – 3:28
4. "Full-Time Lover" (Frankie Lee, Frank Scott) – 4:43
5. "Pocket Rocket" – 3:27
6. "She's Tuff" (Jerry "Boogie" McCain) – 2:59
7. "Marked Deck" (Jimmy Mullins, Johnny Vincent) – 2:41
8. "Walkin' to My Baby" – 2:25
9. "Rock with Me" – 2:38
10. "C-Boy's Blues" (Wilson, Jimmie Vaughan, Keith Ferguson, Mike Buck) – 2:58
11. "Let Me In" – 2:35

== Bonus tracks on some editions ==
1. "Look Whatcha Done" (Samuel Maghett) – 2:17
2. "Please Don't Lie to Me" – 2:08
3. "Things I Forgot to Do" (Kim Wilson, Guitar Slim) – 3:00

== Personnel ==
Musicians

- Kim Wilson – vocals, harmonica
- Jimmie Vaughan – guitar
- Keith Ferguson – bass
- Mike Buck – drums

Technical

- Denny Bruce – producer
- Bob Sullivan – engineer
