= Powerful Stuff =

Studio album by the Fabulous Thunderbirds
- Released: 1989
- Recorded: November 1988–January 1989
- Studio: Ardent, Memphis, Tennessee; Alpha Sound, Memphis, Tennessee
- Genre: Blues rock, Texas blues
- Length: 42:26
- Label: CBS Associated
- Producer: Terry Manning

The Fabulous Thunderbirds chronology
Hot Number (1987)	Powerful Stuff (1989)	Walk That Walk, Talk That Talk (1991)

Professional ratings
Review scores
Source	Rating
AllMusic	2/5 stars
Hi-Fi News & Record Review	A:1
The Penguin Guide to Blues Recordings	2/4 stars

Powerful Stuff is a 1989 studio album by Texas based blues rock band the Fabulous Thunderbirds. It was recorded in Memphis and produced by Terry Manning. It was the last studio album to feature Jimmie Vaughan before leaving for a solo career. The track "Powerful Stuff" achieved mainstream success and was featured in Touchstone Pictures' 1988 hit film Cocktail. It was the first single released from the Cocktail soundtrack album, which reached number one on the Billboard Charts and sold over 19 million copies worldwide.

== Track listing ==
1. "Rock This Place" (Jerry Lynn Williams) - 4:22
2. "Knock Yourself Out" (David Porter, Garry Goin, Ronald Hill, Kim Wilson) - 4:32
3. "Mistake Number 1" (David Porter, T. Thomas) - 4:53
4. "One Night Stand" (Jerry Lynn Williams) - 4:59
5. "Emergency" (Kim Wilson) - 3:35
6. "Powerful Stuff" (Michael Henderson, R.S. Field, Wally Wilson) - 4:38
7. "Close Together" (Jerry Lynn Williams) - 5:18
8. "Now Loosen Up Baby" (Isaac Hayes, David Porter) - 3:35
9. "She's Hot" (Kim Wilson) - 3:22
10. "Rainin' in My Heart" (James Moore, Jerry West) - 3:41

== Personnel ==
The Fabulous Thunderbirds

- Kim Wilson - vocals, harmonica
- Jimmie Vaughan - guitar
- Preston Hubbard - electric and acoustic bass
- Fran Christina - drums

with:

- Jimi Jamison, Terry Manning, William C. Brown III - additional backing vocals
