= Tuff Enuff =

Studio album by the Fabulous Thunderbirds
- Released: January 1986
- Recorded: 1985
- Genres: Blues rock, Texas blues
- Length: 32:26
- Label: CBS Associated Labels
- Producer: Dave Edmunds

The Fabulous Thunderbirds chronology
T-Bird Rhythm (1982)	Tuff Enuff (1986)	Hot Number (1987)

Singles from Tuff Enuff
- 1. "Tuff Enuff" Released: 1986; 2. "Wrap It Up" Released: 1986

Professional ratings
Review scores
Source	Rating
AllMusic	3/5 stars
Kerrang!	5/5 stars
The Penguin Guide to Blues Recordings	3/4 stars

Tuff Enuff is a 1986 studio album by Texas-based blues rock band the Fabulous Thunderbirds, which pointed the band in a more mainstream direction. The single "Tuff Enuff" was featured in the films Gung Ho and Tough Guys, as was the follow-up single "Wrap It Up". It has also been played a number of times on the sitcom Married... with Children. "Tuff Enuff" remains the band's only Top 40 hit, peaking at No. 10 on the Billboard Hot 100.

== Track listing ==
1. "Tuff Enuff" (Kim Wilson) - 3:22
2. "Tell Me" (Eddie Shuler, Sidney Simien) - 2:43
3. "Look at That, Look at That" (Wilson, Fran Christina, Preston Hubbard, Jimmie Vaughan) - 3:25
4. "Two Time My Lovin'" (Wilson) - 3:41
5. "Amnesia" (Wilson) - 3:45
6. "Wrap It Up" (Isaac Hayes, David Porter) - 2:42
7. "True Love" (Wilson) - 3:08
8. "Why Get Up" (Bill Carter, Ruth Ellen Ellsworth) - 3:48
9. "I Don't Care" (Wilson) - 2:49
10. "Down at Antones" (instrumental) (Wilson, Christina, Hubbard, Vaughan) - 3:03

== Personnel ==
The Fabulous Thunderbirds

- Kim Wilson - vocals, harmonica
- Jimmie Vaughan - guitar, steel guitar, bass, vocals
- Preston Hubbard - electric and acoustic bass, vocals
- Fran Christina - drums, vocals

with:

- Al Copley - keyboards
- Chuck Leavell - keyboards on "Look at That, Look at That"
- Geraint Watkins - piano, accordion on "Amnesia"
- Cesar Rosas, David Hidalgo - vocals on "Two Time My Lovin'"

Album Design-Spencer Drate, Judith Salavetz; Front cover artwork-Dan Youngblood
