= Mike Buck =

Mike Buck may refer to:

- Mike Buck (musician) (born 1952), American drummer and record shop owner
- Mike Buck (American football) (born 1967), American football quarterback
