= The LeRoi Brothers =

American rock band

The LeRoi Brothers are an American rock band from Austin, Texas.

The group was founded in 1981 by Mike Buck (also of The Fabulous Thunderbirds), Don Leady, Steve Doerr, and Alex Napier. The group was a long-running Austin bar band, but achieved national success with the album Open All Night, which reached number 181 on the Billboard 200 in 1987.

Former member Alex Napier died on February 3, 2011, in Desoto, Texas from liver cancer, aged 59.

On March 12, 2014, The LeRoi Brothers were inducted into the Austin Music Hall of Fame.

Former member Evan Johns died from complications of liver disease on March 11, 2017, at the age of 60 in Austin, Texas.

== Members ==
- Mike Buck – drums
- Don Leady – guitar, vocals
- Steve Doerr – guitar, vocals
- Alex Napier – bass
- Joe Doerr – vocals
- Jackie Newhouse – bass
- Sarah Brown – bass
- Evan Johns – guitar
- Rick "Casper" Rawls – guitar
- Pat Collins – bass
- Miller "Speedy" Sparks – bass
- Eve Monsees – guitar

== Discography ==
- Moon Twist [4 songs/7-inch EP] (Amazing, 1981)
- Check This Action (Amazing; Jungle, 1983; CD reissue: Rounder, 1994) with special guest Keith Ferguson on bass
- Forget About the Danger Think of the Fun [6 songs/12-inch EP] (Columbia, 1984)
- Lucky Lucky Me (Demon; New Rose; Profile, 1985) (released as Protection From Enemies in the UK)
- The LeRoi Brothers [5 songs/12-inch EP] (New Rose, 1985)
- Open All Night (Profile, 1986)
- Viva LeRoi (New Rose, 1989)
- Rhythm and Booze (New Rose, 1990)
- Crown Royale (Rounder, 1992) compilation of Viva LeRoi and Rhythm and Booze
- Kings of the Catnap (Rounder, 2000)
- Check This Action (Deluxe Reissue) (Jungle, 2017) includes the Moon Twist EP, plus two previously unreleased tracks
- "Lonesome Train"/"Big Leg Woman" [45rpm 7-inch single] (Serpent, 2024)
