= Struck Down (The Fabulous Thunderbirds album) =

2024 studio album by The Fabulous Thunderbirds

Studio album by The Fabulous Thunderbirds
- Released: June 28, 2024
- Genre: Blues
- Label: Stony Plain Records
- Producer: Kim Wilson, Steve Strongman, Glen Parrish

The Fabulous Thunderbirds chronology
Strong Like That (2016)	Struck Down (2024)

Struck Down is an album by the Fabulous Thunderbirds. It was released on June 28, 2024.

Struck Down was nominated for a Grammy Award for Best Traditional Blues Album.

== Track listing ==
All tracks written by Steve Strongman and Kim Wilson.

No.	Title	Featured Artist	Length
1.	"Struck Down by the Blues"	Steve Strongman	3:41
2.	"Don't Make No Sense"	Terrance Simien	2:47
3.	"Payback Time"	Billy Gibbons	3:35
4.	"Nothing in Rambling"	Bonnie Raitt; Keb' Mo'; Taj Mahal; Mick Fleetwood	3:55
5.	"Won't Give Up"		3:34
6.	"The Hard Way"		4:06
7.	"Whatcha Do to Me"	Elvin Bishop	3:09
8.	"I've Got Eyes"		4:07
9.	"That's Cold"		2:18
10.	"Sideline"		4:03

== Personnel ==
The Fabulous Thunderbirds

- Kim Wilson – vocals, harmonica
- Johnny Moeller – guitar
- Bob Welsh – piano, keyboards, guitar
- Steven Kirsty – bass, saxophone
- Rudy Albin Petschauer – drums, percussion

Additional musicians

- Steve Strongman – guitars on all tracks except "That's Cold" and "I Won't Give Up"
- Terrance Simien – accordion and washboard on "Don't Make No Sense"
- Bonnie Raitt – vocals and acoustic guitar on "Nothing in Rambling"
- Keb' Mo' – vocals and slide guitar on "Nothing in Rambling"
- Taj Mahal – vocals on "Nothing in Rambling"
- Mick Fleetwood – drums and percussion on "Nothing in Rambling"
- Billy Gibbons – guitar and background vocals on "Payback Time"
- Elvin Bishop – guitar on "Whatcha Do to Me"
- Dean Shott – guitar on "The Hard Way"
- Chris Ayries – background vocals on "Sideline"
- Rob Szabo – percussion

Production

- Produced by Kim Wilson, Steve Strongman, Glen Parrish
- Executive producer: Geoff Kulawick
- Mixing: Shelly Yukas
- Engineering: Tom Askin, Dan Meyers
- Additional mixing: Tim Lynch, Bob Boyer
