= Walk That Walk, Talk That Talk =

Studio album by the Fabulous Thunderbirds
- Released: December 1991
- Genres: Blues rock, Texas blues
- Label: Epic Associated
- Producer: Steve Jordan

The Fabulous Thunderbirds chronology
Powerful Stuff (1989)	Walk That Walk, Talk That Talk (1991)	Roll of the Dice (1995)

Professional ratings
Review scores
Source	Rating
AllMusic	2.5/5 stars
The Penguin Guide to Blues Recordings	3/4 stars

Walk That Walk, Talk That Talk is a 1991 studio album by Texas based blues rock band the Fabulous Thunderbirds and the first without guitarist Jimmie Vaughan. He was replaced by Duke Robillard and Kid Bangham for the recording. The album marks a return to the straightforward blues-rock sound of their early material, abandoning the overly commercial production of their previous three albums.

== Track listing ==
All tracks composed by Kim Wilson; except where indicated.

No.	Title	Writer(s)	Length
1.	"Twist of the Knife"	Chuck Jones; Rick Giles; Kim Wilson	4:24
2.	"Ain't That a Lot of Love"	Deanie Parker; Homer Banks	3:46
3.	"Work Together"		6:28
4.	"Born to Love You"	Duke Robillard	3:59
5.	"Need Somebody to Love"	Jerry Lynn Williams; Kim Wilson	5:09
6.	"Feelin' Good"	Herman "Junior" Parker	5:27
7.	"Roller Coaster"		4:21
8.	"Sweet Thang"		3:16
9.	"Can't Stop Rockin'"		4:56
10.	"When I Get Home"	Kim Wilson; Rick Giles	4:49
11.	"Paralyzed"		3:54
Total length:			50:29

== Personnel ==
- Kim Wilson - vocals, harmonica
- Duke Robillard - guitar, vocals
- Kid Bangham - guitar
- Steve Jordan - guitar, percussion, backing vocals
- Preston Hubbard - electric and upright bass
- Austin de Lone - keyboards
- Fran Christina - drums, percussion
