= Mike Buck (musician) =

American drummer (born 1952)

- Born: June 17, 1952 (age 74); Fort Worth, Texas, U.S.
- Origin: Austin, Texas, U.S.
- Genres: Blues rock, roots rock, rock and roll, Texas blues, R&B, garage
- Instrument: Drums

Mike Buck (born June 17, 1952) is an American, Austin, Texas-based drummer, and co-owner of Antone's Record Shop located in downtown Austin.

== Career ==
Born and raised in Fort Worth, Texas, Buck began playing drums at the age of 12. By his mid teens, he was playing in various Fort Worth-area clubs with artists such Robert Ealey, Ray Sharpe, Johnny Carroll, and Bubbles Cash.

Buck moved to Austin in the mid-1970s and joined the blues rock group the Fabulous Thunderbirds, along with Keith Ferguson, Jimmie Vaughan, and Kim Wilson. He appeared on the Thunderbirds' first two albums, Girls Go Wild (1979) and What's the Word (1980).

In 1981, he left the Thunderbirds to form the LeRoi Brothers with guitarists Steve Doerr and Don Leady. In addition to continuing to play with the LeRoi Brothers, Buck has performed and recorded with numerous notable artists over the years, including Roky Erickson, Screamin' Jay Hawkins (Jalacy Hawkins), Roy Head, Lazy Lester (Leslie Johnson), Toni Price, Ted Roddy, and Doug Sahm.

In 1985, Buck appeared on the album Trash, Twang And Thunder, which featured various artists known collectively as 'Big Guitars From Texas'. The album track, "Guitar Army" ‒ featuring Buck, Frankie Camaro, Keith Ferguson, Denny Freeman, Evan Johns, and Jesse Taylor ‒ garnered a 1986 Grammy Award nomination for Best Rock Instrumental Performance.

In 2001, Buck with Eve Monsees, Speedy Sparks, and Grady Pinkerton formed 'Eve and the Exiles'. After the group's self-titled 2004 release and several lineup changes, the Exiles released their 2008 album entitled Blow Your Mind.

In May 2009, Buck, Monsees, and Forrest Coppock purchased the central Austin record store 'Antone's Record Shop' from then-current owner Susan Antone (sister of the store's original owner, Clifford Antone).

In September 2010, Buck and Monsees were married in New Orleans.

== Discography ==
- Big Guitars From Texas - Trash, Twang & Thunder
- Big Guitars From Texas - That's Cool, That's Trash
- Johnny Carroll - Texabilly
- Eugene Chadbourne & Evan Johns - Terror Has Some Strange Kinfolk
- Jim Colgrove (and the Juke Jumpers) - Panther City Blues
- Robert Ealey & The Five Careless Lovers - Live At The New Bluebird Nightclub
- Tex Edwards & Out On Parole - Pardon Me, I've Got Someone To Kill
- Eve Monsees and the Exiles - Eve Monsees and The Exiles
- Eve [Monsees] and the Exiles - Blow Your Mind
- Eve Monsees and the Exiles - You Know She Did
- Fabulous Thunderbirds - Girls Go Wild
- Fabulous Thunderbirds - What's the Word
- Fabulous Thunderbirds - Different Tacos
- Fabulous Thunderbirds - Thunderbirds Tacos Deluxe
- James Hinkle - Straight Ahead Blues?
- Long John Hunter - Lone Star Shootout
- Lazy Lester - All Over You
- Lazy Lester - Blues Stop Knockin'
- Legendary Stardust Cowboy - Rocket To Stardom (w/ LeRoi Bros.)
- LeRoi Brothers - Check This Action
- LeRoi Brothers - Forget About The Danger
- LeRoi Brothers - Lucky Lucky Me
- LeRoi Brothers - Open All Night
- LeRoi Brothers - Viva LeRoi
- LeRoi Brothers - Rhythm and Booze
- LeRoi Brothers - Kings Of The Catnap
- John "Juke" Logan - The Truth Will Rock You
- Lord High Fixers - The Beginning Of The End...The End Of The Beginning
- Mamou - Mamou
- Naughty Ones - I Dig Your Voodoo
- Toni Price - Swim Away
- Toni Price - Hey
- Toni Price - Low Down And Up
- Johnny Reno & His Sax Maniacs - Born To Blow
- Dick Rivers - Holly Days In Austin
- Frank Robinson & Guitar Curtis - Deep East Texas Blues
- South Filthy - Crackin' Up
- Sweetman - Austin Backalley Blue
- Ted & The Tall Tops - Ted & The Tall Tops
- Teisco Del Rey - The Many Moods Of...
- Teisco Del Rey - ...Plays Music For Lovers
- Texas Tornados - Texas Tornados
- Texas Tornados - Best Of...
- Three Balls Of Fire - The Best Of The Balls 1988-2000
- Henry Vestine - Guitar Gangster
- J.J. Vicars - Sci-Fi Diner
- V/A - Blues Guitar Women (w/ Eve Monsees)
- V/A - Delicacy & Nourishment Vol.3 (w/ Evan Johns)
- V/A - Everyday Is A Holly Day: A Tribute To Buddy Holly (w/ Speedy Sparks, LeRoi Bros.)
- V/A - Forever Gene Vincent (w/ Johnny Carroll)
- V/A - Happy Birthday Buck: A Texas Salute To Buck Owens (w/ LeRoi Bros.)
- V/A - Live At The Continental Club (w/ Leroi Bros.)
- V/A - Live At The Kremlin (w/ LeRoi Bros.)
- V/A - More Songs Of Route 66 (w/ LeRoi Bros.)
- V/A - Root Damage (w/ T. Tex Edwards, South Filthy)
- V/A - Texas Harmonica Rumble (w/ Lazy Lester)
- V/A - Texas Harmonica Rumble Vol. 2 (w/ Ted & The Tall Tops, Mark Hummel, Jumpin' Johnny Sansone)
- V/A - Texas Northside Kings (w/ Eve Monsees)
- V/A - Virus 100- Tribute To The Dead Kennedys (w/ Evan Johns)
- V/A - Turban Renewal- A Tribute To Sam The Sham (w/ Homer Henderson, Naughty Ones, Little Richard Elizondo)

== See also ==
- List of drummers
