= Tuff Enuff (song) =

Single by the Fabulous Thunderbirds

from the album Tuff Enuff
- B-side: "Look at That, Look at That"
- Released: 1986
- Recorded: 1985
- Genre: Blues rock
- Length: 3:21
- Label: CBS; Epic Associated
- Songwriter: Kim Wilson
- Producer: Dave Edmunds

The Fabulous Thunderbirds singles chronology
"Tuff Enuff" (1986)	"Wrap It Up" (1986)

"Tuff Enuff" is a song by the blues rock band the Fabulous Thunderbirds. It was written by Kim Wilson. The song was included on the album Tuff Enuff, produced by Dave Edmunds. Released as a single in 1986, "Tuff Enuff" peaked at number 10 on the Billboard Hot 100 and number 4 on Billboard Mainstream Rock Tracks; it reached the top 20 in other countries and number 83 in Australia. It was the band's first single and has since become their signature song. It was ranked number 96 on VH1's "100 Greatest One Hit Wonders of the 80s"—although "Wrap It Up" was a minor hit.

== Music video ==
The music video directed by Harry Lake, and features the band performing on a sound stage, accompanied by dancing female construction workers.

== Personnel ==
- Kim Wilson – lead vocals
- Jimmie Vaughan – guitars
- Preston Hubbard – bass
- Fran Christina – drums
- Al Copley – keyboards

== Critical reception ==
The Michigan Daily called the song "a real rocker." The Reading Eagle called it "an unforgettable R&B scorcher."

== Cover versions ==
Wynonna Judd recorded the song for her 2000 album, New Day Dawning. In 2015, the song was performed by Foo Fighters on Austin City Limits, with guest artists Gary Clark Jr. and former Thunderbird Jimmie Vaughan.

== In popular culture ==
"Tuff Enuff" has been used in many movies, such as Gung Ho, The Naked Cage, The Money Pit, Hannah and Her Sisters, the opening credits of Ruthless People, Tough Guys, Ricochet, the 2007 film The Game Plan, and the closing credits of the 1986 film Wise Guys. It also appeared in the TV series Married... with Children and in season 3 of Providence. "Tuff Enuff" and the Fabulous Thunderbirds are mentioned on American Dad!, in the episode "Family Affair", in season 5.
