= Light of Day =

1987 film by Paul Schrader

- Theatrical release poster
- Directed by: Paul Schrader
- Written by: Paul Schrader
- Produced by: Keith Barish; Rob Cohen
- Starring: Michael J. Fox; Gena Rowlands; Joan Jett; Michael McKean; Jason Miller
- Cinematography: John Bailey
- Edited by: Jacqueline Cambas; Jill Savitt
- Music by: Thomas Newman
- Production companies: Taft Entertainment Pictures; Keith Barish Productions; Home Box Office
- Distributed by: Tri-Star Pictures
- Release date: February 6, 1987
- Running time: 107 minutes
- Country: United States
- Language: English
- Box office: $10.5 million

Light of Day is a 1987 American musical drama film starring Michael J. Fox, Gena Rowlands and Joan Jett in her film debut. It was written and directed by Paul Schrader. The original music score was composed by Thomas Newman and the cinematography is by John Bailey.

== Plot ==
Siblings Patti and Joe Rasnick perform in a rock band, the Barbusters, based in Cleveland, Ohio. As a single mother, Patti is estranged from her religious parents and struggles to provide for her son, Benji. She has never revealed the identity of Benji's father. Joe works at a manufacturing plant to help support his sister and nephew.

Prior to a band performance, Patti breaks into a home and steals a set of tools to pay for a Peavey mixing board, arriving just in time to start the set. At work the next day, Joe is confronted by his coworker Smittie, whose brother-in-law was the target of the burglary, demanding payment. Joe agrees to pay the $600 on his sister's behalf, asking his mother, Jeanette, for a loan. She reluctantly agrees, concerned about Joe covering for Patti's numerous past mistakes.

On repaying Smittie, Joe finds that he has been laid off. He and Patti agree that their best option is to take The Barbusters on a tour. They depart, taking Benji with them. The tour appears to be successful, but struggling with finances, each earns only $57 per member after a week of touring. In spite of this, Patti wishes to thank the band with steaks she claims to have been saving up for, but which Joe saw her shoplifting earlier. Joe confronts her about the theft, and Patti storms off to get ready for a show.

While she's gone, Joe returns to their parents' home with Benji. Patti arrives and is heavily criticized by Jeanette for neglecting her son while on tour and pointing out her many failures. Joe intervenes, taking Patti to the basement to cool down. With a sense of desperation, she details her desire to tighten up the band and take it to a new level, which he is skeptical can happen.

Returning from a Fabulous Thunderbirds concert, Joe finds Patti excited to audition for The Hunzz, a local metal band. He has no interest in joining The Hunzz, and she sees Joe's concern for the stability of their family as opposition to Patti's life. A brief fight ensues, but Benji appears, crying. Joe takes Benji to his room, and Patti leaves to audition for The Hunzz.

The Barbusters go their separate ways, with Joe returning to his manufacturing job and caring for Benji as a surrogate father. Issues with Jeanette's memory become apparent when she forgets that they own a functional dishwasher. Joe's father, Benjamin, confirms that her memory is fading, but he doesn't bring it up for fear of upsetting her.

While talking to Bu at work soon after, Joe gets a call that his mother is in the hospital. At the hospital, Jeanette has been undergoing tests and appears confused. The results of a biopsy are made known to Joe and his father, indicating that she suffers from ovarian cancer. Jeanette wonders where Patti is, and Joe believes he can find her.

Joe goes to a Hunzz show to find Patti and takes her home. After a night out at a bar, Patti, Joe, and the Barbusters reconcile. Later, at the hospital, Jeanette requests to speak with Patti alone, and they reconcile as she is on her deathbed. Patti confesses that Reverend Ansley is Benji's father. Jeanette expresses a wish for Benjamin to remarry, and for Patti to join her in Heaven, and Patti agrees to both.

Soon after, Jeanette passes away. At the viewing for her funeral, Patti is absent. Later that night, The Barbusters are expected to play a reunion show, but Bu suspects Patti will not make it to that, either. Joe finds her at an arcade, confronts her about her absences, and declares how much he used to look up to her.

Patti leaves the arcade to go to the funeral home and embraces her father. Meanwhile, The Barbusters are setting up, getting ready to start their set without Patti. Surprising everyone, she arrives in time for the first chorus of "Light of Day," and the band is reunited.

== Cast ==
- Michael J. Fox as Joe Rasnick
- Joan Jett as Patti Rasnick
- Gena Rowlands as Jeanette Rasnick
- Michael McKean as Bu Montgomery
- Thomas G. Waites as Smittie
- Cherry Jones as Cindy Montgomery
- Michael Dolan as Gene Bodine
- Paul J. Harkins as Billy Tettore
- Billy L. Sullivan as Benji Rasnick
- Jason Miller as Benjamin Rasnick
- Tom Irwin as Reverend Ansley
- Michael Rooker as Oogie
- 1984 Miss Teen USA Cherise Haugen as Crystal
- Jerry Gideon as Sean
- Yvette Heyden as Laurie
- Del Close as Dr. Natterson
- Ray Bradford as Dr. Gould

A young Trent Reznor appears with Exotic Birds bandmate Frank Vale and former Generators singer/bassist Mark Addison as fictional band the Problems. Local teen band the Pelicans appears as the Bubblegummers. The Fabulous Thunderbirds perform in the movie as themselves. Ron Dean has a cameo as one of the attendees of Patti's funeral home, and Alan Poul appears as a cashier.

== Production ==
The film was shot on location in various places in Illinois, including Chicago, Maywood, Berwyn, Blue Island, Lincolnwood, Streamwood, as well as Hammond, Indiana, and Cleveland.

The film is best known as the first real attempt by Fox to take on more serious film roles after establishing himself as a comedic star. Light of Day is one of the few projects where Fox has smoked in front of the camera; although a chain smoker, he avoided being photographed with a cigarette out of fear that it would encourage smoking.

Schrader wrote the film with Bruce Springsteen in mind and sent him a copy of the script with the original working title, Born in the USA. Springsteen declined to participate in the movie but used the title for a song he had been writing about a Vietnam veteran. At that point, the film was on hold; it went back into production when Fox agreed to star. To make up for taking the title, Springsteen instead wrote the song "Light of Day" for the film; that became its new title and the Barbusters' signature song. Joan Jett performed the song for the film's soundtrack. Springsteen himself began playing the song live in 1987 and has continued performing it on most of his tours since then.

Schrader has expressed dissatisfaction with Light of Day, particularly its plain visual style: "I had progressed from being a person with a literary vision to a person with a visual vision, and in that film I tried to...suppress my new literacy," and the casting of Joan Jett: "it's a good performance, but...that piece of casting just did not work."

== Reception ==
On the review aggregator website Rotten Tomatoes, 53% of 17 critics' reviews are positive, with an average rating of 5.4/10. Metacritic, which uses a weighted average, assigned the film a score of 55 out of 100, based on 12 critics, indicating "mixed or average" reviews.

In a review for the Chicago Sun-Times, critic Roger Ebert gave the film three-and-a-half out of four stars and called it the "most direct and painful statement" of a theme explored in Schrader's previous films—"wildly different characters with one thing in common: Their pasts keep them imprisoned, and shut them off from happiness in the present." Ebert found Rowlands' acting "powerfully, heartbreakingly effective" and said that Jett matches to Rowlands' inspiration in "the most surprisingly good performance."

Janet Maslin of The New York Times stated "Bruce Springsteen wrote the rousing title song and reportedly took the phrase 'Born in the U.S.A.' from an earlier draft of Mr. Schrader's screenplay. It's possible, even from the finished film, to see what he and Mr. Schrader might share. One of the monologues included on Mr. Springsteen's recent live album describes his boyhood dream of becoming a rock-and-roller and proving something to his family, to himself, to the world; those ambitions are described in terms of musical triumph, not money or fame. Light of Day wants to embody a similar dream, but it pulls its punches. Mr. Schrader may have started out to make a film about the fiercest, most incorruptible stirrings of young talent. But he wound up making a soap opera along the way."

Variety criticized the film's writing, mocking the film's family as "anyfamily USA as written by Eugene O’Neill." The publication was mixed toward the film's casting, writing that while Rowlands did well with the material, Fox was miscast for his character, and "Jett looks the part and even manages to hit the mark from time to time, but for every hit there’s a miss." The magazine also found Patti's obsession with rock-and-roll as an escape mechanism to be "childish and silly."

=== Box office ===
Light of Day grossed $10.5 million at the box office in the United States and Canada.

== Soundtrack ==
Light of Day

Soundtrack album by various artists
- Released: 1987
- Genre: Rock
- Length: 42:04
- Label: Blackheart

Professional ratings
Review scores
Source	Rating
AllMusic	3/5 stars

The soundtrack to the film was released in 1987. As a single, "Light of Day" reached number 33 on the Billboard Hot 100 and received additional album-oriented rock airplay due to the connection of Joan Jett and Bruce Springsteen. The Barbusters is the name of Jett's band in the film.

=== Track listing ===
1. "Light of Day" (Bruce Springsteen) – The Barbusters
2. "This Means War" (Joan Jett, Bob Halligan Jr., Kenny Laguna) – The Barbusters
3. "Twist It Off" (Jimmie Vaughan, Kim Wilson, Fran Christina, Preston Hubbard) – The Fabulous Thunderbirds
4. "Cleveland Rocks" (Ian Hunter) – Ian Hunter
5. "Stay with Me Tonight" (Dave Edmunds, John David) – Dave Edmunds
6. "It's All Coming Down Tonight" (Frankie Miller, Andy Fraser) – The Barbusters
7. "Rude Mood" (Stevie Ray Vaughan) – The Barbusters
8. "Only Lonely" (Jon Bon Jovi, David Bryan) – Bon Jovi
9. "Rabbit's Got the Gun" (Joan Jett, Kenny Laguna) – The Hunzz (credited as Joined Forces on the cassette sleeve)
10. "You Got No Place to Go" (Michael J. Fox, Alan Mark Poul) – Michael J. Fox
11. "Elegy" (Thomas Newman) - Rick Cox, Chas Smith, Jon C. Clarke and Michael Boddicker
