= Keith Ferguson (musician) =

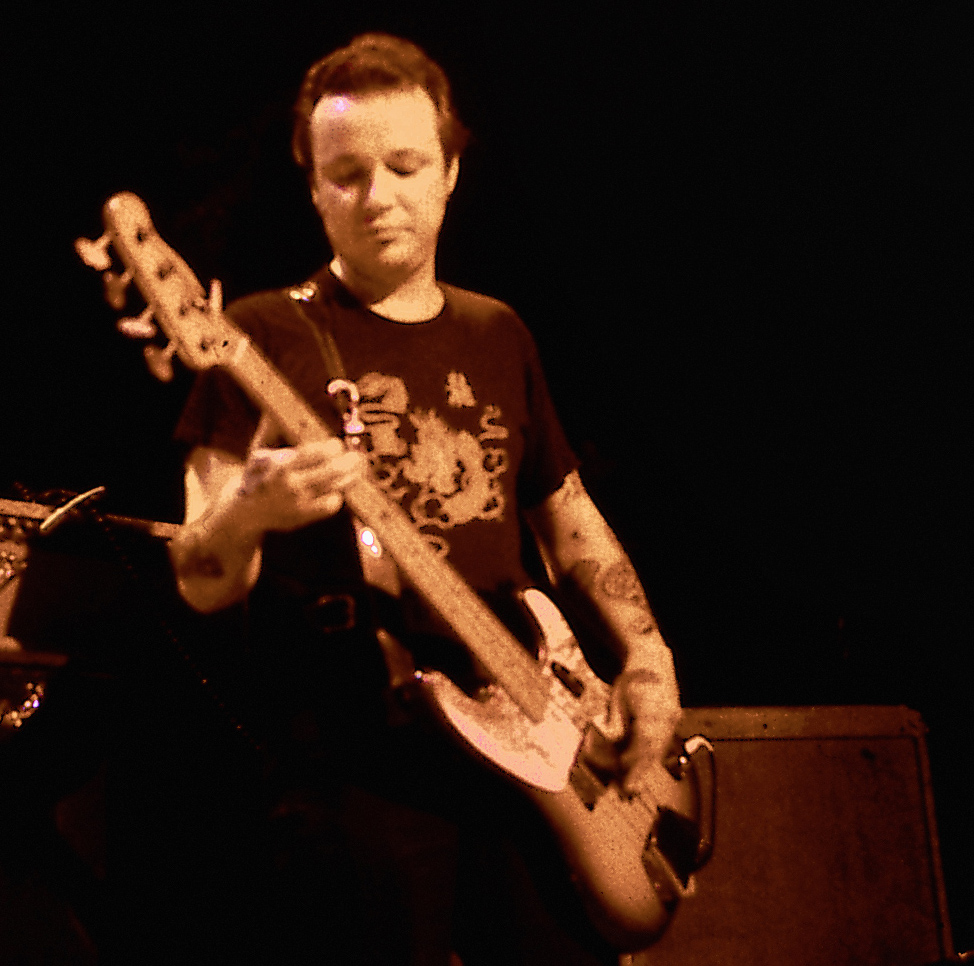
- Ferguson on bass

Background information
- Born: July 23, 1946
- Origin: Houston, Texas, U.S.
- Died: April 29, 1997 (aged 50)
- Genres: Blues, blues-rock rock and roll, R&B
- Occupation: Musician
- Instrument(s): Vocals, bass, guitar
- Years active: 1965–1997
- Labels: Epic, CBS, Chrysalis

Keith Ferguson (July 23, 1946 – April 29, 1997) was an American bass guitarist, best remembered as a member of the blues rock band, The Fabulous Thunderbirds, based in Austin, Texas. Ferguson received several awards for his musicianship.

== Biography ==
Ferguson was born July 23, 1946, and raised in the 'Sexto' – the Sixth Ward of Houston Texas, where he graduated from San Jacinto High School in 1964.

In 1969, he joined "Sunnyland Special", a blues band with Angela Strehli and Lewis Cowdrey. They recorded a 45-rpm single. In 1972 he joined "Black Kangaroo" with guitarist Peter Kaukonen, and toured with them. In 1974 he played in the "Nightcrawlers" together with Stevie Ray Vaughan. Keith also played with Rocky Hill at that time.

In 1976, Ferguson joined The Fabulous Thunderbirds, along with vocalists Lou Ann Barton and Kim Wilson and guitarist Jimmie Vaughan. (Barton left soon after the group began.) The band had an initial large local following, but was unable to maintain a sustained following with commercially positive results. More than five years of being dropped by small and large record labels, with Chrysalis Records being the last in their initial period to drop the band, there was a hiatus of several years, during which time a re-shuffling of band members began to take place, and Ferguson was one of the first to leave.

Ferguson went on to become a member of the Tailgators along with Don Leady and Gary "Mudcat" Smith.

After leaving the Tailgators, Ferguson freelanced with a number of Austin blues bands on the 6 Street Blues Circuit and played with the Excellos and the Solid Senders.

== Death ==
He died of liver failure at the age of 50, on April 29, 1997, due in part to a nearly thirty-year addiction to heroin.

In 2014, a biography was written by author Detlef Schmidt: Keith Ferguson: Texas Blues Bass.

== Discography ==
=== With the Fabulous Thunderbirds ===
- 1979 Girls Go Wild
- 1980 What's the Word
- 1981 Butt Rockin'
- 1982 T-Bird Rhythm
- 1996 Different Tacos
- 2003 Thunderbirds Tacos Deluxe

=== With the Tailgators ===
- 1985 Swamp Rock
- 1986 Mumbo Jumbo
- 1987 Tore Up
- 1988 OK Let's Go!
- 1990 Hide Your Eyes

=== With the Solid Senders ===
- 1994 Everything's Gonna Be Allright
- 1997 Dig My Wheels

=== With other artists ===
- 1983 Havana Moon with Carlos Santana
- 1983 Check This Action with LeRoi Brothers
- 1994 Let The Dogs Run with Mike Morgan and Jim Suhler

== Awards ==
- 1997: Austin Music Hall of Fame Inductee
- 1985: Austin Music Awards, Best Bass Guitar
