= I'm with You Always =

Live album by Mike Bloomfield
- Released: 2008
- Recorded: McCabe's Guitar Shop via Takoma Studios, 1977
- Genre: Blues-rock
- Label: Benchmark Recordings
- Producer: Denny Bruce

Professional ratings
Review scores
Source	Rating
Select	3/5 medals

I'm with You Always is a live album by Mike Bloomfield. It was recorded in 1977 at McCabe's Guitar Shop in Santa Monica. It was originally released as a CD on Demon Records in Europe and finally released in the US in 2008 on the Benchmark Recordings label. Bloomfield shows off his ability to master all forms of blues, from acoustic delta blues, to Chicago electric blues, to full-out blues-rock.

== Track listing ==
All Songs Traditional, unless otherwise noted

1. "Eyesight to the Blind" (Sonny Boy Williamson)
2. "Men's Room"
3. "Frankie and Johnny"
4. "I'm with You Always"
5. "Jockey Blues/Old Folks Boogie"
6. "Some of These Days"
7. "Don't You Lie to Me"
8. "Hymn Time"
9. "Darktown Strutter's Ball"
10. "Stagger Lee"
11. "I'm Glad I'm Jewish" (Mike Bloomfield)
12. "A-Flat Boogaloo"

== Personnel ==
- Mike Bloomfield – vocals, guitar
- Mark Naftalin – piano
- Buell Neidlinger – bass
- Buddy Helm – drums
