= Hot Number =

Studio album by the Fabulous Thunderbirds
- Released: 1987
- Studio: Ardent, Memphis, Tennessee
- Genre: Blues rock
- Length: 38:34
- Label: CBS Associated
- Producer: Dave Edmunds

The Fabulous Thunderbirds chronology
Tuff Enuff (1986)	Hot Number (1987)	Powerful Stuff (1989)

Singles from Hot Number
- 1. "Stand Back" Released: 1987; 2. "How Do You Spell Love?" Released: 1987

Hot Number is a studio album by the American blues rock band the Fabulous Thunderbirds, released in 1987. It peaked at No. 49 on the Billboard 200. The band supported the album by touring with Crosby, Stills & Nash.

== Production ==
Recorded in Memphis, Hot Number was produced by Dave Edmunds. The Memphis Horns contributed to the album. Chuck Leavell played keyboards. "It Comes to Me Naturally" is a cover of the NRBQ song.

== Critical reception ==
Professional ratings
Review scores
Source	Rating
Los Angeles Times	3/4 stars
The Penguin Guide to Blues Recordings	2.5/4 stars
Richmond Times-Dispatch	B+
The Rolling Stone Album Guide	3/5 stars

USA Today opined that "its bluesy orientation unfortunately downplays Jimmy Vaughan's [sic] guitar." The Los Angeles Times determined that "the general familiarity of this record ... will probably appeal more to the band's new fans than to the old faithful." The Kingston Whig-Standard wrote that "Kim Wilson doesn't so much sing with the band as it sings behind him; the result is a less spirited and thinner sound." The Toronto Star deemed the album "sweaty, grimy, bar-room rock 'n' soul." The New York Times tied "Streets of Gold" to 1980s heartland rock songs about socioeconomic issues.

== Track listing ==
All tracks composed by Kim Wilson; except where indicated

1. "Stand Back"
2. "Hot Number"
3. "Wasted Tears"
4. "It Comes to Me Naturally" (Al Anderson)
5. "Love in Common"
6. "How Do You Spell Love?" (Bobby Patterson, Jerry Strickland, Marshall Boxley)
7. "Streets of Gold"
8. "Sofa Circuit"
9. "Don't Bother Trying to Steal Her Love"
10. "It Takes a Big Man to Cry"

== Personnel ==
The Fabulous Thunderbirds

- Kim Wilson - vocals, harmonica
- Jimmie Vaughan - guitar, bass, vocals
- Preston Hubbard - electric and acoustic bass
- Fran Christina - drums, vocals

with:

- Dave Edmunds - guitar, vocals
- Chuck Leavell - keyboards
- Memphis Horns - horns
