= Nick Curran =

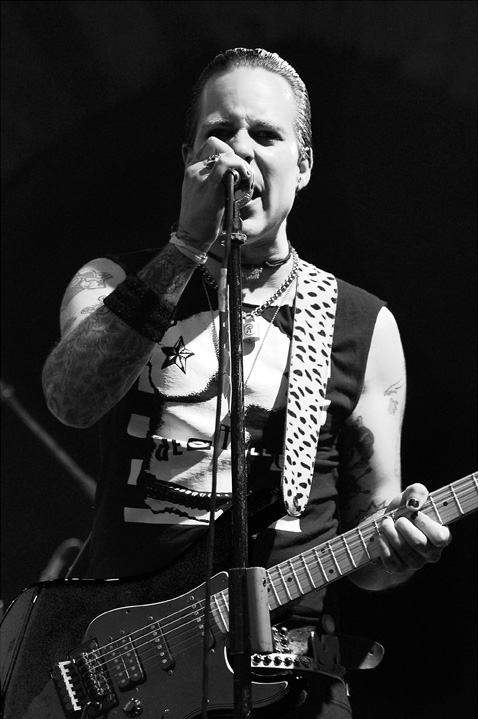
- Curran with the Fabulous Thunderbirds, 2007

Background information
- Also known as: NickyKay
- Born: Nicholas Michael Curran; September 30, 1977; Biddeford, Maine, United States
- Died: October 6, 2012 (aged 35)
- Genres: Texas blues Jump blues/R&B; Rock & roll Rockabilly revival Swing revival Punk rock
- Occupations: Musician, singer-songwriter, record producer
- Instruments: Vocalist, guitar, drums
- Formerly of: Nick Curran & the Nitelifes, Nick Curran & The Lowlifes, The Fabulous Thunderbirds, Ronnie Dawson, Deguello, The Flash Boys

Nick Curran (September 30, 1977 – October 6, 2012) was an American blues/rock and roll singer and guitarist. He has been likened to T-Bone Walker, Little Richard, The Sonics, Doug Sahm, Misfits Eddie Cochran.

== Early life ==
Nick Curran was born in Biddeford, Maine. He began playing drums at the age of 3, showing an amazing ability to keep time even at such a young age. It was a daily ritual for him. He would turn on his radio and play along with the music. His dad, Michael, taught Nick everything he wanted and needed to know with the guitar. Any "lick" that Nick learned early on, he simply asked Michael (Mike) to show him how to do it... and a few hours later, Nick would emerge from his room having learned and practiced it. When asked at a young age why he wanted to play so badly, he replied, "I got the feelin'." He had received no formal lessons for guitar. At age 15, he played guitar and harp in his father's band, Mike Curran and the Tremors, and at the age of 17 played drums, again alongside his father, guitarist Michael Curran, in a band called The Upsetters-based out of Portland, Maine. That same year, he also formed the Rockabilly band Nick Danger and the Sideburners, frequently playing at a number of clubs in the Portland, Maine area. At 18, he auditioned for James Montgomery.

== Career ==
Curran began his professional career at age nineteen, leaving Maine to tour with Ronnie Dawson, "The Blonde Bomber". Although Dawson was primarily a rockabilly musician, many blues and punk fans appreciated his performances. He taught Curran not to get pigeonholed. Curran toured next with Texas rockabilly doyenne Kim Lenz, moving to Dallas to join her backup band the Jaguars, and performing on Lenz's recording, The One And Only. Curran would stay with the Jaguars for two years. He is also featured on Lenz's next CD, It's All True, and toured with her in the summer of 2009.

In 1999, the Texas Jamboree label issued Curran's debut solo recording, Fixin' Your Head. As he would do on all future CDs, Curran used vintage recording equipment to achieve the feel and sound of old 45s and 78s, and the LPs of the 1950s. To support the recording he formed the band, Nick Curran & the Nitelifes. From 2004 to 2007 Curran played with The Fabulous Thunderbirds appearing on their 2005 recording, Painted On. During that time, bassist Ronnie James started the punk band Deguello. In 2008, James and Curran formed The Attitudes with Nick, singing and playing drums standing up, and with guitarist CoffeeBoy Johnson. "This band is like when you and your buddy wanted to have a band in high school and there was no bass player. We just play what ever we wanted to," according to CoffeeBoy Johnson. Their set consisted of covers of The Misfits, The Ramones, Howlin' Wolf, Jimmy Reed, Muddy Waters and Little Richard. "We wanted to give the Black Keys a run for their money."

Curran performed four songs in a scene in the 2008 HBO Series, True Blood, based on The Southern Vampire Mysteries by Charlaine Harris, which explores the co-existence of humans and vampires. After performing a solo show in November 2008, Curran formed the rock ‘n' roll roots band, The Lowlifes, who were critically acclaimed and became a mainstay on Little Steven's Underground Garage, earning three "Coolest Song in the World" titles with tracks from the album, Reform School Girl.

== Death ==
In 2009, Curran was diagnosed with oral cancer. In June 2010, he had been deemed cancer free, but by April 2011 the cancer had returned and he underwent treatment. Curran eventually succumbed to the disease on October 6, 2012, at the age of 35.

== Discography ==
- 2000 – Fixin' Your Head
- 2001 – Nitelife Boogie
- 2003 – Doctor Velvet
- 2004 – Player!
- 2010 – Reform School Girl

Allmusic gave four stars for every album.
