= Forget About the Danger Think of the Fun =

EP by the Leroi Brothers
- Released: 1984
- Genres: Rockabilly, rock 'n' roll
- Label: Columbia
- Producers: Craig Leon, Denny Bruce

The Leroi Brothers chronology
Check This Action (1983)	Forget About the Danger; Think of the Fun (1984)	Lucky Lucky Me (1985)

Forget About the Danger Think of the Fun is an EP by the American band the Leroi Brothers, released in 1984. They supported the EP with a North American tour that included their new guitar player, Evan Johns. Forget About the Danger Think of the Fun was a commercial disappointment and the band's only recording for Columbia Records.

== Production ==
The Leroi Brothers added Joe Doerr on vocals and Jackie Newhouse on bass prior to the recording sessions. The EP was produced by Craig Leon and Denny Bruce. The Leroi Brothers rejected the rockabilly label, as they thought that a hallmark of the genre was the use of acoustic instruments. "Treat Her Right" is a cover of the Roy Head song; it also includes part of the main guitar phrase from the Kinks' "You Really Got Me". "Ain't I'm a Dog" is a version of the Ronnie Self song, which the band had also cut on their debut, Check This Action. "D.W.I." incorporates lyrics from the song "Drinkin' Wine Spo-Dee-O-Dee". "Pretty Little Lights of Town" is about a man who loses his girlfriend to the excitement of a big city.

== Critical reception ==
Professional ratings
Review scores
Source	Rating
The Albuquerque Tribune	C+
AllMusic	2/5 stars
Robert Christgau	B+
The Commercial Appeal	3/4 stars
The Encyclopedia of Popular Music	3/5 stars
Lincoln Journal Star	4/5 stars
MusicHound Country: The Essential Album Guide	3.5/5 stars
Omaha World-Herald	5/5 stars
The Philadelphia Inquirer	5/5 stars
Rolling Stone	4/5 stars

The Philadelphia Inquirer said that the band "know[s] how to update the twangy sound of rockabilly without seeming like hopeless nostalgists". The New York Times noted that the Leroi Brothers' "strong points are its solid beat and the big, expansive voices of its three singers." The Kansas City Star labeled "Eternally Blue" "rockabilly nouveau meets the blues." The Omaha World-Herald concluded that the band "plays a stinging rock 'n' roll along the lines of the Blasters, but somehow faster, tighter and more dangerously."

Newsday considered the two cover songs to be better than the four originals. The Albuquerque Tribune praised the band's abilities but criticized the energy of their performances. Robert Christgau noted the "memorable rockabilly urgency" of "Treat Her Right". The Morning Call stated that the Leroi Brothers' "no-sweat mix of rockabilly, blues, and basic rock 'n' roll has resonance".

== Track listing ==
No.	Title	Length
1.	"Pretty Little Lights of Town"
2.	"Dance with Me Tonight"
3.	"Treat Her Right"
4.	"Eternally Blue"
5.	"Ain't I'm a Dog"
6.	"D.W.I."
