= T-Bird Rhythm =

Studio album by the Fabulous Thunderbirds
- Released: January 11, 1982
- Studios: Third Coast, Austin, Texas
- Genres: Blues rock, Texas blues
- Length: 35:27
- Labels: Chrysalis (Original); Benchmark (Reissue)
- Producer: Nick Lowe

The Fabulous Thunderbirds chronology
Butt Rockin' (1981)	T-Bird Rhythm (1982)	Tuff Enuff (1986)

T-Bird Rhythm is the fourth studio album by Texas-based blues rock band the Fabulous Thunderbirds, released in 1982. The recording contains a mixture of covers and originals. Chrysalis dropped the band following the release of the album.

== Production ==
The album was produced by Nick Lowe. A video was produced for "How Do You Spell Love?"

== Critical reception ==
Professional ratings
Review scores
Source	Rating
AllMusic	4/5 stars
The Austin Chronicle	4/5 stars
Robert Christgau	B+
The Encyclopedia of Popular Music	3/5 stars
The Penguin Guide to Blues Recordings	3/4 stars
The Rolling Stone Album Guide	3/5 stars

Robert Christgau wrote that "both sides open with fetchingly offhand ravers, Kim Wilson works his shoo-fly drawl for gumbo lilt, and the mysterious J. Miller contributes the irresistible 'You're Humbuggin' Me', which had me tearing through my Jimmy Reed records in a fruitless search for the original." The Globe and Mail wrote: "Jimmy Vaughan's [sic] guitar can make the hairs on the back of your neck stand on end, but the real genius of this band is vocalist and harmonica player Kim Wilson." The New York Times called T-Bird Rhythm "a rocking album that generates excitement without sounding like the work of fanatic blues revivalists," writing: "[It] should win this soulful and accomplished band some pop air play and long-overdue recognition. And it's a welcome change for Nick Lowe, whose productions had recently begun sounding a bit like a formula and washed out."

== Track listing ==
All tracks composed by Kim Wilson; except where indicated

1. "Can't Tear It Up Enuff"
2. "How Do You Spell Love?" (Bobby Patterson, Jerry Strickland, Marshall Boxley)
3. "You're Humbuggin' Me" (J.D. Miller, Rocket Morgan)
4. "My Babe'" (Ron Holden)
5. "Neighbor Tend to Your Business" (Huey P Meaux)
6. "The Monkey" (Dave Bartholomew, Pearl King)
7. "Diddy Wah Diddy" (Willie Dixon, Ellas McDaniel)
8. "Lover's Crime"
9. "Poor Boy"
10. "Tell Me" (J.D. Miller)
11. "Gotta Have Some/Just Got Some" (Willie Dixon, William Robert Emerson, Don Talty)

== Personnel ==
The Fabulous Thunderbirds

- Kim Wilson – vocals, harmonica
- Jimmie Vaughan – guitar
- Keith Ferguson – bass
- Fran Christina – drums, backing vocals

Technical

- Colin Fairley – engineer
- Larry Williams – photography
