= The Fabulous Thunderbirds =

American rock band

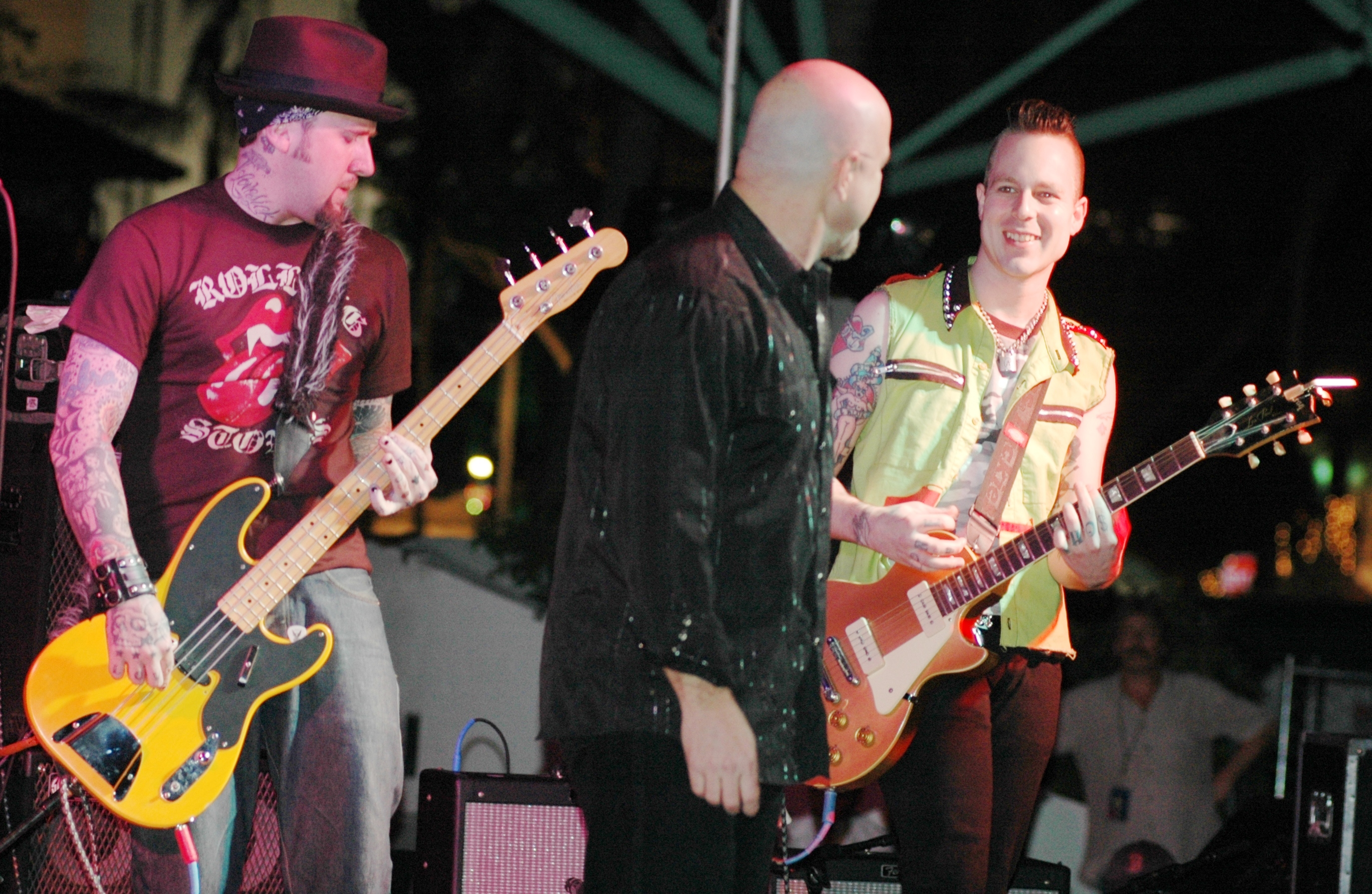
- Riverwalk Blues Festival (February 2006)

Background information
- Origin: Austin, Texas, U.S.
- Genres: Boogie rock; blues rock; Texas blues; Southern rock
- Years active: 1974–present
- Label: CBS Associated
- Members: Kim Wilson; Johnny Moeller; Robert Welsh; Steven Kirsty; Rudy Petschauer
- Past members: Jimmie Vaughan; Keith Ferguson; Mike Buck; Fran Christina; John Melancon; Austin deLone; Preston Hubbard; Duke Robillard; Doug Bangham; Gene Taylor; Kid Ramos; Willie Campbell; Jimi Bott; Richard Innes; Steve Hodges; Ronnie James Weber; Troy Gonyea; Kirk Fletcher; Nick Curran; Randy Bermudes; Jay Moeller; Mike Keller; Wes Watkins; Johnny Moeller
- Website: www.fabulousthunderbirds.com

The Fabulous Thunderbirds is an American rock band formed in 1974. Singer Kim Wilson is the only constant member through the band's entire history. Their 1986 album Tuff Enuff sold over a million copies, and spawned two minor hit singles: the title track and "Wrap It Up".

== Career ==
After performing for several years in the Austin, Texas, blues scene, the band won a recording contract with Takoma/Chrysalis Records and later signed with Epic Records. In 2011, they signed with Severn Records.

Their first two albums were released in 1979 and 1980, with Kim Wilson's lead vocals and harmonica, Jimmie Vaughan as lead guitarist, and Keith Ferguson on bass guitar. Mike Buck was on drums for the first album but left the band and was replaced by Fran Christina on the second. Both albums initially sold through the small number printed (about 3000 units) and are now regarded as significant blues recordings. The Thunderbirds' blues style mixed Texas blues with the harmonica-laced swamp blues sounds of Slim Harpo and Lazy Lester—both of whom the Thunderbirds covered. The band's third album, Butt-Rockin', released in 1981, took the band closer to old rhythm and blues and added additional musicians playing piano and brass.

Although the Fabulous Thunderbirds had become favorites of fellow musicians—opening shows for the likes of the Rolling Stones and Eric Clapton—and had been critically well-received, the band's records did not sell well. Chrysalis dropped the band following the release of T-Bird Rhythm, leaving the band without a contract for four years. While still in limbo, the Fabulous Thunderbirds continued to play concerts across the US. During this time, bassist Keith Ferguson left the band and was replaced by Preston Hubbard, a former member of Roomful of Blues. Also during this time, the band was featured on the 1983 Carlos Santana album Havana Moon. In 1985, the band landed another recording contract with Epic/Associated.

The single "Tuff Enuff" was featured in the 1986 film Gung Ho. It was also featured in the film Tough Guys, as was the follow-up single, "Wrap It Up", which went to number 50 on the Billboard Hot 100 chart. "Tuff Enuff" remains the band's only Top 40 hit, peaking at number 10 on the Billboard Hot 100. The album Tuff Enuff went gold in several countries and was subsequently certified platinum in the United States, with sales of over one million. The band's music was also used in the 1987 movie Hot Pursuit. The Vaughan–Wilson composition "Twist It Off" appears in the 1987 Michael J. Fox and Joan Jett film Light of Day and on the issued soundtrack. The band also appears in the film performing the song live. The Fabulous Thunderbirds' next album, Hot Number, fell off the charts quickly. But following that, their recording of "Powerful Stuff" was a success, based in part on its inclusion in the 1988 film Cocktail.

Jimmie Vaughan left the band in 1990 to record an album with his brother Stevie Ray Vaughan, Family Style. Following Stevie Ray's death in 1990, Jimmie pursued a full-time solo career. The band then embarked on a long series of lineup changes and albums throughout the 1990s. The Fabulous Thunderbirds replaced Vaughan with two guitarists, Duke Robillard and Kid Bangham. Long-time drummer Fran Christina left in 1996 and went on to join with Marcia Ball and later Doug Sahm's Last Real Texas Blues Band. Doug "Kid" Bangham left the band after three years to pursue a solo career and open the Carver School of Music and the Carver Institute of Rock in Carver, Massachusetts.

In the early 1990s, Kim Wilson recorded a pair of solo albums while continuing to tour with the Fabulous Thunderbirds. In 1994, the band recorded its ninth album, Roll of the Dice, which was released on Private Music in 1995. High Water followed in 1997, although this was actually a collaboration between Wilson and studio musicians Steve Jordan and Danny Kortchmar issued under the Fabulous Thunderbirds name.

Former bassist Keith Ferguson died of liver failure on April 29, 1997, at the age of 50.

On the evening of February 16, 2000, the Fabulous Thunderbirds were the first band ever to be broadcast on the Internet using high-definition cameras in what is claimed to be one of the first high-resolution multi-track recordings of a live concert event. The companion CD Live! was released in 2001.; the companion DVD, Invitation Only, presents this event in standard resolution due to limitations of the format.

The band recorded Painted On in 2005, produced by Steve Berlin (of Los Lobos) and featuring Rachel Nagy of the Detroit Cobras on the track "Love Speaks Louder Than Words". Guitarist Nick Curran joined Wilson on vocals for "Two Time Fool".

In 2016, Kim Wilson announced that the Fabulous Thunderbirds lineup for 2016 will be Steve Gomes on bass, Kevin Anker on keyboards, Wes Watkins on drums, with holdover Johnny Moeller on guitar. This lineup plus drummer Rob Stupka recorded the album Strong Like That released in August 2016.

Former bassist Preston Hubbard (born on March 15, 1953, in Providence, Rhode Island) was found dead at his home in St. Louis, Missouri, on August 17, 2016, at the age of 63. He had abused his body for years with drugs and alcohol, but had been clean for years before his death Former keyboardist Gene Taylor, who also played with Canned Heat and the Blasters, died on February 20, 2021. He was found dead in his bed in his Austin, Texas, home, which had been without heat for several days during the severe 2021 Texas power crisis.

== Lineups ==
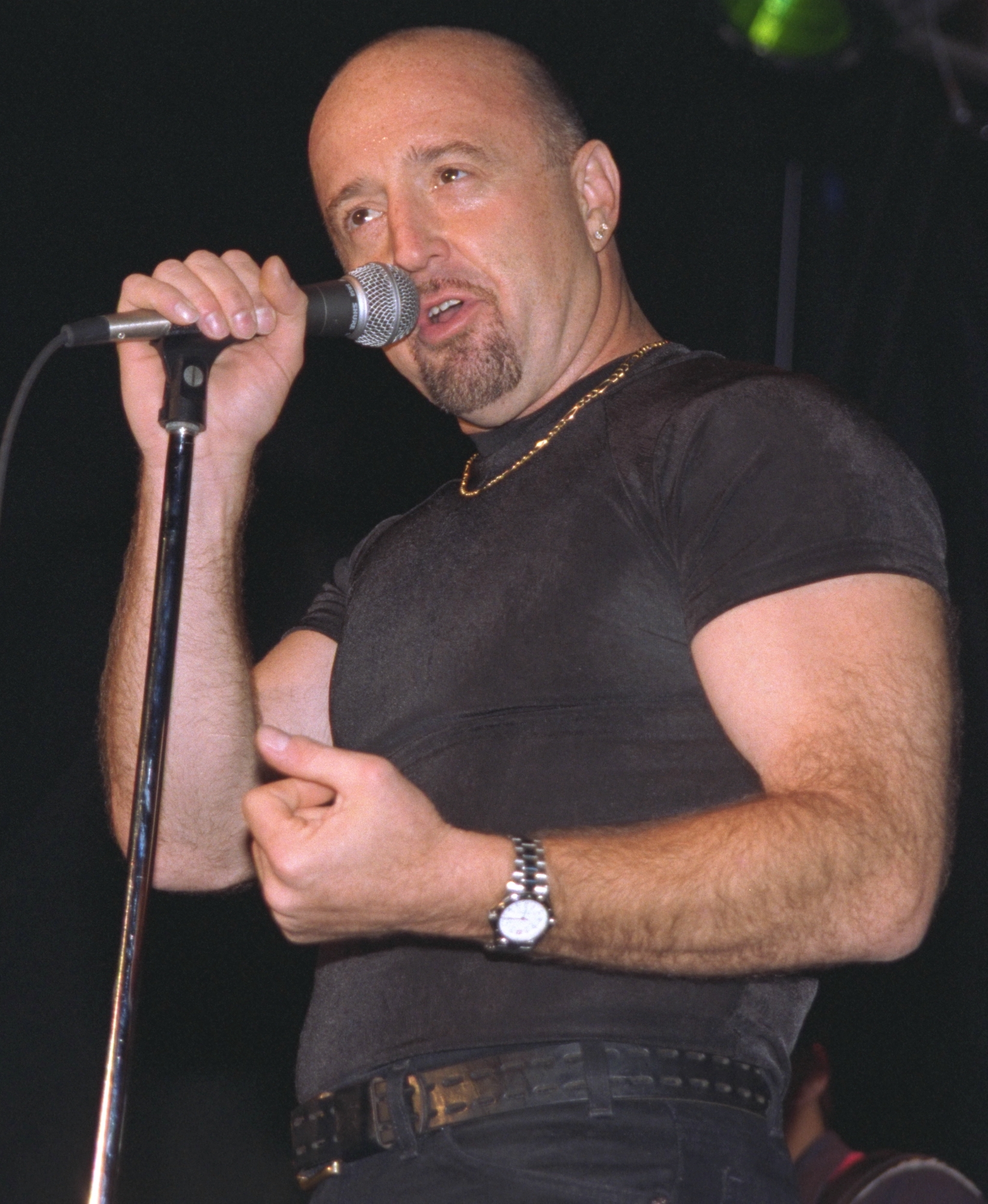
Kim Wilson

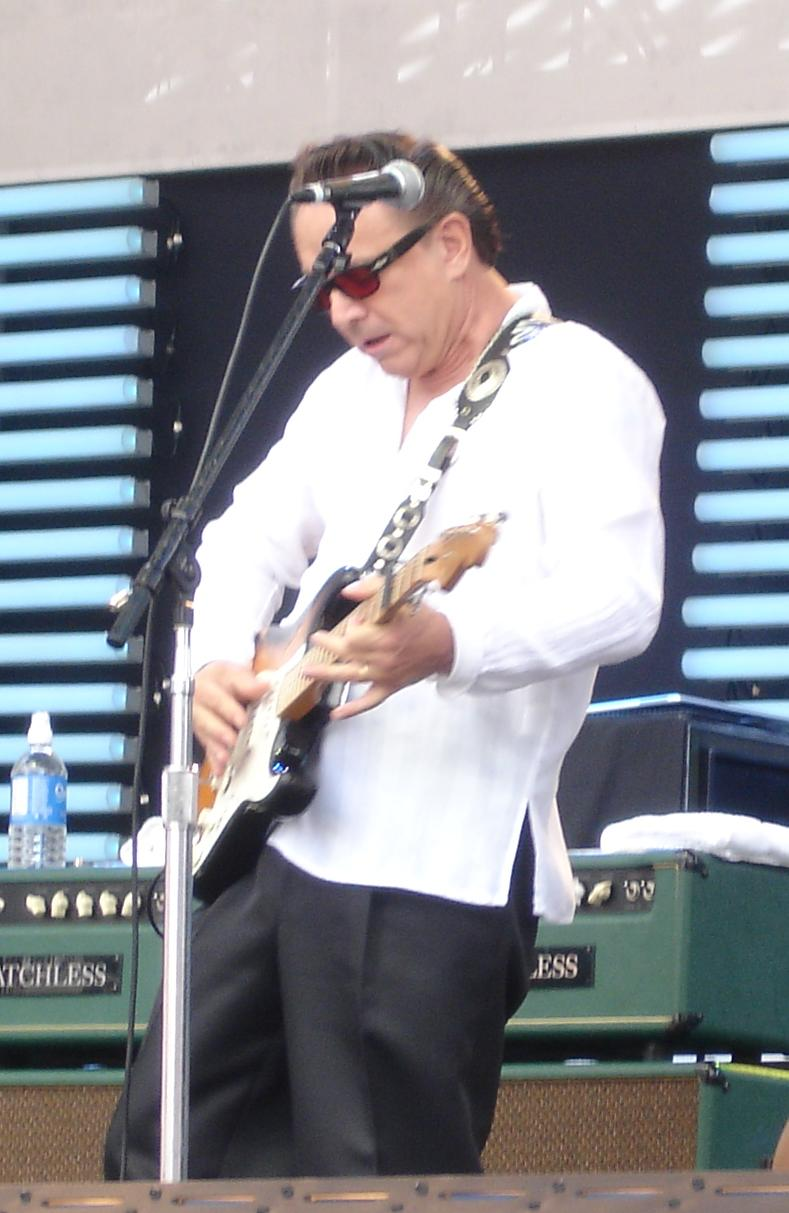
Jimmie Vaughan

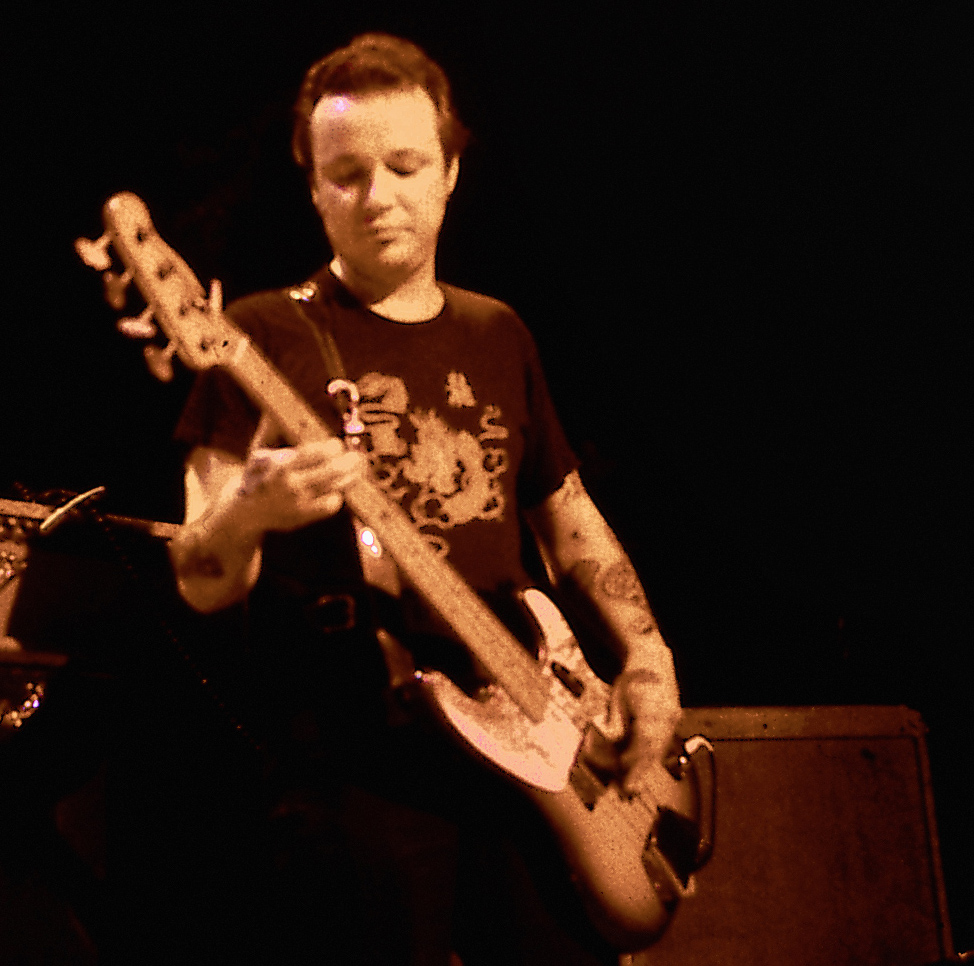
Keith Ferguson

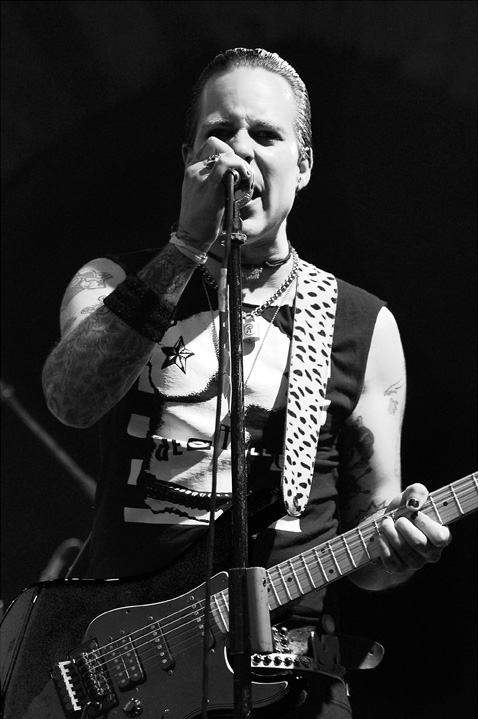
Nick Curran

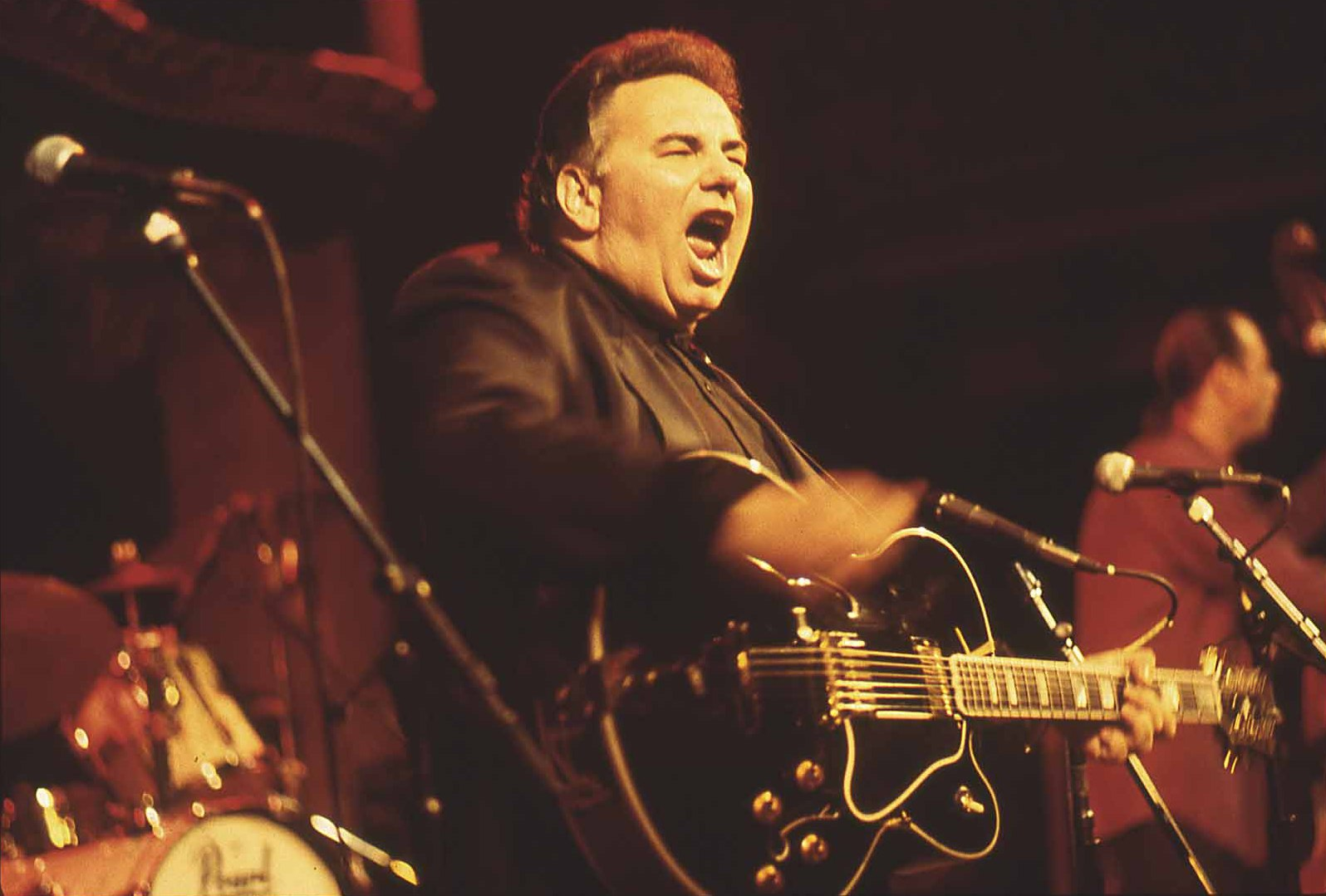
Duke Robillard

Johnny Moeller

1976–1979	Kim Wilson: Vocals, harmonica; Jimmie Vaughan: Guitar; John Melancon: Bass; Mike Buck: Drums
1979–1985	Kim Wilson: Vocals, harmonica; Jimmie Vaughan: Guitar; Keith Ferguson: Bass; Fran Christina: Drums
1985–1988	Kim Wilson: Vocals, harmonica; Jimmie Vaughan: Guitar; Preston Hubbard: Bass; Fran Christina: Drums; Junior Brantley: Keyboards (1986–1987); Chuck Leavell: Keyboards (1987–1988)
1988–1989	Kim Wilson: Vocals, harmonica; Jimmie Vaughan: Guitar; Doyle Bramhall II: Guitar; Austin de Lone: Keyboards; Preston Hubbard: Bass; Fran Christina: Drums
1990–1993	Kim Wilson: Vocals, harmonica; Duke Robillard: Guitar; Doug "Kid" Bangham: Guitar; Austin de Lone: Keyboards; Preston Hubbard: Bass; Fran Christina: Drums
1993–1996	Kim Wilson: Vocals, harmonica; Kid Ramos: Guitar; Willie J. Campbell: Bass; Gene Taylor: Keyboards; Fran Christina: Drums
1996–1999	Kim Wilson: Vocals, harmonica; Kid Ramos: Guitar; Willie J. Campbell: Bass; Gene Taylor: Keyboards; Jimi Bott: Drums
1999–2000	Kim Wilson: Vocals, harmonica; Kid Ramos: Guitar; Willie J. Campbell: Bass; Gene Taylor: Keyboards; Richard Innes: Drums
2000–2002	Kim Wilson: Vocals, harmonica; Kid Ramos: Guitar; Willie J. Campbell: Bass; Gene Taylor: Keyboards; Jimi Bott: Drums
2002	Kim Wilson: Vocals, harmonica; Kid Ramos: Guitar; Willie J. Campbell: Bass; Gene Taylor: Keyboards; Stephen Hodges: Drums
2002–2005	Kim Wilson: Vocals, harmonica; Troy Gonyea: Guitar; Gene Taylor: Keyboards; Ronnie James Weber: Bass; Jimi Bott: Drums
2005–2007	Kim Wilson: Vocals, harmonica; Nick Curran: Guitar, vocals; Kirk Fletcher: Guitar; Gene Taylor: Keyboards; Ronnie James Weber: Bass; Jimi Bott: Drums
2007–2008	Kim Wilson: Vocals, harmonica; Johnny Moeller: Guitar; Kirk Fletcher: Guitar; Randy Bermudes: Bass; Jay Moeller: Drums
2008–2016	Kim Wilson: Vocals, harmonica; Johnny Moeller: Guitar; Mike Keller: Guitar; Randy Bermudes: Bass; Jay Moeller: Drums
2016–2019	Kim Wilson: Vocals, harmonica; Johnny Moeller: Guitar; Kevin Anker: Keyboards; Steve Gomes: Bass; Wes Watkins: Drums
2019–present	Kim Wilson: Vocals, harmonica; Dean Shot: Guitar; Kevin Anker: Keyboards; Steve Gomes: Bass; Nico Leophonte: Drums

- Timeline

== Discography ==
Albums

- Girls Go Wild (1979)
- What's the Word (1980)
- Butt Rockin' (1981)
- T-Bird Rhythm (1982)
- Tuff Enuff (1986)
- Hot Number (1987)
- Powerful Stuff (1989)
- Walk That Walk, Talk That Talk (1991)
- Roll of the Dice (1995)
- High Water (1997)
- Painted On (2005)
- Thunderbirds! (2009, sold only at shows)
- On the Verge (2013)
- Strong Like That (2016)
- Struck Down (2024)

Compilation albums

- Portfolio (1987)
- The Essential Fabulous Thunderbirds (1991)
- Hot Stuff: The Greatest Hits (1992)
- Wrap It Up (1993)
- The Fabulous Thunderbirds/What's the Word (1993)
- Butt Rockin'/T-Bird Rhythm (1993)
- Different Tacos (1996)
- The Best of the Fabulous Thunderbirds (1997)
- Tuff Enuff/Powerful Stuff (1999)
- Tacos Deluxe (2003)
- The Best of the Fabulous Thunderbirds: Early Birds Special (2011)
- The Bad and Best of the Fabulous Thunderbirds (2013)

Live albums

- Live from London (1985)
- Live [AKA Invitation Only] (2001)

Singles

- "Tuff Enuff" (1986) No. 10 US, No. 83 AUS
- "Wrap It Up" (1986) No. 50 US
- "Why Get Up" (1986)
- "Stand Back" (1987) No. 76 US
- "How Do You Spell Love" (1987)
- "Wasted Tears" (1988)
- "Powerful Stuff" (1988) No. 65 US
- "Knock Yourself Out" (1989)

== Music videos ==
- "One's Too Many" (1981)
- "I Believe I'm In Love With You" (1981)
- "How Do You Spell Love" (1982)
- "Can't Tear It Up Enuff" (1982)
- "Tuff Enuff" from the film "Gung Ho" (1986)
- "Wrap It Up" (1986)
- "How Do You Spell Love" (1987)
- "Powerful Stuff" (1989)
- "Knock Yourself Out" (1989)

== See also ==
- Music of Austin
- Music of Texas
- Rockabilly
- Texas blues
- List of blues musicians
- List of 1980s one-hit wonders in the United States
