= Jimmie Vaughan =

American blues rock guitarist and singer (born 1951)

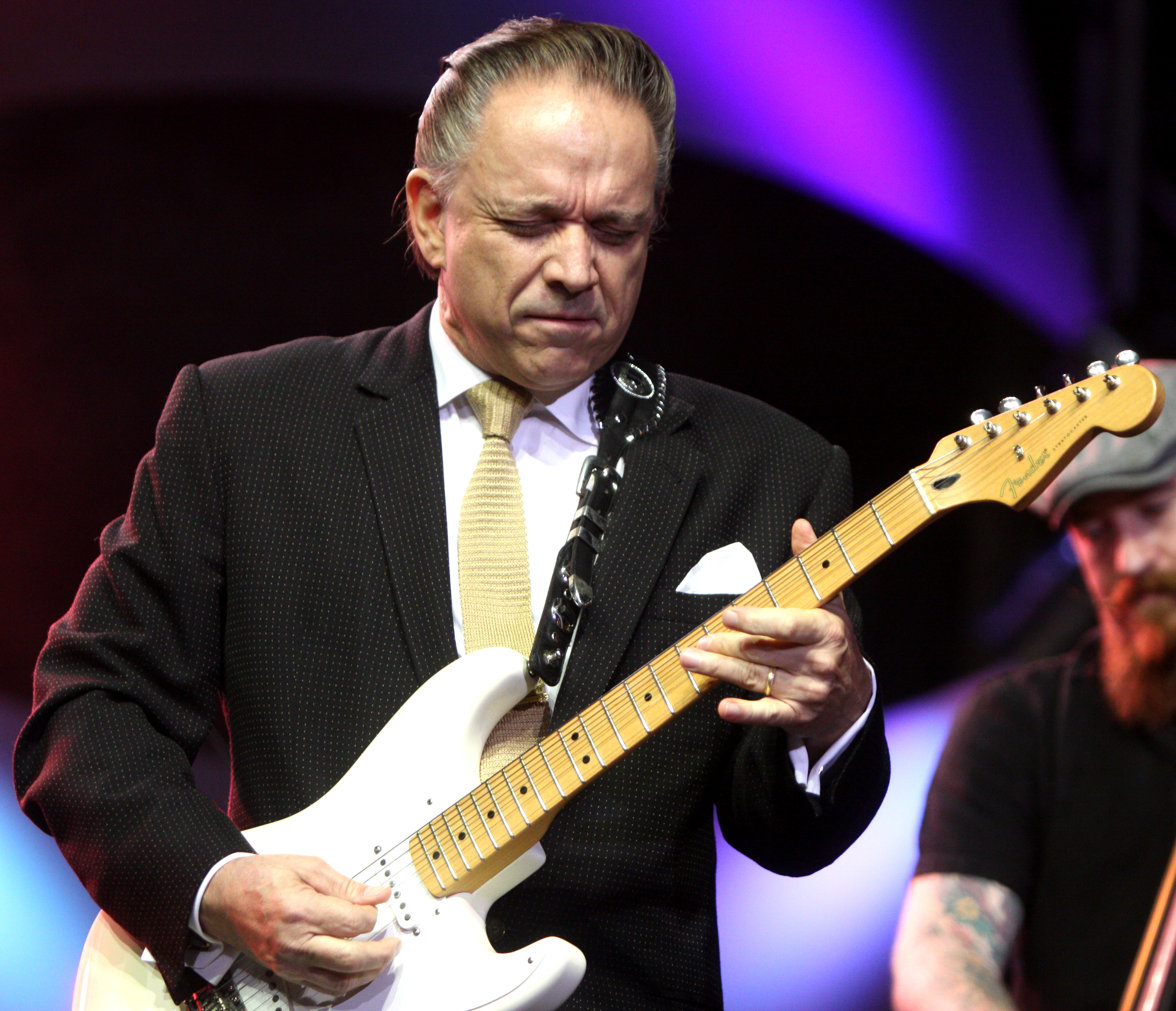
- Vaughan performing in 2012

Background information
- Born: March 20, 1951 (age 75); Oak Cliff, Dallas, Texas, U.S.
- Genres: Electric blues, blues rock, Texas blues, jazz blues
- Occupation: Musician
- Instruments: Guitar, vocals
- Years active: Late 1960s–present
- Labels: Epic, Shout! Factory, Proper Records, The Last Music Company
- Formerly of: The Vaughan Brothers, The Fabulous Thunderbirds
- Website: jimmievaughan.com

Jimmie Lawrence Vaughan Jr. (born March 20, 1951) is an American blues rock guitarist and singer based in Austin, Texas. A founding member of The Fabulous Thunderbirds, he is the older brother of the deceased Texas blues guitarist Stevie Ray Vaughan.

Several notable blues guitarists have had a significant influence on Vaughan's playing style, including the "Three Kings" (Albert, Freddie, and B.B. King) and Johnny "Guitar" Watson.

== Early career ==
Jimmie Vaughan was born on March 20, 1951, in Dallas County, Texas, United States, to parents Jimmie Lee Vaughan and Martha Jean Cook. His only sibling, younger brother Stevie Ray, was born in 1954. Raised in Dallas, Texas, Vaughan attended L V. Stockard Junior High where on February 3, 1965, he first played before an audience in a group named The Pendulums, or the JSP's, along with Phil Campbell and Ronny Sterling. Vaughan moved to Austin in the late 1960s and began playing with such musicians as Paul Ray and WC Clark.

In 1966, Vaughan joined The Chessmen after the death of original band leader, guitarist, and vocalist, Robert Patton. In 1969, The Chessmen opened for The Jimi Hendrix Experience in Fort Worth, Texas. It was at this show that Vaughan lent Jimi Hendrix his Vox Wah-wah pedal as Hendrix had broken his.

Jimmie Vaughan developed his own easily recognized personal style. He formed the band The Fabulous Thunderbirds with lead singer and harpist Kim Wilson, bassist Keith Ferguson, and drummers Mike Buck and Fran Christina. (The original Fabulous Thunderbirds were all protégés of Austin, Texas blues club owner Clifford Antone). The band's first four albums, released between 1979 and 1983, are ranked among the most important 'white blues' recordings. These early albums did not sell well, so the band was left without a recording contract for a couple of years (during the time when Vaughan's younger brother achieved commercial success). During this time, Vaughan played lead guitar on fellow Texas blues musician Bill Carter's 1985 album, Stompin' Grounds, also playing Carter's most well-known song, "Willie The Wimp", which would be introduced a year later to Stevie Ray Vaughan and played on live albums.

The Fabulous Thunderbirds got a new contract in 1986, and made several albums with a more commercially popular sound and production style. Vaughan left the band in 1990, and made his only "duo album", Family Style, with his younger brother, Stevie Ray Vaughan. Before the album's release, Stevie Ray died in a helicopter crash along with three members of Eric Clapton's entourage in East Troy, Wisconsin, on August 27, 1990. The album was released a month after the accident. The artist listed on the album was "The Vaughan Brothers". The album was light, blues-influenced rock, with Jimmie Vaughan singing on several tracks.

== Solo career ==
Vaughan released his first solo album, Strange Pleasure, in 1994. The album contained a song "Six Strings Down" that was dedicated to the memory of his brother. He has continued his solo career since then. Vaughan's solo albums contain mostly blues-rock material that he writes himself. He made a special guest appearance on Bo Diddley's 1996 album A Man Amongst Men, playing guitar on the tracks "He's Got A Key" and "Coatimundi". In 2001, Vaughan paid an installment on his (and the Fabulous Thunderbirds') debt to harmonica swamp blues when he contributed guitar to the Lazy Lester album Blues Stop Knockin.'

Since 1997 Fender has produced a Jimmie Vaughan Tex-Mex Stratocaster. Vaughan appeared in the 1998 released film Blues Brothers 2000 as a member of the fictional "Louisiana Gator Boys" blues band led by B. B. King. Vaughan was the third opening act for most of the dates of Bob Dylan's summer 2006 tour, preceded by Elana James and the Continental Two and Junior Brown.

Vaughan continues to perform. Shout! Factory released his first new album in nine years, Plays Blues, Ballads & Favorites, on July 6, 2010.

Also in 2010, he appeared as a guest musician on Eric Johnson's album Up Close, and he played with Eric Clapton, Robert Cray, BB King, Hubert Sumlin, and others during the Crossroads Guitar Festival. He also performed on the episode of the TBS cable television show Conan, that aired December 22, 2010.

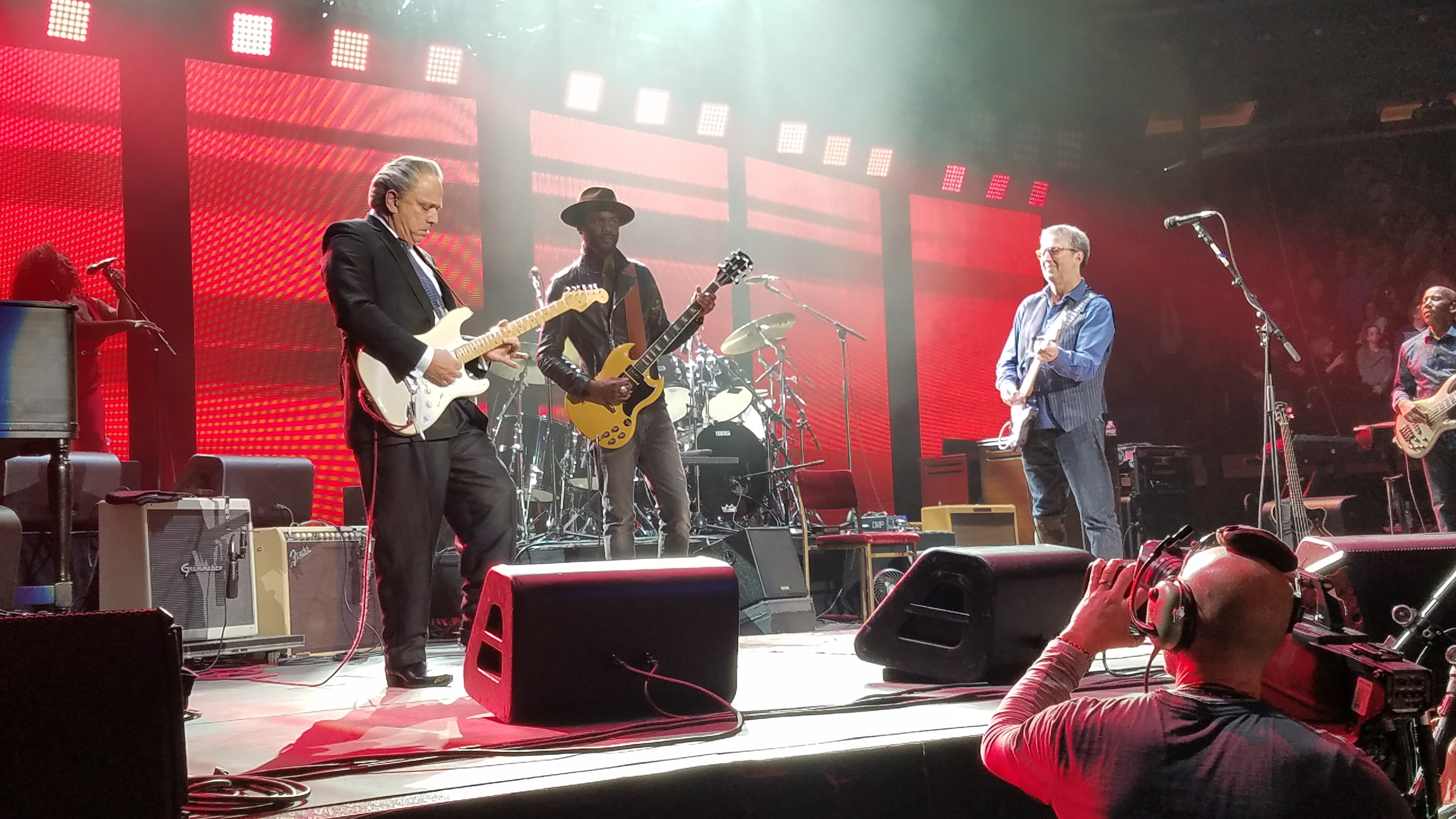
Jimmie Vaughan and Gary Clark, Jr. join Eric Clapton on stage for the encore during Clapton's show at Madison Square Garden on May 19, 2017.

Vaughan performed at the 11th Edition of the Rochester International Jazz Festival on Friday, June 29, 2012.

In 2014, Vaughan performed at the Mahindra Blues Festival in India alongside the Tedeschi Trucks Band.

Vaughan appeared and performed as a guest on an episode of the PBS cable television show Austin City Limits, with the Foo Fighters, which aired on February 7, 2015. He and the Foo Fighters were accompanied on stage by another guest guitarist, Gary Clark, Jr., a native of Austin, Texas.

His 2019 recording, Baby, Please Come Home, was chosen as a 'Favorite Blues Album' by AllMusic.

Vaughan performed with Bob Dylan in Austin, Texas on April 6, 2024, as a guest guitarist. He replaced Doug Lancio on nine songs.

Vaughan on 9/11/2026 will be on stage with Eric Clapton performing at the United Center in Chicago, IL.

== Personal life ==
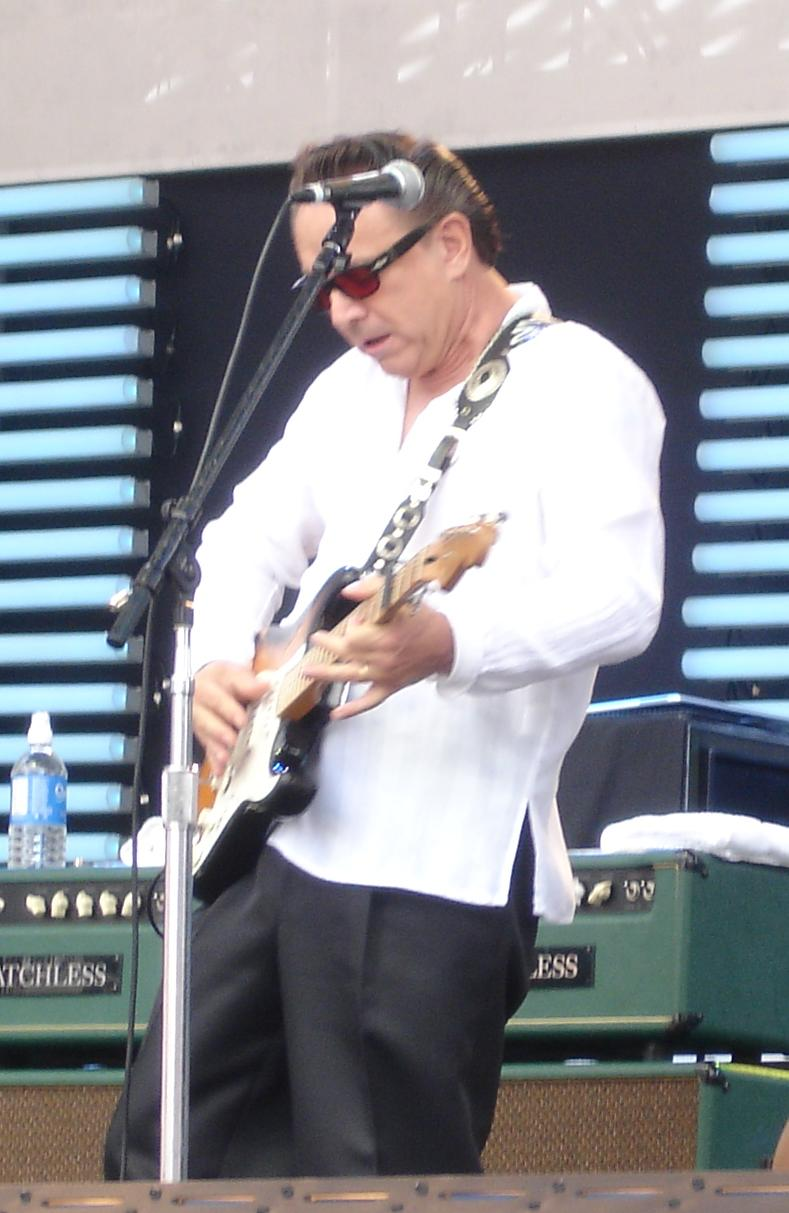
Vaughan performing at the 2007 Crossroads Guitar Festival

Vaughan has a son, Tyrone Vaughan, who is also a guitarist.

Vaughan is close friends with Dennis Quaid. They worked together on the film Great Balls of Fire.

An avid car collector, Vaughan has had many of his custom cars and hot rods displayed in museums, as well as featured in rodding and custom magazines.

Vaughan has been politically active to some degree. He endorsed Republican presidential candidate Ron Paul in 2008 and played before one of Paul's speeches at the University of Texas. Vaughan also opened for Ron Paul's keynote address at the Rally for the Republic in St. Paul, Minnesota on September 2, 2008 and performed at Paul's "We are the Future" rally in Tampa, Florida on August 26, 2012.

Vaughan was quoted as explaining that the death of his brother, guitarist Stevie Ray Vaughan, devastated him to the point that he considered giving up playing guitar.

== Health ==
In Vaughan's later years, his declining health began to take a toll on his career. He suffers from stenosis and has had three heart attacks; after his third heart attack in December 2022, he had quadruple bypass heart surgery.

In May 2024, Vaughan announced that he was postponing all tour dates to undergo treatment for "a curable form of cancer."

== Select discography ==
=== Singles ===
- 1972: The Storm – "The Doo-It" // "Lost On The Ocean Part 2" (Connie Records)
- 1986: Jimmie Vaughan & Duke Robillard – "Cookin'" (Guitar Player Magazine [7" flexi-disc])

=== Albums ===
- 1979: The Fabulous Thunderbirds – Girls Go Wild (Takoma/Chrysalis)
- 1980: The Fabulous Thunderbirds – What's The Word (Chrysalis)
- 1981: The Fabulous Thunderbirds – Butt Rockin' (Chrysalis)
- 1982: The Fabulous Thunderbirds – T-Bird Rhythm (Chrysalis)
- 1986: The Fabulous Thunderbirds – Tuff Enuff (CBS Associated)
- 1987: The Fabulous Thunderbirds – Hot Number (CBS Associated)
- 1989: The Fabulous Thunderbirds – Powerful Stuff (CBS Associated)
- 1990: The Vaughan Brothers – Family Style [with Stevie Ray Vaughan] (Epic)
- 1994: Strange Pleasure (Epic)
- 1998: Out There (Epic)
- 2001: Do You Get The Blues? (Artemis; reissue: 2024, The Last Record Co.)
- 2007: Omar Kent Dykes & Jimmie Vaughan – On The Jimmy Reed Highway (Ruf)
- 2010: Plays Blues, Ballads & Favorites (Proper; Shout! Factory)
- 2011: Plays More Blues, Ballads & Favorites (Proper; Shout! Factory)
- 2017: Jimmie Vaughan Trio – Live At C-Boy's [with Mike Flanigin, Barry "Frosty" Smith] (Proper; The Last Music Co.)
- 2019: Baby, Please Come Home (The Last Music Co.)
- 2020: The Pleasure's All Mine (The Complete Blues, Ballads & Favorites Sessions) (The Last Music Co.) 2-CD compilation
- 2021: The Jimmie Vaughan Story (Deluxe Edition, 5-CD set, with 1 x 12" vinyl LP, 2 x 7" vinyl singles, and a 240-page book) (The Last Music Co.)

== Awards ==
=== Grammy Awards ===
- 1990: Contemporary Blues Recording ‒ The Vaughan Brothers ‒ Family Style
- 1990: Rock Instrumental Performance ‒ The Vaughan Brothers ‒ "D/FW"
- 1996: Rock Instrumental Performance ‒ "SRV Shuffle"
- 2001: Traditional Blues Album ‒ Do You Get The Blues?

=== Blues Music Awards ===
- 2020: Traditional Blues Male Artist of the Year
