= Fran Christina =

American drummer

- Born: Francis Anthony Christina; February 1, 1951 (age 75); Westerly, Rhode Island, US
- Genres: Blues, blues rock, western swing, jump blues, R&B
- Occupations: Musician, Producer, Printer
- Instruments: Drums, Vocals
- Years active: 1963-present
- Labels: Chrysalis, Epic, Sony, Columbia
- Formerly of: Roomful of Blues, The Fabulous Thunderbirds

Francis Anthony Christina (born February 1, 1951) is an American drummer known for his work in Texas blues band the Fabulous Thunderbirds (1979–97). He was also the founding drummer of Roomful of Blues (1967–1971).

== Early life ==
Christina was born in Westerly, Rhode Island, United States. He is the third of seven children born to James Christina and Josephine Trebisacci in an Italian-American Catholic family. As a boy, he would sneak into the local Black Baptist church to listen to the music there. At the age of 10, he improvised as a drummer for his brother's garage band. At age 12, Christina was given his first real set of drums. He taught himself music, then formed a band and began to perform at venues including a bowling alley lounge and a strip club.

== Career ==
Roomful of Blues

In 1967, Christina along with Duke Robillard, Al Copley and Larry Peduzzi formed the blues band, Roomful of Blues. The quartet eventually became an R&B/jump blues band.

The Boogie Brothers

Following Roomful of Blues in 1971, Christina joined with his former associates, including guitarist/ vocalist Johnny Nicholas, harmonica Steve Nardella, and bass player Sarah Brown, and formed the Boogie Brothers in 1971, in Ann Arbor, Michigan. Except for Sarah Brown, all the members were previously part of a group named Black Cat. They became the house band at The Blind Pig, where they were a backing/touring band for various blues artists, including Johnny Shines, Big Walter "Shakey" Horton, Boogie Woogie Red, Mississippi Fred McDowell, Billy Boy Arnold, and others. in Ann Arbor, Michigan.

In 1971 and 1972, Christina and the Boogie Brothers performed at the Ann Arbor Blues and Jazz Festival.

The Rhythm Rockers, Vipers, and others

In 1972, Christina toured with Johnny Nicholas and Brown as the Rhythm Rockers, backing Big Walter Horton, and in the following year, he formed The Vipers. He then became a drummer for the multi-Grammy award-winning western swing band Asleep at the Wheel and later toured the US with Commander Cody and His Lost Planet Airmen and The Fabulous Thunderbirds. Christina performed on two albums with the band Asleep at the Wheel. In 1983 Christina performed on Carlos Santana's Havana Moon album. In 1984 he recorded with Stevie Ray Vaughan on the multi-platinum album Couldn't Stand the Weather and in 1988 he performed with Bonnie Raitt on the Grammy Award-winning Nick of Time album. He then toured the US with Commander Cody and His Lost Planet Airmen and The Fabulous Thunderbirds. Christina was the drummer for the western swing band Asleep at the Wheel.

The Fabulous Thunderbirds

In 1979, he officially became a member of an Austin blues band The Fabulous Thunderbirds. Other than Christina on drums, the band included Jimmie Vaughan on guitar, Kim Wilson on vocals and harmonica, and Keith Ferguson on bass. After joining the band full-time, Christina performed with the band's second release What's the Word for the Chrysalis label. He then performed on several albums with the band.

The band's 1986 album Tuff Enuff was commercially successful and was certified platinum. They were nominated for two Grammys in 1987. Several artists invited them to open shows including The Rolling Stones, ZZ Top, Tom Petty, The Doobie Brothers, The Who, REO Speedwagon, B.B. King, The Eurythmics, Bob Seger and Crosby, Stills & Nash. Christina was a member of the band until he left in 1996. During his time with the Fabulous Thunderbirds, the band won the W. C. Handy Band of the Year award in 1986, was nominated for two Grammys in 1987, and their songs were selected as soundtracks for numerous movies and Christina departed in 1996.

Post-Thunderbirds career

Christina played with blues singer and pianist Marcia Ball and Doug Sahm’s Last Real Texas Blues Band before retiring from the road in 1999. In 2021 and 2022 Christina worked on a Matt "Guitar" Murphy tribute album project with his brother, fellow drummer Bobby Christina. Christina performed on the album and produced several cuts. Since 1995, Christina has been producing intaglio etchings for his wife, artist Julie Speed.

In 2023, he performed on Al Staehely's Somewhere In West Texas.

== Citations and awards ==
Year	Nominee/Work	Category	Award	Result
1981	The Fabulous Thunderbirds	Best Blues/Soul	Buddy	Won
1981	The Fabulous Thunderbirds	Band of the Year	Austin Chronicle Music Awards	Won
1981	The Fabulous Thunderbirds	Best Blues Band	Austin Chronicle Music Awards	Won
1982	The Fabulous Thunderbirds	Band of the Year	Austin Chronicle Music Awards	Won
1982	The Fabulous Thunderbirds	Best Blues Band	Austin Chronicle Music Awards	Won
1982	The Fabulous Thunderbirds	Hall of Fame	Austin Chronicle Music Awards	Won
1986	The Fabulous Thunderbirds	Band of the Year	W. C. Handy	Won
1987	The Fabulous Thunderbirds "Down at Antones"	Best Rock Instrumental	Grammy	Nominated
1987	The Fabulous Thunderbirds "Tuff Enough"	Best Rock Vocal	Grammy	Nominated
1987	The Fabulous Thunderbirds	Band of the Year	Austin Chronicle Music Awards	Won
1990	The Fabulous Thunderbirds	Band of the Decade	Austin Chronicle Music Awards	Won
2012	Roomful of Blues	Hall of Fame	Rhode Island Music Hall of Fame	Won

== Discography ==
ALBUMS	(** PLATINUM *** MULTI-PLATINUM )		
The Fabulous Thunderbirds	Title	Label	Year
The Fabulous Thunderbirds	What's the Word	Chrysalis	1980
The Fabulous Thunderbirds	Butt Rockin’	Chrysalis	1981
The Fabulous Thunderbirds	T-Bird Rhythm	Chrysalis	1982
The Fabulous Thunderbirds	** Tuff Enuff	CBS Associated	1986
The Fabulous Thunderbirds	Hot Number	Epic	1988
The Fabulous Thunderbirds	Powerful Stuff	Epic	1989
The Fabulous Thunderbirds	Walk That Walk	Epic	1991
The Fabulous Thunderbirds	Roll of the Dice	Private Music	1995
The Fabulous Thunderbirds	Girls Go Wild (CD reissue of 1979 album with 3 bonus tracks that feature Fran)	Benchmark	2000

Band Member	Title	Label	Year
Bobo Jenkins	Just a Fool in Love Again	Big Star	1972
Boogie Woogie Red	Live at the Bling Pig	Blind Pig	1973
Boogie Woogie Red	Red Hot	Blind Pig	1977
Johnny Shines, Big Walter Horton, The Boogie Brothers	Ann Arbor Jazz & Blues Fest	Atlantic	1977
Asleep at the Wheel	Served Live	Atlantic	1978
Asleep at the Wheel	Framed	Atlantic	1980
The Fabulous Thunderbirds	King Biscuit Flower Hour Presents	KBFH Records	1987
Big Walter Horton	Live at the El Mocambo	Red Lightnin’	1991
Big Walter Horton	Ann Arbor Jazz & Blues Fest #4	Sequel	1996
Marcia Ball	Let Me Play With Your Poodle	Rounder	1997
Al Copley	Good Understanding	Bullseye	1997
The Fabulous Thunderbirds	Martin Scorsese Presents	Hip-O	2003
Doug Sahm	Live in Stockholm	Dougalive1	2012

Guest	Title	Label	Year
Carlos Santana	Havana Moon	Columbia	1983
Stevie Ray Vaughan	*** Couldn’t Stand the Weather	Epic	1984
Denny Freeman	Blues Cruise	Amazing	1986
Lou Ann Barton	Read My Lips	Antone's	1987
Ron Levy	Wild Kingdom	Black Top	1987
Bonnie Raitt	*** Nick of Time	Capitol	1988
Dunn Packer Band	Love Against the Wall	Tramp Records	1990
Kim Wilson	Tigerman	Antone's	1993
W.C. Clark	Heart of Gold	Black Top	1994
Kim Wilson	That's Life	Antone's	1995
Sarah Brown	Sayin' What I'm Thinkin'	Blind Pig	1996
Pat Boyack and the Prowlers	Super Blue and Funky	Bullseye	1997
The Radio Kings	Money Road	Bullseye	1998
Knickerbocker All-Stars	Open Mike at the Knick	JP Cadillac	2016
Lou Ann Barton	The Best	Rockbeat	2016

SINGLES	Title	Label	Year
The Vipers	“Buzzard Luck”/"Huron River Drive"	Debut launch of Blind Pig	1973
Asleep at the Wheel	“Choo Choo Ch'Boogie”	Capitol	1979
The Fabulous Thunderbirds	“Sugar Coated Love”	Chrysalis	1980
The Fabulous Thunderbirds	“Cherry Pink and Apple Blossom White”	Chrysalis	1981
Carlos Santana	“Havana Moon”	Columbia	1983
Junior Brown	“Too Many Nights in the Roadhouse”	Dynamic	1984
Denny Freeman	“Out of Control”	V-8 Records	1984
Sarah Brown	“Four Hours Sleep”	V-8 Records	1985
The Fabulous Thunderbirds	“Wrap it Up”	Sonet; CBS	1986
The Fabulous Thunderbirds	“Tuff Enuff”	Sonet	1986
The Fabulous Thunderbirds	“How Do You Spell Love?”	CBS	1986
The Fabulous Thunderbirds	“Why Get Up?”	CBS	1987
The Fabulous Thunderbirds	“Stand Back”	CBS	1987
The Fabulous Thunderbirds	“The Crawl”	Chrysalis	1987
The Fabulous Thunderbirds	“Powerful Stuff”	Elektra	1988

Band	Title	Label	Year
Jimmie Vaughan w/Thunderbirds	The Jimmie Vaughan Story	Last	2021
The Fabulous Thunderbirds	Austin R&B Xmas	Austin; Epic	1987
The Fabulous Thunderbirds	Antone’s Anthology, Vol. 2	Antone's	1991
The Fabulous Thunderbirds	The Essential	EMI/Capitol	1991
The Fabulous Thunderbirds	Hot Stuff: Greatest Hits	Epic	1992
The Fabulous Thunderbirds	Blues Masters	Rhino	1992
The Fabulous Thunderbirds	Wrap It Up	Sony BMG	1993
The Fabulous Thunderbirds	Butt Rockin'/T-Bird Rhythm	Beat Goes On (BGO)	1996
The Fabulous Thunderbirds	Different Tacos	Country Town	1996
The Fabulous Thunderbirds	Best of Fabulous Thunderbirds	Chrysalis	1997
The Fabulous Thunderbirds	Tuff Enuff/Powerful Stuff	Sony	1999
The Fabulous Thunderbirds	Gold & Platinum Hits '80s	Realm Records	2001
The Fabulous Thunderbirds	Tacos Deluxe	Benchmark	2003
The Fabulous Thunderbirds	Collection	Disky	2004
The Fabulous Thunderbirds	Tuff Enuff/Hot Number	Acadia	2007
The Fabulous Thunderbirds	Pure America	Sony	2011
The Fabulous Thunderbirds	Early Bird Special: The Best of the Fabulous Thunderbirds	Benchmark	2011
The Fabulous Thunderbirds	Pure Guitar Legends	Sony	2012
The Fabulous Thunderbirds	Powerful Stuff/Walk That Walk	Floating World	2013
The Fabulous Thunderbirds	The Bad and the Best of	Repertoire	2013
The Fabulous Thunderbirds	Tuff Enuff/Hot Number/Roll of the Dice	Floating World	2014
The Fabulous Thunderbirds	Portfolio	EMI	1987

Producer/Executive Producer (EP)	Title	Label	Year
Denny Freeman	Blues Cruise	Amazing	1986
Fabulous Thunderbirds (EP)	Tuff Enuff	CBS/SONY	1986
Fabulous Thunderbirds (EP)	Powerful Stuff	CBS/SONY	1989
Fabulous Thunderbirds (EP)	Walk That Walk	CBS/SONY	1991
Sarah Brown	Sayin' What I’m Thinkin'	Blind Pig	1996

SOUNDTRACKS
Film/TV Show	Song	Performed With	Year
Roadie	“Texas Me & You”	Asleep at the Wheel	1979
Wanda Nevada	“Behind Shadowed Walls”	Asleep at the Wheel	1979
Tex	“Incidental”	The Fabulous Thunderbirds	1982
Tough Guys	“Tuff Enuff”	The Fabulous Thunderbirds	1986
The Naked Cage	“Tuff Enuff”	The Fabulous Thunderbirds	1986
Gung Ho	“Tuff Enuff”	The Fabulous Thunderbirds	1986
My Cousin Vinny	“Way Down South”	The Fabulous Thunderbirds	1987
Porky's Revenge	Stagger Lee	The Fabulous Thunderbirds	1985
Live from London	The Fabulous Thunderbirds	The Fabulous Thunderbirds	1985
Don't Mess With Texas	“Don’t Mess With Texas”	The Fabulous Thunderbirds	1987
Light of Day (appears in)	“Twisted Off”	The Fabulous Thunderbirds	1987
Bull Durham	“Can’t Tear it up Enuff”	The Fabulous Thunderbirds	1988
*** Cocktail	“Powerful Stuff”	The Fabulous Thunderbirds	1988
Great Balls of Fire	“Great Balls of Fire”	Jerry Lee Lewis, Dennis Quaid, Jimmie Vaughan, John Doe	1989
The Preppie Murders	“Wrap It Up”	The Fabulous Thunderbirds	1989
Ricochet	“Tuff Enuff”	The Fabulous Thunderbirds	1991
Married With Children	“Tuff Enuff”	The Fabulous Thunderbirds	1992
The Game Plan	“Tuff Enuff”	The Fabulous Thunderbirds	2007

Video
Band	Song	Year
Lucky Oceans	“Deep Water”	1978
The Fabulous Thunderbirds	“How Do You Spell Love”	1980
The Fabulous Thunderbirds	“Can’t Tear It Up Enough”	1980
The Fabulous Thunderbirds	"I Believe I'm in Love With You"	1981
The Fabulous Thunderbirds	“Live From London”	1985
The Fabulous Thunderbirds	“Tuff Enuff”	1986
The Fabulous Thunderbirds	“Wrap It Up”	1986
The Fabulous Thunderbirds	“How do You Spell Love” ver.2	1987
The Fabulous Thunderbirds	“Stand Back”	1987
The Fabulous Thunderbirds	“Powerful Stuff”	1988
The Fabulous Thunderbirds	“Knock Yourself Out”	1989
Denis Quaid, Jimmie Vaughan, John Doe	“Great Balls of Fire”	1989

=== Equipment ===
Drums: Slingerland Radio King, Pearl Custom, Christina Custom Card, Premiere, Tama

Snare: 6 ½ + 8 1/2 x12

Rack: 9 x 14

Floor Tom: 16 x 16

Cymbals: Sabian 22”ride, 18” crash, K Zildjian 16” crash

== See also ==
- Blues Musicians
- Music of Austin, Texas
- Music of Texas
- Texas Blues
- Western Swing
- List of Texas Blues Musicians
