= Kim Wilson =

American blues singer and harmonica player (born 1951)

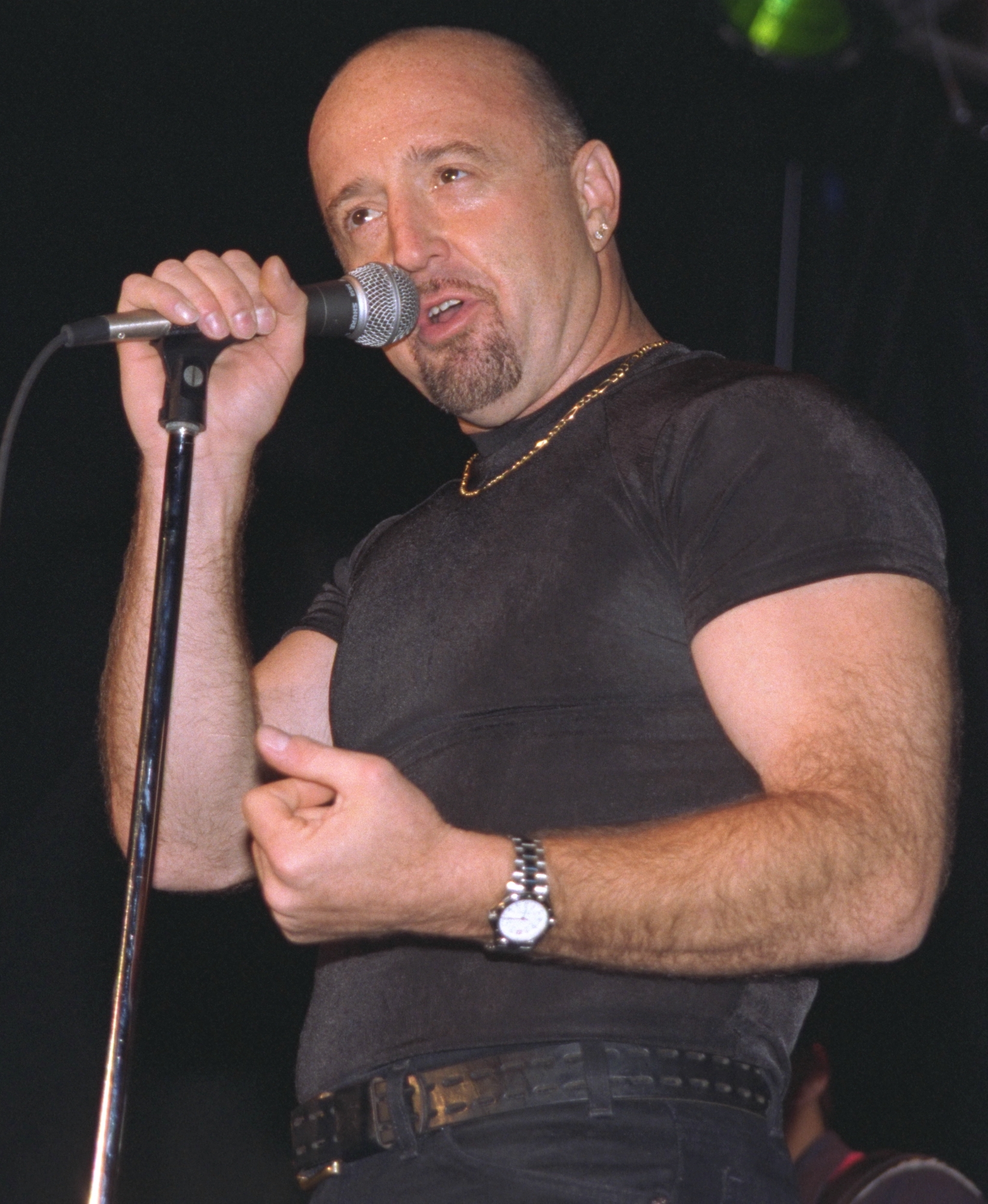
- Wilson performing in 1996

Background information
- Born: January 6, 1951 (age 75); Detroit, Michigan, United States
- Genre: Blues
- Occupation: Musician
- Instruments: Vocals, harmonica
- Years active: Late 1960s–present
- Labels: Antone's; Blue Collar; M.C.; Bluebeat; Severn
- Spouse(s): Shannon Sousa, married September 2016

Kim Wilson (born January 6, 1951) is an American blues singer and harmonica player. He is best known as the lead vocalist and frontman for The Fabulous Thunderbirds on two hit songs of the 1980s, "Tuff Enuff" (which was the group's only Top 40 hit) and "Wrap It Up."

== Career ==
Wilson was born in Detroit, Michigan, in 1951, but he grew up in Goleta, California, where he sometimes went by the stage name of "Goleta Slim." He started with the blues in the late 1960s and was tutored by people like Muddy Waters, Jimmy Rogers, Eddie Taylor, Albert Collins, George "Harmonica" Smith, Luther Tucker and Pee Wee Crayton and was influenced by harmonica players such as Little Walter, James Cotton, Big Walter Horton, Slim Harpo and Lazy Lester. Before he moved to Austin, Texas, in 1974, he was the leader of the band Aces, Straights and Shuffles in Minneapolis, Minnesota; the band released one single. In Austin he formed the Fabulous Thunderbirds with guitarist Jimmie Vaughan. They became the house band at Antone's, a blues club owned by Clifford Antone.

Wilson continues to perform up to 300 concert dates per year at blues music festivals and clubs all over the world, both as leader of the Fabulous Thunderbirds and with Kim Wilson's Blues Allstars.

His powerful style of blues harp playing has been described as "loaded with the textures of a full-blown horn section."

In 2015, Wilson made a guest appearance playing the harmonica on Karen Lovely's album, Ten Miles of Bad Road.

In 2016, Wilson won a Blues Music Award in the 'Instrumentalist - Harmonica' category.

Wilson played himself in a rare television appearance on Wiseguy, "Sleepwalk" episode, in 1989.

== Discography ==
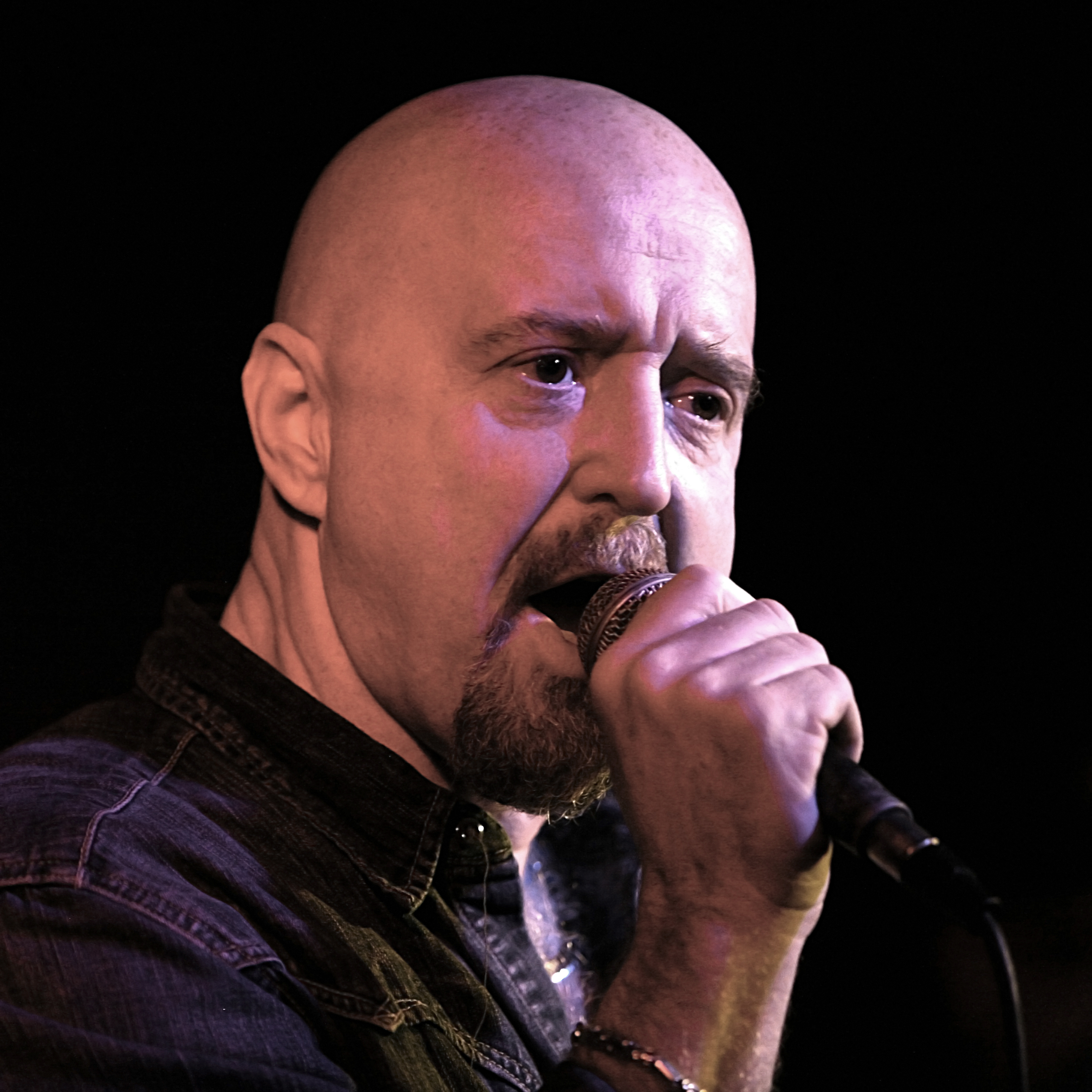
Performing in San Diego 2007

=== Solo ===
- 1993: Tigerman (Antone's)
- 1994: That's Life (Antone's)
- 1997: My Blues (Blue Collar Music)
- 2001: Smokin' Joint (M.C. Records)
- 2003: Looking for Trouble! (M.C. Records)
- 2007: My Blues Sessions: Kim's Mix, Vol. 1 (Kim Wilson Productions)
- 2009: Rhythm Room Sessions, Vol. 1 (Kim Wilson Productions)
- 2017: Blues and Boogie, Vol. 1 (Severn)
- 2020: Take Me Back! (The Bigtone Sessions) (M.C. Records)
- 2025: Slow Burn (M.C. Records) previously unreleased sessions recorded in 2014 and 2020

=== Guest ===
- Ronnie Earl and the Broadcasters, Smoking (Black Top, 1983)
- Roomful of Blues, Dressed Up To Get Messed Up (Varrick, 1984)
- Ronnie Earl and the Broadcasters, They Call Me Mr. Earl (Black Top, 1984)
- Ron Levy's Wild Kingdom, Ron Levy's Wild Kingdom (Black Top, 1986)
- Katie Webster, The Swamp Boogie Queen (Alligator, 1988)
- People Get Ready – A Tribute to Curtis Mayfield (Shanachie, 1993)
- Snuff Johnson, Will The Circle Be Unbroken (Black Magic, 1994)
- Bonnie Raitt, Road Tested (Capitol, 1995)
- Kid Ramos, Kid Ramos (Evidence, 1999)
- James Cotton, 35th Anniversary Jam of the James Cotton Blues Band (Telarc, 2001)
- Big Jack Johnson, The Memphis Barbecue Sessions (M.C. Records, 2002)
- JW-Jones, Bogart's Bounce (guest) (Northern Blues, 2002)
- JW-Jones, My Kind of Evil (producer and guest) (Northern Blues, 2004)
- Wentus Blues Band, Family Album (Bluelight Records, 2004)
- Barrelhouse Chuck, Got My Eyes on You (The Sirens Records, 2006)
- Omar Kent Dykes & Jimmie Vaughan, On the Jimmy Reed Highway (Ruf, 2007)
- Louisiana Red, Back to the Black Bayou (Ruf, 2008)
- Elvin Bishop, The Blues Rolls On (Delta Groove Productions, 2008)
- Eric Clapton, Clapton (Reprise, 2010)
- Mark Knopfler, Privateering (Mercury, 2012)
- Smokin' Joe Kubek & Bnois King, Road Dog's Life (Delta Groove Productions, 2013)
- Barrelhouse Chuck, Driftin' From Town To Town (The Sirens Records, 2013)
- Mud Morganfield, For Pops: A Tribute To Muddy Waters (Severn, 2014)
- Robert Cray Band, 4 Nights of 40 Years (Provogue, 2015)
- Buddy Guy, Born to Play Guitar (RCA, 2015)
- Thornetta Davis, Honest Woman (Sweet Mama Music, 2016)
- Peter Karp, Blue Flame (Rose Cottage, 2018)
- Ash Grunwald, Mojo (Bloodlines, 2019)
- Peter Frampton, All Blues (UMe, 2019)
