= Commodore 64 joystick adapters =

Commodore 64 joystick adapters are hardware peripherals that extend the number of joystick ports on the Commodore 64 computer. The additional joysticks can be used on games with dedicated support for the specific adapter.

A number of different joystick adapters have been constructed for use with the C64. The Classical Games / Protovision adapter is by far supported by the largest number of games. While building instructions are available for most of the adapters, a few adapters are also available commercially. The adapters are also emulated in some of the C64 emulators.

== Original adapters ==
=== Starbyte adapter (1990) ===
Supports 2 additional joysticks at the user port. Released by Starbyte Software in 1990 for use with their game Adidas Championship Tie Break. At the time sold separately under the name Tie Break Adaptor.

Building instructions (plugs and wires only) have been reverse engineered and made available by Groepaz/Hitmen.

=== Kingsoft adapter (1992) ===
Supports 2 additional joysticks at the user port. Introduced with the game Bug Bomber by Kingsoft in 1992. The game came with instructions to build your own 4-player adapter.

Building instructions (plugs and wires only) have been reverse engineered and made available by Groepaz/Hitmen.

=== Protovision 4 player interface / Classical Games adapter (1997) ===
Supports 2 additional joysticks at the user port. Designed by Chester Kollschen (CKX) of Classical Games and released in 1997 with the game Bomb Mania. Kollschen later joined Protovision and the adapter is now available as the Protovision 4 player interface.

Building instructions (plugs, wires and an IC), sample code, shop and list of supported games are available at the Protovision website.

=== Space Balls adapter (1998) ===
Supports 8 joysticks, all connected to the user port and one joyport. Designed by Luigi Pantarotto and released with the game Space Balls (1998) for 2-8 players.

Building instructions (plugs and wires only) is provided with the game Space Balls (called Star Balls in its schematics page).

=== Ninjas SNES pad adapter (1998) ===
Supports 8 SNES pads at the joyports. Designed by Ninja of The Dreams.

Building instructions (plugs and wires only) are available at the Hitmen 4 player adapter website. Code interface is demonstrated in the SNES-Pad-Tooldisk #1.

=== Digital Excess & Hitmen 4 player joystick adapter (1999) ===
Supports 2 additional joysticks at the user port. Designed by Groepaz of Hitmen and Thomas Koncina and Bjoern Odendahl of Digital Excess in 1999 as an easier to build alternative to the Classical Games adapter.

Building instructions (plugs and wires only) and sample code is available at the Hitmen 4 player adapter website.

=== Inception – 8 joysticks adapter (2013) ===
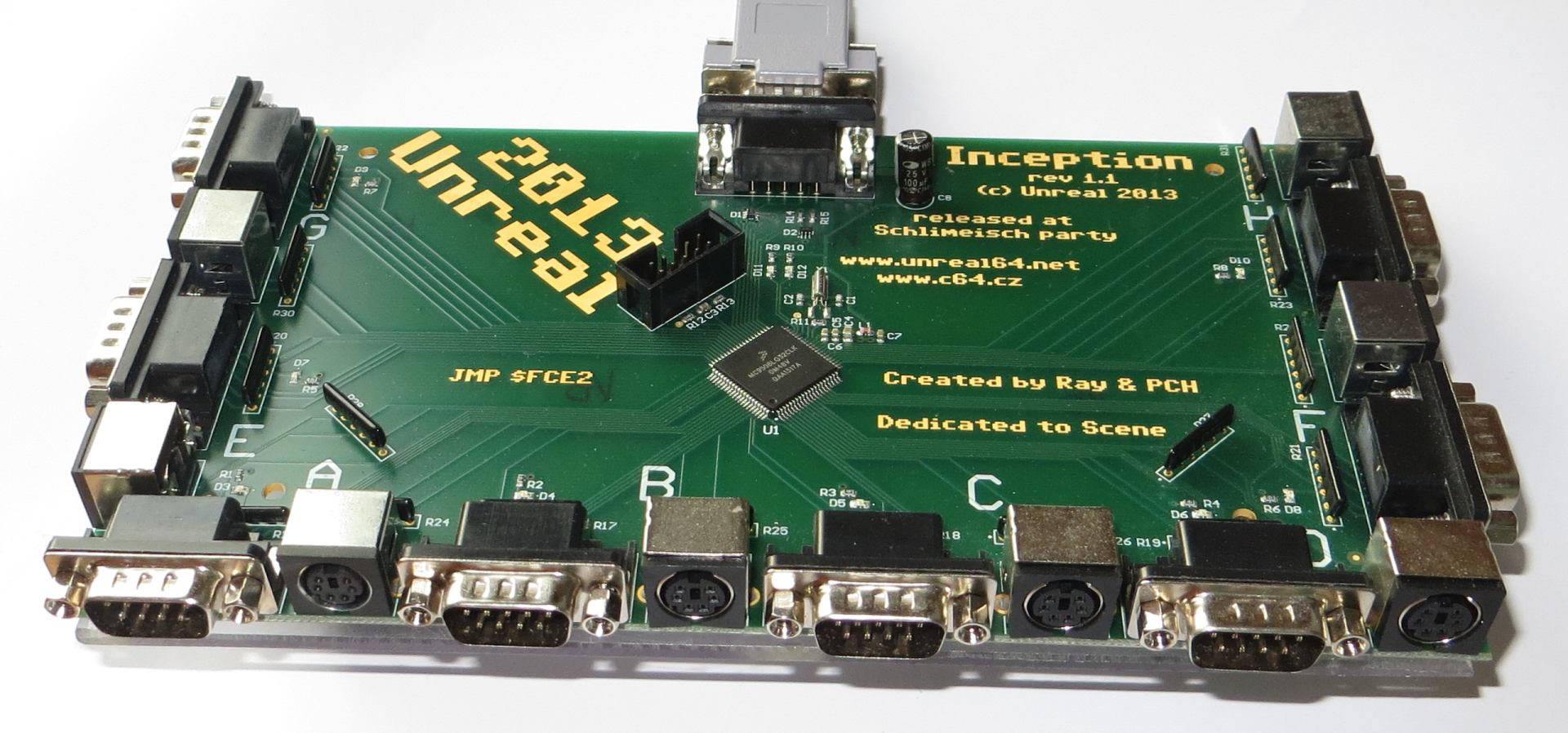
Inception

Supports 8 joysticks at one joystick port. Designed by Ray and PCH (Petr Chlud).

Available commercially at the c64.cz website.

== Compatible adapters ==
=== Singular Crew 4Player Adapter (2008) ===
Supports 2 additional joysticks at the user port. Compatible with the Protovision 4 player interface / the Classical Games Adapter, Digital Excess & Hitmen 4 player joystick adapter and the Kingsoft Adapter. Designed by Singular Crew.

Available commercially at www.zsibvasar.hu website.

== Related adapters ==
Adapters for a few related computers can also be used with the C64. Those adapters include PET (normally only used on the PET/CBM2), Hummer (normally only used on the C64DTV) and OEM (normally only used on the VIC-20). There are probably no game supporting those adapters on the C64.

In addition, adapters have been made that give Commodore 64 games the ability to provide rumble feedback to modern controllers.

== Emulation ==
The C64 emulator VICE supports the Classical Games / Protovision and the Digital Excess & Hitmen adapters from version 2.3., and the Kingsoft and Starbyte adapters from version 2.4.

== Supported games ==
A (near) complete list of games with original or added support for the various adapters.

Title	Year	Description	# Joysticks	Adapter	Interfaced by
Tie Break	1990	original	1–4	S	Starbyte
Bug Bomber	1992	Bomberman clone	1–4	K	Kingsoft
Bomb Mania	1997	Bomberman clone	2–4	C	Protovision
Bomb Mania patch	1998	Bomb Mania (1997) patch	2–4	C, N	Da!NyL
Space Balls	1998	original	2–8	B	Pantarotto
Quadris	1998	Tetris clone	1–4	C	Protovision
Bomb Mania patch	1999	Bomb Mania (1997) patch	2–4	C, D	DXS & HIT
Pac It (preview)	2000	Pac-Man clone	1–4	C	Protovision
Quadtron	2000	Snakes clone	2–4	C	Protovision
International Karate + Gold	2001	International Karate + (1987) hack	1–3	C, D, N	The Dreams
Thrust Gold	2001	Thrust (1986) patch	1	N	Ninja/The Dreams
Snacks 4 Snakes	2002	Snakes clone	2–4	C	Protovision
Rampage Gold	2003	Rampage (1987) hack	1–3	C, D, N	The Dreams
Grubz (preview)	2004	Worms clone	2–4	C	Singular Crew
Hockey Mania	2004	original	2–4	C	Protovision
Marble Madness+	2004	Marble Madness (1986) hack	1–4	C	Nostalgia
Phong	2004	Pong clone	1–4	C, N	Instinct/Triad
Amazing Maze	2005	Amazing Maze (1983) hack	1–3	C	Triad
Team Patrol	2005	original	2–4	C	Protovision
Tour de France	2005	original	2–4	C	Hack n' Trade
Tanks 3000	2006	original	2–4	C	Protovision
Garrison	2007	Gauntlet (1986) hack	1–4	C, D	Nostalgia
Super Off Road+	2007	Super Off Road (1990) hack	1–3	C, D	Nostalgia
Alone in the Green	2009	original	1–4	C	Edikles
M.U.L.E.	2011	M.U.L.E. (1983) hack	1–4	C	Peiselulli
Space Lords	2011	Pong clone	1–4	C	P1X3L.net
Square Attack	2011	original	4	C	Prof. Pi^2
Icon Run	2012	original	?-4	C	Evil Joe
Bomberland	2013	Bomberman clone	1–4	C	Samar Productions (SMR)
Octron	2013	Tron clone	2–8	C+C	enthusi of Onslaught
Schlimeisch Mania	2013	Snakes clone	1–8	I	Unreal
Race	2014	Car race original	1–8	C, I	Sokrates
Tiger Claw	2014	Bruce Lee hack	1–4	C	Lazycow
Kim Pong	2015	Pong clone	1–4	C	Technische Maschinenfabrik
Jam It	2015	Basketball original	1–4	C	Throwback Games
Shotgun	2016	original	2–4	C	Dr. Wuro Industries
Snafu	2016	original	2–4	C	Megastyle and Protovision
Frogs	2017	original	2–4	C	Dr. Wuro Industries
Zatacka	2017	hack?	2–4	C	Rabenauge
Schlimeisch Mania II	2018	Snakes clone	1-8	I	Unreal
The Walking Death	2018	original	2-8	I	Unreal
Mashed Turtles	2018	original	2-8	C, M, I	Angelsoft
Space Moguls	2018	original	2-4	C, I, P	Protovision
Dice8	2018	original	2-8	I, M	Unreal
Bruce Lee - Return of Fury	2019	Bruce Lee clone	1-4	C	Protovision
Straight Up	2021	original	1-4	C, P	Dr. Wuro Industries

Adapter: S = Starbyte, C = Protovision / Classical Games, D = Digital Excess & Hitmen, N = Ninjas SNES pad, K = Kingsoft, B = Space Balls, I = Inception

Description: original/clone = new implementation, patch = patch for existing game, hack = unauthorized release based on existing game.

Interface origin: Publisher or official source of joystick adapter support. In order to use hacked versions legally, you should own the original game.
