= List of computer system emulators =

This article lists software and hardware that emulates computing platforms.

The host in this article is the system running the emulator, and the guest is the system being emulated.

The list is organized by guest operating system (the system being emulated), grouped by word length. Each section contains a list of emulators capable of emulating the specified guest, details of the range of guest systems able to be emulated, and the required host environment and licensing.

== 64-bit guest systems ==
=== ARM AArch64 ===
Emulator	Latest version	Released	Guest emulation capabilities	Host Operating System	License
QEMU	11.1.3	October 29, 2026	AArch64	Cross-platform	GPLv2

=== AlphaServer ===
Emulator	Latest version	Released	Guest emulation capabilities	Host Operating System	License
Charon-AXP	4.5	November 30, 2014	AlphaServer 4100, DS10, DS20, ES40, GS80, GS160, GS320	Windows, Linux	Commercial
Charon-AXP/SMA(+),/Station	2.2.39	November 20, 2013	AlphaServer 300, 800, 1000, 1200, 2000, 2100, 4000, 4100, DS10, DS20, DS25, ES40, ES45, 8200, 8400, AlphaStation 200, 250, 500, 600, DPW, XP1000, XP900, DMCC, DEC3000	Windows	Commercial
ES40 Emulator	0.18	March 14, 2008	AlphaServer ES40	Cross-platform	GPL
PersonalAlpha	2.0.17	March 1, 2008	AlphaServer	Windows	Freeware
vtAlpha	4.6.0	January 1, 2026	AlphaServer: All models AlphaStation: All models	Bare Metal installation, no host OS required. Any x86-64 host computer, Virtual Machine equivalent or Cloud.	Commercial
FreeAXP	2.6.4.598		AlphaServer 400	Windows	Freeware
Avanti	2.6.4.598		AlphaServer 400	Windows	Commercial
AlphaVM	1.4.11	March 14, 2014	AlphaServer DS10, DS20, ES40, and AlphaStation XP900, XP1000	Windows and Linux	Commercial and Freeware

=== IBM ===
Emulator	Latest version	Released	Guest emulation capabilities	Host Operating System	License
Hercules	3.12	November 30, 2015	System/370, ESA/390, z/Architecture	Cross-platform	QPL
QEMU	11.1.3	October 29, 2026	s390x	Cross-platform	GPLv2

=== RISC-V (riscv64) ===
Emulator	Latest version	Released	Guest emulation capabilities	Host Operating System	License
QEMU	11.1.3	October 29, 2026	aarch64	Cross-platform	GPLv2

=== Silicon Graphics ===
Emulator	Latest version	Released	Guest emulation capabilities	Host Operating System	License
GXemul	0.7.0	22 April 2021	SGI O2	Cross-platform	Open source

=== UltraSPARC ===
Emulator	Latest version	Released	Guest emulation capabilities	Host Operating System	License
Charon-SSP/E450	1.0.26	April 15, 2015	Sun Enterprise 450	Linux	Commercial
QEMU	11.1.3	October 29, 2026	Sun4u (UltraSPARC PC), Sun4v (T1 PC)	Cross-platform	GPL

=== x86-64 platforms (64-bit PC and compatible hardware) ===
Emulator	Latest version	Released	Guest emulation capabilities	Host Operating System	License
Bochs	3.1	August 23, 2026	x86 PC, x86-64 PC	Cross-platform	Open source
QEMU	11.1.3	October 29, 2026	x86-64 PC, various platforms	Cross-platform	GPL
Q	0.9.1d118		x86-64 PC, various platforms	OS X	Open source
SPC/AT	0.97	March 10, 2014	x86-64 PC, various platforms	Windows 64-bit, Android Linux (ARM)	Open source
SimNow	4.6.2	April 6, 2010	AMD K8 (Athlon 64 and Opteron) PC	Windows 64-bit, Linux 64-bit	Freeware and Proprietary

== 60-bit guest systems ==
=== 60-bit CDC 6000 series and Cyber mainframe ===
Emulator	Latest version	Released	Guest emulation capabilities	Host Operating System	License
Desktop Cyber	5.3.1	May 12, 2011	CDC Cyber, CDC 6000 series, CDC 6600	Cross-platform	GPL

== 48-bit guest systems ==
=== English Electric KDF9 ===
Emulator	Latest version	Released	Guest emulation capabilities	Host Operating System	License
ee9	V1.9e	December 15, 2011	English Electric KDF9	Cross-platform/POSIX API: binary for OS X on PowerPC	GPL3
ee9	V2.0r	October 29, 2015	English Electric KDF9	Cross-platform/POSIX API: binaries for 32-bit Intel Linux, Raspberry Pi, OS X Lion, and OS X Yosemite	GPL3
ee9	V3.1a	July 18, 2018	English Electric KDF9	Cross-platform/POSIX API: binary for 32-bit Windows with Cygwin	GPL3
ee9	V10	February 25, 2024	English Electric KDF9	Cross-platform/POSIX API: binary for 32-bit Raspberry Pi 4/400	GPL3
ee9	V19	September 1, 2025	English Electric KDF9	Cross-platform/POSIX API: binaries for 64-bit Raspberry Pi 4/400 or better, Intel macOS Mojave through macOS Tahoe, ARM macOS Tahoe, 64-bit ARM and Intel Linux (which also run under Windows 10/11 with WSL). Download includes the TSD OS, native ALGOL 60 compilers and paskal, a Pascal cross compiler for the KDF9.	GPL3

== 36-bit guest systems ==
=== DEC PDP-10 ===
Emulator	Latest version	Released	Guest emulation capabilities	Host Operating System	License
SIMH	v4.0		DEC PDP-10: PDP-6, KA10, KI10, KL10A/B, and various very old computers	Cross-platform	Open source
ts10	021004	October 4, 2002	DEC PDP-10, DEC PDP-11, DEC VAX	Unix, Linux	GPL
KLH10	2.0a	November 19, 2001	DEC PDP-10: KL10B and KS10	Unix, Linux	Open source
kx10	0.94	June 30, 2004	DEC PDP-10: KL10B	Unix, Linux	GPL

=== GE-600 series / Honeywell 6000 series ===
Emulator	Latest version	Released	Guest emulation capabilities	Host Operating System	License
DPS8M	R3.1.0	May 14, 2025	Honeywell Series‑60/Level‑68, Honeywell/Bull DPS‑8/M	Cross-platform	Open source

=== IBM 7094 ===
Emulator	Latest version	Released	Guest emulation capabilities	Host Operating System	License
SIMH	3.9-0	May 3, 2012	Various very old computers	Cross-platform	Open source
IBM 7094 Emulator	3.0d	September 16, 2004	IBM 7094	Windows	Open source
s709	3.2.5	January 4, 2012	IBM 709, IBM 7090, IBM 7094	Cross-platform	Open source

== 32-bit guest systems ==
=== Acorn Archimedes, A7000, Risc PC, Phoebe ===
While the ARM processor in the Acorn Archimedes is a 32-bit chip, it only had 26-bit addressing making an ARM/Archimedes emulator, such as Aemulor or others below, necessary for 26-bit compatibility, for later ARM processors have mostly dropped it.

Emulator	Latest version	Released	Guest emulation capabilities	Host Operating System	License
A310Emu	0.58	April 13, 2007	Acorn Archimedes	RISC OS	Freeware
Aemulor	2.32	March 9, 2003	Acorn Archimedes	RISC OS	Proprietary
Acorn-Pattenden	-	November 16, 1998	Acorn Archimedes	Windows	Freeware
ArcEm	1.50.2	April 16, 2017	Acorn Archimedes	Cross-platform	GPLv2
Archie	0.9	February 10, 2001	Acorn Archimedes	Windows	Freeware
ArchiEmu	0.01	March 6, 2010	Acorn Archimedes	RISC OS	Freeware
Arculator	0.99	August 15, 2009	Acorn Archimedes	Windows	Freeware
ARM 2	-	October 6, 1997	Acorn Archimedes	Windows	Freeware
Arthur OS Emulator	-	1998	Acorn Archimedes	Windows	Freeware
Red Squirrel	0.6	October 28, 2002	Acorn Archimedes	Windows	Freeware
Riscose		February 3, 2002	Acorn Archimedes	Windows	GPL
RPCEmu	0.9.3	May 7, 2020	Acorn A7000, Risc PC, Phoebe	Cross-platform	GPLv2
Virtual A5000	1.4	February 18, 2003	Acorn Archimedes	Windows	Commercial
VirtualRPC	-	February 9, 2003	Risc PC	Cross-platform	Commercial

=== Amiga ===
Emulator	Latest version	Released	Guest emulation capabilities	Host Operating System	License
E-UAE	0.8.29wip4	March 27, 2007	Amiga	Unix, OS X, BeOS	GPL
Fellow	0.5.7.1067	January 2, 2018	Amiga	Windows	GPL
FS-UAE	2.8.3	January 8, 2017	Amiga	Windows, OS X, Linux, FreeBSD	GPL
MAME (formerly MESS)	0.289	July 30, 2026	Various computers, consoles, and arcade systems	Cross-platform	New BSD, GPLv2 or later
MyUAE	0.91	August 24, 2006	Amiga	Palm OS	GPL
PalmUAE	1.0	September 12, 2006	Amiga	Palm OS	GPL
PocketUAE	20060121	January 21, 2006	Amiga	Pocket PC	GPL
UAE	0.8.29	UAE v0.8.29 2008-11-30, FS-UAE v2.6.2 2015-10-27, E-UAE v0.8.29 2007-03-28	Amiga	Unix, BeOS, NeXTSTEP	GPL
UAE4All	rc1	November 3, 2006	Amiga	Windows, Linux, Dreamcast, Dingoo	GPL
WinUAE	6.0.3	March 3, 2026	Amiga	Windows	GPL

=== Android ===
- BlueStacks
- Genymotion
- LeapDroid
- App Inventor for Android
- Android Studio
- MEmu
- Android-x86
- Nox App Player
- LDPlayer
- Windows Subsystem for Android

=== iOS ===
- touchHLE

=== Apple Lisa ===
Emulator	Latest version	Released	Guest emulation capabilities	Host Operating System	License
IDLE	0.11a	September 19, 2015	Apple Lisa	Windows	Open source
LisaEm	1.2.6	December 13, 2007	Apple Lisa	Mac OS X, Windows	GPL
MAME (formerly MESS)	0.289	July 30, 2026	Various computers, consoles, and arcade systems	Cross-platform	New BSD, GPLv2 or later

=== Macintosh with 680x0 CPU ===
Emulator	Latest version	Released	Guest emulation capabilities	Host Operating System	License
MAME (formerly MESS)	0.289	July 30, 2026	Various computers, consoles, and arcade systems	Cross-platform	New BSD, GPLv2 or later
Mini vMac	3.5.8	August 13, 2017	Macintosh Plus and other early Macintosh computers	Windows, Linux, OS X	GPL
PCE/macplus	20180323-184b521a	December 18, 2017	Macintosh 128k, Macintosh 512k, Macintosh 512Ke, Macintosh Plus, Macintosh SE, Macintosh Classic	Windows	GPLv2
Clock Signal (CLK)	2020-12-09	December 9, 2020	Macintosh 512ke and Macintosh Plus; also: Acorn Electron, Amstrad CPC, Apple II, Atari 2600, Atari ST, ColecoVision, VIC-20, MSX, Oric 1/Atmos, Master System, ZX80, ZX81	macOS, Linux, BSD	MIT License
Executor	2.1pr11	July 9, 2009	Macintosh	Windows, Linux, DOS	MIT License
vMac	0.1.9.6	1999	Macintosh Plus	Cross-platform	Open source
A-Max	4.0	Summer of 1993	Macintosh 128k, Macintosh 512k, Macintosh 512Ke, Macintosh Plus, Macintosh II, Macintosh Quadra	Amiga	Freeware
Basilisk II	0.9-1	May 31, 2001	Macintosh Classic, Macintosh II	Cross-platform	GPL
SoftMac XP	8.2	July 2001	Macintosh	Windows	
Fusion	3.0	July 1998	Macintosh	DOS	Freeware
Shoebill	0.0.5	September 15, 2015	Macintosh II, specifically meant to run A/UX	macOS, Linux, Windows	BSD
Snow	1.6.0	November 1, 2026	Macintosh 128k, Macintosh 512k, Macintosh 512Ke, Macintosh Plus, Macintosh SE, Macintosh Classic, Macintosh II, Macintosh SE/30, Macintosh IIx, Macintosh IIcx, Macintosh Portable, Macintosh LC, Macintosh LC II, Macintosh LC III	macOS, Linux, Windows	MIT

=== Macintosh with PowerPC CPU ===
Emulator	Latest version	Released	Guest emulation capabilities	Host Operating System	License
PearPC	0.5.0	July 13, 2011	PowerPC platform	Linux, Windows	GPL
SheepShaver		May 5, 2010	PowerMac	Cross-platform	GPL
QEMU	11.1.3	October 29, 2026	G3 Beige PowerMac, various platforms	Windows, Linux, OS X	GPL
GXemul	0.7.0	22 April 2021	Power Mac G4	Cross-platform	Open source

=== Atari ST/STE/Falcon ===
Emulator	Latest version	Released	Guest emulation capabilities	Host Operating System	License
STEEm	3.2	October 22, 2004	Atari ST/STE	Windows, Linux	Open source
SainT	2.40	December 12, 2015	Atari ST/STE	Windows	Freeware
Gemulator	9.0	November 30, 2008	Atari ST	Windows	Commercial (free)
Hatari	2.4.1	August 3, 2022	Atari ST/STE, Atari TT, Atari Falcon	Cross-platform	GPL
Clock Signal (CLK)	2020-12-09	December 9, 2020	Atari ST; also: Acorn Electron, Amstrad CPC, Apple II, Atari 2600, Atari ST, ColecoVision, VIC-20, Macintosh, MSX, Oric 1/Atmos, Master System, ZX80, ZX81	macOS, Linux, BSD	MIT License
PacifiST	0.49b	October 18, 2001	Atari ST	DOS, Windows	Giftware
STonX	0.6.7.6	August 15, 2004	Atari ST	Unix, DOS, Windows	GPL
WinSTon	0.1r2	August 16, 1998	Atari ST	Windows	Freeware
ARAnyM	1.1.0	April 14, 2019	Atari ST, Atari TT, Atari Falcon	Cross-platform	GPL
MAME (formerly MESS)	0.289	July 30, 2026	Various computers, consoles, and arcade systems	Cross-platform	New BSD, GPLv2 or later
EstyJs	n/a	2013	Atari ST	Cross-platform	Open source
PCE/atarist	20180323-184b521a	December 18, 2017	Atari ST, Mega ST	Windows	GPL
STEEm SSE (Steven Seagal Edition)	3.9.4	January 13, 2018	Atari ST/STE	Windows, Linux	GPL

=== AT&T UNIX PC ===
Emulator	Latest version	Released	Guest emulation capabilities	Host Operating System	License
FreeBee	FreeBee on GitHub	August 2019	UNIX PC	Cross-platform	GPLv3

=== Cobalt Qube ===
Emulator	Latest version	Released	Guest emulation capabilities	Host Operating System	License
GXemul	0.7.0	22 April 2021	Cobalt Qube	Cross-platform	Open source

=== Corel NetWinder ===
Emulator	Latest version	Released	Guest emulation capabilities	Host Operating System	License
GXemul	0.7.0	22 April 2021	NetWinder (ARM)	Cross-platform	Open source

=== DEC VAX ===
Emulator	Latest version	Released	Guest emulation capabilities	Host Operating System	License
SIMH	3.9-0	May 3, 2012	Various very old computers including DEC VAX 11/780, 3900	Cross-platform	Open source
Charon-VAX	4.0	December 28, 2010	DEC VAX	Windows	Commercial
eVAX	1.1	January 28, 2000	DEC VAX	Cross-platform	GPL
vtVAX	4.4.0	January 5, 2024	DEC VAX	X86 Bare Metal (no OS required), Virtual Machine, Cloud and Windows	Commercial

=== DECstation ===
Emulator	Latest version	Released	Guest emulation capabilities	Host Operating System	License
GXemul	0.7.0	22 April 2021	DECstation 5000/200	Cross-platform	Open source

=== IBM mainframe (32-bit) ===
Emulator	Latest version	Released	Guest emulation capabilities	Host Operating System	License
Hercules	3.12	November 30, 2015	System/370, ESA/390, z/Architecture	Cross-platform	QPL
SIMH		1993	System/360	Cross-platform	MIT

=== Motorola 88000 ===
Emulator	Latest version	Released	Guest emulation capabilities	Host Operating System	License
GXemul	0.7.0	22 April 2021	Motorola MVME187	Cross-platform	Open source

=== RISC-V (riscv32) ===
Emulator	Latest version	Released	Guest emulation capabilities	Host Operating System	License
QEMU	11.1.3	October 29, 2026	aarch64	Cross-platform	GPLv2

=== X68000 ===
Emulator	Latest version	Released	Guest emulation capabilities	Host Operating System	License
EX68	2.15	July 23, 2001	X68000	Windows	
MAME (formerly MESS)	0.289	July 30, 2026	Various computers, consoles, and arcade systems	Cross-platform	New BSD, GPLv2 or later
WinX68k	0.95	March 6, 2004	X68000	Windows	

=== Sinclair QL ===
Emulator	Latest version	Released	Guest emulation capabilities	Host Operating System	License
QLay2	0.90	November 7, 2004	Sinclair QL	Windows	Open source
Q-emuLator	3.1	January 29, 2012	Sinclair QL	Windows, Mac OS	Shareware
MAME (formerly MESS)	0.289	July 30, 2026	Various computers, consoles, and arcade systems	Cross-platform	New BSD, GPLv2 or later
QPC II	4.04	May 27, 2014	Sinclair QL	Windows	Freeware
ZEsarUX	12.0	January 16, 2025	Various Sinclair computers	Linux, Windows, Mac OS X, FreeBSD, Haiku	GPL

=== SPARCstation ===
Emulator	Latest version	Released	Guest emulation capabilities	Host Operating System	License
QEMU	11.1.3	October 29, 2026	SPARCstation, SPARCserver, various platforms	Windows, Linux, OS X	GPL
Charon-SSP/SS20 Freeware	0.3.8	March 31, 2013	SPARCstation 20	Linux	Freeware
TME	0.8		Sun 2/120, Sun 3/150, SPARCstation 2	Unix	BSD

=== x86 platforms (32-bit PC and compatible hardware) ===
Emulator	Latest version	Released	Guest emulation capabilities	Host Operating System	License
86Box	5.3	December 22, 2025	x86 PC	Cross-platform	GPLv2
Aeon	0.64	June 30, 2011	MS-DOS	.NET Framework 4.0	MS-PL
Bochs	3.1	August 23, 2026	x86 PC, x86-64 PC	Cross-platform	LGPL
Dioscuri	0.7.0	January 19, 2011	x86 PC	JVM	GPLv2
DOSBox	0.74-3	June 26, 2019	DOS & x86 PC	Cross-platform	GPLv2
jDosbox	0.74.28	February 27, 2013	DOS & x86 PC	JVM	GPLv2
JsDOSBox	3.3	January 10, 2016	DOS & x86 PC	Web browser (JavaScript)	GPLv2
NaClBox	CVS (follows DOSBox)		DOS & x86 PC	Google Native Client	GPLv2
JPC	3.0	February 22, 2015	x86 PC	JVM	GPLv2
MAME (formerly MESS)	0.289	July 30, 2026	Various computers, consoles, and arcade systems	Cross-platform	New BSD, GPLv2 or later
Microsoft Virtual PC for Mac	7.0	September 10, 2004	x86 PC	Mac OS, Mac OS X(Power PC)	Commercial
Parallels	13.3.0-43321	March 16, 2018	x86 PC virtualizer	Cross-platform	Commercial
PCem	v17	August 15, 2007	x86 PC	Windows, Linux	GPLv2
PCgems	1.0	October 18, 2026	x86 PC	Windows	GPLv2
PocketDOS	1.12.3	August 8, 2009	x86 PC Intel 8086/80186/80286 (real-mode only), 386/486 with 3rd party plugins	Windows, Windows CE/Pocket PC	Commercial
Q	0.9.1d118	February 16, 2010	x86 PC, various platforms	OS X	GPL
QEMU	11.1.3	October 29, 2026	x86 PC, various platforms	Cross-platform	GPL
SimNow	4.6.2	April 6, 2010	AMD K8 (Athlon 64 and Opteron) PC	Windows 64-bit, Linux 64-bit	Freeware and Proprietary
SPC/AT Emulator	0.97	March 10, 2014	x86 PC	Windows	Freeware
VARCem	1.7.3	June 6, 2020	x86 PC	Windows	GPLv2
VirtualBox	6.1.26	July 28, 2021	x86 PC virtualizer	Cross-platform	GPL
VMachine	0.1.0	October 10, 2010	x86 PC	Windows	Custom
VMware Fusion	10.1.1	January 11, 2018	x86 PC virtualizer	OS X	Commercial
VMware Workstation	14.1.1	January 11, 2018	x86 PC virtualizer	Windows, Linux	Commercial
Windows Virtual PC			x86 PC virtualizer	Windows	Custom

== 24-bit guest systems ==
=== ICL 1900 ===
Emulator	Latest version	Released	Guest emulation capabilities	Host Operating System	License
g3ee	140223	February 23, 2014	ICL 1900 series mainframe running George 3	Windows, Raspberry Pi, Linux	GPL3
sims	bbe8a62	April 8, 2018	Burroughs B5500, ICL 1900 series, DEC PDP-10, others	Cross-platform	Open source
em1900	V1.01	December 31, 2018	ICL 1900 series 1901A, 1905 and 1904S processors	Windows	Open source

=== SDS 900-series ===
Emulator	Latest version	Released	Guest emulation capabilities	Host Operating System	License
SIMH	V3.9-0	May 3, 2013	SDS 940	Cross-platform	Open source

== 20-bit guest systems ==
=== GE-200 series ===
Emulator	Latest version	Released	Guest emulation capabilities	Host Operating System	License
Dartmouth Time-Sharing System Emulator			GE-235	Cross-platform	

=== PERQ ===
Emulator	Latest version	Released	Guest emulation capabilities	Host Operating System	License
PERQemu	0.25	June 24, 2010	PERQ 1, PERQ 1A	Windows	

== 18-bit guest systems ==
=== DEC PDP-1 ===
Emulator	Latest version	Released	Guest emulation capabilities	Host Operating System	License
SIMH	V3.9-0	May 3, 2013	Various very old computers	Cross-platform	Open source
Java PDP-1 emulator		October 9, 2009	PDP-1	Java applet	Open source
JavaScript PDP-1 emulator		2013	PDP-1	Web browser (JavaScript)	Open source

=== DEC PDP-4/7/9/15 ===
Emulator	Latest version	Released	Guest emulation capabilities	Host Operating System	License
SIMH	V3.9-0	May 3, 2013	Various very old computers	Cross-platform	Open source

== 16-bit guest systems ==
=== Apple IIGS ===
Emulator	Latest version	Released	Guest emulation capabilities	Host Operating System	License
MAME (formerly MESS)	0.289	July 30, 2026	Various computers, consoles, and arcade systems	Cross-platform	New BSD, GPLv2 or later
GSPlus (Based on KEGS)	0.14	March 27, 2019	Apple IIGS	Cross-platform	GPLv2
XGS	0.54	December 8, 2002	Apple IIGS	Cross-platform	GPL
XGS-DOS	0.50.6	1998	Apple IIGS	DOS	Freeware
XGS/32	1.60b	March 7, 2000	Apple IIGS	Windows	
KEGS	1.34	January 14, 2024	Apple IIGS	Cross-platform	GPL
Bernie II The Rescue	3.0	December 1996	Apple II, Apple IIGS	Power Macintosh	Shareware
Bernie Unleashed	2.0.6	November 19, 2026	Apple II, Apple IIGS	macOS	Freeware
Sweet16	3.0.3	March 6, 2014	Apple IIGS	macOS	Freeware

=== NEC PC-9800 series ===
Emulator	Latest version	Released	Guest emulation capabilities	Host Operating System	License
Neko Project II	0.86	March 6, 2006	PC-9801	Windows, macOS	Freeware

=== DEC PDP-11 ===
Emulator	Latest version	Released	Guest emulation capabilities	Host Operating System	License
Ersatz-11	7.1	August 7, 2015	DEC PDP-11	DOS, Windows, Linux	Shareware
ts10	021004	October 4, 2002	DEC PDP-10, DEC PDP-11, DEC VAX	Unix, Linux	GPL
SIMH	3.9-0	May 3, 2012	Various very old computers	Cross-platform	Open source
Charon TB	4.0	January 11, 2011	PDP-11/94 (UNIBUS), MicroVAX II, MicroVAX 3600, MicroVAX 3600, VAX Server 3600, VAX Server 3600, VAX 4000/106, VAX 6000/310	Windows	Commercial

=== Mera 400 ===
Polish minicomputer Mera 400. Also in development hardware emulator in FPGA.

Emulator	Latest version	Released	Guest emulation capabilities	Host Operating System	License
EM400			Mera 400	Linux	GPL-2.0

=== TI-99/4 and TI-99/4A ===
Emulator	Latest version	Released	Guest emulation capabilities	Host Operating System	License
MAME	0.289	July 30, 2026	Various computers, consoles, and arcade systems	Cross-platform	New BSD, GPLv2 or later
Classic99	v398	September 4, 2017	TI-99/4A	Windows	Open source
Ti994w	4.2a	May 19, 2009	TI-99/4A	Windows	Freeware
Win994a	3.010	April 2, 2013	TI-99/4A	Windows	Freeware

=== Texas Instruments TI-980 ===
Emulator	Latest version	Released	Guest emulation capabilities	Host Operating System	License
sim980	1.3.4	January 12, 2012	TI-980 A and B, Calder CDD-980	Cross-platform	Open source

=== Texas Instruments TI-990 ===
Emulator	Latest version	Released	Guest emulation capabilities	Host Operating System	License
sim990	3.4.0	October 26, 2011	TI-990/4, /5, /10, /10A and /12	Cross-platform	Open source

=== Varian Data Machines ===
Emulator	Latest version	Released	Guest emulation capabilities	Host Operating System	License
VVM (Virtual Varian Machine)	1.0.0	June 2, 2006	Varian 620i	DOS	Commercial

=== x86-16 IBM PC/XT/AT compatible ===
Emulator	Latest version	Released	Guest emulation capabilities	Host Operating System	License
86Box	5.3	December 22, 2025	x86 PC	Cross-platform	GPLv2
Fake86	0.13.9.16	September 16, 2013	IBM PC/XT & Intel 80186	Cross-platform	GPLv2
PCE/ibmpc	20180323-184b521a	December 18, 2017	IBM PC/XT, 8086, 80186/80188	Windows	GPLv2
Pico XT	0.1.1	October 24, 2006	IBM PC/XT	Windows	Freeware
PCem	v17	January 13, 2022	x86 PC	Windows, Linux	GPLv2
PCjs	v1.62.0	April 1, 2018	x86 PC	Web browser	GPLv3
PocketDOS	1.12.3	August 8, 2009	x86 PC Intel 8086/80186/80286 (real-mode only)	Windows, Windows CE/Pocket PC	Commercial
DOSBox	0.74-3	June 26, 2019	DOS & x86 PC	Cross-platform	GPLv2
jDosbox	0.74.28	February 27, 2013	DOS & x86 PC	JVM	GPLv2
JsDOSBox	3.3	January 10, 2016	DOS & x86 PC	Web browser (JavaScript)	GPLv2
NaClBox	CVS (follows DOSBox)		DOS & x86 PC	Google Native Client	GPLv2
QEMU	11.1.3	October 29, 2026	x86 PC	Cross-platform	GPL
VirtualXT	0.9.0	June 1, 2021	IBM PC/XT	Cross-platform	ZLIB License
MartyPC	v0.2.0	May 31, 2023	IBM PC/XT	Cross-platform	MIT License

== 12-bit guest systems ==
=== DEC PDP-8 ===
Emulator	Latest version	Released	Guest emulation capabilities	Host Operating System	License
SIMH	V3.9-0	May 3, 2013	Various very old computers	Cross-platform	Open source
PDP-8/E Simulator	2.6.1	September 24, 2025	PDP-8/E	Mac OS, macOS	GPL
core8	v1.0	July 28, 2023	PDP-8/E	Windows, Linux	GPLv3

== 8-bit guest systems ==
=== Acorn Atom ===
Emulator	Latest version	Released	Guest emulation capabilities	Host Operating System	License
Acorn Atom Emulator	1.33	August 14, 1999	Acorn Atom	DOS	Open source
Acorn Atom Emulator	0.3	February 11, 1997	Acorn Atom	Linux, SunOS	GPL
Atomulator	1.28	March 28, 2018	Acorn Atom	Windows, Linux, macOS	GPL
jsAtom	2022-08-09	August 9, 2022	Acorn Atom	Web browser (JavaScript)	GPL
MAME (formerly MESS)	0.289	July 30, 2026	Various computers, consoles, and arcade systems	Cross-platform	New BSD, GPLv2 or later

=== Acorn Electron ===
Emulator	Latest version	Released	Guest emulation capabilities	Host Operating System	License
6502Em	4.00	February 4, 2005	BBC Micro, BBC Master, Acorn Electron	Windows, RISC OS	Commercial
Clock Signal (CLK)	2020-12-09	December 9, 2020	Acorn Electron; also: Amstrad CPC, Apple II, Atari 2600, Atari ST, ColecoVision, VIC-20, Macintosh, MSX, Oric 1/Atmos, Master System, ZX80, ZX81	macOS, Linux, BSD	MIT License
ElectrEm	0.6c	January 18, 2007	Acorn Electron	Windows, macOS, Linux	Open source
Elkulator	1.0	July 17, 2010	Acorn Electron	Windows, DOS, Linux	GPL
ElkJS	n/a	2013	Acorn Electron	Cross-platform	Open source
MAME (formerly MESS)	0.289	July 30, 2026	Various computers, consoles, and arcade systems	Cross-platform	New BSD, GPLv2 or later

=== Altair 8800 ===
Emulator	Latest version	Released	Guest emulation capabilities	Host Operating System	License
MAME (formerly MESS)	0.289	July 30, 2026	Various computers, consoles, and arcade systems	Cross-platform	New BSD, GPLv2 or later
Z80pack	1.36	December 21, 2017	Altair 8800, IMSAI 8080, Cromemco Z-1	Cross-platform	BSD
SIMH	3.9-0	May, 2012	Altair 8800 with various hardware	Cross-platform	Open source
emuStudio	0.39	March, 2017	Altair 8800 and other computers + basic IDE	Cross-platform	GPLv2

=== Amstrad CPC ===
Emulator	Latest version	Released	Guest emulation capabilities	Host Operating System	License
AmeDS	4.0	April 25, 2010	Amstrad CPC	Nintendo DS	Freeware
Arnold	04012004	January 4, 2004	Amstrad CPC, Amstrad Plus, GX4000	Windows, Mac, Linux	GPL
Azimuth	1.x	March 4, 2022	Amstrad CPC	Android	GPL
CaPriCe32	4.6.0	March 14, 2020	Amstrad CPC	DOS, Windows, Linux	GPL
Clock Signal (CLK)	2020-12-09	December 9, 2020	Amstrad CPC; also: Acorn Electron, Apple II, Atari 2600, Atari ST, ColecoVision, VIC-20, Macintosh, MSX, Oric 1/Atmos, Master System, ZX80, ZX81	macOS, Linux, BSD	MIT License
CPC++	2.0.0	January 14, 2003	Amstrad CPC	Mac OS X, Mac OS, Linux, Solaris	Shareware
CPCBox	beta	November 12, 2012	Amstrad CPC	Web browser (JavaScript)	Freeware
CPCDroid	1.5.1	March 2, 2011	Amstrad CPC	Android	GPL
CPCE	1.94	March 7, 2011	Amstrad CPC	DOS, Windows	Freeware
CPCemu	2.5	August 13, 2022	Amstrad CPC	Windows, Linux	Freeware
CrocoDS	0.1.1	October 15, 2016	Amstrad CPC	macOSX, iPhone/iPad, Nintendo DS	GPL
DSP-emulator	0.18 Final	December 31, 2017	Amstrad CPC, Arcade, ColecoVision, Game Boy, Game Boy Color, Nintendo, ZX Spectrum	Windows, Linux	Non-commercial
EP128Emu	2.0.11.2	April 19, 2019	Amstrad CPC, ZX Spectrum, Enterprise	Windows, Linux	GPL
JavaCPC	3.0.2	April 8, 2022	Amstrad CPC	Java	GPL
MacCPC	0.9.2 Alpha	January 22, 2010	Amstrad CPC	OS X	Freeware
MAME (formerly MESS)	0.289	July 30, 2026	Various computers, consoles, and arcade systems	Cross-platform	New BSD, GPLv2 or later
NO$CPC	1.8	November 2000	Amstrad CPC, Amstrad Plus, GX4000	DOS, Windows	Freeware
PSPCAP32	1.5.1	August 21, 2009	Amstrad CPC	Sony PSP	GPL
Retro Virtual Machine	2.1.9	October 9, 2023	Amstrad CPC, Amstrad Plus, GX4000, MSX, Sega SG-1000, Sega Master System, ColecoVision, Sinclair ZX Spectrum	Windows, macOS, Linux	Apache
Roland	beta	April 20, 2011	Amstrad CPC	Web browser (JavaScript)	GPL
Roland Emulator	0.70	April 20, 2017	Amstrad CPC	Windows, Linux, FreeBSD	GPL
Virtual CPC	1.1	August 8, 2011	Amstrad CPC	Windows	Freeware
WinAPE	2.0b2	January 6, 2016	Amstrad CPC, Amstrad Plus, GX4000	Windows	Freeware
WinCPC	0.9.26	February 1, 2007	Amstrad CPC	Windows	Freeware
Wiituka	0.98.8	May 15, 2009	Amstrad CPC	Nintendo Wii	GPL
Xcpc	beta	January 22, 2007	Amstrad CPC	Linux and FreeBSD	GPL
XNACPC	1.0	November 11, 2011	Amstrad CPC	Xbox 360, Windows	GPL
ZEsarUX	12.0	January 16, 2025	Various Sinclair computers	Linux, Windows, Mac OS X, FreeBSD, Haiku	GPL

=== Apple I ===
Emulator	Latest version	Released	Guest emulation capabilities	Host Operating System	License
MAME (formerly MESS)	0.289	July 30, 2026	Various computers, consoles, and arcade systems	Cross-platform	New BSD, GPLv2 or later
OpenEmulator	1.0.3	July 17, 2012	Various computers and consoles	Cross-platform	GPL
Pom1	v1.0.0	March 3, 2010	Apple I	Cross-platform	GPL
Pom1 (Java)	1.1	May 23, 2007	Apple I	Java	GPL
Rittwage Apple 1 Emulator			Apple I	Windows	Open source

=== Apple II ===
Emulator	Latest version	Released	Guest emulation capabilities	Host Operating System	License
Agat Emulator	1.29.1	November 6, 2017	Apple II, Agat 7, Agat 9	Windows	GPL
AppleIIGo	1.0.8	June 14, 2011	Apple IIe	Cross-platform	GPL
Appler	52aaa0f	January 1, 1990	Apple II	DOS	BSL
AppleWin	1.29.13.0	May 31, 2020	Apple II, Apple II+, Apple IIe	Windows	GPL
Catakig	2.00b4	October 28, 2006	Apple II, Apple II+, Apple IIe, Apple IIc	macOS	Open source
Clock Signal (CLK)	2020-12-09	December 9, 2020	Apple II, Apple II+, Apple IIe; also: Acorn Electron, Amstrad CPC, Atari 2600, Atari ST, ColecoVision, VIC-20, Macintosh, MSX, Oric 1/Atmos, Master System, ZX80, ZX81	macOS, Linux, BSD	MIT License
JACE: Java Apple Computer Emulator	2012-12-09	December 9, 2012	Apple II, Apple IIe	Cross-Platform	LGPL
LinApple	2b	June 26, 2015	Apple II	Linux	GPL
MAME (formerly MESS)	0.289	July 30, 2026	Various computers, consoles, and arcade systems	Cross-platform	New BSD, GPLv2 or later
microM8	Rolling	January 14, 2017	Apple IIe	Windows Linux macOS	Freeware
PalmApple	0.8.0	September 8, 2006	Apple IIe	Palm OS	GPL
pomDS	2.0	November 30, 2008	Apple II	Nintendo DS	Freeware
Virtu	0.9.3	July 17, 2012	Apple IIe	Cross-platform	GPL
Virtual ] [	8.1	January 14, 2018	Apple II, Apple II+, Apple IIe	Mac OS X 10.6 "Snow Leopard" or better	Shareware
WiiApple	0.0.7	January 8, 2009	Apple II	Wii	GPL

=== Apple /// ===
Emulator	Latest version	Released	Guest emulation capabilities	Host Operating System	License
MAME (formerly MESS)	0.289	July 30, 2026	Various computers, consoles, and arcade systems	Cross-platform	New BSD, GPLv2 or later
Sara	0.5.0	May 4, 2008	Apple ///	Mac OS, OS X	Freeware

=== Atari 8-bit computers ===
Emulator	Latest version	Released	Guest emulation capabilities	Host Operating System	License
A8E	0.2	November 15, 2007	Atari 800XL	Windows	GPL
ACE	0.3	2001	Atari 800, Atari 800XL, Atari 130XE	Linux	Open source
Altirra	4.00	November 13, 2021	Atari 400, Atari 800, Atari 800XL, Atari 130XE, Atari 5200	Windows	GPL
Atari800Win PLus	4.0	August 26, 2005	Atari 400, Atari 800, Atari 800XL, Atari 130XE, Atari 5200	Windows	GPL
Atari800	3.1.0	August 4, 2014	Atari 400, Atari 800, Atari 800XL, Atari 130XE, Atari 5200	Cross-platform	GPL
Atari800	2.1.0	March 15, 2010	Atari 400, Atari 800, Atari 800XL, Atari 130XE, Atari 5200	Dingoo	GPL
Atari800	1.2 for GP, 1.5 for Pandora	December 2007	Atari 400, Atari 800, Atari 800XL, Atari 130XE, Atari 5200	GP32, GP2X, Gizmondo, Pandora (console)	GPL
Atari800 DC	0.78	August 17, 2008	Atari 400, Atari 800, Atari 800XL, Atari 130XE, Atari 5200	Dreamcast	GPL
Atari800MacX	5.0.1	December 29, 2011	Atari 400, Atari 800, Atari 800XL, Atari 130XE, Atari 5200	Mac OS X	GPL
Atari800 PSP	2.1.0.1	August 11, 2009	Atari 400, Atari 800, Atari 800XL, Atari 130XE, Atari 5200	PSP	GPL
AtariXLBox	7	May 9, 2008	Atari 400, Atari 800, Atari 800XL, Atari 130XE, Atari 5200	Xbox	GPL
Atari++	1.81	December 15, 2016	Atari 400, Atari 800, Atari 800XL, Atari 130XE, Atari 5200	Cross-platform	Custom, GPL
EMUAPC	0.92	August 20, 2003	Atari 400, Atari 800, Atari 800XL, Atari 130XE	DOS	Commercial
kat5200	0.8.1	January 1, 2018	Atari 400, Atari 800, Atari 800XL, Atari 130XE, Atari 5200	Windows, Linux	GPL
Rainbow	2.2	August 25, 2012	Atari 400, Atari 800, Atari 800XL, Atari 130XE, Atari 5200	Windows, Mac OS, OS X	Freeware
MAME (formerly MESS)	0.289	July 30, 2026	Various computers, consoles, and arcade systems	Cross-platform	New BSD, GPLv2 or later
NAAE	1.0	2002	Atari 800, Atari 800XL, Atari 130XE, Atari 5200	Windows	Freeware
Pokey	0.62	September 10, 1996	Atari 800, Atari 800XL, Atari 5200	DOS	Freeware
PokeyDS	1.1	November 9, 2007	Atari 400, Atari 800, Atari 800XL, Atari 130XE, Atari 5200	Nintendo DS	GPL
WiiXL	0.1	February 7, 2009	Atari 400, Atari 800, Atari 800XL, Atari 130XE, Atari 5200	Wii	GPL
Xformer	10.00	October 10, 2018	Atari 400, Atari 800, Atari 800XL, Atari 130XE	Atari ST, DOS, Windows, OS/2	Freeware
XL-it!	0.20	1997	Atari 800, Atari 800XL, Atari 130XE	DOS	Freeware

=== BBC Micro ===
Emulator	Latest version	Released	Guest emulation capabilities	Host Operating System	License
6502Em	4.03	May 2005	BBC Micro, BBC Master, Acorn Electron	RISC OS	Commercial
65C12	1.1	November 4, 1998	BBC Micro	DOS	Freeware
65Host	1.20	May 18, 1992	BBC Micro	RISC OS	Commercial
B-Em	2.2	June 3, 2012	BBC Micro	DOS, Windows, OS X, Linux	GPL
BBC 6502 Emulator	-	February 15, 1992	BBC Micro	DOS/Windows	Freeware
BBC Environment Emulator	1.01AR	1985	BBC Micro	Atari 520 ST	Freeware
Beebdroid	1.3	February 17, 2012	BBC Micro	Android	
BeebEm	4.14	February 13, 2012	BBC Micro, BBC Master 128	Cross-platform	GPL
BeebInC	0.99f	1998	BBC Micro	DOS	Freeware
BeebIt	0.65	September 20, 2015	BBC Micro	RISC OS	Freeware
BeebItJ	1.03	November 7, 2007	BBC Micro	RISC OS	Freeware
Beebjit	0.9.4	2018	BBC Micro, BBC Master 128	Linux	GPLv3
Horizon	2.1	September 3, 2012	BBC Micro	Windows, OS X	Freeware
jsbeeb	-	2014	BBC Micro	Web browser (JavaScript)	GPL
Jbeeb	1.2	2004	BBC Micro	Java Applet	Freeware
MAME (formerly MESS)	0.289	July 30, 2026	Various computers, consoles, and arcade systems	Cross-platform	New BSD, GPLv2 or later
Model-B		April 10, 2004	BBC Micro	Windows	Open source
Owl	1.1.0		BBC Micro	NeXTStep	Freeware
Xbeeb	0.4.1	January 15, 2002	BBC Micro	Unix	Open source

=== Commodore 64 ===
Emulator	Latest version	Released	Guest emulation capabilities	Host Operating System	License
MAME (formerly MESS)	0.289	July 30, 2026	Various computers, consoles, and arcade systems	Cross-platform	New BSD, GPLv2 or later
MagiC64	1.81	January 13, 1999	Commodore 64	Amiga	Shareware
C64S	2.5B	February 28, 1997	Commodore 64	DOS	Shareware
PC64Dos	1.22	September 1, 1997	Commodore 64	DOS	Freeware
PC64Win	2.14	January 15, 1997	Commodore 64	Windows	Freeware
VICE	3.6	December 24, 2021	Commodore 64, Commodore 128, VIC-20, Commodore PET, Plus/4, CBM-II	Cross-platform	GPL
PSPVice	1.2	January 2008	Commodore 64	Sony PSP	Freeware
VICE PSP	2.2.15	January 16, 2011	Commodore 64	Sony PSP	GPL
CCS64	3.10	May 14, 2025	Commodore 64	Windows	Shareware
Frodo	4.1b		Commodore 64	Cross-platform	GPL
Frodo (Mac)	4.4.0		Commodore 64	OS X	Freeware
FrodoDS			Commodore 64	Nintendo DS	GPL
Hoxs64	1.0.9.8	February 4, 2018	Commodore 64	Windows	Freeware
Micro64	1.00.2013.05.11 Build 714	May 11, 2013	Commodore 64	Windows Linux OS X	Freeware
Hyper64	1.00.2008.08.08 Build 20	August 8, 2008	Commodore 64	Windows	Freeware
JME C64	1.13	October 2, 2009	Commodore 64	Java	GPL
ec64	0.17	December 21, 2003	Commodore 64	Linux	GPL
VirtualC64	1.8.1	March 23, 2018	Commodore 64	OS X	GPL
Jac64	1.11	January 4, 2008	Commodore 64	Java	GPL
FC64			Commodore 64	Adobe Flash	GPL
Commodore 64	1.6	April 3, 2010	Commodore 64	iPhone	Commercial
A64	3.01	1994	Commodore 64	Amiga	Commercial
rCC64	0.6.0.0	December 14, 2014	Commodore 64	Windows Phone	Commercial
Flappy 64	1.2	October 27, 2014	Commodore 64, VIC-20	Java	Freeware
Kernal64	1.4.3.b1	March 3, 2018	Commodore 64, Commodore 128	Java/Scala	MIT License
Z64K	Beta	April 7, 2018	Commodore 64	Java	Freeware
caio emulator		January 28, 2024	Commodore 64, Sinclair ZX80, Sinclair ZX Spectrum 48K, NES	Linux, macOS	GPL
C64 Mister	20240418	2019	Commodore 64	MiSTer	GPL
C64 READY.	2026.8.29	2026	Commodore 64	Cross platform	GPL

=== Plus/4 ===
Emulator	Latest version	Released	Guest emulation capabilities	Host Operating System	License
MAME (formerly MESS)	0.289	July 30, 2026	Various computers, consoles, and arcade systems	Cross-platform	New BSD, GPLv2 or later
Forever?	1.42	August 25, 2008	Commodore 16, Commodore 116, Plus/4	DOS	Open source
Artifex	0.29	March 14, 2002	Commodore 16, Plus/4	Windows	Freeware
Minus4	1.5	November 21, 2008	Commodore 16, Commodore 116, Plus/4	Java	Open source
plus4emu	1.2.9.2	September 26, 2008	Commodore 16, Commodore 116, Plus/4	Windows, Linux	GPL
VICE	3.6	December 24, 2021	Commodore 64, Commodore 128, VIC-20, Commodore PET, Plus/4, CBM-II	Cross-platform	GPL
WinEMU	0.50	September 12, 2001	Commodore 16, Plus/4	Windows	Freeware
YAPE	1.1.6	March 18, 2018	Commodore 16, Plus/4	Cross-platform	GPL

=== VIC-20 ===
Emulator	Latest version	Released	Guest emulation capabilities	Host Operating System	License
Clock Signal (CLK)	2020-12-09	December 9, 2020	VIC-20; also: Acorn Electron, Amstrad CPC, Apple II, Atari 2600, Atari ST, ColecoVision, Macintosh, MSX, Oric 1/Atmos, Master System, ZX80, ZX81	macOS, Linux, BSD	MIT License
MAME (formerly MESS)	0.289	July 30, 2026	Various computers, consoles, and arcade systems	Cross-platform	New BSD, GPLv2 or later
Pfau Zeh	0.26	February 11, 2000	VIC-20	Linux, Windows	Freeware
Power20	4.9.5	February 29, 2008	VIC-20	Mac OS, OS X	Shareware
vic20emu	0.1-b3	October 27, 2013	VIC-20	Java	BSD
VICE	3.6	December 24, 2021	Commodore 64, Commodore 128, VIC-20, Commodore PET, Plus/4, CBM-II	Cross-platform	GPL
Z64K	Beta	April 7, 2018	Commodore 64, VIC-20, Atari 2600	Java	Freeware

=== Enterprise 64/128 ===
Emulator	Latest version	Released	Guest emulation capabilities	Host Operating System	License
MAME (formerly MESS)	0.289	July 30, 2026	Various computers, consoles, and arcade systems	Cross-platform	New BSD, GPLv2 or later
Enter		September 19, 2001	Enterprise	Windows	GPL
EP32	1.20	July 11, 2006	Enterprise	Windows	GPL
EP128Emu	2.0.11	January 20, 2017	Amstrad CPC, ZX Spectrum, Enterprise	Windows, Linux	GPL

=== Fairlight CMI IIx ===
Emulator	Latest version	Released	Guest emulation capabilities	Host Operating System	License	Notes
MAME (formerly MESS)	0.289	July 30, 2026	Various computers, consoles, and arcade systems	Cross-platform	New BSD, GPLv2 or later	Preliminary support, not available in official builds

=== Jupiter Ace ===
Emulator	Latest version	Released	Guest emulation capabilities	Host Operating System	License
MAME (formerly MESS)	0.289	July 30, 2026	Various computers, consoles, and arcade systems	Cross-platform	New BSD, GPLv2 or later
EightyOne	1.0a	May 28, 2008	Jupiter Ace, Various Sinclair computers	Windows	GPL
ZEsarUX	12.0	January 16, 2025	Various Sinclair computers	Linux, Windows, Mac OS X, FreeBSD, Haiku	GPL
zzace	09		Jupiter Ace	Java	Open source
MAce	0.9.0		Jupiter Ace	OS X	Freeware
xAce	0.5	December 22, 2012	Jupiter Ace	Linux	GPL
EMF Jupiter Ace	1.0	June 15, 2020	Jupiter Ace	Web browser (JavaScript)	Unknown
Jupiter Ace	1.1.1	April 2, 2023	Jupiter Ace	iOS, iPadOS	Freeware

=== Mattel Aquarius ===
Emulator	Latest version	Released	Guest emulation capabilities	Host Operating System	License
MAME (formerly MESS)	0.289	July 30, 2026	Various computers, consoles, and arcade systems	Cross-platform	New BSD, GPLv2 or later
Virtual Aquarius	0.72a	August 5, 2008	Mattel Aquarius	Windows	Freeware

=== MicroBee ===
Emulator	Latest version	Released	Guest emulation capabilities	Host Operating System	License
MAME (formerly MESS)	0.289	July 30, 2026	Various computers, consoles, and arcade systems	Cross-platform	New BSD, GPLv2 or later
Nanowasp	2.0b	September 28, 2007	MicroBee	Windows	GPL
uBee512	6.0.0	February 13, 2017	MicroBee	Cross-platform	GPL

=== MSX ===
Emulator	Current version	Released	Guest emulation capabilities	Host Operating System	License
blueMSX	2.8.2	August 14, 2009	MSX, MSX2, MSX2+, MSX TurboR, SpectraVideo SVI318/328, ColecoVision, Sega SG-1000	Windows	GPL
CocoaMSX	1.61	August 5, 2017	MSX, MSX2, MSX2+, MSX TurboR	OS X	GPL
Clock Signal (CLK)	2020-12-09	December 9, 2020	MSX1; also: Acorn Electron, Amstrad CPC, Apple II, Atari 2600, Atari ST, ColecoVision, VIC-20, Macintosh, Oric 1/Atmos, Master System, ZX80, ZX81	macOS, Linux, BSD	MIT License
fMSX	5.3	March 27, 2018	MSX, MSX2, MSX2+	Cross-platform	Commercial
fMSX PSP	3.5.41	March 17, 2010	MSX, MSX2, MSX2+	Sony PSP	Open source
MAME (formerly MESS)	0.289	July 30, 2026	Various computers, consoles, and arcade systems	Cross-platform	New BSD, GPLv2 or later
meisei	1.3.1	February 9, 2010	MSX	Windows	Open source
MSKISS	0.2.4	March 13, 2000	MSX, MSX2, MSX2+	DOS, Windows	Freeware
MSX Emulator	0.10b	October 26, 2006	MSX	Atari ST	Freeware
MSX Emulator	1.8	August 16, 2010	MSX, MSX2	UNIX	GPL
msxDS	0.93	January 1, 2012	MSX, MSX2, MSX2+	Nintendo DS	Freeware
NLMSX	0.48	June 12, 2003	MSX, MSX2, MSX2+, MSX TurboR	Windows	Freeware
NO$MSX	1.5	May 1, 2003	MSX, MSX2	Windows, DOS	Shareware
openMSX	18.0	June 12, 2022	MSX, MSX2, MSX2+, MSX TurboR, SpectraVideo SVI318/328, ColecoVision, Sega SG-1000	Cross-platform	GPLv2
paraMSX	0.50b	October 8, 2009	MSX, MSX2, MSX2+, MSX TurboR	Windows	Freeware
rMSX	1.3	April 1, 2016	MSX, MSX2	MSX tR	Freeware
RuMSX	0.82	June 18, 2017	MSX, MSX2, MSX2+, MSX TurboR	Windows	Freeware
jsMSX	beta	December 29, 2011	MSX	Web browser (JavaScript)	GPL
WebMSX	6.0	March 15, 2020	MSX, MSX2, MSX2+, MSX TurboR, OPL4, V9990 with Dual Screens, Network Multiplayer/Sharing	Web browser (JavaScript)	Open source
ZEsarUX	12.0	January 16, 2025	Various Sinclair computers	Linux, Windows, Mac OS X, FreeBSD, Haiku	GPL
TMSX	beta	December 14, 2015	MSX	Java	Open source

=== NEC PC-8800 series ===
Emulator	Latest version	Released	Guest emulation capabilities	Host Operating System	License
M88	2.21A	November 11, 2003		Windows	Freeware
MAME (formerly MESS)	0.289	July 30, 2026	Various computers, consoles, and arcade systems	Cross-platform	New BSD, GPLv2 or later
QUASI88	0.6.4	March 29, 2013		FreeBSD, Linux	BSD
X88000	1.5.1	August 10, 2016		Windows, Linux	Public Domain

=== Oric computers ===
Emulator	Latest version	Released	Guest emulation capabilities	Host Operating System	License
Clock Signal (CLK)	2020-12-09	December 9, 2020	Oric 1, Oric Atmos, including Pravetz 8-DOS; also: Acorn Electron, Amstrad CPC, Apple II, Atari 2600, Atari ST, ColecoVision, VIC-20, Macintosh, MSX, Master System, ZX80, ZX81	macOS, Linux, BSD	MIT License
DSoric	1.0	January 19, 2008	Oric 1, Oric Atmos	Nintendo DS	Freeware
Consolatoric	r6	January 16, 2009	Oric 1, Oric Atmos	Windows	GPL
Euphoric	1019	November 21, 2014	Oric 1, Oric Atmos, Telestrat	DOS, Windows	Freeware
Xeuphoric	0.19.0	August 26, 2010	Oric 1, Oric Atmos, Telestrat	Unix	GPL
MAME (formerly MESS)	0.289	July 30, 2026	Various computers, consoles, and arcade systems	Cross-platform	New BSD, GPLv2 or later
Oric	1.7.8		Oric 1, Oric Atmos	Mac OS	Freeware
Oricutron	1.2	December 14, 2014	Oric 1, Oric Atmos	Amiga, OS X, MorphOS, Windows, Haiku	GPL
PocketOric	0.2	September 24, 2002	Oric 1, Oric Atmos	Pocket PC	Freeware

=== SAM Coupé ===
Emulator	Latest version	Released	Guest emulation capabilities	Host Operating System	License
MAME (formerly MESS)	0.289	July 30, 2026	Various computers, consoles, and arcade systems	Cross-platform	New BSD, GPLv2 or later
SimCoupe	1.0	May 9, 2007	SAM Coupé	Cross-platform	GPL
PSPSIM	1.2.1	January 27, 2008	SAM Coupé	PSP	GPL
ZEsarUX	12.0	January 16, 2025	Various Sinclair computers	Linux, Windows, Mac OS X, FreeBSD, Haiku	GPL

=== Sharp MZ ===
Emulator	Latest version	Released	Guest emulation capabilities	Host Operating System	License
Sharp MZ-800 Emulator	1.04	September 16, 2018	Sharp MZ-800	Windows, Linux	GPL
MAME (formerly MESS)	0.289	July 30, 2026	Various computers, consoles, and arcade systems	Cross-platform	New BSD, GPLv2 or later
MZ-80B Emulator	2.97		Sharp MZ-80B	Windows	Freeware
Mz800em	0.8.1	January 28, 2002	Sharp MZ-800	Windows, Linux	GPL
MZ-800 Emulator	0.099 Alpha	January 17, 2014	Sharp MZ-800	Windows	Commercial

=== Sinclair ZX80 ===
Emulator	Latest version	Released	Guest emulation capabilities	Host Operating System	License
Clock Signal (CLK)	2020-12-09	December 9, 2020	Acorn Electron, Amstrad CPC, Apple II, Atari 2600, Atari ST, ColecoVision, VIC-20, Macintosh, MSX, Oric 1/Atmos, Master System, ZX80, ZX81	macOS, Linux, BSD	MIT License
EightyOne	1.28	May 28, 2008	Various Sinclair computers	Windows	GPL
MAME (formerly MESS)	0.289	July 30, 2026	Various computers, consoles, and arcade systems	Cross-platform	New BSD, GPLv2 or later
XTender	1.28	May 2008	Sinclair ZX80, Sinclair ZX81	DOS	Shareware
sz81	2.1.7	February 13, 2011	Sinclair ZX80, Sinclair ZX81	Cross-platform	GPL
z81	2.1	October 1, 2004	Sinclair ZX80, Sinclair ZX81	Linux	GPL
ZEsarUX	12.0	January 16, 2025	Various Sinclair computers	Linux, Windows, Mac OS X, FreeBSD, Haiku	GPL
NO$ZX81	1.1	April 2001	Sinclair ZX80, Sinclair ZX81	DOS, Windows	Freeware
ZX80 Emulator		March 10, 2010	Sinclair ZX80	Web browser (JavaScript)	Freeware
ZX81 - iOS	1.13.0	May 15, 2023	Sinclair ZX80, Sinclair ZX81	iOS, iPadOS	Freeware
caio emulator		January 28, 2024	Commodore 64, Sinclair ZX80, Sinclair ZX Spectrum 48K, NES	Linux, macOS	GPL

=== Sinclair ZX81 ===
Emulator	Latest version	Released	Guest emulation capabilities	Host Operating System	License
Clock Signal (CLK)	2020-12-09	December 9, 2020	Acorn Electron, Amstrad CPC, Apple II, Atari 2600, Atari ST, ColecoVision, VIC-20, Macintosh, MSX, Oric 1/Atmos, Master System, ZX80, ZX81	macOS, Linux, BSD	MIT License
EightyOne	1.28	May 28, 2008	Various Sinclair computers	Windows	GPL
MAME (formerly MESS)	0.289	July 30, 2026	Various computers, consoles, and arcade systems	Cross-platform	New BSD, GPLv2 or later
NO$ZX81	1.1	April 2001	Sinclair ZX80, Sinclair ZX81	DOS, Windows	Freeware
sz81	2.1.7	February 13, 2011	Sinclair ZX80, Sinclair ZX81	Cross-platform	GPL
VB81	1.30		Sinclair ZX81	Windows	GPL
XTender	1.28	May 2008	Sinclair ZX80, Sinclair ZX81	DOS	Shareware
ZEsarUX	12.0	January 16, 2025	Various Sinclair computers	Linux, Windows, Mac OS X, FreeBSD, Haiku	GPL
z81	2.1	October 1, 2004	Sinclair ZX80, Sinclair ZX81	Linux	GPL
PSPZX81	1.2.0	February 24, 2008	Sinclair ZX81	PSP	GPL
ZX81			Sinclair ZX81	Java	
JtyOne Online ZX81 Emulator		2015	Sinclair ZX81	Web browser (JavaScript)	GPL
ZX81 - iOS	1.13.0	May 15, 2023	Sinclair ZX80, Sinclair ZX81	iOS, iPadOS	Freeware

=== Sinclair ZX Spectrum and clones ===
For Sinclair ZX Spectrum and clones

	Latest version	Released	Guest emulation capabilities	Host Operating System	License
MAME (formerly MESS)	0.289	July 30, 2026	Various computers, consoles, and arcade systems	Cross-platform	New BSD, GPLv2 or later
ZEsarUX	12.0	January 16, 2025	Various Sinclair computers	Linux, Windows, Mac OS X, FreeBSD, Haiku	GPL
EP128Emu	2.0.11	January 20, 2017	Amstrad CPC, ZX Spectrum, Enterprise	Windows, Linux	GPL
Fuse	1.6.0	February 28, 2021	ZX Spectrum 16K, 48K, 128K, +2, +2A, +3, TC2048, TC2068, TS2068, SE, Pentagon, Scorpion ZS-256	Cross-platform	GPLv2
Fuse For Mac OS X	1.5.2	April 1, 2018	ZX Spectrum 16K, 48K, 128K, +2, +2A, +3	OS X	GPL
Fuse PSP	0.10.0.21	April 7, 2009	ZX Spectrum 16K, 48K, 128K, +2, +2A, +3	Sony PSP	GPL
FBZX	3.8.0	April 6, 2017	ZX Spectrum 16K, 48K, 128K, +2, +2A	Linux	GPL
EightyOne	1.0a	May 28, 2008	Various Sinclair computers	Windows	GPL
Spectacol (based on Fuse)	1.5.2.0	March 2, 2019	ZX Spectrum 16K, 48K, 128K, +2, +2A, +3	Android	GPLv3+
Speccy	4.7 for Windows and Linux, 1.7 for others	March 29, 2018	ZX Spectrum 48K, 128K, +2, +2A, +3, TC2048, TC2068, TS2068	Windows, Linux, Android>v2.2, Symbian S60 (deprecated), DOS (deprecated)	Payware for Android, Freeware for others
Warajevo	2.52	February 2006	ZX Spectrum 48K, 128K, +2, Timex Sinclair 2068	DOS	GPL
X128	0.95b open alpha	July 5, 2010	ZX Spectrum 48K, 128K, +2, +2A, +3, Pentagon, Scorpion ZS-256, ATM Turbo, ZX81	DOS, Windows	Freeware
UnrealSpeccy	0.38.3	December 21, 2016	ZX Spectrum 48/128K, Pentagon, Scorpion ZS-256, ATM Turbo, Kay 1024, Profi	Windows	Public Domain
UnrealSpeccy Portable	0.0.81	December 26, 2017	ZX Spectrum 48K, 128K	Cross-platform	GPL
Z80Stealth	1.23	August 20, 2014	ZX Spectrum 128K, Pentagon, Scorpion ZS-256, Profi, Kay 1024; perfect AY-3-8912/YM2149F and General Sound emulation	Windows	Freeware
EmuZWin	2.7 release 2.8 (final)	March 10, 2006	ZX Spectrum 48K, 128K, +2, +2A, +3, Pentagon, Scorpion ZS-256 (patrial), ATM Turbo, Profi	Windows	Freeware
EMUZ		March 31, 1996	ZX Spectrum 48/128K with TR-DOS	DOS	Freeware with C-- Sphinx source code
Z.com		November 25, 2003	ZX Spectrum 48/128K	DOS	Freeware with MMX assembler source code
ZXDS	1.3.3		Spectrum 48K, 128K, Pentagon	Nintendo DS	Freeware
SpeccyDS	0.3	August 27, 2007	Spectrum 48K	Nintendo DS	Giftware
JX-Speccy	1.6	March 31, 2005	ZX Spectrum 48K, 128K	Java	GPL
Qaop/Java	1.3	February 2, 2011	ZX Spectrum 48K	Java applet	GPL
Qaop/JS	20110908	September 8, 2011	ZX Spectrum 48K, 128K	Web browser (JavaScript)	
MobileZX	0.8.61	May 31, 2009	ZX Spectrum 48K	Java ME	GPL
JSSpeccy	20091121	November 21, 2009	ZX Spectrum 48K	Web browser (JavaScript)	GPL
jBacteria	20100828	August 28, 2010	ZX Spectrum 16K, 48K, 128K, +2, +2A	Web browser (JavaScript)	GPL
Hob	20130131	January 31, 2013	ZX Spectrum 16K, 48K	Java	Freeware
JSpeccy	v0.93.1	August 8, 2015	ZX Spectrum 48K, 128K, +2A, ULAplus	Java	Freeware
GoSpeccy	0.7.0	May 21, 2011	ZX Spectrum 48K	Linux+Go	MIT License
ZX Spin by Paul Dunn	0.7q	May 21, 2010	ZX Spectrum 48K	Windows	Freeware
BASin by Paul Dunn	15.8	May 21, 2010	ZX Spectrum 48K with Integrated Development Environment (IDE)	Windows	Freeware
DSP-emulator	0.18 Final	December 31, 2017	Amstrad CPC, Arcade, ColecoVision, Game Boy, Game Boy Color, Nintendo, ZX Spectrum	Windows, Linux	Non-Commercial
RealSpectrum	14B "Finale" (v0.97.26)	November 6, 2004	ZX Spectrum 16K, 48K, 128K, +2, +2A, +3, Didaktik Kompakt, Pentagon 128K/512K and Scorpion 256K	DOS	Freeware
RealSpectrum (RS32)	15 "10th Anniversary" (v0.98.14)	December 31, 2009	ZX Spectrum 16K, 48K, 128K, +2, +2A, +3, Didaktik Kompakt, Pentagon 128K/512K and Scorpion 256K	Windows	Freeware
ZX	v1.0	2021	ZX Spectrum 16k, 48k, 128k, +2, +2A, +3	JVM	Open source
caio emulator		January 28, 2024	Commodore 64, Sinclair ZX80, Sinclair ZX Spectrum 48K, NES	Linux, macOS	GPL

=== Tandy 1000 ===
Emulator	Latest version	Released	Guest emulation capabilities	Host Operating System	License
86Box	4.2.1	September 1, 2024	x86 PC	Cross-platform	GPLv2
DOSBox	0.74-3	June 26, 2019	386, 486, Pentium, Tandy 1000, IBM PCjr	Cross-platform	GPL
MAME (formerly MESS)	0.289	July 30, 2026	Various computers, consoles, and arcade systems	Cross-platform	New BSD, GPLv2 or later
Tand-Em	0.55	March 18, 1999	Tandy 1000, IBM PCjr	DOS	Freeware

=== Thomson MO5 ===
Emulator	Latest version	Released	Guest emulation capabilities	Host Operating System	License
MAME (formerly MESS)	0.289	July 30, 2026	Various computers, consoles, and arcade systems	Cross-platform	New BSD, GPLv2 or later
DCMOTO	2018.03.17	March 17, 2018	Thomson TO7, TO7/70, TO8, TO8D, TO9, TO9+, Thomson MO5, MO5E, MO5NR, MO6, T9000, Olivetti Prodest PC128	Windows	Freeware
Teo	1.7.6	November 2006	Thomson TO8	DOS, Windows, Linux	GPL
Thom	1.5.5	December 2003	Thomson MO5	DOS, Windows, Linux	GPL
ThomDS	3.0	March 21, 2010	Thomson MO5	Nintendo DS	Freeware
PSPMO5	1.2.0	March 22, 2009	Thomson MO5	PSP	GPL
PSPTHOM	1.2.1	November 9, 2008	Thomson TO7	PSP	GPL

=== TRS-80 ===
Emulator	Latest version	Released	Guest emulation capabilities	Host Operating System	License
MAME (formerly MESS)	0.289	July 30, 2026	Various computers, consoles, and arcade systems	Cross-platform	New BSD, GPLv2 or later
Mocha	1.34	March 6, 2007	Tandy TRS-80 CoCo	Java applet	
SDLTRS	1.1.0	February 15, 2010	TRS-80 Model I/III/4/4P	Cross-platform	Open source
Sharp 80	1.1.0.99	April 20, 2017	TRS-80 Model III	Windows	Open source
TRS32	1.28	August 20, 2013	TRS-80 Model I/III/4/4P	Windows	Shareware
Virtual MC-10	0.73c	May 2008	TRS-80, TRS-80 MC-10, Matra Alice	Windows	Freeware
Vcc	1.42	August 13, 2010	Tandy TRS-80 CoCo 3	Windows	Freeware
Virtual T	1.7	April 7, 2015	TRS-80 Model 100/102/200	Cross-platform	Open source
XRoar	0.35.2	November 27, 2018	Tandy TRS-80 CoCo 1 & 2, Dragon 32/64	Cross-platform	Open source
xtrs	4.9d	June 15, 2009	TRS-80 Model I/III/4/4P	Unix	Open source

== PDA and smartphone guest systems ==
=== Pocket PC ===
Emulator	Latest version	Released	Guest emulation capabilities	Host Operating System	License
Microsoft Device Emulator	3.0	January 21, 2008	ARM-based device running Windows CE or Windows Mobile	Windows XP, 2003, and later	

== Calculator guest systems ==
=== Hewlett-Packard calculators ===
Emulator	Latest version	Released	Guest emulation capabilities	Host Operating System	License
Emu48	1.60	January 23, 2018	HP38G, HP39G, HP40G, HP48SX, HP48GX, HP49G	Windows	GPL
m48+	1.1	August 1, 2010	HP38G, HP39G, HP48SX, HP48GX, HP49G	iPhone	GPL
Nonpareil	0.79	August 23, 2008	Almost all models before HP48	Unix	GPL
PSPX48	1.1.0	October 7, 2007	HP48	PSP	GPL
x48	0.4.0	July 13, 2001	HP48 S/SX/G/GX	Unix	GPL

=== Texas Instruments calculators ===
Emulator	Latest version	Released	Guest emulation capabilities	Host Operating System	License
DS85	r2	October 15, 2006	TI-85	Nintendo DS	GPL
jsTIfied	1.0.0	January 2, 2013	TI-83+, TI-83+SE, TI-84+, TI-84+SE	Windows, Linux, OS X, more (browser-based)	Freeware
PSPXTI	1.3.0	April 19, 2009	TI-92	PSP	GPL
TI-nSpire Emulator (CAS and non-CAS)	0.26 GTK	March 23, 2010	TI-nspire CAS	Windows, Linux	Freeware
TiEmu	3.03	May 30, 2009	TI-89, TI-89 Titanium, TI-92, TI-92+, Voyage 200	Windows, Linux, OS X	GPL
TilEm	2.0	June 8, 2012	TI-73, TI-82, TI-83, TI-83+, TI-83+ SE, TI-84+, TI-84+ SE, TI-85, TI-86	Linux	Open source
Virtual TI	2.5b5	March 19, 2000	TI-82, TI-83, TI-83+, TI-85, TI-86, TI-89, TI-92, TI-92 II, TI-92+	Windows	Open source
Wabbitemu	v1.9.5.21	November 19, 2017	TI-73, TI-81, TI-82, TI-83, TI-83+(SE), TI-84+(SE), TI-84+CSE, TI-85, TI-86	Windows, OS X, Android	
Firebird Emu	1.4	November 4, 2017	Nspire Models	Windows, OS X, Linux, Android, iOS	GPLv3

== See also ==
- Comparison of platform virtualization software
- List of emulators
- List of video game console emulators
- List of compatibility layers such as WINE, Cygwin and Executor
