= MDE =

MDE may refer to:

== Education ==
- Master of Distance Education (MDE), a graduate degree offered by Athabasca University, Canada
- Maryland Department of Education, a state agency of Maryland, US
- Michigan Department of Education, a state agency of Michigan, US
- Minnesota Department of Education, a state agency of Minnesota, US
- Mississippi Department of Education, a state agency of Mississippi, US

== Organizations ==
- Maryland Department of the Environment, a state agency of Maryland, US that implements and enforces environmental protection laws and programs

== Science ==
- Major depressive episode
- Methylenedioxyethylamphetamine, a psychoactive drug
- Mid-domain effect spatial/area hypotheses to explain Latitudinal gradients in species diversity
- Methylenedioxyephedrone also known as MDE

== Technology ==
- Model-driven engineering, the systematic use of models as primary engineering artifacts
- Multi-disciplinary Engineering, an extrapolated version of systems engineering
- In Microsoft Access, mde, the file extension for protected (compiled) databases
- Microsoft Device Emulator, an emulator for Windows Mobile-based devices
- Mitsubishi Design Europe, the design studio of Mitsubishi Motors Europe

== Other uses ==
- Million Dollar Extreme, a comedy sketch group
- Maximum Downside Exposure, values the maximum downside to the portfolio
- Markit Document Exchange, platform used by financial market participants for distribution of account onboarding or KYC documents
- José María Córdova International Airport (IATA code: MDE), an airport in Colombia
- Major Deegan Expressway in New York City
