= Sundell =

Sundell may refer to:

== Places ==
- Sundell, Michigan, an unincorporated community in Rock River Township, Michigan

== People with the surname ==
- Harri Sundell, Finnish decathlete, winner of the Finnish national championship in 1984
- Jalen Sundell (born 1999), American football player
- Leif Sundell, Swedish soccer referee
- Ola Sundell, Swedish politician
- Per Håkan Sundell, Swedish programmer
- Serena Sundell (born 2003), American basketball player
