= MOS Technology 6581 =

MOS Technology sound chip

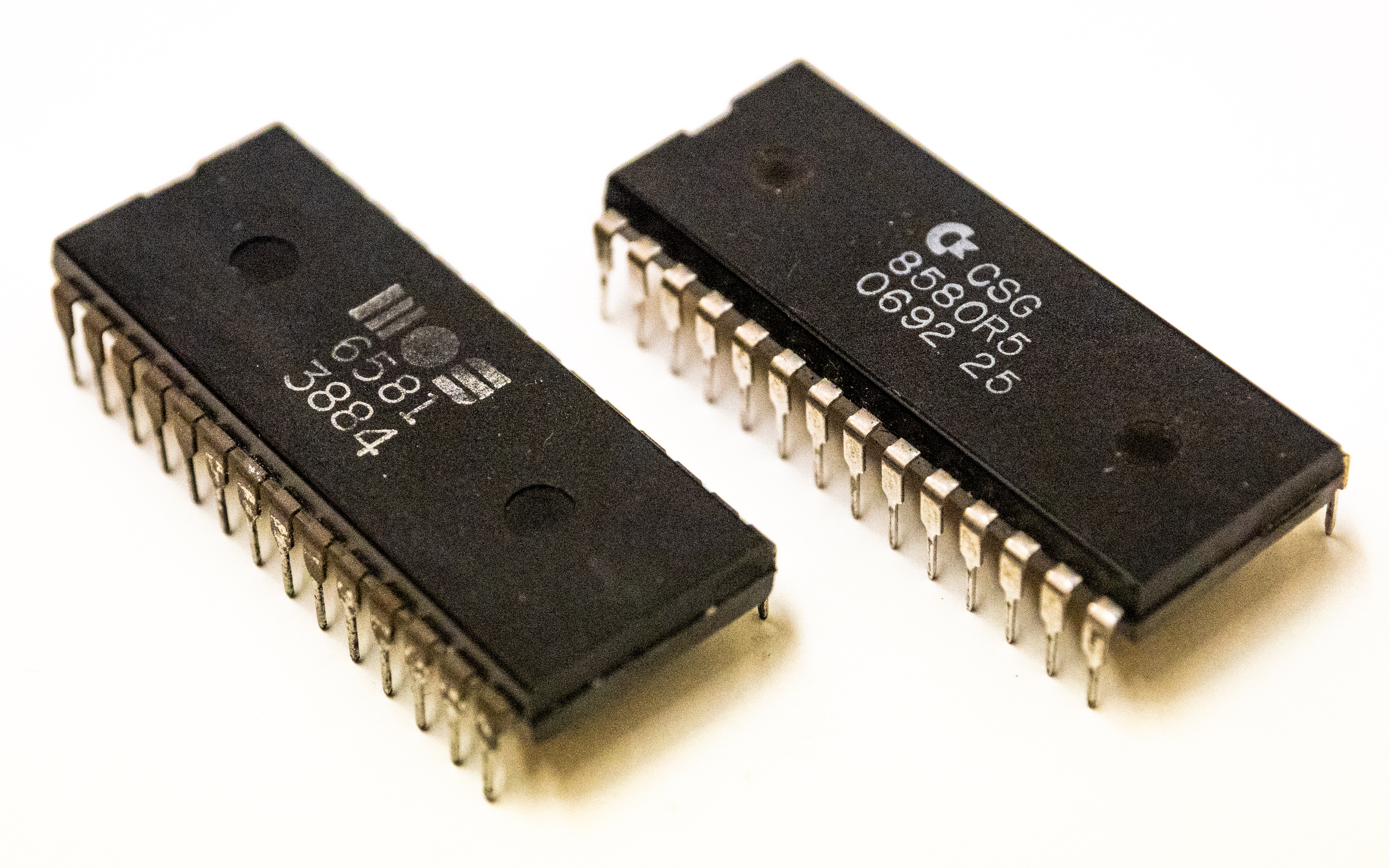
MOS Technology SIDs. The left chip is a 6581. The right chip is an 8580. CSG stands for Commodore Semiconductor Group. The numbers 3884 and 0692 are in WWYY form, i.e. the chips were produced week 38 of 1984 and week 06 of 1992. The last number is assumed to be a batch number.

The MOS Technology 6581/8580 SID (Sound Interface Device) is the built-in programmable sound generator chip of the Commodore 64, Commodore CBM-II, Commodore 128, and MAX Machine home computers. Together with the VIC-II graphics chip, the SID was instrumental in making the C64 the best-selling home computer in history, and is partly credited for initiating the demoscene.

The SID was an advanced design for the era, compared to competing sound chips like Atari's POKEY or the widely used General Instrument AY-3-8910 and Texas Instruments SN76489. In contrast to those chips, which were aimed at producing simple sound effects and music for games and similar purposes, the SID is better described as a single-chip music synthesizer. It included common synthesizer features like ADSR envelope controls, the ability to modulate channels with each other, and filters. These features allowed the SID to produce more complex sounds and music than other home computers of the time.

The original version of the SID, the 6581, was introduced with the C64 in 1982. It had a number of design features that were not well implemented due to time constraints, which resulted in various oddities in the output. Many of these were addressed in the later 8580 revision (sometimes labelled 6582), which took over from the original 6581 around 1986 and was used in later machines. The 8580 was produced until around 1992.

In the spring of 1983, the designer of the SID, Bob Yannes, left Commodore and would later go on to produce digital synthesizers at his new company, Ensoniq.

== History ==
The SID was devised by engineer Bob Yannes, who later co-founded the Ensoniq digital synthesizer and sampler company. Yannes headed a team that included himself, two technicians and a CAD operator, who designed and completed the chip in five months in the latter half of 1981. Yannes was inspired by previous work in the synthesizer industry and was not impressed by the current state of computer sound chips. Instead, he wanted a high-quality instrument chip, which is the reason why the SID has features like the envelope generator.

I thought the sound chips on the market, including those in the Atari computers, were primitive and obviously had been designed by people who knew nothing about music.

— Robert Yannes, On the Edge: The Spectacular Rise and Fall of Commodore

Emphasis during chip design was on high-precision frequency control. The SID was originally designed to have 32 independent voices, sharing a common wavetable lookup scheme that would be time multiplexed. However, these features could not be finished in time, so instead the mask work for a single oscillator was simply replicated three times across the chip's surface, creating three voices each with its own oscillator. Another feature that was not incorporated in the final design was a frequency look-up table for the most common musical notes, a feature that was dropped because of space limitations. The support for an audio input pin was a feature Yannes added without asking, which in theory would have allowed the chip to be used as a simple effect processor. The masks were produced in 7-micrometer technology to gain a high yield; the state of the art at the time was 6-micrometer technologies.

The chip, like the first product using it (the Commodore 64), was finished in time for the Consumer Electronics Show in the first weekend of January 1982. Even though Yannes was partly displeased with the result, his colleague Charles Winterble said: "This thing is already 10 times better than anything out there and 20 times better than it needs to be."

The specifications for the chip were not used as a blueprint. Rather, they were written as the development work progressed, and not all planned features made it into the final product. Yannes claims he had a feature list of which three quarters made it into the final design. The later 8580 revision was revised to more closely match the specifications for existing features. The most notable changes between the 6581 and 8580 are the behavior of the filter and the result of selecting multiple waveform types on a single voice.

== Design ==
6581/6582/8580R5 Pin configuration

The SID is a mixed-signal integrated circuit, featuring both digital and analog circuitry. All control ports are digital, while the output ports are analog. The system is programmed using a 5-bit address bus that selects a processor register, and then reading or writing that register over an 8-bit data bus.

The SID features three voices, each with an ADSR envelope for volume control and four basic waveform types selectable: triangle, sawtooth, pulse (with variable duty cycle), and pseudorandom noise. Various complex waveforms can be produced by selecting multiple waveform types (other than noise) at the same time. Voices may also be ring modulated or hard synced with each other.

Each voice may be routed into an analog filter with digitally controlled cutoff and resonance, which is constructed with aid of external capacitors to the chip. The filter has low-pass, band-pass, and high-pass modes which may be individually selected or combined. An external audio-in port enables external audio to be passed through the filter.

Since the SID's release, programmers have discovered various ways to precisely manipulate the SID at very high speeds via software to make it do things it was not designed to do, such as produce additional voices and play back digital samples. These techniques come at the cost of vastly increased CPU and memory usage, and some are incompatible with the 8580 model, so they are not often used.

== Features ==
- Three separately programmable independent audio oscillators (0.0625–4095.9375 Hz range on a 1 MHz clock)
- Four distinct waveforms per audio oscillator (triangle, sawtooth, pulse, noise). Any combination of triangle, sawtooth, and pulse may be selected at the same time to produce additional waveforms.
- One multi-mode filter featuring low-pass, high-pass and band-pass outputs with 6 dB/oct (bandpass) or 12 dB/octave (lowpass/highpass) rolloff. The different filter modes may be combined to produce additional timbres, for instance a notch-reject filter.
- Three attack/decay/sustain/release (ADSR) volume envelope controls, one for each audio oscillator
- Three ring modulators
- Oscillator sync for each audio oscillator
- Two 8-bit analog-to-digital converters (typically used for game control paddles, but later also used for a mouse)
- External audio input (for sound mixing with external signal sources)
- Random number/modulation generator (via reading the state of the 3rd oscillator or 3rd envelope generator)

== Revisions ==
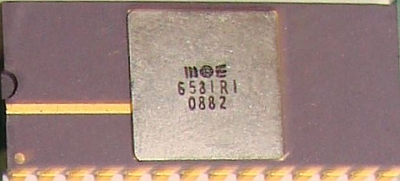
6581R1 produced in 1982

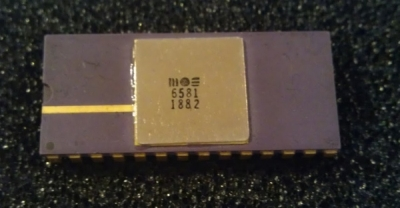
6581 produced in 1982

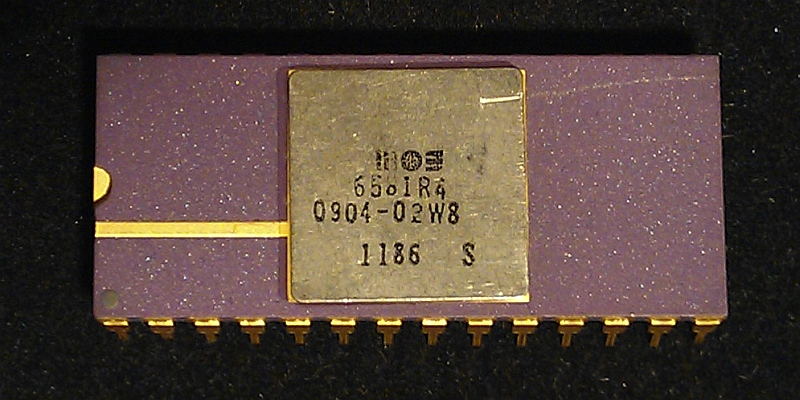
6581R4 CDIP produced in 1986

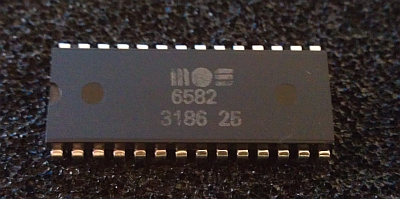
6582 produced in 1986

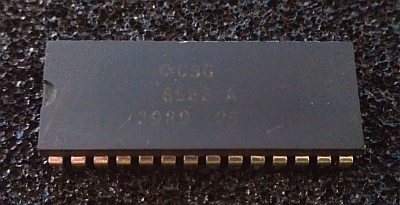
6582A produced in 1989

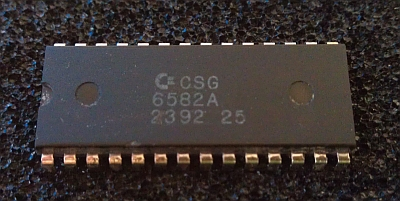
6582A produced in 1992

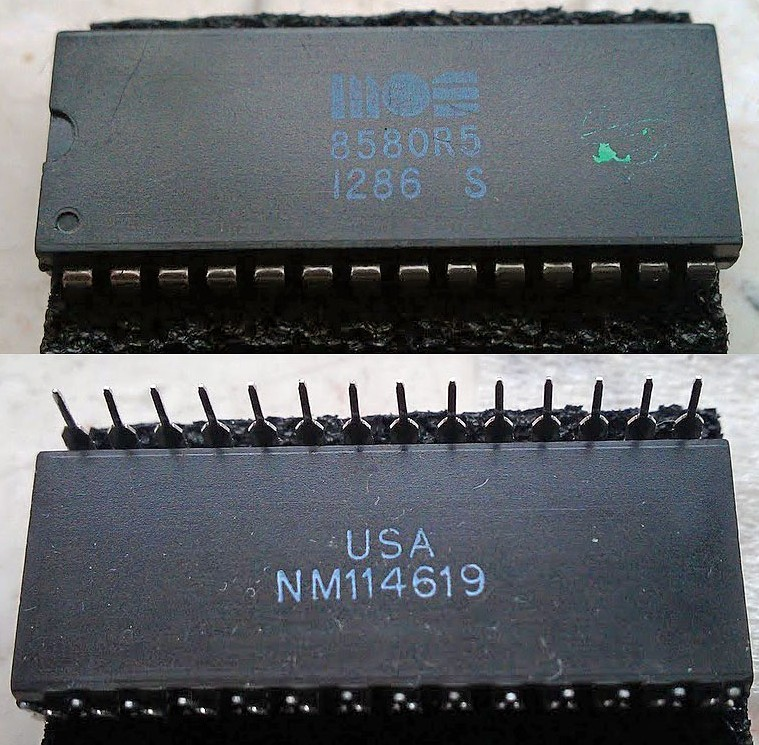
8580R5 produced 1986 in the U.S.

The SID chip had two models produced during its production lifetime: the 6581 and the 8580.

The first model of the SID chip, the 6581, was manufactured and included in Commodore 64 machines between 1982 and around 1986. This model underwent several revisions. Revision R1 was a prototype which was only seen in CES machines and development prototypes that never made it to market. Following R1 were revisions R2, R3, R4 AR, and R4. No substantial alterations were made between these revisions, only minor changes to the protection/buffering of the input pins, adjustment of the silicon grade, and changes to packaging.

The updated 8580 model, labeled as revision R5, was introduced in newer Commodore 64 machines starting around 1986. While technically compatible with the 6581, the 8580 has different sound characteristics than the 6581 due to significant adjustments to its design and manufacturing.

The 6581 and 8580 models differ from each other in several ways. The original 6581 was manufactured using the older NMOS process, which used 12V DC to operate. The 8580 was made using the HMOS-II process, which requires less power (9V DC), and therefore makes the IC run cooler. The 8580 is thus far more durable than the 6581. The 6581's filter has a non-linear cutoff range, varies wildly between chips, and often distorts, while the 8580's filter has a linear cutoff range, is more consistent between chips, is nearly distortion-free, and can achieve higher resonances. The 8580's combined waveforms are also louder and clearer than the 6581's. A better separation between the analog and the digital circuits made the 8580's output less noisy and distorted overall.

Some 8580 chips are marked "CSG" (Commodore Semiconductor Group) with the Commodore logo, while others are marked "MOS". Many are also labelled as the "6582" despite being the exact same chip as the 8580. The markings of chips varied by factory, and even by line within a factory, throughout most of the manufacturing run of the chip.

== Remarking and forgery ==
Since 6581 and 8580 SID ICs are no longer produced, they have become highly sought after. In late 2007, various defective chips started appearing on eBay as supposedly "new". Some of these remarked SIDs have a defective filter, but some also have defective channels/noise generators, and some are completely dead.

Fake SID chips have also been supplied to unwitting buyers from unscrupulous manufacturers in China; the supplied chips are laser-etched with completely bogus markings, and the chip inside the package is not a SID at all.

== Uses ==
=== Game audio ===
The majority of games produced for the Commodore 64 made use of the SID chip, with sounds ranging from simple clicks and beeps to complex musical extravaganzas or even entire digital audio tracks. Due to the technical mastery required to implement music on the chip, and its versatile features compared to other sound chips of the era, composers for the Commodore 64 have described the SID as a musical instrument in its own right. Most software did not use the full capabilities of SID, however, because the incorrect published specifications caused programmers to only use well-documented functionality. Some early software, by contrast, relied on the specifications, resulting in inaudible sound effects.

Well known composers of game music for this chip are Rob Hubbard, known for titles such as Commando, Monty on the Run, International Karate, Sanxion, Skate or Die!, and Martin Galway, known for Wizball, Arkanoid and Times of Lore. Other noteworthies include David Whittaker (Lazy Jones, Speedball, Glider Rider, Amaurote), Jeroen Tel (Cybernoid, Turbo OutRun, Robocop 3 and Myth), Ben Daglish (The Last Ninja, Jack the Nipper, Firelord, Gauntlet), David Dunn (Finders Keepers and Flight Path 737), and Chris Hülsbeck (R-Type, Turrican and The Great Giana Sisters).

=== Recordings ===
The fact that many enthusiasts prefer the real chip sound over software emulators has led to several recording projects aiming to preserve the authentic sound of the SID chip for modern hardware.

The sid.oth4 project has over 380 high quality MP3 files available recorded on HardSID hardware, and the SOASC= project has the entire High Voltage SID Collection (HVSC) version 49 (over 35,000 tracks) recorded from real Commodore 64s in high quality MP3 files. Both projects emphasize the importance of preserving the authentic sound of the SID chip. In 2016, the Unepic Stoned High SID Collection (USHSC) was launched. It is a YouTube channel with over 50,000 SID tunes uploaded as single videos. The USHSC is based on both the SOASC= and HVSC, but also uploads recordings of recent SID music released at the Commodore Scene Database (CSDb) site. The channel features playlists containing roughly 5,000 tunes each.

== Reimplementations and derivatives ==
=== Emulation ===
- In 1989 on the Amiga computer, the demo "The 100 Most Remembered C64 Tunes" and later the PlaySID application was released, developed by Per Håkan Sundell and Ron Birk. This was one of the first attempts to emulate the SID in software only, and also introduced the file format for representing songs made on the C64 using the SID chip. This later spawned the creation of similar applications for other platforms as well as the creation of a community of people fascinated by SID music, resulting in The High Voltage SID Collection which contains over 57,000 SID tunes.

A SID file contains the 6510 program code and associated data needed to replay the music on the SID. The SID files have the MIME media type audio/prs.sid.

The actual file format of a SID file has had several versions. The older standard is PSID (current version V4). The newer standard, RSID, is intended for music that requires a more complete emulation of the Commodore 64 hardware.

The SID file format is not a native format used on the Commodore 64 or 128, but a format specifically created for emulator-assisted music players such as PlaySID , Sidplay and JSidplay2. However, there are loaders like RealSIDPlay and converters such as PSID64 that make it possible to play a substantial portion of SID files on original Commodore computers.

- SIDPlayer, developed by Christian Bauer and released in 1996 for the BeOS operating system, was the first SID emulator to replicate the filter section of the SID chip using a second-order Infinite impulse response filter as an approximation.
- In June 1998, a cycle-based SID emulator engine called reSID became available. The all-software emulator, available with C++ source code, is licensed under the GPL by the author, Dag Lem. In 2008, Antti Lankila significantly improved the filter and distortion simulation in reSID. The improvements were included in VICE version 2.1 as well.
- In 2007 the JSidplay2 project was released, a pure Java based SID player developed by Ken Händel.

=== Hardware using the SID chip ===
- In 1989 Innovation Computer developed the Innovation Sound Standard SSI-2001, an IBM PC compatible sound card with a SID chip and a game port. MicroProse promised software support for the card, and Commodore BASIC programs that used SID required little conversion to run on GW-BASIC.
- In 1997, an electronic musical instrument utilizing the SID chip as its synthesis engine was released. It is called the SidStation, built around the 6581 model SID chip (as opposed to the newer 8580), and it's produced by Swedish company Elektron. As the SID chip had been discontinued for years, Elektron allegedly bought up almost all of the remaining stock. In 2004, Elektron released the Monomachine pattern-based sequencer with optional keyboard. The Monomachine contains several synthesis engines, including an emulated 6581 oscillator using a DSP.
- In 1999, HardSID, another PC sound card, was released. The card uses from one to four SID chips and allowed a PC to utilize the sound capabilities of the chip directly, instead of by emulation via generic sound cards (e.g. SoundBlaster).
- The Catweasel from German company Individual Computers, a PCI + Zorro multiformat floppy disk controller and digital joystick adapter for PCs, Macs, and Amigas, includes a hardware SID option, i.e. an option to insert one or two real SID chips in a socket for use when playing .MUS files.
- The MIDIbox SID is a MIDI-controlled synthesizer which can contain up to eight SID chips. It is a free open source project using a PIC microcontroller. Control of the synthesizer is realized with software or via a control panel with knobs, LEDs, LCD, etc., which may optionally be mounted on a keyboardless Commodore 64 body.
- The Prophet64 is a cartridge for the Commodore 64. It features four separate music applications, mimicking everything from modern sequencers to the Roland TB-303/909 series. With an optional User Port peripheral, the Prophet64 may synchronized to other equipment using DIN Sync standard (SYNC 24). The website now states "Prophet64 has been replaced with the MSSIAH."
- The MSSIAH is a cartridge for the Commodore 64 that replaces the Prophet64.
- Artist/hacker Paul Slocum developed the Cynthcart cartridge that enables you to turn your C64 into an analogue synthesizer. Its successor, Cynthcart 2, added MIDI in, out and thru ports.
- The Parallel Port SID Interface allows those with very slim budgets to connect the SID chip to a PC.
- In 2003 a SID interface (and software to play Commodore 64 tunes) was released for the Z80 based Sam Coupé computer supporting both the 6581 and the 8580.
- In May 2009 the SID chip was interfaced to the BBC Micro and BBC Master range of computers via the 1 MHz bus allowing music written for the SID chip on the Commodore 64 to be ported and played on the BBC Micro.
- In October 2009 thrashbarg's project interfaced an SID chip to an ATmega8 to play MIDI files on a MOS 6581 SID.
- In March 2010 STG published the SIDBlaster/USB - an open source, open hardware implementation of the SID that connects to (and is powered by) a USB port, using an FTDI chip for the USB interface and a PIC to interface the SID.
- In August 2010 SuperSoniqs published the Playsoniq, a cartridge for MSX computers, with (in addition to other features) a real SID on it, ready to use on any MSX machine.
- In May 2015 Gianluca Ghettini developed SidBerry, an open source, open hardware board to interface a MOS 6581 SID chip to a RaspberryPi and play standard SID music files
- In 2016 Thibaut Varene published exSID, a USB audio device that can control a real 6581 and 8580 SID chip and natively playback most SID tunes.
- In early 2024 LouD started development of a new USB SID device that after several pcb iterations lead to the release of USBSID-Pico 1.0 or USBSID for short in October of that same year. USBSID-Pico is a RaspberryPi Pico powered board to control 2 real 6581 or 8580 and or hardware SID replacements over USB, WebUSB, Midi and ASID. The board is supported using several different types of software on Windows, MacOs, Linux, Android and AmigaOS. April 2025 marked the release of v1.3, an improved version of the board adding support for mixed SID setup and hardware mono/stereo audio switching. In July 2026 LouD released v1.5 that is completely jumperless and automatically sets the voltage for the seated SID chip type. It's slightly bigger then previous versions of the board to add support for dual ZIF sockets and to have enough space for larger hardware SID replacements like the FPGASID. Development of a Pro version of USBSID-Pico that is aimed at artists and audiophiles is ongoing. This new version has room for 4 SID chips and is to be expected nearing completion by the end of 2026/ early 2027.

=== Hardware reimplementations ===
- In 2008 the HyperSID project was released. HyperSID is a VSTi which acts like a MIDI controller for HyperSID hardware unit (synthesizer based on SID chip) and developed by HyperSynth company.
- The SwinSID is hardware emulation of the SID using an Atmel AVR processor, also featuring a real SID player based on the Atmel AVR processor.
- The V-SID 1.0 project (code name SID 6581D, 'D' for digital) from David Amoros was born in 2005. This project is a hardware emulation of the SID chip from the Bob Yannes's interview, datasheets. The V-SID 1.0 engine had been implemented in a FPGA EP1C12 Cyclone from ALTERA, on an ALTIUM development board, and emulates all the characteristics of the original SID, except the filter which is a digital version (IIR filter controlled by a CPU).
- The PhoenixSID 65X81 project (2006) aimed to faithfully create the SID sound using modern hardware. The workings of a SID chip were recreated on an FPGA, based on interviews with the SID's creator, original datasheets, and comparisons with real SID chips. It was distinguished from similar attempts by its use of real analog circuitry instead of emulation for the legendary SID filter. However, the project was discontinued, because George Pantazopoulos, who was the head of this project, died on April 23, 2007, at the age of 29.
- The C64 Direct-to-TV emulates large portions the SID hardware, minus certain features such as (most notably) the filters. It reduces the entire C64 to a small circuit that fits into a joystick while sacrificing some compatibility.
- The SIDcog is a software SID emulator running on the Parallax Propeller. All three channels can be emulated on one of the Propeller's eight COGs.
- The ARMSID is a "plug & play" replacement of the MOS 6581 and MOS 8580 with analog inputs support.
- The FPGASID is a FPGA based SID replica providing high reproduction quality of the original device including all features such as the audio filters and the paddle registers. The device is a full featured stereo solution and can replace two SID chips in a single SID socket. Hardware base is an Altera MAX10 FPGA.
- SIDKick pico is a dual-SID-replacement for the C64 and C128 from GitHub user frntc. There are several board variants, based on the Raspberry Pi Pico range of microcontrollers.

== See also ==
- Sound chip
- MOS Technology VIC
- POKEY
- Original Amiga chipset#Paula
- Chiptune
