= Hanaho =

2005 Video game

- Type: Privately held company
- Industry: Arcade game
- Founded: 7 May 1946
- Headquarters: Cerritos, California, USA
- Area served: Worldwide
- Key people: Conway Ho (CEO) & Mark Chien (Co-founder)
- Products: Ghost Hunter; Skill Shot; Match Three; HotRod Joystick; Mallet Madness; Rapid Fire; PDA Software; Arcade PC; Dragon World 3
- Revenue: ▲US$ 0–1 Million(2005)
- Number of employees: 25
- Website: Hanaho

HanaHo Games Inc is a division of Semco/PVG that services the commercial coin-op industry. HanaHo primarily produced the HotRod arcade joystick. They also sold a line of non-coin-operated PC game machines (the machines had a coin door, but it was non-functional) that included 50 game titles from Capcom. The company was started by Tony Hana and Conway Ho (hence the name Hanaho). Their first product was the game Ghost Hunter. It was headquartered in Cerritos, California.

In January 2010, the official website was "down for maintenance". In 2013 the website was removed altogether.

== History ==
Through the 1960s and mid-1970s, Semco produced store displays for Disney, Circuit City, Sears, Kraco Radio, JD Industries, and Complete Warehouse Video showroom displays.

In the 1980s, the video game era came to a peak and Semco acquired PVG (Pacific Video Games) and started producing arcade cabinets for companies including Gremlin/Sega's Frogger, Star Trek, and Zaxxon, Wedges/Ledges, Leland's Dragon's Lair and Super Off Road arcade video game cabinets, Indian Gaming Reservation slot machines, video poker machines, Capcom's Street Fighter arcade video game cabinets, and Sega GameWorks Custom Classic Cabinets and Custom Arcade Cabinets.

In December 2007, Capcom Games filed a federal lawsuit for copyright and trademark infringement against HanaHo Games and its president, Conway Ho in regards to the use of their properties in the Arcade Legends 2 and Ultimate Arcade 2 arcade cabinets. The case was voluntarily dismissed with prejudice in February 2008. In 2010, HanaHo developed updated ports of Splatterhouse, Splatterhouse 2, and Splatterhouse 3 for the Splatterhouse reboot.

== Products ==
HanaHo's first product was the game Ghost Hunter, released in 1995. It was a light gun ticket redemption game where the goal of the game was zapping ghosts, collecting fruit, and spelling out the letters "JACKPOT" to get the ticket bonus. They also developed the ticket redemption game Match Three for Jaleco. Their next game was the game Skill Shot, released in 1998. It was a coin flicking ticket redemption game with a pool theme. HanaHo's third game was the game Dragon World 3. It was a mahjong game, licensed from IGS and also released in 1998. Also in 1998, HanaHo released the light gun video game Rapid Fire. The game was a minigame collection, and it was developed by Bone Daddy Entertainment. In 1999, HanaHo developed the ticket redemption game Mallet Madness, which was released by Capcom. In the game, players used the mallet "Max Flattener" in one of four minigames to win tickets. This partnership with Capcom also allowed them to release the HotRod joysticks with a set of 50 Capcom games, and the Arcade PC system with a set of 14 Capcom games (both running MAME).
