= VICE =

Emulator for Commodore's 8-bit computers

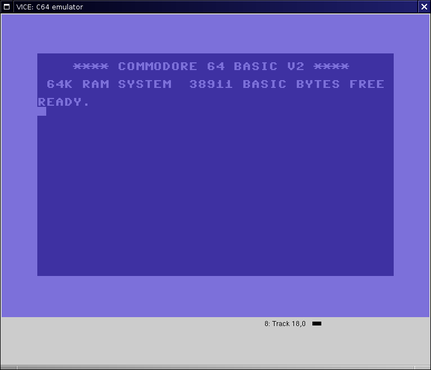
- VICE emulating Commodore 64
- Developer: VICE Team
- Release: 1993; 33 years ago
- Stable release: 3.10 / December 24, 2025; 9 months ago
- Written in: C and GTK+
- Operating system: Microsoft Windows, macOS, Linux, MS-DOS, RISC OS, BeOS, QNX, OS/2, Solaris, SunOS, OpenServer, AmigaOS, Dingoo, Syllable Desktop, MiNT, MINIX 3
- Size: 56.3 MB (GTK3VICE-3.6.1-win64)
- Available in: English, Danish, German, French, Hungarian, Italian, Dutch, Polish, Swedish, Turkish
- Type: Emulator
- License: GNU GPLv2
- Website: vice-emu.sourceforge.io
- Repository: sourceforge.net/projects/vice-emu/
- As of: 16 August 2022

The software program VICE, standing for VersatIle Commodore Emulator, is a free and cross platform emulator for Commodore's 8-bit computers. It runs on Linux, Amiga, Unix, MS-DOS, Win32, macOS, OS/2, RISC OS, QNX, GP2X, Pandora, Dingoo A320, Syllable, and BeOS host machines. VICE is free software, released under the GNU General Public License since 2004.

VICE for Microsoft Windows (Win32) prior to v3.3 were known as WinVICE, the OS/2 variant is called Vice/2, and the emulator running on BeOS is called BeVICE.

== History ==
The development of VICE began in 1993 by Finnish programmer Jarkko Sonninen, who was the founder of the project. Sonninen retired from the project in 1994.

VICE 2.1, released on December 19, 2008, emulates the Commodore 64, Commodore 128, Commodore VIC-20, Commodore Plus/4, C64 Direct-to-TV (with its additional video modes) and all the Commodore PET models including the CBM-II but excluding the 'non-standard' features of the SuperPET 9000. WinVICE supports digital joysticks via a parallel port driver, and, with a CatWeasel PCI card, is planned to perform hardware SID playback (requires optional SID chip installed in socket).

As of 2004, VICE was one of the most widely used emulators of the Commodore 8-bit personal computers. It is also one of the few usable Commodore emulators to exist on free Unix-based platforms, including most Linux and BSD distributions.

VICE 3.4 drops support for Syllable Desktop, SCO, QNX, SGI, AIX, OPENSTEP/NeXTSTEP/Rhapsody, and Solaris/OpenIndiana, as well as remaining traces of support for Minix, SkyOS, UNIXWARE, and Sortix, due to lack of staff.

VICE 3.5 drops explicit support for OS/2 and AmigaOS, due to the transition to GTK3 UI.

In December 2022, the VICE emulator was used as an inspiration for an Apple Macintosh emulator powered by a Raspberry Pi.

== See also ==
- Commodore 64
- GEOS (8-bit operating system)
- CCS64
- MAME
- List of computer system emulators
