= Per Håkan Sundell =

Per Håkan Sundell (born 1968, Sweden) is a programmer and computer scientist with roots in the scene and early computer enthusiasts of the eighties, when he was known as PHS of CCS (Computerbrains Cracking Service).

== Biography ==
Håkan currently holds a Ph.D. in computing science (2004) from Chalmers University of Technology and works as associate professor in software engineering at the School of Business and Informatics, University College of Borås, Sweden.

== Works ==
=== Video games ===
- Centurio (1984), developed with Ale Rivinoja
- Time Zero (1986), developed with Ale Rivinoja

=== Other software ===
- CCS-Mon (1986) debugger cartridge
- PlaySID (1990) SID chip emulator, developed with Ron Birk
- CCS64 (1995) C64 emulator
- NOBLE (2002) software library, developed with Philippas Tsigas
