= Maximum downside exposure =

In financial investment, the maximum downside exposure (MDE) values the maximum downside to an investment portfolio. In other words, it states the most that the portfolio could lose in the event of a catastrophe. As such, MDE obviates the need to worry about the market's unpredictable swings as it virtually "eliminates" downside surprises. The formula:

MDE = unhedged exposure/total portfolio value.

(For example, if half of the funds are in inflation-protected cash, and the other half in stocks, the portfolio could not lose more than 50% – the portfolio's MDE.)

The main benefit of MDE is that – unlike probabilistic risk models (such as VaR) – it appropriately factors in all risks to the portfolio without looking at historical (and often erroneous) data and relying on simplistic statistical assumptions that don't correspond to the real world. This makes MDE a very robust risk management tool.
