= 86Box =

PC emulator

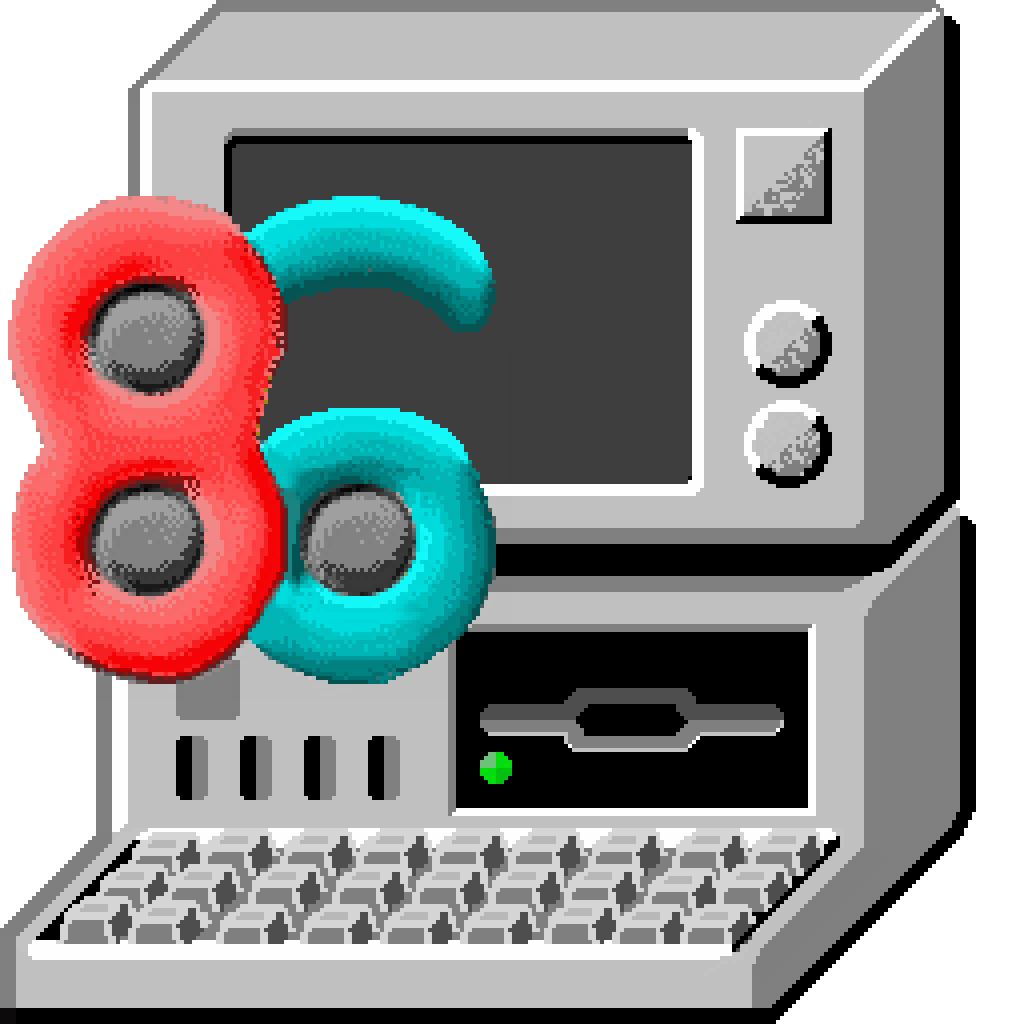

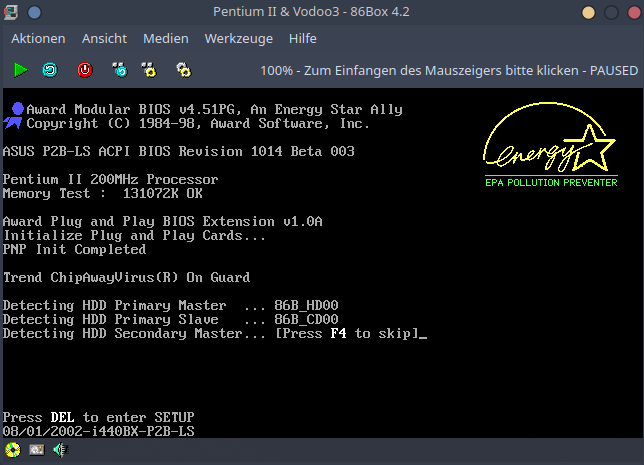
- Screenshot of 86Box
- Developer: Miran Grča (including contributors)
- Release: 15 August 2016; 9 years ago
- Stable release: 6.0 / 31 May 2026; 45 days ago
- Written in: C, C++
- Operating system: Microsoft Windows, Linux, macOS
- Type: Virtual machine, emulator
- License: GNU GPL version 2
- Website: 86box.net
- Repository: github.com/86Box/86Box/

86Box is an IBM PC emulator for Windows, Linux and macOS based on PCem that specializes in running old operating systems and software that are designed for IBM PC compatibles. Originally forked from PCem, it later added support for other IBM PC compatible computers as well.

== Features ==
=== Hardware ===
The main goal of 86Box is to emulate various IBM PC compatible systems/motherboards from 1981 until 1999, which includes almost all IBM PC models (including the IBM PS/1 model 2121 and the IBM PS/2 model 2011) and supports IBM PC compatible systems/motherboards.

86Box is capable of emulating Intel processors (and its respective clones, including Advanced Micro Devices, IDT and Cyrix) from Intel 8088 through the Pentium Tillamook MMX/Mobile MMX processors and Pentium Pro/Pentium II processors from 1997 until 1999. A recompiler is mandatory for P5 Pentium and Cyrix processors and optional for i486 processors and IDT WinChip processors.

86Box can emulate different graphic modes, this includes text mode, Hercules, CGA (including some composite modes and the 160 × 100 × 16 tweaked modes), Tandy, EGA, VGA (including Mode X and other tweaks), VESA, as well as various video APIs such as DirectX and 3Dfx's Glide. 86Box can also emulate various video cards such as the ATI Mach64 GX and the S3 Trio32/64/Virge series. Voodoo cards are also emulated with support for Voodoo 1/2/3 and various optimizations. A separate recompiler has been added for Voodoo emulation, making it faster to emulate the Voodoo graphics card.

86Box can emulate some sound cards, such as the AdLib, Sound Blaster (including the Game Blaster), Sound Blaster Pro, Sound Blaster 16, Sound Blaster AWE32, Gravis UltraSound, Innovation SSI-2001, Aztech Sound Galaxy Pro 16, Windows Sound System, Ensoniq AudioPCI 64V/ES1371, and Sound Blaster PCI 128.

86Box also emulates some SCSI cards, such as SCSI cards from BusLogic and Symbios Logic.

=== Operating system support ===
Similar to Virtual PC, Bochs and QEMU, 86Box supports almost all versions of Microsoft Windows until Windows 7 (including Service Pack 1); MS-DOS, FreeDOS and CP/M-86 are also supported. Earlier versions of OS/2 requires the hard drive to be formatted prior to installation, while OS/2 Warp 3 until Warp 4.5 requires an unaccelerated video card to run. Other operating systems are also supported on 86Box, such as versions of Linux that support the Pentium processor, BSD derivatives (e.g. FreeBSD), and BeOS 5, which only works on the Award SiS 497 motherboard.

=== Host operating system support ===
Initially exclusive to Windows, it was ported to Linux in version 3.2 and macOS in version 3.4.

=== Manager ===
For easier handling of multiple virtual machines at the same time and the change of its parameters, it is recommended to use 86Box with a GUI manager application. Some of them are 86Box Manager, 86Box Manager Lite and WinBox for 86Box, all available as free software, too. Since version 5.0 86Box includes a built-in VM Manager and is enabled by default.

== History ==
=== PCem ===
PCem
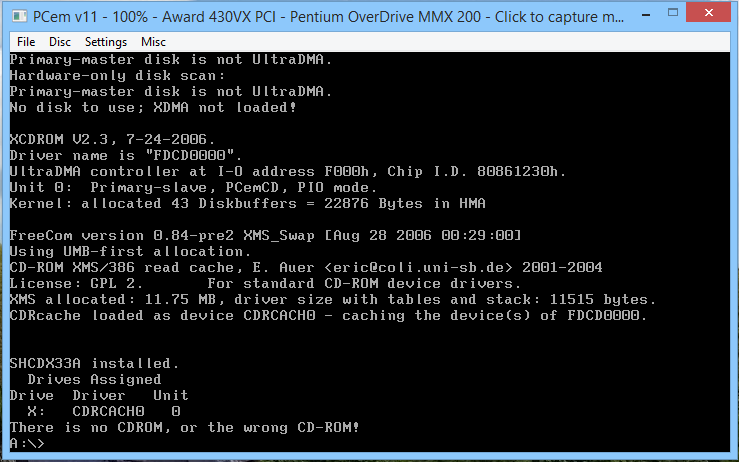
- Screenshot of PCem running FreeDOS 1.0
- Original authors: Sarah Walker (Until June 2021)
- Developer: Michael Manley (including contributors)
- Release: 15 August 2007; 18 years ago
- Stable release: 17 / 1 December 2020; 5 years ago
- Written in: C, C++
- Operating system: Microsoft Windows, Linux
- Type: Virtual machine, emulator
- License: GNU GPL version 2
- Website: pcem-emulator.co.uk/index.html
- Repository: github.com/sarah-walker-pcem/pcem/

86Box began as a fork of PCem, another open-source IBM PC emulator. PCem was originally developed by Sarah Walker from 2007 until her retirement from the project in 2021, at which point she named Michael Manley as the new project maintainer. Like 86Box, PCem allows users to emulate PC compatibles across a range of x86 processors—from the Intel 8088 to the Pentium II—as well as the ability to emulate sound cards (such as the Sound Blaster 16) and GPUs (including an extremely small number of early 3D accelerators: the S3 ViRGE/325, the S3 ViRGE/DX, the 3DFX Voodoo, and the 3DFX Voodoo2, but no ATI, Nvidia, Matrox, PowerVR, or Rendition chipsets). This versatility allows older PC software with complex hardware requirements to run accurately, in terms of clock speed and multimedia performance, on modern hardware. A benefit of 86Box over mainstream hosted hypervisors such as VirtualBox is the ability to run custom BIOS ROMs. This allows users to closely emulate specific PC compatibles, such as those by Compaq and Asus, among others.

=== Reception ===
PCem has been used by archivists in academic settings to emulate older software for the purposes of displaying historical digital art. Additionally, both PCem and 86Box have been used by Microsoft to test their archival source code for successful compilation.

== See also ==
- DOSBox
- DOSEMU
- QEMU
- Bochs
- Parallels
- Virtual PC
- VirtualBox
- VMware Fusion
- VMware Workstation
