= CCS64 =

- Developer: Per Håkan Sundell
- Release: 1995; 31 years ago
- Stable release: 4.1 / 27 July 2026; 3 months ago
- Operating system: Windows
- Type: Emulator
- License: Shareware
- Website: ccs64.com

CCS64 is a shareware Commodore 64 emulator developed by Per Håkan Sundell of Sweden. It can play Commodore 64 formatted cartridges, demos, games, and music in Windows, and it has many modern software features. The emulator has had continuous enhancement and bug-fixing since its original development back in 1995. Later versions of the emulator are fully functional, even when it is not registered.
