= Microsoft Device Emulator =

Emulator for Windows Mobile-based devices

Microsoft Device Emulator is an emulator for Windows Mobile-based devices. Microsoft Officially launched an emulator for Windows Mobile 6.5 in November 2008 (although an emulator was included in the SDK for Windows Mobile 2003), The Windows Mobile 6.5 Developer Tool Kit adds various features for developing such as documentation, obtaining a sample code, header and library files, emulator images and tools to Visual Studio. The Microsoft Device Emulator is available in Simplified Chinese, English, German, French, Italian, Spanish, and Japanese. Independent from the Windows Mobile emulator Microsoft has also released an emulator for Internet Explorer Mobile for developers.

MS DeviceEmulator v1.0 emulates SMDK2410 board using JIT technology (see MS DeviceEmulator v1.0 Shared Source). There is sample BSP for it available for download.

Among the features of the Windows Mobile 6.5 device emulator are testing out browsing, application deployment, emulator images, new touch and gesture APIs, and code samples for developing software, and the features of the operating system and the SDK contains a step-by-step guide on how to create widgets for Windows Mobile 6.5. The default search engine of the emulator is Bing Mobile and there is a desktop application that leads to the Windows Marketplace for Mobile.

The SDK for Windows Mobile 6.5 was quickly discontinued as Microsoft wanted developers to start developing for the incompatible successor to the platform, Windows Phone 7.

== See also ==
- Windows Virtual PC
