= Robert Raguso =

American biologist (born 1965)

Robert A. Raguso
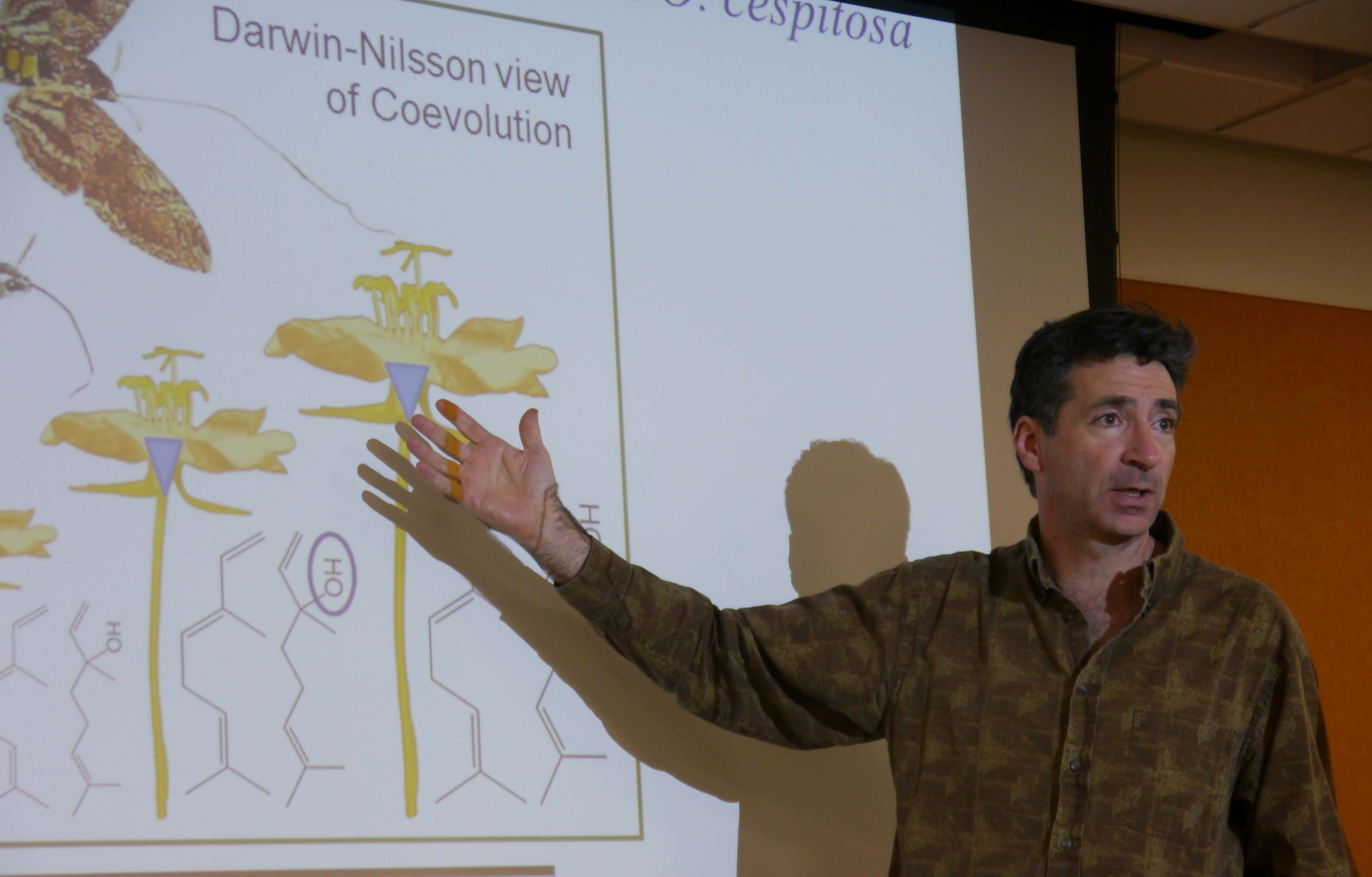
- Dr. Robert Raguso delivering a lecture on Darwin's notion of plant pollination and coevolution with insects (2014).
- Born: January 30, 1965 (age 61); Englewood, New Jersey, U.S.
- Education: Yale University (B.Sc); University of Michigan (Ph.D)
- Known for: Pioneering and expanding the field of floral scent in modes of plant-pollinator communication
- Awards: Fulbright Scholar Award; ISCE Silverstein-Simeone Award
- Scientific career
- Fields: Plant and insect chemical ecology; Evolutionary biology; Plant biology; Neurobiology; Animal behavior
- Workplaces: Cornell University
- Doctoral advisor: Dr. Eran Pichersky

Robert A. Raguso (born January 30, 1965) is an American biologist and professor at Cornell University in the Department of Neurobiology and Behavior. He has expanded the field of chemical ecology by introducing and pioneering floral scent as a key component of plant-pollinator communication, with special focus on hawkmoths and Clarkia plants.

== Life ==
Robert Andrew Raguso was born on January 30, 1965, in Englewood, New Jersey. At age 5, Raguso was introduced to his first cecropia moth by Campbell Norsgaard, a film maker and naturalist, as a part of the "Broader Impacts" activities advocated by the National Science Foundation. This encounter sparked Raguso's interest in moths which has continued for 50 years. Raguso started his research career as a high schooler during the summers of 1982 and 1983, working as a technician in the laboratory of Columbia University professor Darcy Kelley, who taught summers at the Marine Biological Laboratory in Woods Hole, Massachusetts.

Raguso's interests expanded from moths to butterflies, and his love for the biological diversity of Lepidoptera led him to study butterflies with Professor Charles Remington at Yale University. During the summer of 1985, Raguso expanded his biological interests and pursued field research at a variety of destinations. At Mountain Lake Biological Station in the Southern Appalachians of Virginia, Raguso developed a lifelong fascination with pollination while studying nectar variance and risk aversion by bees with Professors Beverly Rathcke (later a key figure in his graduate years) and Leslie Real. Raguso also traveled to Laguna Encantada near Catemaco in Veracruz, Mexico, where he initiated a butterfly survey with Professors Carol C. Horvitz and Doug Schemske that would eventually become his first publication. Raguso also completed a senior honors thesis on the biodiversity of interior Colias butterfly populations, which had been separated anywhere from 8 to 12,000 generations due to the retreat of the Laurentide Ice Sheet.

Raguso graduated from Yale in 1987 with a Bachelor of Science, majoring in biology and minoring in art history. Following graduation, Raguso spent two years working as a technician in the Stanford University laboratory of Professor Ward Watt, a former student of Charles Remington. Under Watt's guidance, Raguso broadened his understanding of evolutionary genetics and functional ecology, caring for thousands of caterpillars of Colias butterflies, taking classes, and learning research techniques such as high-performance liquid chromatography and polyacrylamide gel electrophoresis.

In 1989, Raguso moved to the University of Michigan in Ann Arbor to start doctoral studies with Eran Pichersky. There, with encouragement from Rathcke and Michael Martin, he developed methodologies to test evolutionary hypotheses on the functional importance of floral scent. Raguso learned to collect and analyze floral volatiles, mastering gas chromatography and molecular spectroscopy (GC-MS) as he worked midnight-to-dawn shifts in the university's chemistry labs. Through bioassay-guided fractionation, Raguso isolated the individual molecules contributing to the floral scents of two lines of Clarkia breweri as well as its suspected progenitor, Clarkia concinna. Evolutionary shifts in scent produced by these flowers contributed to a parallel change in the pollinator identities of these flowers. In 1995, Raguso earned his PhD after completing his thesis "Mechanisms of floral scent production and hawkmoth pollination in Clarkia breweri (Onagraceae)". Through this work, Raguso laid a critical foundation for further research involving floral volatiles.

In 1996, Raguso embarked on postdoctoral studies at the University of Arizona, guiding his research interests back to hawkmoths under the mentoring of Professors John Hildebrand and Lucinda McDade. Funded through the Center for Insect Science, Raguso worked after sunset with Mark Willis in the Arizona-Sonora Desert Museum, piecing together the multimodal feeding behavior—a combination of visual and olfactory stimuli—of hawkmoths when visiting Datura flowers. Further postdoctoral studies involved mapping floral volatiles onto phylogenetic relationships, particularly in the context of hawkmoth pollination disappearing and reappearing repeatedly in three plant lineages.

Raguso started a faculty position at the University of South Carolina in 1999, served as a visiting professor at the University of KwaZulu-Natal between 2006 and 2007, and moved to Cornell (replacing the "father of chemical ecology", Tom Eisner) in 2007, where he currently serves as a professor. More on Raguso's professional preparation and scientific development can be found here.

== Research ==
Raguso has continued to develop the study of floral scents and their importance in the pollination of wild plants over the past decades. He is cited for behavioral studies of insects, flowers, plant chemical ecology, and integrating physiology and evolutionary theory to understand the mechanistic basis of pollination. To date, his research has resulted in over 150 peer-reviewed scientific publications and over 7,000 citations by his peers. He is the past chairperson of his department at Cornell.

Raguso's laboratory studies signal evolution from the standpoints of both the producer (plants) and receiver (insects). In each of several study systems, he and his students have dissected the importance of plant volatile organic compounds in pollination and coevolution between species. He has a long-standing interest in plants in the evening primrose family (Onagraceae), including Oenothera and Clarkia species. From the insect perspective, Raguso has focused on hawkmoths (especially Manduca species) and has investigated their use of floral scent, humidity, and carbon dioxide produced in flowers. Manduca perceive these cues and use them opportunistically. In addition to flowering plants, Raguso has published on mosses and fungi that use color and scent to trick flies into dispersing their spores to rotting substrates. His research has been supported by the National Science Foundation, National Geographic Society, and the Andrew W. Mellon Foundation.

Raguso has been an invited lecturer at universities, public gardens, and classes. In addition to his work at Cornell, Raguso teaches a field course on volatile analysis at Rocky Mountain Biological Laboratory and has been a visiting instructor for a variety of ecological and behavioral courses in Chile, Costa Rica, Sweden, Spain, and Germany. Raguso is the co-founder of the Gordon Research Conference on Floral Volatiles. Raguso is a Fulbright senior fellow, National Geographic Explorer, and recipient of the 2017 Silverstein-Simeone Award from the International Society of Chemical Ecology. Raguso has two children with his wife, Dr. Laurel Hester, assistant provost at Keuka College, with whom he currently resides in Ithaca, New York.
