= Jean Godfrey-June =

American journalist

Jean Godfrey-June is an American beauty editor and journalist. The former beauty editor of Lucky magazine, Godfrey-June currently works at Goop as a beauty editor.

== Career ==
From 1994 to 2000, Godfrey-June worked at Elle.

In 2000, Godfrey-June worked as a beauty editor for Lucky magazine. She would stay there until the magazine folded in 2015. Godfrey-June published a memoir, Free Gift with Purchase: My Improbable Career in Magazines and Makeup in 2006 with Harmony that detailed her tenures at both Elle and Lucky magazine. Part of her time there would also be documented in Cat Marnell's memoir How To Murder Your Life , as Marnell worked for her shortly after the publication of Free Gift With Purchase from 2006 to 2009.

After Lucky magazine folded in 2015, Godfrey-June wrote a series of articles on beauty for Vanity Fair. Later that same year, she left behind magazine writing to work as beauty editor at Goop.

== Personal life ==
Godfrey-June is the daughter of Alice Godfrey and American evolutionary biologist Ward Watt. She has two children, a daughter, India June, born in 1997, and a son, Wiley June, born in 2002. She was previously married to Gary June.

== Bibliography ==
- Free Gift with Purchase: My Improbable Career in Magazines and Makeup
