= Daniel T. Blumstein =

American ethologist and conservation biologist

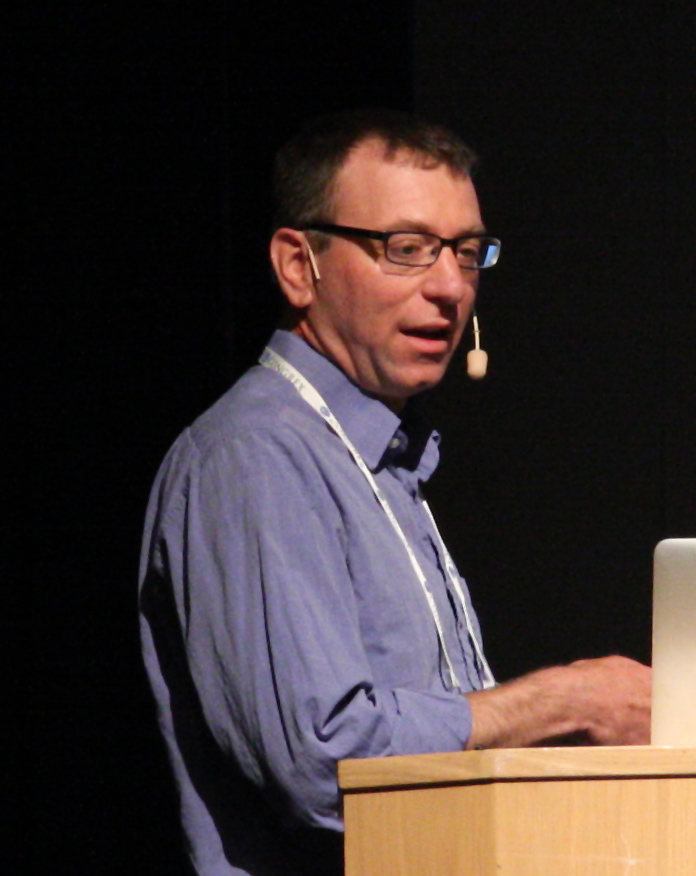
Daniel T. Blumstein giving a lecture at the 14th Behavioral Ecology Congress in Lund, Sweden (2012)

Daniel T. Blumstein is an ethologist and conservation biologist. He is professor at the Department of Ecology and Evolutionary Biology, as well as a professor for the Institute of the Environment and Sustainability, at the University of California, Los Angeles. He has authored or co-authored over 300 articles in peer-reviewed scientific journals. Furthermore, he authored the book The Failure of Environmental Education (and How We Can Fix It) with Charles Saylan, which was featured in the 2011 "Summer Reading: 7 Education Books to Take to the Beach" in Time magazine. Because of his work in conservation and education, he was invited to join the panel at the first ever United States White House conference on environmental education.

Blumstein earned a PhD in animal behavior in 1994 and a MS in animal behavior in 1990, both from the University of California, Davis. He earned a BA in environmental, population, and organismic biology as well as environmental conservation from the University of Colorado at Boulder in 1986. Born in Philadelphia, he graduated from Conestoga High School, in Berwyn, Pennsylvania, a western suburb of Philadelphia. He was elected a fellow of the Society of Biology in 2010 and the Animal Behavior Society in 2012. He served as the editor of the journal Animal Behaviour from 2006 to 2009 and has been the editor of Evolution, Medicine, and Public Health since 2011. He has served various editorial roles for the journals Evolution: This View of Life, The Quarterly Review of Biology, Behavioral Ecology, Biology Letters, and Ethology.

Inspired by the screams of a baby marmot, he conducted a study, published in Biology Letters, investigating nonlinearities in sound and their effect on response. The report found that the addition of non-linear elements produced stronger responses and valence, which implies that nonlinearities in sounds make them more frightening.

In 2026, Blumstein started an "OnlyMarms" account on OnlyFans to raise money for marmot research. He cited the TV series Margo's Got Money Troubles as inspiration. He also helped inaugurate Fat Marmot Week, an online contest similar to Fat Bear Week, to raise money for research at the Rocky Mountain Biological Laboratory.
