= Billy Barr (naturalist) =

American amateur scientist

- Born: Trenton, New Jersey, U.S.
- Education: Rutgers University
- Scientific career
- Fields: Climatology
- Institutions: Rocky Mountain Biological Laboratory
- Website: www.gothicwx.org

Billy Barr, stylized as billy barr, is an American amateur scientist known for his collection of over 50 years of data on snow levels, temperatures and animal migration in the Colorado Rocky Mountains. Barr's data collection is recognized as critical evidence of the effects of climate change.

== Life and work ==
Barr grew up in Trenton, New Jersey. In 1972, as a student researcher from Rutgers University, he took a short-term job at the Rocky Mountain Biological Laboratory measuring water quality near Crested Butte in the West Elk Mountains, Colorado. After some time, he featured in a local newspaper as an eccentric mountain hermit.

In the mid 1970s, with the initial intention of escaping the boredom of living in the remote location of Gothic, Barr began meticulously collecting environmental data by measuring the snow depth, temperatures and noting the arrival of different species in the spring. Around the same time, he became "an unofficial caretaker" of the Rocky Mountain Biological Laboratory. In late 1990s, the lab's resident ecologist David Inouye recognized the significance of Barr's data and began sharing it with other scientists. Since then, Barr's records have been used in numerous scientific articles on climate change.

The 2016 documentary film The Snow Guardian is dedicated to Barr.
