= Carol L. Boggs =

American biologist

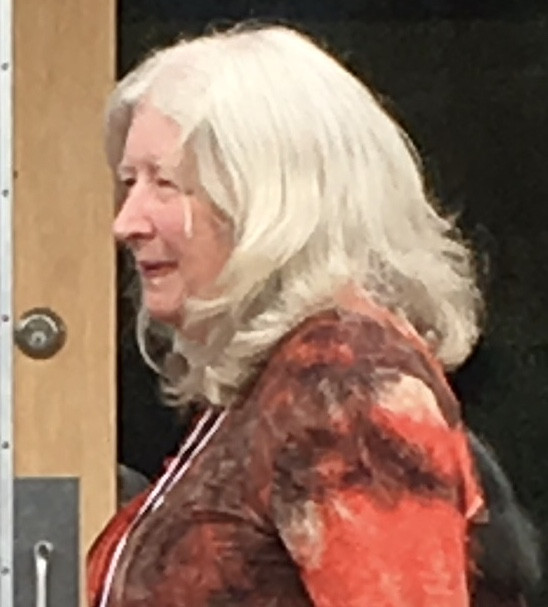
- Born: Carol Linda Boggs; April 11, 1952 (age 74)
- Education: University of Texas at Austin
- Known for: Reproductive biology Population biology Ecology; Evolution
- Scientific career
- Workplaces: University of South Carolina; Rocky Mountain Biological Laboratory

Carol Linda Boggs (born April 11, 1952) is an American biologist specializing in the reproductive biology, population biology, ecology, and evolution of butterflies. Boggs completed her BA in 1973 and her PhD in 1979 in zoology at the University of Texas at Austin. Since 2013, she has been a professor in the School of the Earth, Ocean and Environment and the Department of Biological Sciences at the University of South Carolina. Boggs is the author of more than 120 peer-reviewed articles and has served on editorial boards for several journals. She has been a fellow of the American Association for the Advancement of Science since 2001.

== Career ==
Boggs was a postdoctoral scholar at Stanford University from 1980 to 1985. Shortly after, Stanford hired her as a lecturer and consulting assistant professor in the Department of Biological Sciences (1986-1997). She was promoted to associate professor (teaching) (1997–2002), consulting professor (2002–2006), and finally, professor (teaching) (2006–2012). In parallel with these appointments, she was also a senior research scientist with Stanford University (1994–2006). Boggs also held administrative appointments at Stanford University such as the associate director (1994–1995) and director (1995–2006) of the Center for Conservation Biology, and the Bing Director for the Program in Human Biology (2006–2012). In 2013, Boggs moved to the University of South Carolina where she was hired as the director of the School of the Earth, Ocean and Environment (2013–2018) and as a professor in the School of the Earth, Ocean and Environment and the Department of Biological Sciences (2013–present).

Boggs has served on several editorial boards, either as a founding member or as an associate editor, for journals including Functional Ecology, Ecological Applications, Evolution, and the Journal of Insect Conservation. She has also worked with the Rocky Mountain Biological Laboratory (RMBL), serving on the board of trustees as a member for more than 13 years and as the president for 6 years. She has been a senior researcher with the RMBL since 1978.

== Research and contributions ==
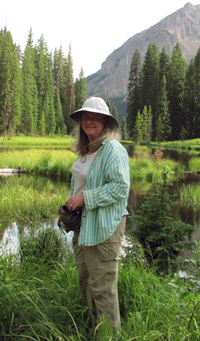
Boggs doing field work on butterflies.

Boggs' early research as a PhD student was influenced by her supervisor Lawrence E. Gilbert who studied neotropical butterflies in Costa Rica and Trinidad. Gilbert was trained by another butterfly biologist, Paul R. Ehrlich, who specializes in population ecology and whom Boggs would eventually collaborate with at Stanford University in later years. Boggs' early work focused mainly on the reproductive biology, sexual selection, and resource allocation of butterflies. For instance, she was the first to show that male butterflies can donate nutrients to future offspring. Her articles on the subject of male nuptial gifts opened up a new research arena and remains some of her most highly cited work to date.

Later, Boggs' research continued with her work on both lab-reared colonies (e.g., Colias eurytheme) and natural populations (e.g., Euphydryas editha) of butterflies. She has also done long-term studies on temperate montane species at the Rocky Mountain Biological Laboratory, including the locally introduced Gillette's checkerspot (Euphydryas gillettii) and the Mormon fritillary (Speyeria mormonia). Her research on S. mormonia in particular led to significant advancements in the understanding of the mechanisms underlying insect life history traits through the integration of knowledge on nutrient resource allocation.

Boggs' research on S. mormonia in the Colorado Rocky Mountains garnered media interest in 2013 when she used over two decades of long-term data to show how climate change can affect pollinator populations, raising awareness of this important issue. She showed that a single climate driver, early snow melt, affected S. mormonia population dynamics in indirect and direct ways. First, earlier snow melts led to situations where developing nectar flowers were decimated by early season frost events. For S. mormonia, this meant increased competition for nectar and therefore fewer eggs laid at the end of the season. In the following year after the eggs overwintered, early snow melts and early season frost events impacted the population once again, but this time directly through mortality of post-diapause caterpillars. Combined, the effects of early snow melt in two consecutive years explained as much as 84% of the variation in the population growth rate. In a New York Times interview, her co-author on the paper, David W. Inouye, stated that, "It is very unusual for research to uncover such a simple mechanism that can explain almost all of the variation in growth rate of an insect population". At the time the article was published, very few studies existed that illustrated the mechanisms whereby climate change can affect species' life history traits and fitness.

Overall, Boggs' work has mainly focused on determining how environmental variation affects individuals, populations, and species interactions.

== Honors and awards ==
Boggs became a fellow of the California Academy of Sciences in 2000 and the American Association for the Advancement of Science in 2001. She also served as the Stanford Friends University fellow in Undergraduate Education (2010–2012). In 2012, Boggs was awarded the Lloyd W. Dinkelspiel Award for Distinctive Contributions to Undergraduate Teaching at Stanford University.

== Personal life ==
For decades, Boggs and her husband, the accomplished evolutionary biologist Ward Watt, took research students nearly every summer to the Rocky Mountain Biological Laboratory in Gothic, CO until his death in 2024.

== Selected publications ==
=== Books ===
- Boggs, C. L.; Watt, W. B. & Ehrlich, P. R., eds. (2003). Butterflies: Ecology and Evolution Taking Flight. University of Chicago Press. 736 pp.

=== Selected papers ===
- Boggs, C. L. & Gilbert, L. E. (1979). "Male contribution to egg production in butterflies: Evidence for transfer of nutrients at mating". Science. 206: 83–84.
- McLaughlin, J. F.; Hellmann, J.; Boggs, C. L. & Ehrlich, P. R. (2002). "Climate change hastens population extinctions". Proceedings of the National Academy of Sciences of the United States of America. 99: 6070–6074.
- Fleishman, E.; Ray, C.; Sjögren-Gulve, P.; Boggs, C. L. & Murphy, D. D. (2002). "Assessing the relative roles of patch quality, area, and isolation in predicting metapopulation dynamics". Conservation Biology. 16: 706–716.
- Morris, W. F.; Pfister, C. A.; Tuljapurkar, S.; Haridas, C. V.; Boggs, C. L.; Boyce, M. S.; Bruna, E. M.; Church, D. R.; Coulson, T.; Doak, D. F.; Forsyth, S.; Gaillard, J-M.; Horvitz, C. C.; Kalisz, S.; Kendall, B. E.; Knight, T. M.; Lee, C. T. & Menges, E. S. (2008). "Longevity can buffer plant and animal populations against changing climatic uncertainty". Ecology. 89: 19–25.
- Chan, K. M. A.; Pringle, R. M.; Ranganathan, J.; Boggs, C. L.; Chan, Y. E.; Ehrlich, P. R.; Haff, P.; Heller, N. E.; Al-Khafaji, K. & MacMynowski, D. (2007). "When Agendas Collide: Human Welfare and Biological Conservation". Conservation Biology. 21: 59–68.
- Boggs, C. L. (1990). "A general model of the role of male-donated nutrients in female insects' reproduction". American Naturalist. 136: 598–617.
- Boggs, C. L. & Ross, C. L. (1993). "The effect of adult food limitation on life history traits in Speyeria mormonia (Lepidoptera: Nymphalidae)". Ecology. 74: 433–441.
- Boggs, C. L. (1981). "Nutritional and life history determinants of resource allocation in holometabolous insects". American Naturalist. 117: 692–709.
- Dunlap-Pianka, H.; Boggs, C. L. & Gilbert, L. E. (1977). "Ovarian dynamics in heliconiine butterflies: Programmed senescence versus eternal youth". Science. 197: 487–490.
