= Fat Bear Week =

Annual tournament

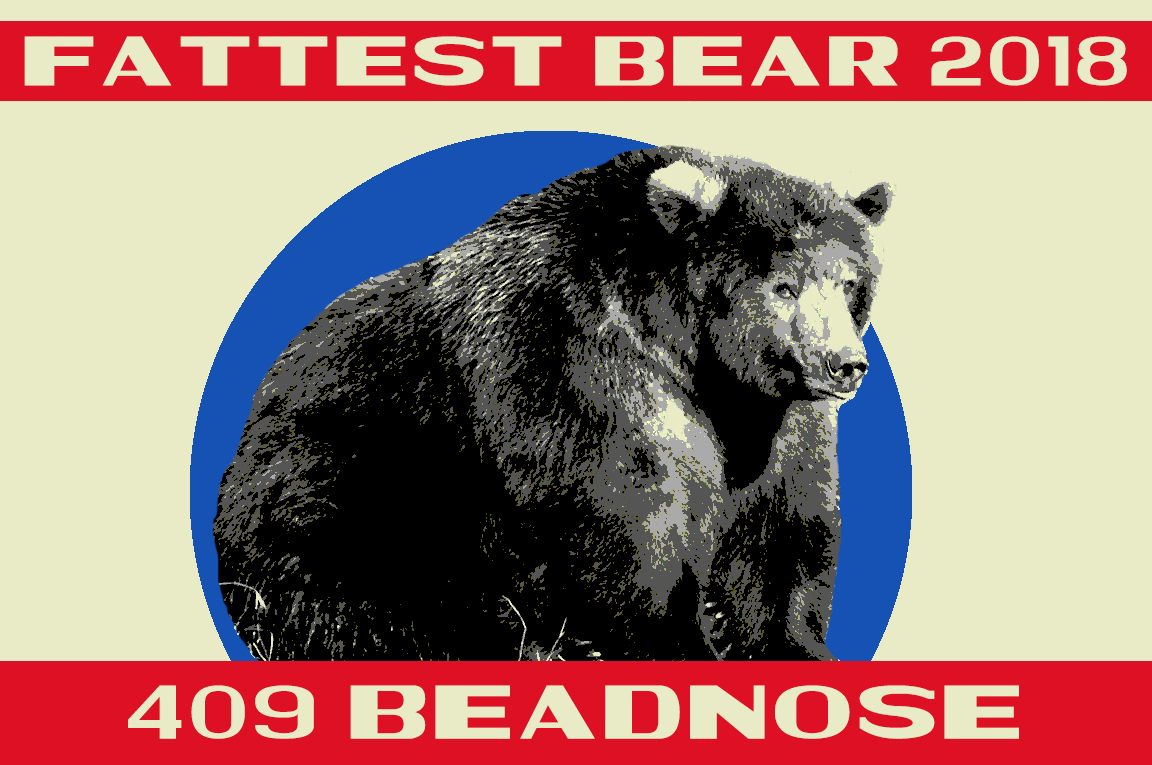
- Announcement of the 2018 Fat Bear Week winner, Beadnose
- Frequency: Annual
- Locations: Katmai National Park and Preserve, Alaska, United States
- Years active: 2014–present
- Inaugurated: 2014
- Most recent: September 22–29, 2026
- Participants: 1.7 million (2025)
- Website: https://explore.org/fat-bear-week

Fat Bear Week is an annual event held in late September or early October by Katmai National Park and Preserve in Alaska, commemorating the seasonal preparations for winter hibernation made by Alaska peninsula brown bears inhabiting Katmai. The competition is organized by the National Park Service and Explore.org. Spectators from around the world are invited to cast online votes to determine the bear that has most effectively accumulated fat reserves. In 2023, Associated Press called the competition "Alaska's most-watched popularity contest".

The event highlights the hyperphagia of bears preparing for hibernation. During the summer and autumn months, bears often exceed 1,000 pounds (450 kg), when they feed on salmon in anticipation of their extended hibernation period. Bears can lose up to a third of their body weight during hibernation, as they do not eat or drink until they emerge in the spring. The goal of Fat Bear Week is to promote bear conservation, cultivate an interest in wildlife, and encourage positive human-nature interactions.

== Background ==
Katmai National Park and Reserve is dedicated to conservation and recreation, spanning 16,552 square kilometers (6,391 square miles) in the southwestern region of Alaska. This area features many lakes, several volcanoes, and rivers with a large population of red salmon. It is home to a large range of species of wildlife, including the Alaskan brown bear. It serves as the backdrop for the annual Fat Bear Week competition. The national park is home to approximately 2,200 Alaska peninsula brown bears. Live webcams are placed at Brooks Falls and along the Brooks River, allowing the public to view the bears.

Throughout the summer and fall, the brown bears of Katmai National Park consume large quantities of food, primarily sockeye salmon found in the park's rivers. This behavior, known as hyperphagia, allows them to accumulate the fat reserves needed to survive months of hibernation, which typically begins in November. In particular, adult male bears can gain up to 500 pounds (230 kg) or more. By the time hibernation starts in October and November, males may weigh up to 1,200 pounds (540 kg).

These bears are known to consume as much as 120 pounds (54 kg) of salmon in a single day, sometimes catching as many as 30 fish daily. Fish can help them gain up to 4 pounds a day, throughout the entirety of the season.

In addition to simple survival, fat reserves are also needed for pregnant bears; success of pregnancies is related to the adequate accumulation of fat reserves during the autumn months, which give the mothers sufficient energy stores to nurture their cubs through the winter.

== Conservation efforts ==
The competition is intended to raise awareness, help generate interest in conservation, and allow people to engage with wildlife via the webcams. Rangers associated with Fat Bear Week have also cited a desire to increase accessibility to the otherwise remote Katmai National Park. Evidence of this positive interaction with wildlife can be seen in the fan groups and pages started on social media groups. One such group even began a charity bracket event organized by Fat Bear fans. The money raised from the buy in was donated to a charity chosen by the bracket winner. One such charity was the Katmai Conservancy.

== History ==
Fat Bear Week was founded as Fat Bear Tuesday by former park ranger Mike Fitz in 2014. He came up with the idea after noting the interest in online livestreams of the bears feeding at the river. Visitors to the national park were asked to review before and after photos of a number of the park's bears and to vote for the fattest bear in a single-elimination tournament. In 2015, the tournament was first hosted online, and was extended to a week.

In 2021, the Fat Bear Junior bracket was introduced. This separate competition features young bear cubs, which can go on to contend with adult bears in the main bracket.

=== 2022 voter fraud ===
During the semi-finals of the 2022 event, Bear 435, known as Holly, initially appeared to defeat Bear 747. An investigation by park officials found that Holly had received 9,000 votes in a short span of time. After fake votes were discarded, Bear 747 was determined the winner with 37,940 votes, while Bear 435 received 30,430 votes.

=== 2023 hiker rescue ===
One of the webcams used during Fat Bear Week aided in the rescue of a hiker on September 5, 2023; at 3:15 p.m. a visibly cold and soaked hiker appeared in the webcam frame on Dumpling Mountain seeking help. After viewers notified authorities, park rangers found the hiker near the camera at approximately 6:48 p.m.

=== 2024 bear attack ===
During the opening week of the 2024 event, Bear 469, a male known as Patches, attacked a female, Bear 402, resulting in her death. This was witnessed live on the cameras in Katmai National Park. Park officials delayed the opening day of Fat Bear Week to host a live Q&A. Katmai Park ranger Sarah Bruce noted the event was unusual; "It's an uncommon thing to see a bear predating on another bear, but it's not completely out of the question. So it's hard to say how this started." Bear 469 had previously been seen guarding the remains of another bear in 2012.

=== 2026 ===
For the 2026 event, Google added a small interactive bear to the search results for "Fat Bear" and "Fat Bear Week" that allowed users to feed the bear salmon, causing it to grow in size.

== Tournament ==
In late summer, Fitz and park rangers select a list of contenders and organize them into a March Madness-style bracket. Fitz writes detailed biographies for each bear, identified by number and sometimes by nickname, and shares before-and-after photographs illustrating their weight gain over the season.

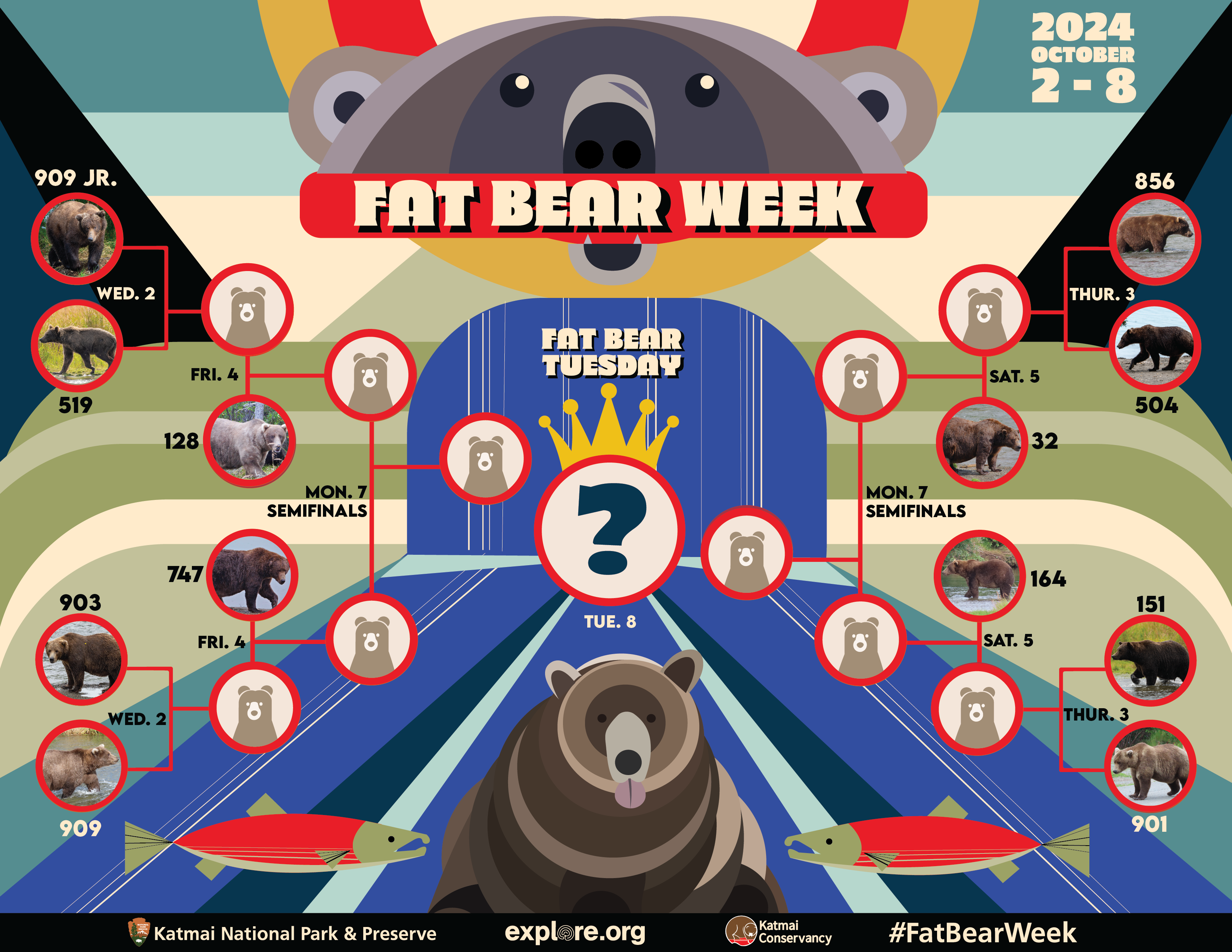
The official 2024 bracket after round one

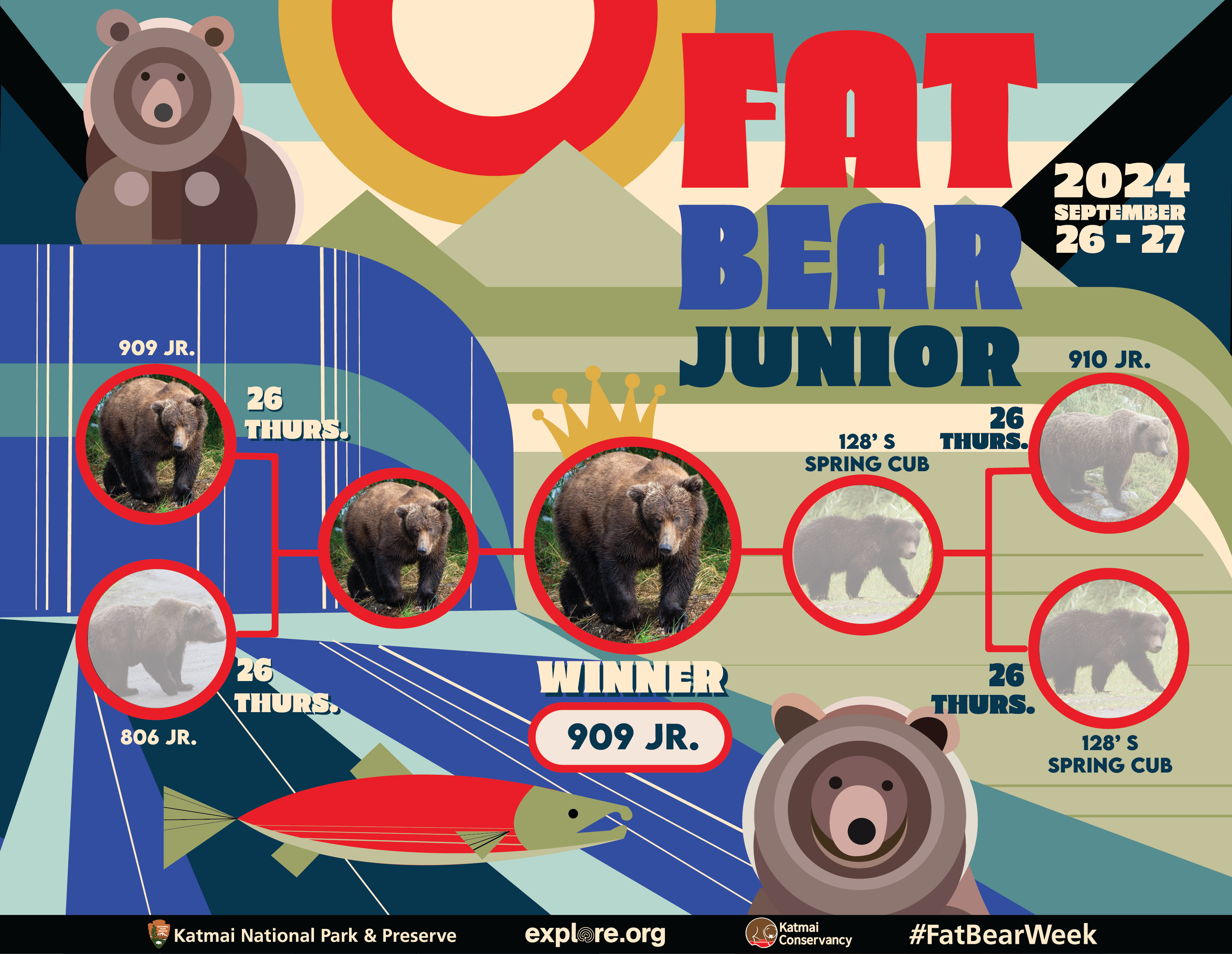
The complete Fat Bear Jr 2024 results

Fat Bear Week dates are not consistently the same each year but generally occur in the early fall, starting around late September or early October. The event is organized by the National Park Service and Explore.org, and anyone can participate by voting online for their preferred bear.

The competition has grown significantly since it was first launched as a Facebook vote in 2014. In 2025, it attracted over 1.5 million votes, up from 1.2 million the previous year.

=== Qualification criteria ===
In order to qualify for Fat Bear Week, brown bears of the Katmai National Park must have been spotted catching sockeye salmon at the Brooks River. A 1.5-mile (2.4 km) section of the river, which has webcams, is used to choose eligible bears. Bears must be seen not just in the fall but also in the summer season as well.

The subjective contest is a single-elimination tournament. Each day, two bears are presented in a match-up, identified by numbers. The bear with the most votes advances to the next round. In order to evaluate which bears have gained the most weight in preparation for hibernation, the public is able to view before and after photos of specific bears, watch them on livestream feeds, and read their biographies. The biographies include information on their feeding habits, personality traits, and physical features. The winner of the final match-up is named the tournament champion.

=== Winners ===
Year	Bear #	Nickname(s)	Source
2014	480	Otis	
2015	409	Beadnose	
2016	480	Otis	
2017	480	Otis	
2018	409	Beadnose	
2019	435	Holly	
2020	747	Colbert	
2021	480	Otis	
2022	747	Colbert	
2023	128	Grazer	
2024	128	Grazer	
2025	32	Chunk	
2026	89	Backpack	

=== Fat Bear Junior winners ===
Year	Bear
2021	132's spring cub
2022	909's yearling
2023	806's spring cub
2024	909 Jr
2025	128's yearling

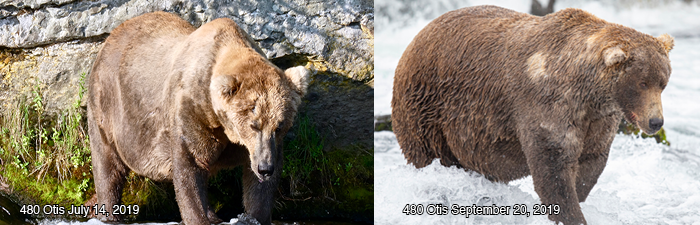
Otis, winner in 2014, 2016, 2017, and 2021

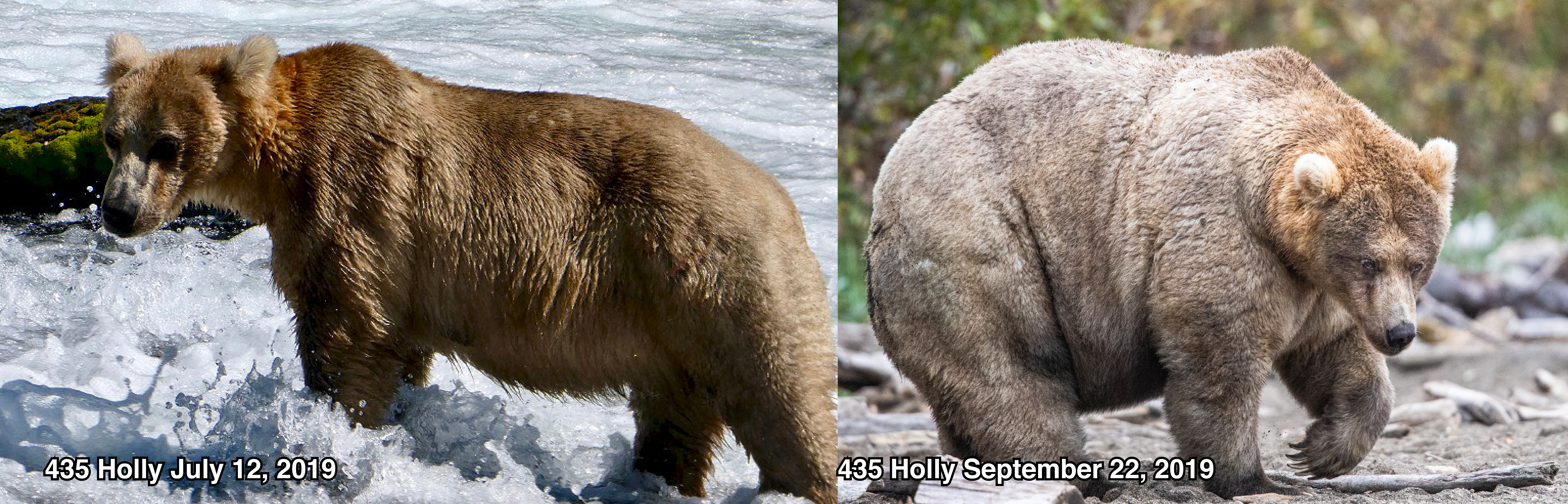
Holly, winner in 2019

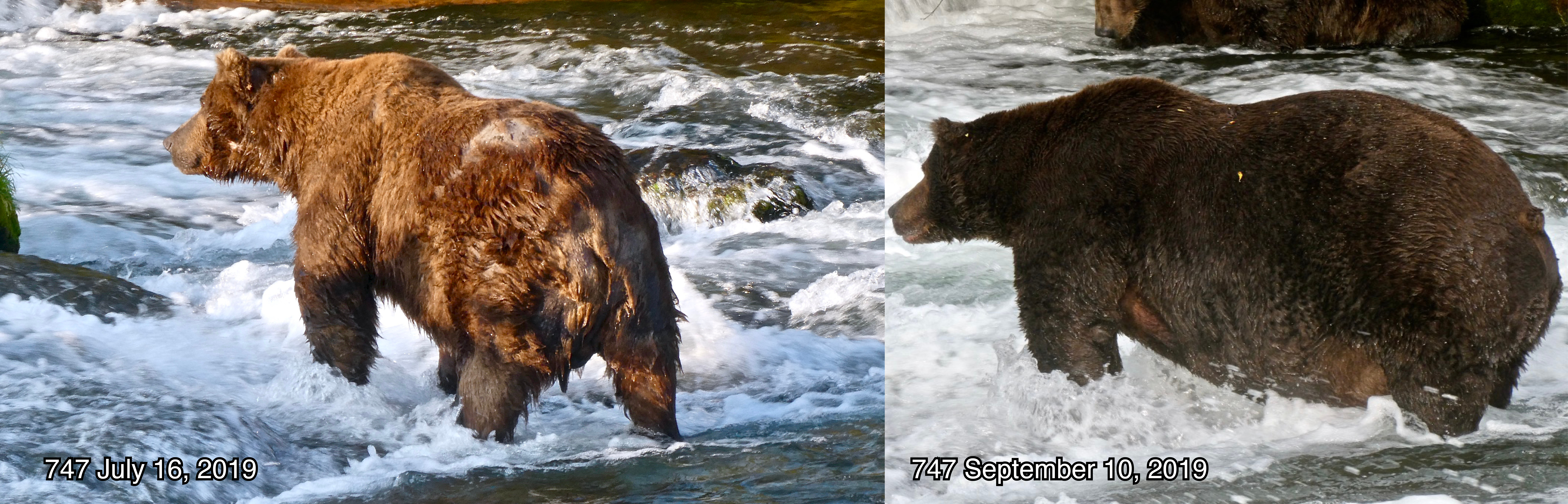
Bear #747, winner in 2020 and 2022

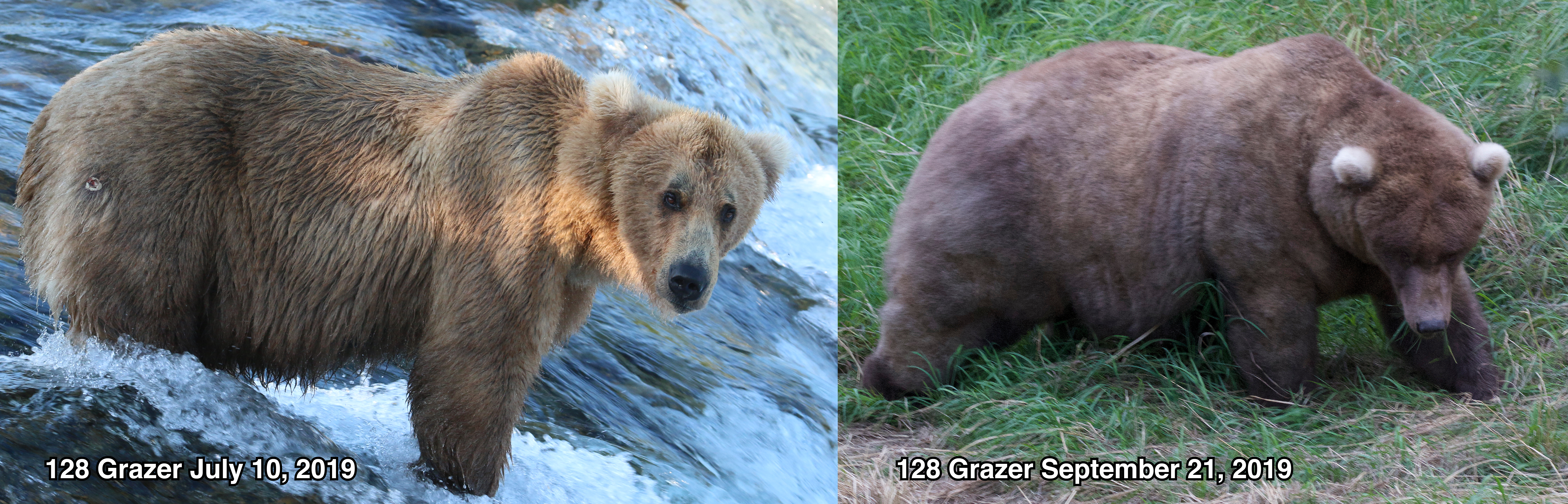
Grazer, winner in 2023 and 2024

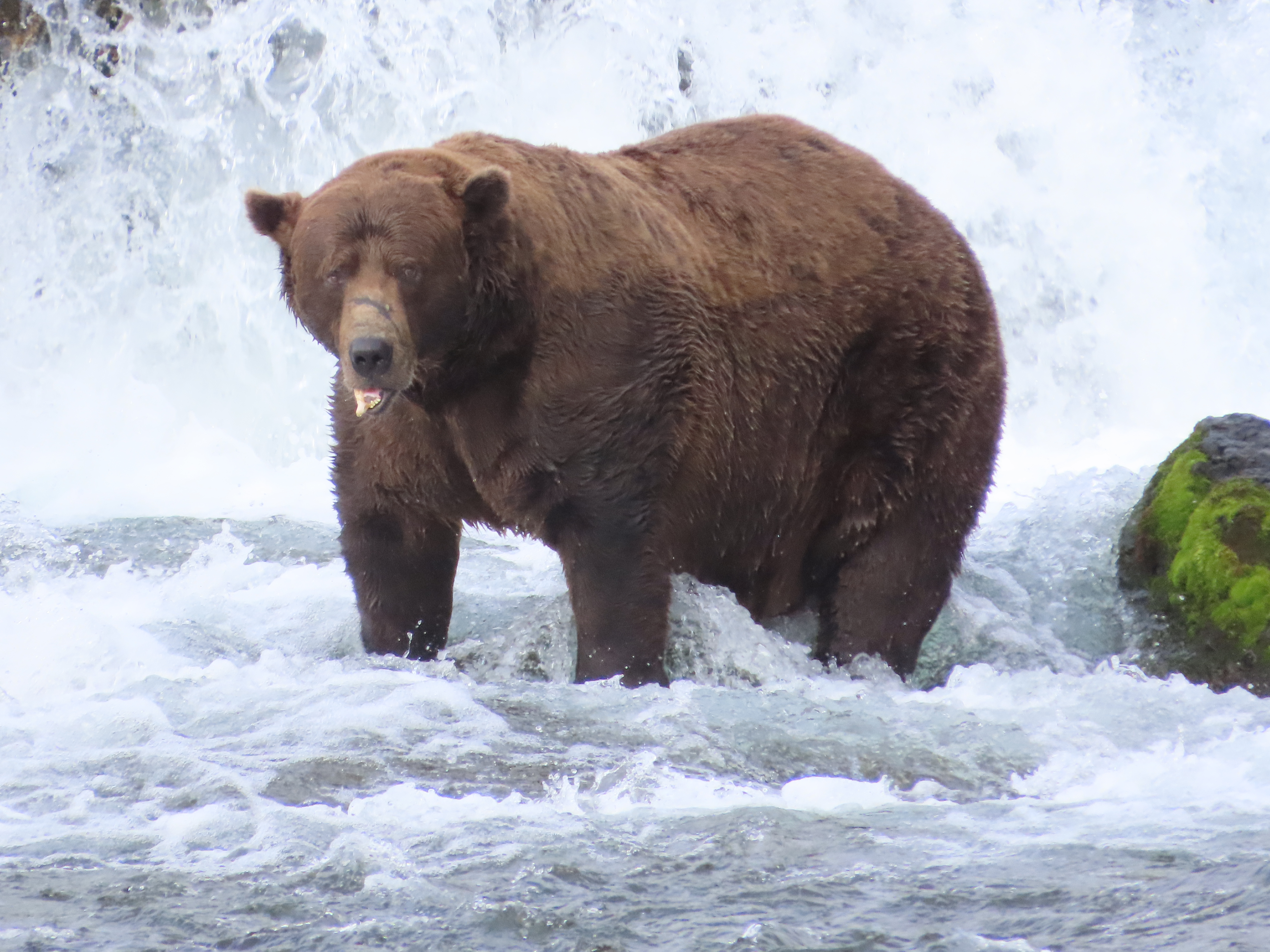
32 Chunk, winner in 2025

== See also ==
- Fat Marmot Week, similar event for the Yellow-bellied marmot
- List of individual bears
