= Rocky Mountain Biological Laboratory =

Mountain research station in Colorado, USA

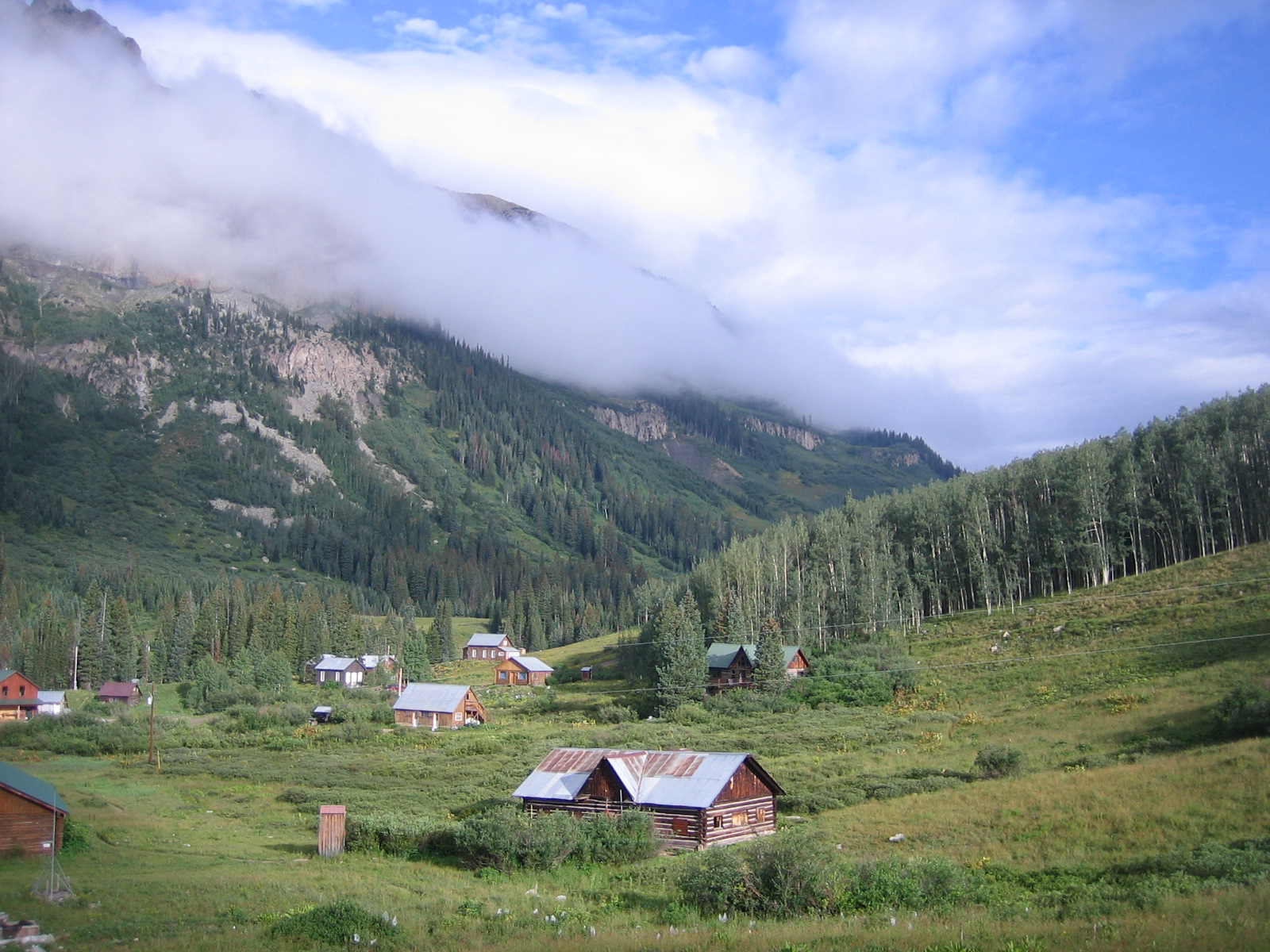
- Several RMBL buildings in Gothic, Colorado
- Established: 1928; 98 years ago
- Research type: High-altitude biological field station
- Director: Daniel T. Blumstein
- Staff: 180
- Location: Crested Butte, Colorado, United States; 38.9592°N 106.9897°W
- Affiliations: Organization of Biological Field Stations
- Website: rmbl.org

Map
- Location within Colorado

The Rocky Mountain Biological Laboratory (also known by its acronym RMBL — pronounced 'rumble') is a high-altitude biological field station located near Crested Butte, in the abandoned mining town of Gothic, Colorado in the West Elk Mountains. The laboratory was founded in 1928. Research areas include the ecology of the region, climate change, pollination biology, and a long-running study of the yellow-bellied marmot. The laboratory offers courses for undergraduate students, including National Science Foundation-funded REU students, and provides support for researchers from universities and colleges.

In 2025 RMBL lost its funding for The Marmot project due to the Trump administration cutting life science funding. In its urgency to find funding and bring attention to their plight, the project led since 2001 by Daniel Blumstein opened up an account on OnlyFans. The lab uploads daily G-rated marmot videos to the OnlyMarms site that are free to watch for OnlyFans subscribers but asks for tips. They have also launched a Fat Marmot Week in August 2026, started a meme coin, and a local brewery created a Marmot Tears IPA and is donating its proceeds.

== History ==
RMBL was founded in 1928 on the remains of an abandoned mining town in Gothic, Colorado. Approximately 180 people are in residence there during the summer field season. Over 1500 scientific publications have been based on work from the Laboratory (currently 30–50 per year).

== Research ==
The diversity and depth of research at the lab make the area around Gothic, Colorado a well-understood ecosystem. While scientists can use RMBL's facilities to study any topics relevant to the ecosystems around the Lab, a number of particular research areas have emerged as topics of particular interest. Charles Remington, an influential figure in the study of butterflies, spent a number of years working on the genetics of butterflies at the Lab. A number of other scientists, such as Paul R. Ehrlich, Carol L. Boggs, Ward Watt (former President of the California Academy of Sciences), Maureen Stanton, and Naomi Pierce, have also spent time working on butterflies at the Lab.

Among the geneticists who took their work to RMBL in the summer months was Edward Novitski, whose research in Drosophila melanogaster led to the posthumous creation of the Edward Novitski Prize, awarded by the Genetics Society of America to recognize an extraordinary level of creativity and intellectual ingenuity in solving significant problems in genetics research.

Climate change is another well-studied area at RMBL, fueled by researchers such as John Harte, who has been heating a Rocky Mountain meadow to measure the effects of long-term warming on soil moisture, nutrient cycling, and plant communities.

It is also home to one of the longest-running records of flowering phenology in North America, started in 1973 and continued to the present by David Inouye and his collaborators.

Pollination biology is another historical research strength of the lab, and close to a hundred scientists who work in that field have visited or worked there since the 1970s. Because 'introduced honeybees' do not survive at higher elevations such as the RMBL, a number of scientists, including Nickolas Waser, Mary V. Price, James D. Thomson, Diane R. Campbell, and David Inouye, who are interested in native pollination systems continue to work at the Lab.

Stream ecology is another research focus. J. David Allan conducted work on streams around the lab in the 1970s, and co-authored Stream Ecology. Structure and Function of Running Water. Barbara Peckarsky, one of the world's top stream ecologists, has worked on the streams for 30+ years along with collaborators from around the world.

The Laboratory also has studied the interplay between bacteria and ticks ("arthropods") since the Cold War era, which include Lyme disease bacterial variants Borrelia burgdorferi and Rickettsia rickettsii.

A number of scientists who have had an influence on environmental policy have also worked at the lab, including John P. Holdren, President Obama's National Science Advisor, Paul Ehrlich (author of The Population Bomb, and member of the National Academy of Sciences), Michael Soulé (founder of the Society for Conservation Biology), aquatic ecologist John Cairns, Jr. (member of the National Academy of Sciences), and Theo Colborn (author of Our Stolen Future).

Some of the scientists from RMBL have adopted a tradition of publicizing their work by marching in the Crested Butte, Colorado Fourth of July parade wearing leaf skirts made of corn lily (false skunk cabbage), and playing "trombones, kazoos, pots and pans".

RMBL is a member of the Organization of Biological Field Stations.

== Marmot study ==
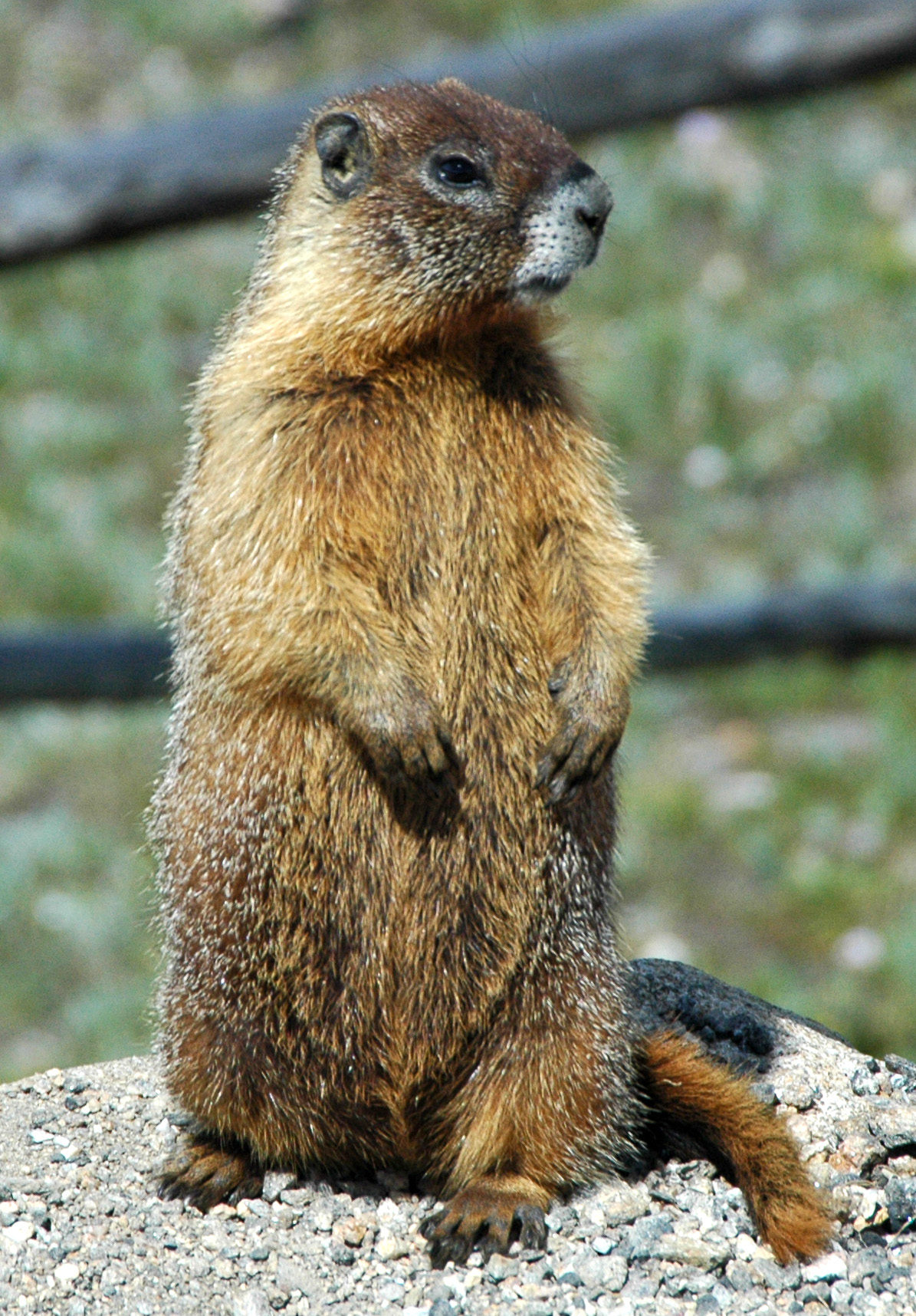
Marmota flaviventris (yellow-bellied marmot)

The lab is home to one of the longest-running mark-recapture studies of a non-game animal in the world. Kenneth Barclay Armitage started a study of yellow-bellied marmots in 1962 and it has been continued by UCLA professor of ecology and evolutionary biology, Daniel Blumstein, since 2001. The Marmot Project is the "second-longest study of individually identified mammals in the world, after Jane Goodall's chimpanzee study in Tanzania."

== OnlyMarms ==
In 2025, RMBL lost its federal funding due to the Trump administration "prioritize[ing] artificial intelligence, robotics and nuclear energy while reducing the government’s focus on what he (President Trump’s science adviser) called 'life sciences.'” In 2001, funding from the National Science Foundation was relatively easy to receive, but when Blumstein applied to renew the grant for another ten years, he was turned down three times and told to stop applying because they already had "too much data". Blumstein was surprised at the funding cuts because "studying evolutionary processes that play out over generations and for generating sound science for policymakers and land managers" means many decades of study.

Blumstein remembered watching the television show Margo's Got Money Troubles about a single mother who turned to OnlyFans as a way of making money. Blumstein thought, marmots also have money troubles and hit on the idea of posting G-rated marmot content on OnlyFans in order to bring attention to RMBL's plight. When he suggested this campaign to his lab assistants, someone suggested OnlyMarms as the name. The lab calls themselves "The Marmateers" and launched OnlyMarms in May 2026.

Blumstein ran into some difficulty at first with OnlyFans not accepting his driver's license when he created the account as his photo did not match an image of a marmot. After an email exchange with OnlyFans explaining the problem, and clearing up that the marmots were under the age of consent and that they were not planing on sexualizing their uploads, the account was live. Content is free to view, but Blumstein hoped for tips. After a few weeks, they had "about 2,900 visits and 112 subscribers, generating about $650 in tips, well short of what Dr. Blumstein said was required to continue the research for the foreseeable future." OnlyFans takes a cut of 20% off all donations.

According to Blumstein, tens of thousands of dollars are needed to fund the project and he has little hope that OnlyMarms will get close to bringing in the needed money. He hopes that media attention will bring in grants for funding. “'It’s just frustrating,” Dr. Blumstein said, noting that he should be dedicating time to writing papers or working with students. "But we’re doing this” he said, “which is kind of silly in the long run.” In an interview with NPR Blumstein explained that they need "$75,000 to $100,000 to be able to support graduate students to keep this thing going. And that, unfortunately, is what the federal government used to do." By early August 2026, OnlyMarms had raised about $4,000 after OnlyFans took its cut.

First-year master's student Emily Renkey is responsible for posting content that she thinks will educate and provide "aws" to the viewers. The few hundred dollars raised so far has paid for the bait that is needed to lure the marmots "close enough to study". OnlyMarms is not the only way RMBL is seeking funds for the project. Local Irwin Brewing Company has created a "Marmot Tears" IPA with proceeds going to RMBL. Also, the lab started a "Fat Marmot Week" competition, resembling Fat Bear Week run by the Katmai National Park and Preserve in Alaska. According to Blumstein, “'The epitome of a marmot is one that looks like a bread loaf by the end of the season. Body positivity is all about marmots. I mean, you want these guys to get obese'”.

== See also ==
- Bibliography of Colorado
- Geography of Colorado
- History of Colorado
- Index of Colorado-related articles
- List of Colorado-related lists
  - List of ghost towns in Colorado
  - List of post offices in Colorado
- Outline of Colorado
