= Gothic, Colorado =

Ghost town in US state of Colorado

Gothic
- Ghost town
- Gothic, Colorado
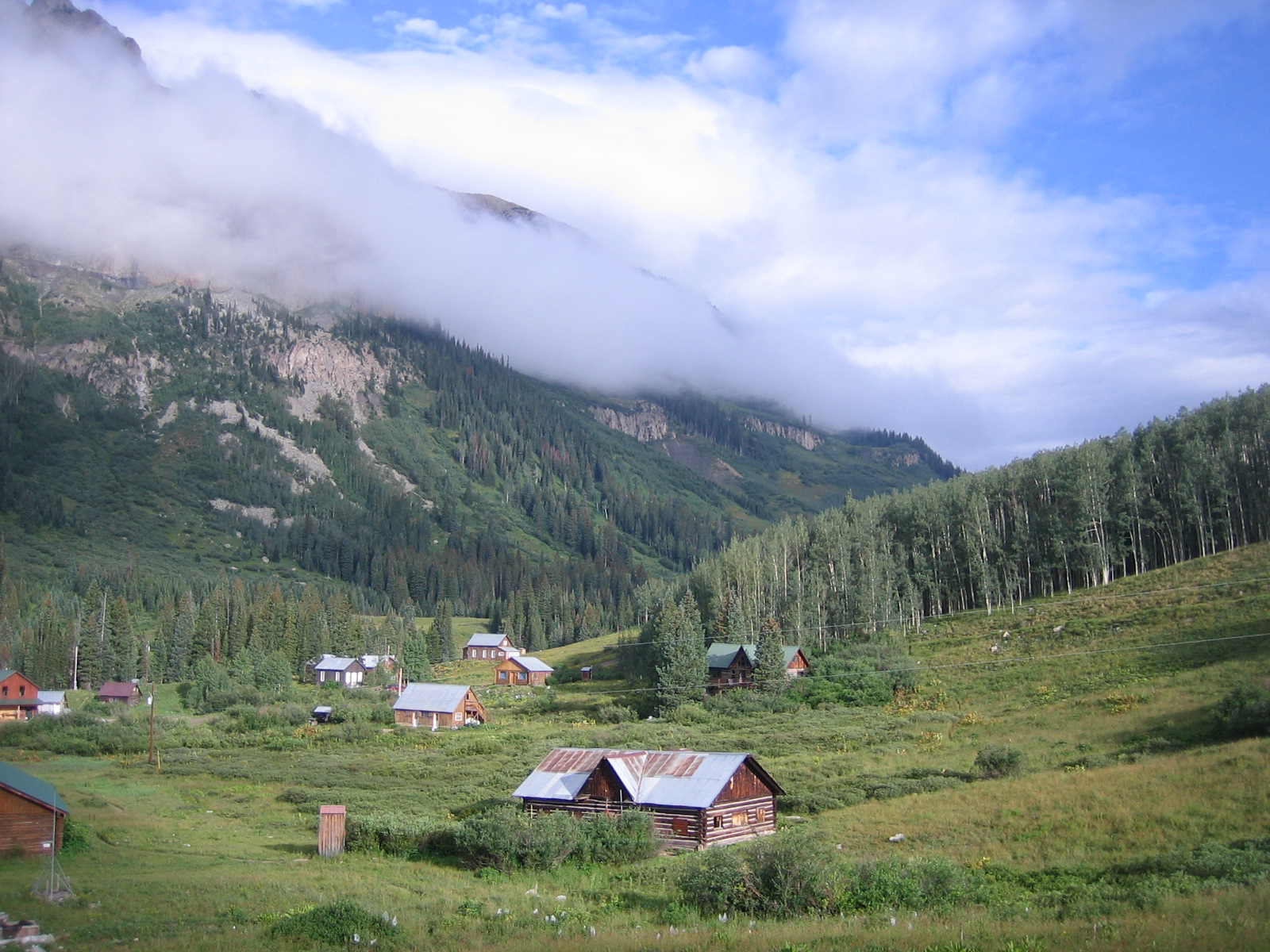
- Gothic, Colorado, behind some buildings of the Rocky Mountain Biological Laboratory

- Gothic
- Coordinates: 38.9592°N 106.9897°W
- Elevation: 2,900 m (9,500 ft)

Population
  - Total: Seasonal
- Time zone: Mountain

Gothic, Colorado is a ghost town in the American state of Colorado. It is in the West Elk Mountains.

Despite being a ghost town, It is occupied during the summer months. It serves as the high-altitude biological field station of the Rocky Mountain Biological Laboratory, near Crested Butte.

== Gothic's history ==
In 1879, an explosion at the nearby Sylvanite Mine rocked the Gothic area. The blast shot strands of "wire-silver." Soon, prospectors arrived, and Gothic exploded.

Getting its name from Gothic Mountain, Gothic was incorporated on July 17, 1879, a mining town. Gothic was a silver boomtown in the 1880s, and had over 100 residents and a post office. Also discovered was galena, gold, ruby silver ore, and pyrite.

In 1880, former US president Ulysses S. Grant visited. Horace Tabor put money in the Elk Mountain Bonanza newspaper. Reality seemed ideal.

Silver prices crashed in 1893 with the Sherman Silver Purchase Act. By 1914, town had one resident. From the initial building boom, only the saloon still stands.

Over a decade since Gothic had been declared a ghost town, the land was purchased by one Dr. John Johnson. It was converted into the Rocky Mountain Biological Laboratory. In the summer, around 160 live there, and billy barr, who prefers lower-case, has been there since 1973, and has done important environmental observations.

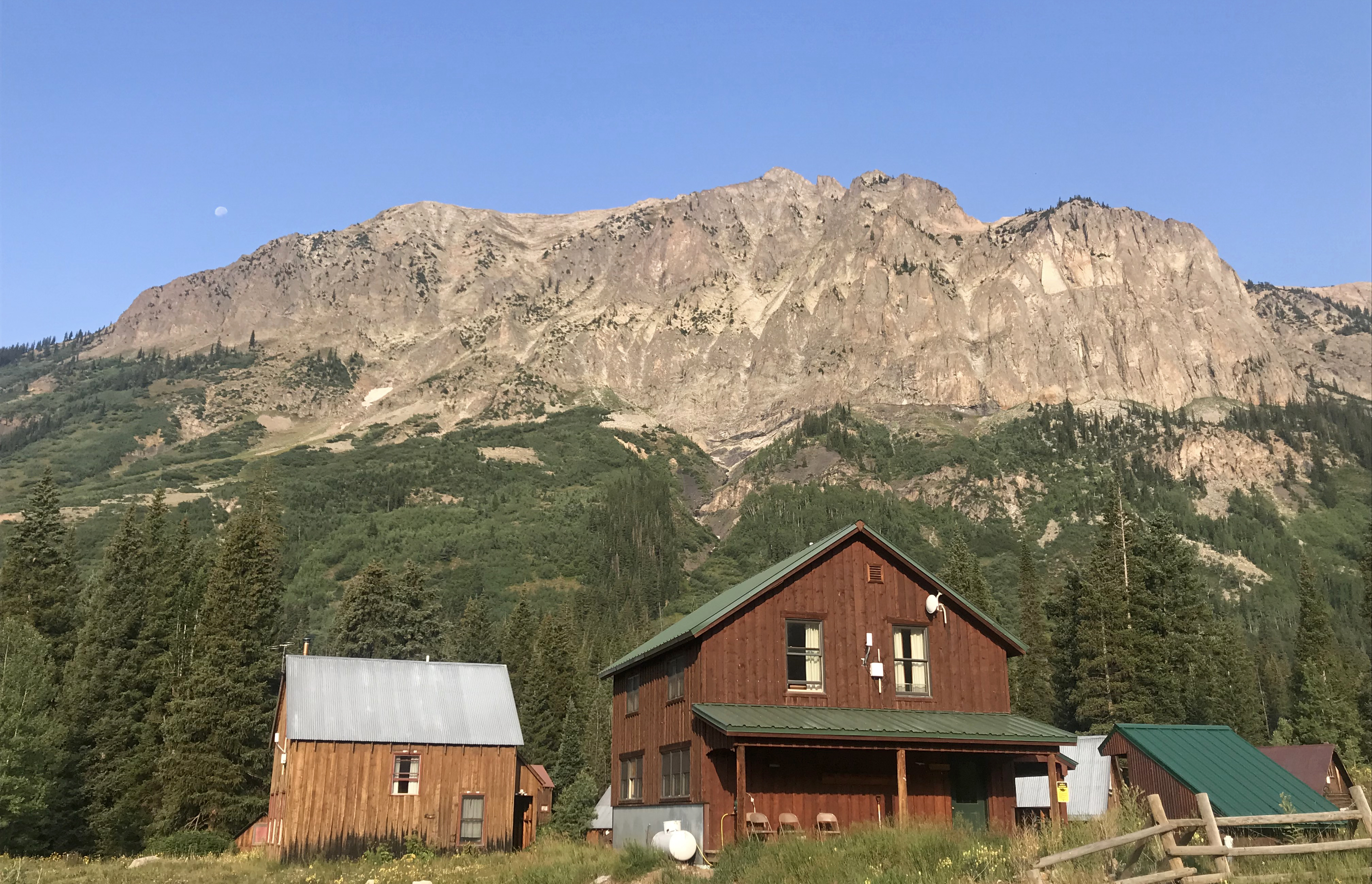
Gothic Peak, with buildings part of the Rocky Mountain Biological Laboratory

== See also ==
- Bibliography of Colorado
- Billy Barr (naturalist)
- Geography of Colorado
- History of Colorado
- Index of Colorado-related articles
- List of Colorado-related lists
  - List of ghost towns in Colorado
- Outline of Colorado

== External links and references ==
- Current weather in and round Gothic
- Much history
- Things to do in Gothic
- Uncovercolorado.com on Gothic
- A modern map of Gothic, complete with the Rocky Mountain Biological Laboratory
- ghosttowns.com on Gothic
- Some photos
- The Colorado Ghost Town Of Gothic Has A History Thanks To This Century-Old Laboratory. Now It Has A Future, Too
