= Rockit Fuel Only =

Studio album by Evan Johns
- Released: 1991
- Label: Rykodisc
- Producer: Evan Johns

Evan Johns chronology
Please Mr. Santa Claus (1990)	Rockit Fuel Only (1991)

Rockit Fuel Only is an album by the American musician Evan Johns, released in 1991. He is credited with his backing band, the H-Bombs. Johns supported the album with a North American tour.

== Production ==
Rockit Fuel Only was produced by Johns, who also played mandolin on the album. It was recorded in Dallas. Drummer Jim Starboard sings lead on one track.

"Dig That Boogie" is a cover of the Roy Hall song; "Burnin' Over What I Done" is about the televangelist Jimmy Swaggart.

== Critical reception ==
Professional ratings
Review scores
Source	Rating
AllMusic	3/5 stars
Chicago Tribune	1.5/4 stars
Houston Chronicle	4/4 stars
MusicHound Rock: The Essential Album Guide	3.5/5 stars
Orlando Sentinel	5/5 stars

Trouser Press wrote that "'Boogie Disease' and 'Little Scene Setter' are among the rip-it-up corkers that keep Evan Johns among rock'n'roll's guitar elite." The Orlando Sentinel thought that Johns "detonates his guitar with unpredictable but always spine-shaking results on everything from the monumentally grungy 'Back in the Back Seat' to the roaring 'Little Scene Setter' to the Texas-swinging-out-of-orbit 'Under the Willows in Dixie' to the wistful 'Meant for You'."

The Austin American-Statesman noted that "Johns is more an extremist than a revivalist." The Chicago Tribune complained that "it takes nearly three-quarters of the album and a swaying little tune called 'In the Groove' before he and the band find a groove that isn't just a mindless boogie stomp (with lyrics to match)." The Houston Chronicle concluded that "Johns is in a class by himself when it comes to imagination and fretboard exploration"; the paper later listed the album among the 40 best of 1991.

AllMusic wrote: "Johns' craggy vocals make this 100-proof roadhouse rock even when he's in a relatively mellow mood, and it's never too long before he kicks things back into overdrive on fourth-gear rockers like 'Back in the Backseat', 'Sugary Action', and the title cut."

== Track listing ==
No.	Title	Length
1.	"Back in the Backseat"
2.	"Little Scene Setter"
3.	"Under the Willows in Dixie"
4.	"Rockit Fuel Only"
5.	"Meant for You"
6.	"Prove It to Each Other"
7.	"Boogie Disease"
8.	"Who You Are (Where Are You?)"
9.	"In the Groove"
10.	"Dig That Boogie"
11.	"Sugary Action"
12.	"Burnin' Over What I Done"
13.	"You Always Go"
14.	"Juvenile Delinquent"
