= Kathleen Donohue =

American botanist

- Citizenship: US
- Education: Stanford University; University of Chicago
- Scientific career
- Institutions: University of Kentucky; Harvard University; Duke University

Kathleen Donohue is an American biologist at Duke University. She researches the genetic and ecological context of adaptation. She received a Guggenheim Fellowship for her work and was elected as a Fellow of the American Association for the Advancement of Science.

== Education ==
Kathleen Donohue attended Stanford University, graduating in 1985 with bachelor's degrees in Biology and Medieval Studies. As a Stanford undergraduate, she conducted research with Ward Watt. She then attended the University of Chicago for her master's degree (1988) and PhD (1993). Her doctoral advisors were Ellen Simms and Stevan Arnold, and her dissertation was entitled "The evolution of seed dispersal in Cakile edentula var. lacustris".

== Career ==
In her early career, she was a faculty member at the Morgan School of Biological Sciences at the University of Kentucky and subsequently at the Department of Organismic and Evolutionary Biology at Harvard University. In 2008 she was hired at Duke University as an Associate Professor of Biology. She was appointed to Full Professor in 2012. She researches the genetic and ecological basis of adaptation, including phenotypic plasticity, maternal effects, epigenetics, niche construction, biological dispersal, natural selection at multiple scales. From 2017 to 2020 she was director of Duke's University Program in Ecology.

=== Selected publications ===
Donohue, K., (Editor and commentator). 2011. Darwin’s Finches: Readings in the Evolution of a Scientific Paradigm. University of Chicago Press.

- Donohue, Kathleen; Rubio De Casas, Rafael; Burghardt, Liana; Kovach, Katherine; Willis, Charles G. (2010). "Germination, Postgermination Adaptation, and Species Ecological Ranges". Annual Review of Ecology, Evolution, and Systematics. 41: 293–319. doi:10.1146/annurev-ecolsys-102209-144715.
- Donohue, Kathleen (2009). "Completing the cycle: Maternal effects as the missing link in plant life histories". Philosophical Transactions of the Royal Society B: Biological Sciences. 364 (1520): 1059–1074. doi:10.1098/rstb.2008.0291. PMC 2666684. PMID 19324611.
- Donohue, Kathleen; Dorn, Lisa; Griffith, Converse; Kim, Eunsuk; Aguilera, Anna; Polisetty, Chandra R.; Schmitt, Johanna (2005). "The Evolutionary Ecology of Seed Germination of Arabidopsis Thaliana: Variable Natural Selection on Germination Timing". Evolution. 59 (4): 758–770. doi:10.1111/j.0014-3820.2005.tb01751.x. PMID 15926687. S2CID 840152.

== Awards and honors ==
In 2013 she was awarded a Guggenheim Fellowship in the plant sciences division. She was elected fellow of the American Association for the Advancement of Science in 2012. She was a fellow of the National Institute for Mathematical and Biological Synthesis in 2013, a Scholar of the National Evolutionary Synthesis Center in 2013, and a Bullard Fellow at Harvard University in 2001. In 2017 she served as president of the American Society of Naturalists.
