= Emerson Preparatory School =

Location
- 1718 Connecticut Ave NW; Washington, D.C. 20009; United States

Information
- Type: Independent College Preparatory School
- Established: 1852
- Closed: 2021
- Enrollment: 55-75 (grades 9-12)
- Campus type: Urban
- Colors: Burgundy and gold
- Mascot: Owl

Emerson Preparatory School (also known as Emerson) was a small private high school in Northwest Washington, D.C., founded in 1852 as the Emerson Institute. It was Washington's oldest co-ed college preparatory school. The school closed at the end of the 2020-21 school year.

The school was located inside the Clocktower Building in Dupont Circle. Emerson had occupied that location since 2019, after moving from a temporary location in the Twelfth Street YMCA Building. Before 2017, Emerson spent eighty years in their own building across from the American Enterprise Institute. Most students used WMATA to get to and from school.

Emerson Preparatory School was a member of the Association of Independent Maryland and DC Schools (AIMS).

== History ==
Emerson was founded in the District of Columbia in 1852 by Charles Bedford Young, Ph.D., as a school to prepare Washington area boys for entrance to Harvard. It was named for George Barrell Emerson, a noted New England educator, author, and Harvard graduate. After the Civil War the school's graduates began to attend other colleges and universities, and, in 1920, Emerson became Washington's first coeducational preparatory school.

Emerson's school seal featured an image of the U.S. Capitol dome and the date 1852. The school mascot is the owl, symbolizing wisdom.

In the two years leading up to the COVID-19 pandemic, Emerson moved locations twice, later under the guidance of a new Head of School. Much of the teaching staff was let go as the school adopted an online model in response to the pandemic. The school closed at the end of the 2020-21 school year, stating that conditions were not conducive to operating Emerson in a financially sustainable manner.

== Staff and faculty ==
John Julian Humphrey Sr. became principal of Emerson's evening school in 1939, subsequently becoming headmaster at Emerson for 55 years, although his tenure was interrupted by World War Two. He also taught law, U.S. history and government, continuing to tutor students until his death.

A graduate of Emerson, Margot Walsh served as director of the school until 1999. She filled various roles at Emerson for almost 50 years, including as registrar.

== Student body ==
During its early history, Emerson had sports and drama teams.

== Locations ==
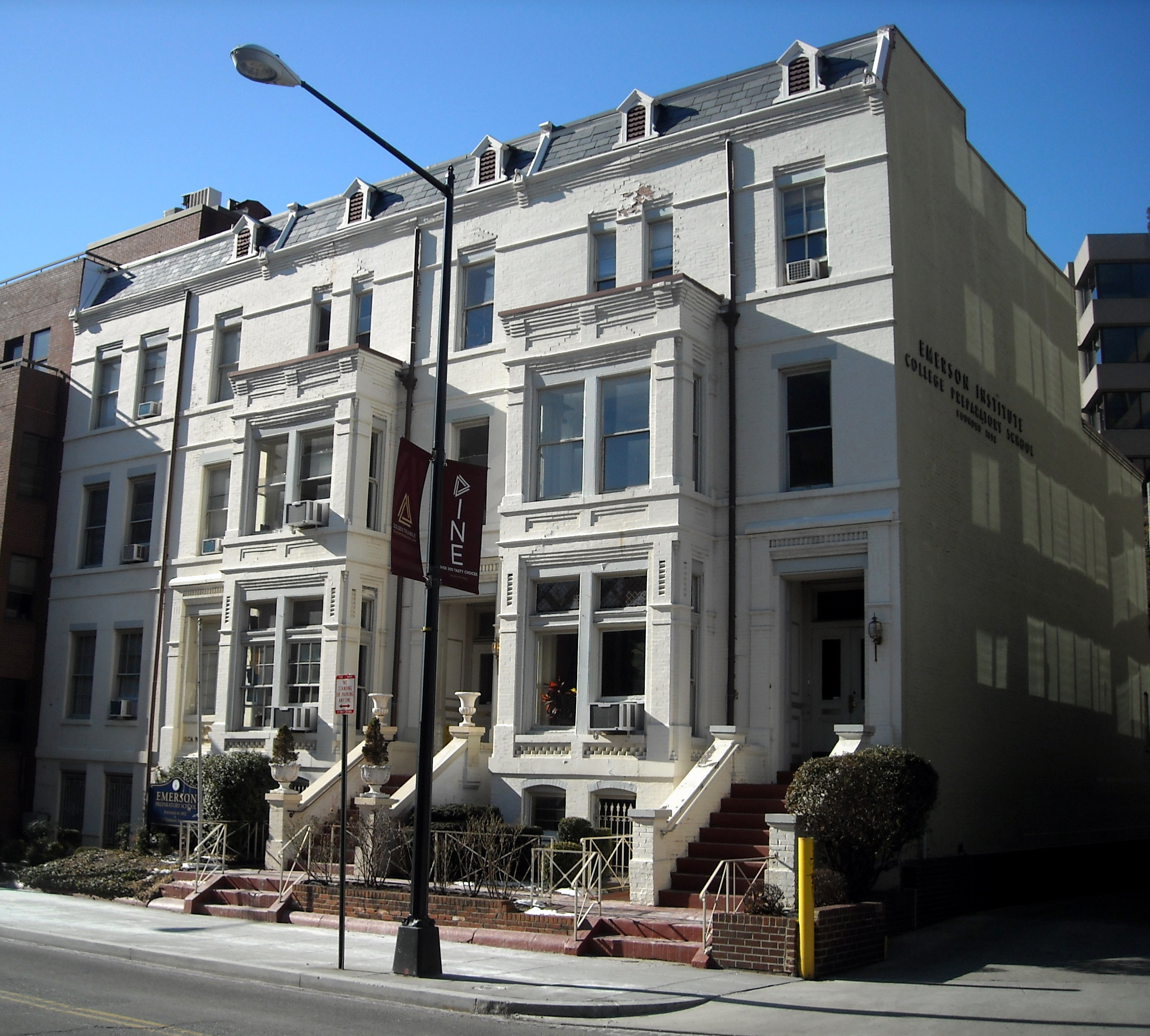
Emerson's former location near Dupont Circle, where it was located for eighty years

Emerson first opened at 914 14th Street Northwest Washington DC near Franklin Square between K and I Streets. In 1928, Emerson moved to a new building at 1740 P Street NW between Massachusetts and New Hampshire Avenues. In 1933, Emerson moved to 1525 16th Street NW near Stead Park between Q and Church Streets. In 1937, Emerson moved to 1324 18th Street NW near Dupont Circle between Massachusetts and Connecticut Avenues. In 2017, Emerson moved to a temporary location, the fourth floor of the Thurgood Marshall Center for Service and Heritage. In 2019, Emerson moved to the fourth floor of the Clocktower Building in Dupont Circle (1718 Connecticut Avenue NW).

== Notable alumni ==
- Brian Baker, guitarist and founding member of Minor Threat
- Brendan Canty, drummer for Fugazi
- James M. Cutts, Medal of Honor recipient
- William F. Gibson, noted science fiction writer and "noir-prophet" of cyberpunk
- Jesse Root Grant, youngest son of Ulysses S. Grant (attended)
- Ulysses S. Grant Jr., second son of Ulysses S. Grant (attended)
- Evan Johns, Grammy nominated rockabilly guitarist
- Jared Leto, Academy Award winning actor and vocalist of the alternative rock band 30 Seconds To Mars
- Bruce Magruder, U.S. Army major general
- Cat Marnell, socialite and writer
- John Sirica, United States district judge famous for role in Watergate (attended)
