= Ward Watt =

American evolutionary biologist (1940–2024)

- Born: October 21, 1940
- Died: October 27, 2024 (aged 84)
- Scientific career
- Workplaces: Stanford University; University of South Carolina

Ward Belfield Watt (October 21, 1940 – October 27, 2024) was an American evolutionary biologist who served as a professor of biology at Stanford University and at the University of South Carolina. He was known for studying evolution using biochemical, physiological, and ecological approaches. For over 50 years, Watt conducted field studies at the Rocky Mountain Biological Laboratory in Gothic, Colorado. There he worked primarily on Colias butterflies. He developed these butterflies into a model system for the study of natural selection in the wild. He was known for studying the impact of wing pigmentation polymorphism on thermoregulation and on fitness. He was also known for studying the impact of natural amino acid variation in enzymes of central metabolism on insect flight performance. He championed the idea that adaptation and constraint are distinct elements in evolution, prior to fitness differences.

== Early life ==
Educated at Sidwell Friends School in Washington, D.C., Watt developed an early interest in entomology. In 1955, he wrote to the lepidopterist Charles Remington for advice on a high school science fair project on polymorphism in Colias. Under Remington's guidance, Watt studied for a Bachelor's (1962), a Master's (1964), and a PhD (1967) at Yale University. After graduation, from 1967 to 1969, he served as a captain in the Medical Service Corps in the U.S. Army. He was hired in the Department of Biology at Stanford University in 1969.

== Career ==
Watt published more than 75 book chapters and peer-reviewed journal articles and co-edited a book volume on subjects including pteridine pigment biosynthesis, thermal biology, population structure, butterfly mating behavior and systematics. Along with Christopher Wheat, he published a paper in 2023 in Science Advances identifying the genetic basis of the 'alba' wing color polymorphism in Colias butterflies.

Over his career, Watt was an influential mentor to more than 60 undergraduates, 21 grad students and 7 postdocs. He was recognized for his effective teaching and mentoring with several awards. In 1992 Stanford University awarded him the Allan Cox Medal for Excellence in Fostering Undergraduate Research. Biologists Bruce Tabashnik, Joel Kingsolver, Johanna Schmitt, Christopher Wheat, Claire Kremen, Frances Chew, Paul Sherman, Adriana Briscoe, Maureen Stanton, Darren Irwin, Patrick Carter, Benjamin Blackman, Robert Raguso, and Kathleen Donohue were among the students and lab members he trained who went on to have impactful careers in biology.

== Views on evolutionary genetics ==
Watt was a defender of the study of evolutionary genetics. In 1997 he publicly sparred with Richard Lewontin over advances in the field during a symposium in honor of the 60th anniversary of Theodosius Dobzhansky's book, Genetics and the Origin of Species, held at the National Academy of Sciences Arnold and Mabel Beckman Center in Irvine, CA. While Lewontin remarked that the field had hardly changed since Dobzhansky's book had been published decades earlier, Watt and other participants disagreed.

Much of Watt's work focused on the study of candidate genes, specifically by examining the enzymes of central metabolism. His work on phosphoglucose isomerase (PGI) is a detailed case study of the role of balancing selection in maintaining allelic diversity.

== Service to science ==
Watt made significant and long-standing contributions to the robustness of scientific institutions by serving in a variety of roles. He served as vice-president (2002–2003) and then president (2003–2008) of the California Academy of Sciences and as vice-president and president (1987–1988) of the board of trustees of the Rocky Mountain Biological Laboratory (RMBL). He wrote about the importance of scientific collections to biological research. In 2024, he was recognized for his contributions with the RMBL Lifetime Distinguished Service Award.

== Personal life and death ==
Watt had two daughters from his first marriage to Alice Godfrey: journalist Jean Godfrey-June and Laura Alice Watt, an environmental historian. After retiring from Stanford University in 2013 as Distinguished Professor Emeritus, Watt moved to the University of South Carolina, with his wife, Professor Carol Boggs, where he maintained a lab until 2022.

Watt died on October 27, 2024, at the age of 84.

== Edited volumes ==
- Butterflies: Ecology and Evolution Taking Flight with Carol L. Boggs and Paul R. Ehrlich. Chicago, IL: University of Chicago Press, 2003.

== Selected publications ==
- Watt, W.B.1967. Pteridine biosynthesis in the butterfly Colias eurytheme. Journal of Biological Chemistry 242: 565–572. Redirecting
- Watt, W.B. 1968. Adaptive significance of pigment polymorphisms in Colias butterflies. I. Variation of melanin pigment in relation to thermoregulation. Evolution 22: 437–458. ADAPTIVE SIGNIFICANCE OF PIGMENT POLYMORPHISMS IN COLIAS BUTTERFLIES. I. VARIATION OF MELANIN PIGMENT IN RELATION TO THERMOREGULATION
- Watt, W.B. 1977. Adaptation at specific loci. I. Natural selection on phosphoglucose isomerase of Colias butterflies: biochemical and population aspects. Genetics 87: 177–194. ADAPTATION AT SPECIFIC LOCI. I. NATURAL SELECTION ON PHOSPHOGLUCOSE ISOMERASE OF COLIAS BUTTERFLIES: BIOCHEMICAL AND POPULATION ASPECTS
- Watt, W.B., P.A. Carter, and K. Donohue. 1986. An insect mating system promotes the choice of "good genotypes" as mates. Science 233: 1187–1190. Females' Choice of "Good Genotypes" as Mates Is Promoted by an Insect Mating System
- Kingsolver, J.G., & W.B. Watt. 1983. Thermoregulatory strategies in Colias butterflies: Thermal stress and the limits to adaptation in temporally varying environments. American Naturalist 121: 32–55. JSTOR 2461044
- Watt, W.B. 1992. Eggs, enzymes, and evolution — natural genetic variants change insect fecundity. Proceedings of the National Academy of Science USA 89: 10608-10612. Eggs, enzymes, and evolution: natural genetic variants change insect fecundity.
- Watt, W.B. 1995. Descent with modification: evolutionary study of Colias in the tradition of Charles Remington. Journal of the Lepidopterists Society 49: 272–284.
- Nielsen, M.G., and W.B. Watt. 2000. Interference competition and sexual selection promote the maintenance of polymorphism in Colias (Lepidoptera, Pieridae). Functional Ecology 14: 718–730. Interference competition and sexual selection promote polymorphism in Colias (Lepidoptera, Pieridae)
- Tunström, K., Woronik, A., Hanly, J.J., Rastas, P., Chichvarkhin, A., Warren, A.D., Kawahara, A.Y., Schoville, S.D., Ficarrotta, V., Porter, A.H., Watt, W.B., Martin, A., and Wheat, C.W. 2023. Evidence for a single, ancient origin of a genus-wide alternative life history strategy. Science Advances 9, eabq3713. Evidence for a single, ancient origin of a genus-wide alternative life history strategy
