= Bruce Tabashnik =

American entomologist

Bruce Elliot Tabashnik is an American entomologist best known for Bt cotton efficacy research. He is a professor and researcher at the University of Arizona. In 2023, he was elected to the National Academy of Sciences.

== Education and academic career ==
Tabashnik completed his undergraduate studies in Zoology at the University of Michigan in 1975, and then received a PhD from Stanford University in 1981, studying under Ward Watt. He is a professor in the University of Arizona's Department of Entomology.

== Recognition ==
In 2007 Tabashnik was made a Fellow of the Entomological Society of America. Then in 2020 he was given the Lifetime Achievement Award by the ESA's Plant-Insect Ecosystems section. His honorary lecture was given by longtime collaborator, Yves Carrière.

== Notable publications ==
- Roush, Richard; Tabashnik, Bruce (1990). "Modeling and Evaluation of Resistance Management Tactics". Pesticide Resistance in Arthropods. Boston, Mass, US: Springer Science and Business Media LLC. pp. 153–182. doi:10.1007/978-1-4684-6429-0_6. ISBN 978-1-4684-6431-3. OCLC 840289391. S2CID 127910995. ISBN 978-1-4684-6429-0.
- Roush, Richard; Tabashnik, Bruce (1991). Pesticide Resistance in Arthropods. Boston, Mass, US: Springer Publishing. pp. ix+303. doi:10.1007/978-1-4684-6429-0. ISBN 978-1-4684-6431-3. OCLC 840289391. S2CID 43656561. ISBN 978-1-4684-6429-0.
- Tabashnik, Bruce; Gassmann, Aaron; Crowder, David; Carriére, Yves (2008). "Insect resistance to Bt crops: evidence versus theory". Nature Biotechnology. 26 (2). Nature Portfolio: 199–202. doi:10.1038/nbt1382. ISSN 1087-0156. PMID 18259177. S2CID 205273664.
- Tabashnik, Bruce E.; Brévault, Thierry; Carrière, Yves (2013). "Insect resistance to Bt crops: lessons from the first billion acres". Nature Biotechnology. 31 (6). Nature Portfolio: 510–521. doi:10.1038/nbt.2597. ISSN 1087-0156. PMID 23752438. S2CID 205278530.
- Tabashnik, Bruce; Mota-Sanchez, David; Whalon, Mark; Hollingworth, Robert; Carrière, Yves (2014). "Defining Terms for Proactive Management of Resistance to Bt Crops and Pesticides". Journal of Economic Entomology. 107 (2). Oxford University Press (Entomological Society of America (ESA)): 496–507. doi:10.1603/ec13458. ISSN 0022-0493. PMID 24772527. S2CID 11761620.
