= Otis (bear) =

Bear in Katmai National Park (c. 1996 – c. 2023)

- Otis in July 2022, from KatmaiNPS
- Species: Ursus arctos gyas
- Sex: Male
- Born: c. 1996
- Died: c. 2023 (aged at least 26)
- Known for: Four-time Fat Bear Week winner

Otis, also known as Bear 480 (c. 1996 – c. 2023), was a brown bear living in Katmai National Park and Preserve in Alaska. He was best known for winning Fat Bear Week four times (2014, 2016, 2017, and 2021). His appearances on Katmai bear cameras and in Fat Bear Week earned him an online following, and Katmai named a fund after the bear.

== Life ==
Otis was first identified at Brooks Falls in 2001, at which point he was estimated to be 4–6 years old. Otis was never weighed, but park staff estimated his weight to be 1,000 pounds (450 kg).

=== Appearance ===
In 2019, Otis was estimated to weigh over 900 pounds (410 kg) as he entered hibernation. Otis's right ear was floppy due to a healed injury. By 2021, Otis was missing two of his canine teeth, and many of his others were heavily worn down. One ranger noted in 2023, "if you see a bear with a floppy left [sic] ear, who's pretty old and he's got like two teeth, that is definitely 480". Some bear cam viewers suggested he "resembles a well-loved teddy bear".

=== Personality ===
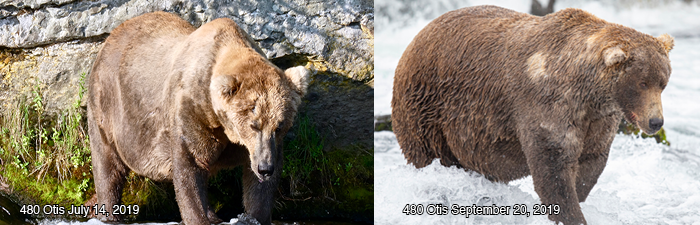
Otis in July and September 2019. Note the contrast in size.

Otis became known for his patient fishing strategy, choosing to sit on the shore of the Brooks River and scoop up fish rather than actively seek out fish within the river. Fans nicknamed Otis' favorite fishing spot "The Office". Sometimes, Otis would be so focused on the water that he appeared to be napping. He also tended to avoid conflict with other bears, leading him to be called a "zen master".

== Celebrity ==
In 2014, when Otis was about 18 years old, Katmai National Park and Preserve held a March Madness inspired event called "Fat Bear Tuesday". The park's visitor center displayed photos of several individual bears before and after gaining weight for the winter, and asked guests to vote for their favorite. Otis was one of the featured bears, and won the competition. In 2015, Katmai repeated the contest, this time extending it to a full week and allowing those on social media to vote. This was the first formal Fat Bear Week. Otis lost this round to Bear #409, nicknamed "Beadnose", but won the 2016, 2017, and 2021 contests.

Otis with a salmon

Otis was one of the most popular bears among fans. Some cited his "perseverance" and "will to live", in addition to his calm personality, as his appeal. Outside's Erin Berger called the phenomenon "the healthiest parasocial relationship we'll ever be in." Otis was described in media as a "chonky superstar", "walrus-shaped", and, by the park itself, as a "portly patriach of paunch".

After his death, Otis inspired a children's book, Otis Knows (How to Be a Bear) by Liz Garton Scanlon, released in 2026. The same year, a short film titled "Love Letters to Otis" was also released, about Otis' celebrity and the effect he had on viewers. It features art of Otis sent by fans to the park.

== Presumed death ==
Otis on land

After being spotted every summer from 2001 to 2023, Otis did not return to Brooks River in 2024 or 2025. Given his age, rangers suspected he had died, noting that it was possible but unlikely that he had chosen to summer elsewhere in Katmai. The average lifespan of a wild brown bear is 20-30 years, and 30 for captive speciments. Otis was considered one of the oldest bears at Brooks River.

== See also ==
- List of individual bears
