= Evan Johns =

- Born: July 12, 1956 Washington, DC, U.S.
- Died: March 11, 2017 (aged 60) Austin, Texas
- Genres: Rock, rockabilly
- Instrument(s): Guitar, vocal
- Years active: c.1974–2015

Evan Johns (July 12, 1956 – March 11, 2017) was an American guitarist and the originator of the term "redneck jazz."

== Early life ==
Johns was born in Washington, DC and raised in McLean, Virginia. His mother worked for the National Symphony Orchestra. Johns dropped out of high school in the 10th grade and eventually graduated from Emerson Preparatory School. He later began hitchhiking and train-hopping around the country.

== Career ==
Johns began his musical career in the Washington, D.C. area. There, Johns met and played with guitarist Danny Gatton, writing three songs (including the title track) for Gatton’s 1978 album, Redneck Jazz. After his stint with Gatton, Johns founded his own band, called "the H-Bombs", which became popular playing regular gigs in the D.C. area. Among the group's fans was Jello Biafra, founder of the Dead Kennedys and owner of Alternative Tentacles, who in liner notes to an H-Bombs EP, described the H-Bombs' music as "a little Tex-Mex here, garage power there, all whipped into a witch's brew of spitfire guitar and Evan's trademark vocal growl. This is the real stuff."

In 1984, Johns relocated to Austin, Texas, to join The LeRoi Brothers. In Austin, Johns performed on the 1985 compilation album, Trash, Twang and Thunder by several Austin guitarists who styled themselves as Big Guitars From Texas; the album earned a Grammy Award nomination for rock-instrumental music. The same year, Johns also contributed the original rockabilly song "Darlene Darlene" to The LeRoi Brothers' album "Lucky Lucky Me".

In 1985, after leaving The LeRois, Johns re-formed the H-Bombs in Austin and continued as its leader. Johns and the H-Bombs played together for several years thereafter, becoming known for their eclectic repertoire, summarized by one reviewer as "cajun, rockabilly, punk, surf, blues, country – even spaghetti Western soundtrack music." Rockit Fuel Only was released in 1991.

== Personal life ==
In the mid-1990s, Johns began to suffer alcohol-related health problems and stopped playing regularly in 1998, but continued to write and record music until his death.

Johns was married and divorced twice.

Johns died on March 11, 2017, from complications following surgery, in Austin, Texas.
