= George Barrell Emerson =

United States educator (1797–1881)

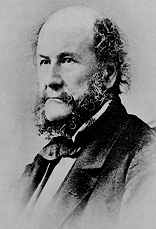
- Born: September 12, 1797
- Died: March 14, 1881
- Spouse(s): Olivia Buckminster (1st), Mary Rotch Flemming (2nd)

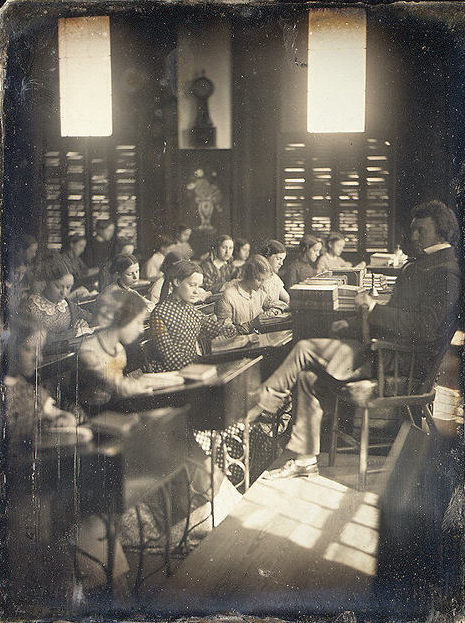
Emerson School for Girls, Boston, ca.1850; photo by Southworth & Hawes (Metropolitan Museum of Art, New York)

George Barrell Emerson (September 12, 1797 – March 14, 1881) was an American educator and pioneer of women's education.

== Biography ==
He was born in Kennebunk, Massachusetts (since 1820 in Maine). He graduated from Harvard College in 1817, and soon after took charge of an academy in Lancaster, Massachusetts. Between 1819 and 1821, he was the tutor in mathematics and natural philosophy at Harvard, and in 1821 was chosen principal of The English High School for Boys in Boston. In 1823 he opened the Emerson School for Girls in the same city, which he conducted until 1855, when he retired from professional life. He was one of the founders of the Boston Society of Natural History, which he became the president of. Later he was appointed by Governor Everett chairman of the commissioners for the zoological and botanical survey of Massachusetts. He died in Newton, Massachusetts.

== Family ==
He was a cousin of Ralph Waldo Emerson. He married his first wife, Olivia Buckminster on May 9, 1824. After her death on July 10, 1832, he married Mary Rotch Flemming on November 24, 1834.

== Legacy ==
- Emerson Preparatory School in Washington, D.C. was named in his honor.

== Externet Links ==
- Media related to George Barrell Emerson at Wikimedia Commons
