= Johanna Schmitt =

American ecologist

Johanna Schmitt is an evolutionary ecologist and plant geneticist. Her research is notable for its focus on the genetic basis of traits in ecologically valuable plants and on predicting how such plants will respond and adapt to environmental change such as climate warming. She has authored over 100 articles and her works have been cited over 7900 citations. She is honored with being the first female scientist at Brown University to be elected to the National Academy of Sciences.

== Life ==
Schmitt earned a B.A. with distinction in biology from Swarthmore College in 1974. Schmitt was awarded her Ph.D. in biology from Stanford University in 1981 where she studied with evolutionary biologist Ward Watt. After Stanford, Schmitt conducted research at Duke University. She joined Brown University in 1982 where she eventually became a Stephen T. Olney Professor of Natural History. At Brown, she was also the director of the Environmental Change Initiative. Currently, she is a University of California at Davis Distinguished Professor in the Department of Evolution and Ecology which she joined in 2012.

Schmitt is the recipient of a Humboldt Research Award, and is the past president of both the Society for the Study of Evolution (SSE) and the American Society of Naturalists (ASN). In addition, Schmitt is a fellow of the American Association for the Advancement of Science (AAAS) and a member of the National Academy of Sciences. She was inducted into the American Academy of Arts and Sciences in 2010.

== Research focus ==
Schmitt's research focuses on the mechanisms of adaptation and responses to climatic and environmental variations, the adaptive evolution of developmental plasticity (such as responses to seasonal cues), the ecology and evolution of maternal effects, the genetic and adaptive basis of developmental and physiological life-history traits and conservation biology of plants. An example of her research includes determining the roles of genetic and climatic variation in the model plant Arabidopsis. Schmitt's research is also on the forefront in using modeling to investigate how climate change will affect the distribution and success of plants.

== Selected publications ==
- Fournier-Level, A. Korte, M.D. Cooper, M. Nordborg, J. Schmitt and A.M. Wilczek. 2011. A map of local adaptation in Arabidopsis thaliana. Science 334: 86-89.
- Huang, X., J. Schmitt, L. Dorn, C. Griffith, S. Effgen, S. Takao, M. Koornneef, K. Donohue. 2010. The earliest stages of adaptation in an experimental plant population: strong selection on QTLs for seed dormancy. Molecular Ecology 19: 1335-1351
- Wilzcek, A.M., L.T. Burghardt, A.R. Cobb, M.D. Cooper, S.M.Welch, J. Schmitt. 2010 Genetic and physiological bases for phenological responses to current and predicted climates. Phil. Trans. Roy. Soc. B., 365:3129-3147.
- Wilczek, J. Roe, M. Knapp, M. Cooper, C.M. Lopez-Gallego, L. Martin, C. Muir, S. Sim, A. Walker, J. Anderson, J.F. Egan, B. Moyers, R. Petipas, A. Giakountis, E. Charbit, G. Coupland, S.M. Welch, and J. Schmitt. 2009. Effects of genetic perturbation on seasonal life history plasticity. Science, 323:930-934.
- Stinchcombe, J.R., C.Weinig, K.D. Heath, M.T. Brock, and J. Schmitt. 2009. Polymorphic genes of major effect: consequences for variation, selection, and evolution. Genetics 182: 911-922.
- Fournier-Level, A., A.M.Wilczek, M.D. Cooper, J.L. Roe, J. Anderson, D. Eaton, B.T. Moyers, R.H. Petipas, R.N.Schaeffer, B. Pieper, M.Reymond, M. Koornneef, S.M. Welch, D.L.Remington, and J. Schmitt. 2013. Paths to selection on life history loci in different natural environments across the native range of Arabidopsis thaliana. Molecular Ecology doi: 10.1111/mec.12285
