= How to Murder Your Life =

2017 memoir by Cat Marnell

- First edition (US)
- Author: Cat Marnell
- Audio read by: Cat Marnell
- Language: English
- Subject: Memoir
- Publisher: Simon & Schuster (US); Ebury Press (UK)
- Publication date: January 31, 2017
- Publication place: United States
- Media type: Print; digital
- Pages: 384
- ISBN: 978-1476752273

How to Murder Your Life is a memoir by fashion and beauty journalist Cat Marnell. It was released in 2017 by Simon & Schuster and became a bestseller.

The memoir deals with Marnell's childhood in a wealthy D.C. suburb, her introduction to drugs, her entry into the world of fashion journalism, and her continued struggles with addiction, which constantly threatened to torpedo her career.

== Summary ==
Marnell grows up in Washington, D.C. Her father is an abusive and controlling psychiatrist who eventually has her older sister sent to the Cross Creek Manor reform school, where her movements are severely restricted. To escape her father's rages, Marnell asks to attend boarding school and is sent to Lawrence Academy. After recreationally taking Ritalin, Marnell believes she has ADHD. Her father prescribes the drug to her and Marnell begins to use it both as a study aid and recreationally. In her final year of school, she discovers she is pregnant and delays having an abortion for so long that she enters her second trimester of pregnancy. After being accepted to Bard College in 2000, she harasses other accepted students online. This behavior leads to her expulsion from Lawrence, the rescission of her Bard acceptance, and the revelation of her pregnancy to her parents. Her mother takes her for an abortion, which Marnell finds traumatizing.

She gets into an acting class in New York City, but finds the workshops boring and is unable to make friends. Alone and isolated, she develops bulimia. While attending a show at the Comedy Cellar, she is picked up by Ardie Fuqua, who helps to introduce her to NYC nightlife. Marnell spends the next few years developing a drug habit, dropping in and out of colleges, and building contacts in the entertainment and fashion worlds.

At 21, she works in the closet at Vanity Fair. This gives her a taste for magazine journalism and she uses her connections to nab an internship at Nylon, where she works for beauty editor Charlotte Rudge. She subsequently gets internships at Teen Vogue and Glamour. After getting a free copy of Jean Godfrey-June's memoir, she becomes obsessed with the beauty editor and eventually lands a job as her assistant. Marnell works well with Godfrey-June and finds herself enjoying the perks of working at Lucky magazine. However, she begins to take more drugs after moving into an apartment infested with mice, which leads to further paranoia. She eventually contacts her parents to tell them she believes she is addicted to Adderall. They take her to a psychiatrist, who encourages Marnell to go to rehab. Marnell explains her addiction to Godfrey-June, who assures her she will have a job when she returns, and goes to the Silver Hill Hospital. Upon returning, Marnell is able to stay sober for a few months, before she begins to abuse alcohol and then returns to abusing Adderall. During the Great Recession, Marnell is officially promoted to Associate Beauty Editor. She immediately abuses her privileges but is protected from consequences by her intern, Godfrey-June, and the PR reps who are more interested in preserving their relationship with the magazine than in correcting her bad behavior.

Marnell becomes a roommate of Nev Schulman, which coincides with the worst time of her drug abuse. Her only friend, a fellow junkie named Marco, encourages her to do harder drugs and becomes increasingly abusive and threatening towards her, repeatedly breaking into her home and robbing her. Eventually, Marco destroys Schulman's apartment, causing Marnell to be evicted. In 2009, on her 27th birthday, Marnell realizes she has no friends and no one to spend the day with. Shortly after, she reconnects with Marco, who steals her keys and robs her entire apartment. Tracking his movements, she is able to successfully recover her things and also realizes he had been robbing her for years before she noticed. After having another breakdown, her father and Godfrey-June try to convince her to go to rehab a second time. Instead, Marnell goes to a mental institution, claiming to be suicidal. Her doctor at the mental institution eventually persuades her to go back to rehab, but Marnell leaves after nine days. She returns to drugs and to her job at Lucky magazine. However, she is no longer able to perform many of her job responsibilities and ultimately decides to quit, despite having the support of staff.

During her unemployment, Marnell attempts suicide. After being cut off from the rest of her family, she turns to her wealthy grandmother, Mimi, who pays off her debts and allows her to stay with her in Charlottesville, Virginia. Marnell eventually returns to New York and splits her time between there and Charlottesville. When Jane Pratt launches the online magazine xoJane in 2011, Marnell's friend Lesley Arfin encourages her to apply. Marnell is hired and works on articles regarding health, beauty, and drugs, finally able to write openly about her experiences as an addict.

While she disdains the online publication, her columns are nevertheless successful. After Whitney Houston dies in early 2012, Marnell writes about life as a woman who is a drug addict and the piece goes viral, leading her to negotiate a raise with xoJane. Shortly after, Marnell leaves the publication, in part due to her continued drug use. Nevertheless, in a series of interviews she gives about being a drug addict, her popularity rises. She is able to negotiate a well-paying job at Vice and obtain a literary agent, though it takes her until 2013 to piece together a coherent book proposal.

In an afterword, Marnell claims to be doing much better, saying she is much closer with her family, but also admits to still abusing drugs.

== Reception ==
Marnell's memoir was warmly received. The Globe and Mail praised her "chic-macabre sense of humour". Anne Helen Petersen, writing for The New York Times, praised her for keeping a balance "between glamorizing her own despair and rendering it with savage honesty."

The Irish Times, however, criticized the memoir, saying that Marnell was always playing the persona of Cat Marnell, and suggested "she can do much better".
