= Theo Colborn =

American biologist (1927–2014)

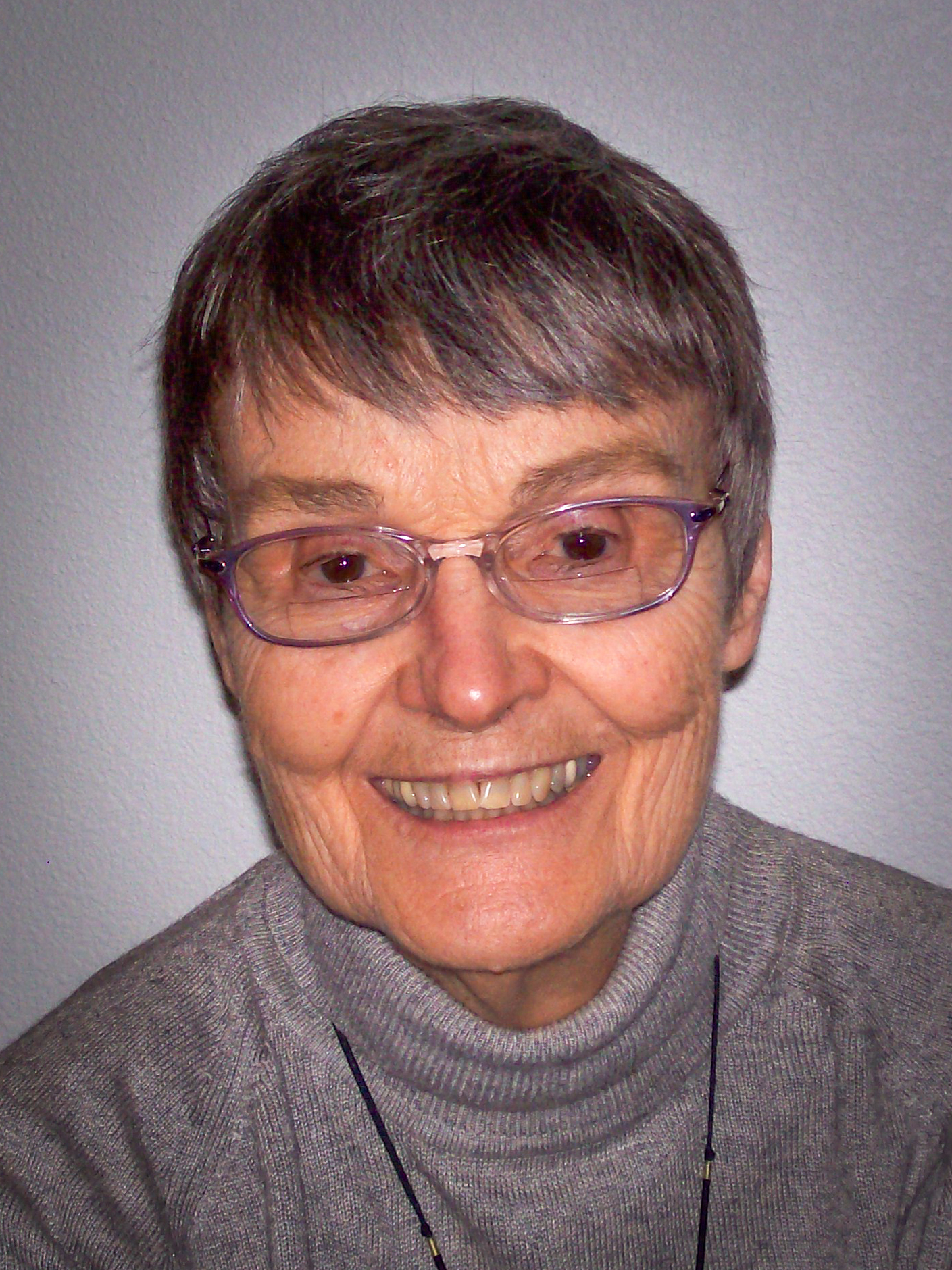
- Theo Colborn in 2010
- Born: Theodora Emily Decker; March 28, 1927; Plainfield, New Jersey, U.S.
- Died: December 14, 2014 (aged 87); Paonia, Colorado, U.S.
- Education: Rutgers University; Western State Colorado University; University of Wisconsin–Madison
- Known for: Pioneer in the field of endocrine disrupting chemicals
- Scientific career
- Fields: Zoology
- Workplaces: University of Florida

Theodora Emily Colborn (née Decker; March 28, 1927 – December 14, 2014) was Founder and President Emerita of The Endocrine Disruption Exchange (TEDX), based in Paonia, Colorado, and Professor Emerita of Zoology at the University of Florida, Gainesville. She was an environmental health analyst, and best known for her studies on the health effects of endocrine disrupting chemicals. She died in 2014.

== Academic career ==
In 1947, Colborn obtained a B.S. in Pharmacy from the College of Pharmacy at Rutgers University and became a pharmacist. In 1981, she graduated from Western State College of Colorado, Gunnison, with an M.A. in Science in freshwater ecology. In 1985, Colborn received a Fellowship from the Office of Technology Assessment, U.S. Congress. From there, in 1987, she joined the Conservation Foundation to provide scientific guidance for the 1990 book, Great Lakes, Great Legacy? in collaboration with the Institute for Research and Public Policy, Ottawa, Canada.

In 1985, at age 58 and as a grandmother, Colborn earned a PhD at the University of Wisconsin–Madison in Zoology (distributed minors in epidemiology, toxicology, and water chemistry). In 1993, she established and directed the Wildlife and Contaminants Program at World Wildlife Fund, US. She also held a chair for three years, starting in 1990, with the W. Alton Jones Foundation.

In 1991, as a fellow of the W. Alton Jones Foundation, she brought a group of 21 scientists with diverse backgrounds together, to attend the first of a series of conferences at Racine, Wisconsin, that became known simply as "Wingspread", about the effects of human exposure to hormone-disrupting chemicals examined in the environment. In 1993, she was given a three-year Pew Fellows Award.

Colborn served on numerous advisory panels, including the U.S. Environmental Protection Agency Science Advisory Board, the Ecosystem Health Committee of the International Joint Commission of the United States and Canada, the Science Management Committee of the Toxic Substances Research Initiative of Canada, the U.S. EPA Endocrine Disruptor Screening and Testing Advisory Committee, and the EPA Endocrine Disruption Methods and Validation Subcommittee. She published and lectured extensively on the consequences of prenatal exposure to synthetic chemicals by the developing embryo and fetus in wildlife, laboratory animals, and humans.

In 2003, at age 76, she founded a non-profit, The Endocrine Disruption Exchange (TEDX), a research organization devoted to understanding how environmental exposures to endocrine disruptors interfere with development and health, for academicians, policy makers, government employees, community-based and health support groups, public health authorities, physicians, the media, and individuals.

In 2005, she first talked about public health issues regarding gas development. Two years later she testified in the US House Committee on Oversight and Government Reform about "the need for full disclosure of chemicals used to produce and deliver natural gas". She continued to work on this topic until her last year of life, when she published a study on air quality near natural gas operations and developed a continuing medical education course titled "Natural Gas Operations, Air Emission Exposure, and Recommendations to the Healthcare Community."

== Endocrine disruption ==
Colborn's 1988 research on the state of the environment of the Great Lakes revealed that apex predator female birds, fish, mammals, and reptiles transferred persistent, man-made chemicals to their offspring, which undermined the development and programming of their youngsters' organs before they were born or hatched. In 1991, in light of this evidence, Colborn convened 21 international scientists from 15 different disciplines to share their research relevant to transgenerational health impacts. The Wingspread statement contains participant and specialty information. During that meeting, the term “endocrine disruption” was coined.

In 1992 a book followed entitled Chemically Induced Alterations in Sexual and Functional Development: The Wildlife/Human Connection, which is a collection of technical manuscripts by those who attended the session. The information from this volume and numerous subsequent scientific publications on the result of low-dose and/or ambient exposure effects of endocrine disruptors was popularized in her 1996 book, Our Stolen Future, co-authored with Dianne Dumanoski and John Peterson Myers published in 18 languages. Colborn's work has prompted the enactment of new laws around the world and redirected the research of academicians, governments, and the private sector.

== Awards and honors ==
Colborn received many awards and honors for her work, including: The Jonathan Foreman Award, American Academy of Environmental Medicine, October 2014; The Jean and Leslie Douglas Pearl Award, December 2013; Twenty-Seventh International Neurotoxicology Conference, Theo Colborn Award, November 2011; Honorary Doctor of Science Degree, University of Colorado Boulder, May 2011; French National Museum of Natural History, Medal, April 2011; The Swedish Goteborg Prize for the Environment and Sustainability, November 2008; TIME Global Environmental Heroes Award, October 2007; National Council on Science and the Environment, Lifetime Achievement Award, February 2007; University of California San Francisco Medical School/Collaborative for Health and the Environment 2007 Summit Award: A Woman on the Forefront: Leadership and Integrity in Science, January 2007; Beyond Pesticides, 2006 Dragonfly Award, April 2006; The Center for Science in the Public Interest, Rachel Carson Award, May 2004; Society of Toxicology and Environmental Chemistry, Rachel Carson Award, November 2003; International Blue Planet Prize, Asahi Glass Foundation, Japan, October 2000; Norwegian International Rachel Carson Prize, June 1999; Audubon Magazine: A Century of Conservation, 100 Champions of Conservation, 1998; State of the World Forum, Mikhail Gorbachev, “Change Makers Award,” November 1997; Rachel Carson Leadership Award, Chatham College, June 1997; United Nations Environment Programme (UNEP), Women Leadership in the Environment Award, March 1997; National Conservation Achievement Award in Science, National Wildlife Federation, 1994; Pew Scholars Award in Environment and Conservation, June 1993 – 1996; W. Alton Jones Foundation, Fellowship, June 1990 – 1993; The National Water Alliance Award for Excellence in Protecting the Nation's Aquatic Resources, June 1991; US Congressional Fellowship, Office of Technology Assessment, 1985.

== Private life ==
Colborn was married and had four children. She and her husband owned pharmacies in New Jersey. In 1964, they moved to a farm in western Colorado, eventually raising sheep. She became interested in environmental health. After her marriage dissolved in the 1970s she started doing field work for the Rocky Mountain Biological Laboratory examining water for toxicants released by mining activity.

She developed lung disease and was oxygen dependent at age 87. For much of her life, Dr Colborn suffered from undiagnosed coeliac disease; after years of distress, it was finally identified in the 1980s (she was then in her late fifties) and she eliminated rice and potato from her diet, with immediate relief.

== Selected works ==
- Colborn, Theodora E. (1990). Great Lakes, Great Legacy?. Institute for Research and Public Policy. pp. 301 p. ISBN 978-0891641155.
- Colborn, Theo; Dumanoski, Dianne; Myers, John Peterson (1996). Our Stolen Future: Are We Threatening Our Fertility, Intelligence, and Survival? A Scientific Detective Story. Dutton. ISBN 978-0-525-93982-5. "our stolen future."
- Colborn, Theo (2004). "Neurodevelopment and endocrine disruption". Environmental Health Perspectives. 112 (9): 944–949. Bibcode:2004EnvHP.112..944C. doi:10.1289/ehp.6601. JSTOR 3838094. PMC 1247186. PMID 15198913.
- Colborn, Theo; et al. (2011). "Natural Gas Operations from a Public Health Perspective". Human and Ecological Risk Assessment. 17 (5): 1039–1056. Bibcode:2011HERA...17.1039C. doi:10.1080/10807039.2011.605662. S2CID 53996198.
- Colborn, Theo; et al. (2014). "An Exploratory Study of Air Quality Near Natural Gas Operations". Human and Ecological Risk Assessment. 20 (1): 86–105. Bibcode:2014HERA...20...86C. doi:10.1080/10807039.2012.749447. S2CID 86483539.

== Bibliography ==
- Musil, Robert K. (2014). Rachel Carson and Her Sisters: Extraordinary Women Who Have Shaped America's Environment. Rutgers University Press. pp. Chapter 7. ISBN 978-0813562421.
- Krimsky, Sheldon (2002). Hormonal Chaos: The Scientific and Social Origins of the Environmental Endocrine Hypothesis. Johns Hopkins University Press. ISBN 9780801872525.
