= Cat Marnell =

American writer

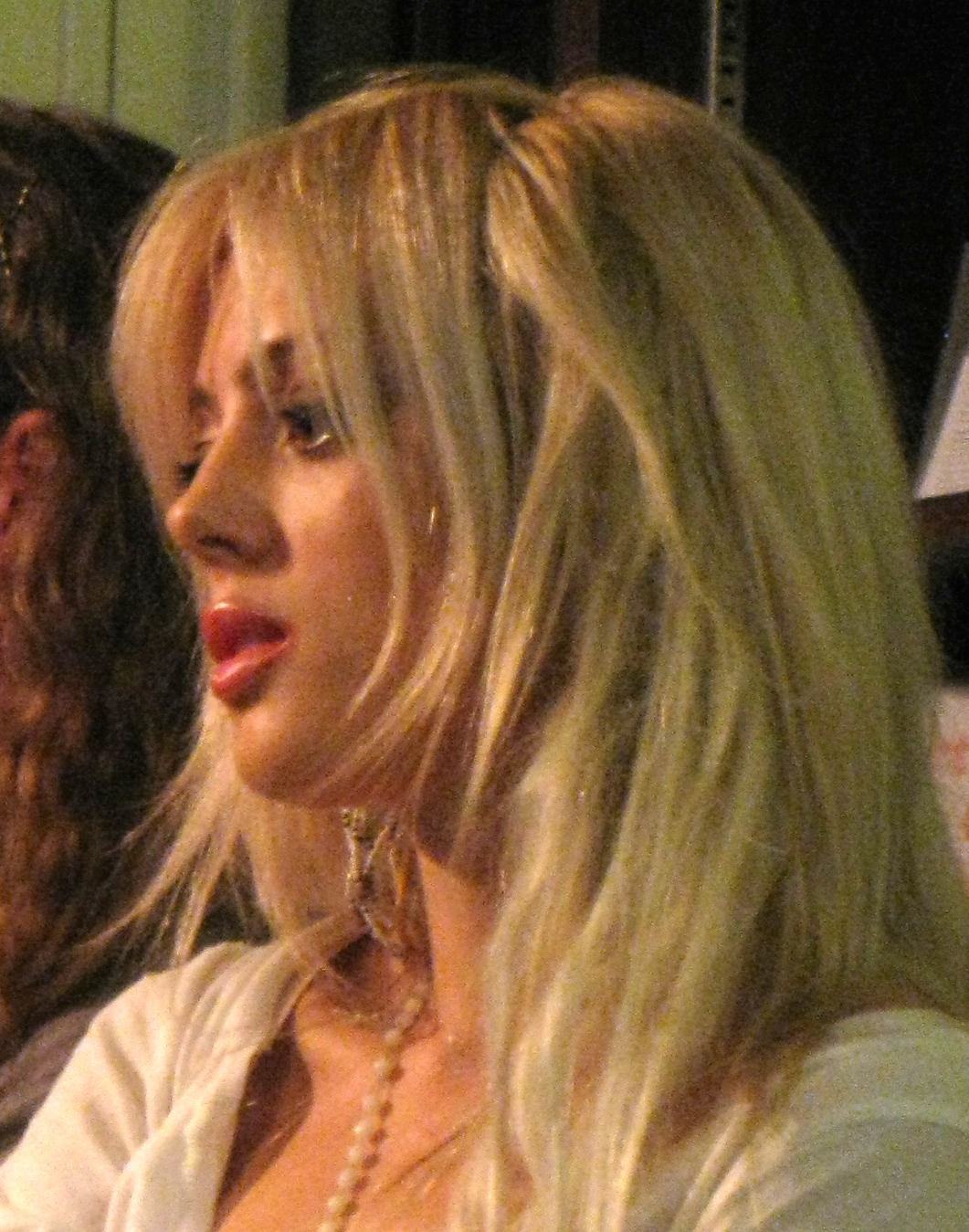
- Marnell at Housing Works Bookstore Café in New York City, October 2012
- Born: September 10, 1982 (age 44); Washington, D.C., U.S.
- Education: The New School (BA)
- Occupation: Writer

Caitlin Elizabeth Marnell (born September 10, 1982) is an American writer based in New York City. She was a beauty editor at Lucky and XoJane, wrote a column for Vice, and has also written for Self, Nylon, and Glamour. She is the author of the New York Times bestselling memoir How to Murder Your Life, which was published in 2017. Her first novel, The Bored and the Beautiful, will be published in February 2027.

== Early life and education ==
Marnell was born on September 10, 1982, in Washington, D.C. She was named after Caitlin Thomas. Her mother is a licensed clinical social worker and her father is a psychiatrist. At 15, Marnell began attending Lawrence Academy in Groton, Massachusetts. She was a strong student academically, but at 17 was expelled weeks before graduation. She finished high school at Emerson Preparatory School in Northwest Washington, D.C.

She then attended The New School in Greenwich Village, where she studied nonfiction writing.

== Career ==
=== Lucky ===
While attending The New School, Marnell interned at beauty magazines, eventually earning the title of beauty assistant at Lucky in 2007. She attended rehab in Connecticut for a month, and when she returned she was promoted to associate beauty editor. She worked at Lucky for two and a half years before quitting after failed attempts at sobriety. After overdosing on Xanax and Ambien in her apartment and spending two weeks at Bellevue in 2011, she said she "vowed never, ever to lie to a job again: they could take me or leave me with my drug stuff."

=== XoJane ===
Shortly after being released, she was hired by Jane Pratt to become beauty and health director of XoJane. Her writing was "shrouded in irreverent yet deeply personal anecdotes" with frequent references to her drug use, hospitalizations, and mental illnesses. She first received widespread attention when she wrote about using emergency contraception as her primary birth control, which spread through Twitter. Her position was controversial – Anna David at The Fix wrote that Marnell "wins applause for her bravery" in speaking openly about drug use, while Hamilton Nolan at Gawker described her as a "dust-smoking suicidal narcissist downtown swinger beauty columnist".

=== Vice ===
Just days after her open letter, Marnell was hired by Vice for a column called "Amphetamine Logic". Described as darker than her previous work, it focused around Marnell's drug use and day-to-day life. In November, she went to rehab in Thailand on assignment for Vice but did not write anything. When she returned, she began taking drugs again and wrote final goodbye columns for Vice in September 2012 and January 2013. Altogether, she wrote 11 articles in the series.

=== How to Murder Your Life ===
Marnell's memoir, How to Murder Your Life, was released in 2017 and became a New York Times bestseller. The book reflects on her battle between ambition and addiction.

Penelope Green wrote for The New York Times that the book was "as compelling — and as problematic — as [Marnell's] magazine writing: vivid, maddening, heartbreaking, very funny, chaotic and repetitive, as benders are".

=== The Bored and the Beautiful ===
Her first novel, The Bored and the Beautiful, will be published in February 2027.

== Audiobook ==
In October 2019 Marnell released Self-Tanner for the Soul with Audible, recounting her European escapades with XL Airways UK.

== See also ==
- Team Facelift
- Lucky (magazine)
- Nimrod Kamer
