= Hyperphagia (ecology) =

Aspect of behavioral ecology

In behavioral ecology, hyperphagia is a short-term increase in food intake and metabolization in response to changing environmental conditions. It is most prominent in a number of migratory bird species. Hyperphagia occurs when fat deposits need to be built up over the course of a few days or weeks, for example in wintering birds that are preparing to start on their spring migration, or when feeding habitat conditions improve for only a short duration.

== In preparation for hibernation ==
=== Bears ===
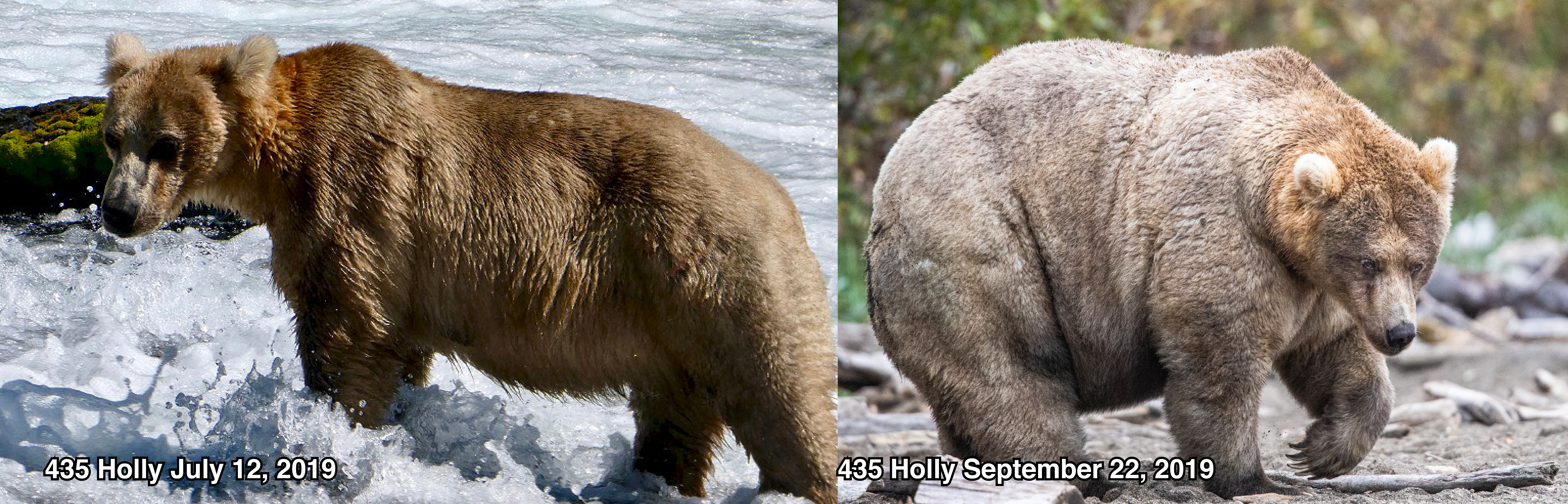
A brown bear in Katmai national park, seen in July and in September.

Brown bears can double their weight from spring to autumn, gaining up to 180 kg (400 lb) of fat. These deposits are used to survive their winter hibernation. During summer and autumn, brown bears have been observed consuming large amounts of insects, roots and bulbs, salmon, and other food sources depending on their location and the availability of food.

During the autumn months, American brown bears consume a large amount of hard masts and berries. Bears living near human settlements may break into buildings or vehicles to eat any food left inside. In some rare cases, the amount of food available from human activity is enough to disrupt regular hibernation behaviour.

=== Squirrels ===
Ground squirrels prepare for hibernation by a period of hyperphagia. This has been noted in the golden-mantled ground squirrel and the Arctic ground squirrel.

== In migratory birds ==
Mallards may engage in hyperphagia in response to winter floods that temporarily make available more wetlands for foraging, heavily increasing their daily food intake to make use of the additional food.
