= Our Stolen Future =

1996 book by Theo Colborn, Dianne Dumanoski and John Peterson Myers

Our Stolen Future: Are We Threatening Our Fertility, Intelligence, and Survival? A Scientific Detective Story
- Author: Theo Colborn; Dianne Dumanoski; John Peterson Myers
- Language: English
- Subject: Endocrine disruptors, public health
- Publisher: Dutton
- Publication date: 1996
- Publication place: United States
- Pages: 306
- ISBN: 978-0-525-93982-5
- OCLC: 33246122
- LC Class: RA1224.2.C65

Our Stolen Future: Are We Threatening Our Fertility, Intelligence, and Survival? A Scientific Detective Story is a 1996 book by Theo Colborn, Dianne Dumanoski, and John Peterson Myers. The book chronicles the development of the endocrine disruptor hypothesis by Colborn. Though written for the popular press in narrative form, the book contains a substantial amount of scientific evidence. A foreword from then Vice President Al Gore increased the book's visibility. It ultimately influenced government policy through congressional hearings and helped foster the development of a research and regulation initiative within the United States Environmental Protection Agency (EPA).

The authors also started a website which continues to monitor and report on endocrine disruptor scientific research.

Thousands of scientific articles have since been published on endocrine disruption, demonstrating the availability of grant money for research on the hypothesis raised by Our Stolen Future. For example, a symposium at the 2007 American Association for the Advancement of Science (AAAS) meeting explored the contribution of endocrine disruption to obesity and metabolic disorder. As is often the case, there is strong animal evidence but few epidemiological tests of predictions based on the animal experiments.

A 2006 analysis of Centers for Disease Control (CDC) data found an extraordinary increase in risk to type II diabetes as a function of exposure to persistent organic pollutants (POPs), in particular synthetic organic chemicals such as organohalogens.

== See also ==
- Silent Spring
