= Charles Lee Remington =

American entomologist

- Born: January 19, 1922; Reedville, Virginia
- Died: May 31, 2007 (aged 85); Hamden, Connecticut
- Occupation: Scientist
- Spouse: Ellen Mahoney
- Parent(s): Maud Skoglund Remington; Pardon Sheldon Remington

Charles Lee Remington (January 19, 1922 – May 31, 2007) was an American entomologist known for studies of butterflies and moths, a Yale University professor, and is considered the father of modern lepidoptery. He established a Periodical Cicada preserve in Hamden, Connecticut. He developed the insect collection at the Peabody Museum of Natural History. Among species named in his honor are Agathymus remingtoni (the Coahuila giant skipper) and Metajapyx remingtoni, a forcepstail.

== Biography ==
Remington was born to Pardon Sheldon and Maud Remington in Reedville, Virginia, on January 19, 1922. His family then moved to St. Louis, Missouri. He grew up collecting butterflies with his father. He did his undergraduate studies at Principia College, where he received a B.S. in 1943. During his military service in World War II, he served as a medical entomologist, throughout the Pacific, researching insect-borne diseases and centipede bites in the Philippines.

After the war, Remington studied for his doctorate at Harvard. He founded the Lepidopterists' Society with Harry Clench and his first wife Jeanne Remington, mother of his three children. Remington also started a friendship with Vladimir Nabokov who was a keen amateur butterfly collector.

He started teaching at Yale University in 1948. In 1956 he started a correspondence with amateur lepidopterist and high school student Ward Watt, who went on to study at Yale and eventually receive his PhD with Remington. For the academic year 1958–59, Remington was a Guggenheim fellow at Oxford University. In the 1960s he proposed that there were geographic regions which he called suture zones where species tended to hybridize with close relatives.

With Richard Bowers and Paul R. Ehrlich he founded Zero Population Growth. He served on the board of advisors of the Carrying Capacity Network, an organization that supports immigration reduction.

He died on May 31, 2007, at age 85, in Hamden, Connecticut.
