= Labour Day (album) =

Studio album by Spirit of the West
- Released: January 2, 1988
- Recorded: 1988
- Genre: Folk
- Length: 40:32
- Label: Stony Plain Records
- Producer: Spirit of the West with Danny Greenspoon

Spirit of the West chronology
Tripping Up the Stairs (1986)	Labour Day (1988)	Old Material 1984-1986 (1989)

Professional ratings
Review scores
Source	Rating
Allmusic	4.5/5 stars

Labour Day is a 1988 album by Spirit of the West.

The album's best-known song is "Political", which was the first song to gain widespread airplay for the band on campus radio and CBC Radio One. When the band evolved into an alternative rock group in the 1990s, their 1991 album Go Figure included a controversial revamp of that song.

It was the band's first album with Hugh McMillan. McMillan found the tour to support the album draining, and took a temporary hiatus from the band; he was replaced by Daniel Lapp and Linda McRae. However, McMillan returned before the band's next album. Lapp left on McMillan's return, but McRae stayed with the band until 1996.

It was also the band's first album to reach the RPM Top 100 albums chart, peaking at #64, and was a nominee for Best Roots & Traditional Album at the Juno Awards of 1989.

== Track listing ==
Lyrics and music are credited to various combinations of the band members: John Mann, Geoffrey Kelly and Hugh McMillan. Arrangements are credited to the band. Former band member J. Knutson also receives an arranging credit on "Drinking Man". As with all of the band's early folk albums, several songs are arranged around traditional Irish and Scottish reels and jigs.

1. "Darkhouse" ( – 4:46 - Jig: "The Connaughtman's Rambles")
2. "Political" – 4:27
3. "Profiteers" – 3:03
4. "The Hounds that Wait Outside Your Door" – 5:20
5. "Runboy" ( – 4:10 - Reel: "The Banshee")
6. "Drinking Man" ( – 5:53 - Reel: "The Hunter's Purse")
7. "Expensive/Cinema of Pain" – 3:26
8. "Gottingen Street" – 4:11
9. "Take it From the Source" – 5:39
