= Hit Parade (Spirit of the West album) =

Greatest hits album by Spirit of the West
- Released: September 14, 1999
- Recorded: 1988–1997
- Genre: Folk-Rock
- Length: 43:56
- Label: Warner Music Canada
- Producer: Spirit of the West, Joe Chiccarelli, Ken Marshall, Michael Phillip Wojewoda, Danny Greenspoon

Spirit of the West chronology
Weights and Measures (1997)	Hit Parade (1999)	Star Trails (2004)

Professional ratings
Review scores
Source	Rating
Allmusic	4/5 stars

Hit Parade is the second compilation album by Canadian folk rock group Spirit of the West, released on September 14, 1999 by Warner Music Canada.

The album is a compilation, and marked their final release for Warner Music Canada. Despite the album's title, not all of the songs on the album were released as singles, and some songs which were notable singles ("Tell Me What I Think", "Slow Learner") are not present. The songs are presented roughly in reverse chronological order, except for "And if Venice is Sinking". That song appears on the album alongside songs from 1990's Save This House, but was originally released on 1993's Faithlift.

As with most of the band's live shows during this era, the studio portion of the album opens with "Canadian Skye" (from 1997's Weights and Measures) and closes with the band's most famous song, "Home for a Rest" (from Save This House).

At the end of the album, four songs appear which were recorded with the Vancouver Symphony Orchestra during the sessions for the album Open Heart Symphony. Those sessions included new songs and performances of several of the band's past hits, but only the new songs appeared on the original album.

The performances which appear on Hit Parade collect the hits portion of those shows, along with a rendition of "That's Amore" sung by Vince Ditrich. The band had long maintained a tradition of having Ditrich, the band's drummer, croon an old pop song — usually "That's Amore", but occasionally "I Don't Want to Set the World on Fire" — at some point during its live shows, but the rendition appearing here is Ditrich's only lead vocal performance on a Spirit of the West album.

Following this release, the band went on hiatus for several years, returning in 2004 with Star Trails.

== Track listing ==
All songs by John Mann and Geoffrey Kelly, except where noted.

1. "Canadian Skye"
2. "Rites of Man"
3. "Wishing Line"
4. "Unplugged"
5. "Williamson's Garage"
6. "Sadness Grows"
7. "5 Free Minutes"
8. "Bone of Contention"
9. "D For Democracy (Scour the House)"
10. "Goodbye Grace"
11. "Puttin' Up With the Joneses"
12. "And if Venice is Sinking"
13. "Save This House"
14. "Home for a Rest"
15. "Political" *
16. "That's Amore" (written by Harry Warren and Jack Brooks) *
17. "And if Venice is Sinking" *
18. "The Crawl" *

* These four songs are drawn from the Vancouver Symphony Orchestra sessions.
