= Tripping Up the Stairs =

Studio album by Spirit of the West
- Released: July 1986
- Recorded: 1985–1986
- Genre: Folk
- Length: 39:20
- Label: Stony Plain Records
- Producer: Paul Hyde

Spirit of the West chronology
| Spirit of the West (1984) | Tripping Up the Stairs (1986) | Labour Day (1988) |

Professional ratings
Review scores
| Source | Rating |
|---|---|
| Allmusic | 4.5/5 stars |

Tripping Up the Stairs is the second studio album by Canadian folk rock group Spirit of the West, released in July 1986 by Stony Plain Records.

"The Crawl" is an enduring fan favourite at the band's concerts.

J. Knutson left the band after this album. He was replaced by Hugh McMillan.

The band recorded at least one other song with producer Paul Hyde, "Think About It", which has never appeared on any album or single. However, a live performance video of the song aired in occasional rotation on MuchMusic throughout the decade and into the 1990s.

== Track listing ==
Lyrics and music are credited to the band members: John Mann, Geoffrey Kelly and J. Knutson. As with all of the band's early folk albums, several songs are arranged around traditional Irish and Scottish jigs and reels.

1. "An Honest Gamble" – 4:32 (Jig: "Tripping Up the Stairs")
2. "Our Station" – 3:34
3. "Peacetime" – 4:10
4. "Room Without a View (Stella)" – 4:00
5. "The Crawl" – 4:00
6. "Homelands" – 3:57 (Jigs: "The Kesh", "The Blackthorn Stick")
7. "The Mists of Crofton" – 3:00
8. "Till the Cows Come Home" – 2:56
9. "When Rivers Rise" – 3:56
10. "Be Right" – 5:15 (Reel: "Pigeon on the Gate")

== Personnel ==
Musicians

- Jack Duncan – congas
- Geoff Kelly – Bodhrán, flute, vocals
- J. Knutson – bass, bouzouki, guitar, mandolin, vocals
- Anne Leader – keyboards
- John Mann – guitar, vocals
- Barry Muir – fretless bass

Other credits

- Deb Dacombe – photography
- Paul Hyde – producer
- Tom Obburn – design, illustrations
- Ron Obvious – engineer, mixing
