= Old Material 1984–1986 =

Compilation album by Spirit of the West
- Released: November 1989
- Recorded: 1984–1986
- Genre: Folk
- Length: 40:14
- Label: Stony Plain Records
- Producer: Spirit of the West with Barney Bentall and Ron Obvious

Spirit of the West chronology
Labour Day (1988)	Old Material 1984–1986 (1989)	Save This House (1990)

Old Material 1984–1986 is the first compilation album by Canadian folk rock group Spirit of the West, released in November 1989 by Stony Plain Records.

It was the band's final release for Stony Plain Records. Side one of the album includes five tracks from their out-of-print 1984 album Spirit of the West, and side two presents a 1986 live performance from the Vancouver East Cultural Centre.

The live performance showcases a band already quite skilled at the crowd-pleasing sense of showmanship that would become their trademark, especially when John Mann flubs the beginning of "General Guinness" from laughing too hard at the clownish antics of bandmates J. Knutson and Geoffrey Kelly.

== Track listing ==
All songs by Mann, Kelly and Knutson, except where otherwise noted.

1. "Rocks at Thieves' Bay" – 4:53
2. "To a Highlander Unknown" – 4:16
3. "Doin' Quite Alright" – 4:40
4. "Down on the Dole" – 5:08
5. "John Goodman" – 3:48
6. "Aberdeen" – 4:07
7. "Ships in Full Sail" – 3:05 - music by Mann/Kelly/Knutson, lyrics by Mann's father (name currently unknown)
8. "Be Right" – 5:58
9. "Time to Ring Some Changes" – 4:19, written by Richard Thompson
10. "General Guinness" – 3:46, traditional
