= Daniel Lapp =

Canadian musician

- Born: Prince George, British Columbia, Canada
- Genres: Jazz, folk rock
- Occupations: Musician, educator
- Instruments: Fiddle, trumpet, singing
- Labels: Diversity, Woodbox
- Member of: B.C. Fiddle Orchestra, Daniel Lapp Quartet, Daniel Lapp Fiddleharmonic, Lappelectro
- Formerly of: Spirit of the West
- Awards: Queen's Diamond Jubilee Medal (2012); Canadian Folk Music Innovator Award (2013); CGMFA Lifetime Achievement Award (2019)
- Website: daniellapp.com

Daniel Edward Lapp is a Canadian folk musician based in Victoria, British Columbia and Pender Island.

== Early life ==
Lapp was born and grew up in Prince George, British Columbia. His mother, Charlotte Lapp, was a pianist. He learned to play the violin from his grandfather, beginning at age nine. He studied trumpet with Lou Ranger at the University of Victoria, and attended Humber College in Toronto in 1985. His old time musical environment included five uncles who played fiddle and numerous accordion playing aunts, which was a natural place for immersion into this musical genre.

== Educator ==
Lapp became a fiddle teacher, and in 1994, he formed the B.C. Fiddle Orchestra, which showcased a dozen young fiddlers from around British Columbia and a full backup band. The ensemble's debut was in front of about 60,000 people at the Commonwealth Games in Victoria. The group continued to perform in British Columbia, and by 2013 had released an album. In 2014, Daniel was appointed as the inaugural Artistic Director of the Victoria Conservatory of Music's Chwyl Family School of Contemporary Music, where he now under the umbrella of the Victoria Conservatory of Music, continues to direct the B.C. Fiddle Orchestra, the "Joy of Life" Choir, and "Folkestra", teaches fiddle and trumpet privately, and is Artistic Director of the Contemporary Music component to the Victoria Conservatory of Music's Postsecondary Diploma in Music Performance.

== Archivist ==
Beginning in 1990, with the assistance of a grant from the Canada Council on the Arts, Daniel Lapp travelled throughout British Columbia and collected over 1,000 fiddle tunes. According to Lapp, these tunes were heavily influenced by music from the Grand Ole Opry in Nashville, and famous Canadian fiddlers such as Don Messer, Al Cherny, Ned Landry, Frankie Rodgers, Ward Allen, Graham Townsend, and fiddlers from the Canadian Prairies such as King Ganam and Andy DeJarlis.

== Performance career ==
Lapp was a touring member of the folk rock band Spirit of the West in 1988 and 1989, but never appeared on any of the band's albums. Lapp and Linda McRae replaced Hugh McMillan during MacMillan's hiatus from the band following the 1988 album Labour Day. Lapp left when MacMillan returned before the band's next album. He has also toured with Barney Bentall, Mae Moore and Rickie Lee Jones.

As a fiddler, jazz trumpeter and singer/songwriter, Daniel Lapp has played on over 100 albums and performed across Canada, the United States, Ireland, England, Scotland, Wales, Finland and Germany with many renowned Folk and Jazz musicians. Daniel is the winner of the B.C. Fiddle Championship and has appeared as a soloist with the CBC Chamber Orchestra as well as the Prince George, Victoria, and Vancouver Symphonies.

In 2010, Daniel Lapp performed as part of "Rhythms of the Fall," a segment that was performed for a live audience of more than 60,000 in B.C. Place Stadium for the 2010 Winter Olympic Games opening ceremonies in Vancouver, as well as the millions watching on television internationally. He, along with Canadian fiddlers Ashley MacIsaac (Cape Breton), April Verch (Ontario), Samantha Robichaud (New Brunswick), Andre Brunet (Quebec), and Sierra Noble (Manitoba) represented different Canadian regions on stage to perform the fiddle style of their region. They were joined by Alberta fiddler Calvin Vollrath, who composed most of the tunes for this twelve minute set and played with the orchestra.

Lapp has since released a number of albums featuring an experimental brand of folk fused with jazz and electronic influences. He continued to give lessons privately, as well as holding international festival workshops. He later founded the "House of Music" in Victoria, British Columbia.

His trio with English accordionist Martin Green and Canadian guitarist Adam Dobres has become a regular performer at Glasgow's Celtic Connections Festival and Cape Breton's Celtic Colours. He played on John Wort Hannam's 2015 album Love Lives On, played with Susannah Adams at the Hornby Island Music Festival in 2017, and in 2018 performed with 54-40 both locally and at Ottawa's CityFolk Festival.

In 2012, Daniel Lapp received the Queen's Diamond Jubilee "Service" Award. In 2013, he was the recipient of the Canadian Folk Music Association "Innovator" Award for his contribution to Canada's fiddle culture. Besides teaching, this includes a 25 year commitment to collecting indigenous British Columbia fiddle tunes, which includes over 1000 compositions by over 100 British Columbia composers.

In 2019, the Canadian Grand Masters Fiddling Association honoured Daniel Lapp with the Lifetime Achievement Award when the competition was held in Abbotsford, British Columbia. Lapp received this award for the creation of the B.C. Fiddle Tune Archive, as well as his accomplishments in education, performance and recording.

== Discography ==
- Daniel Lapp (1994)
- Merry Chetmas: A Tribute to Chet Baker (year unknown, as Daniel Lapp Quartet)
- Live and Kickin' (1996, as Daniel Lapp Fiddleharmonic)
- Reunion (2002, as Daniel Lapp and Friends)
- Closer Than They Appear (2002, as Lappelectro)
- Live at Seattle WOMAD, 07/01 (2002, as Lappelectro)
- Fishcakes and Oranges (2013 as Daniel Lapp and the BC Fiddle Orchestra)
