= Spirituality 1983–2008: The Consummate Compendium =

Compilation album by Spirit of the West
- Released: July 15, 2008
- Recorded: 1983–2008
- Genre: Folk rock
- Label: Rhino Records
- Producer: various

Spirit of the West chronology
Star Trails (2004)	Spirituality 1983–2008: The Consummate Compendium (2008)

Spirituality 1983–2008: The Consummate Compendium is a greatest hits album by Spirit of the West, released by Rhino Records on July 15, 2008.

The album was compiled as a 25th anniversary retrospective of the band's career, and features 32 tracks over two discs. The tracks include two new songs, "Another Happy New Year" and "Winter's Now the Enemy", as well as an unreleased demo version of the band's song "Kiss & Tell". The album also includes the band's rendition of Donovan's "Sunshine Superman", which was released on the 1992 Donovan tribute album Island of Circles but has never previously appeared on any of the band's own albums.

The CD is packaged in a book-style digipak which includes rare photos, set lists, handwritten lyrics and other items from the group's archives.

Concurrently with the album's release, Rhino also reissued two of the band's most successful albums, Faithlift and Open Heart Symphony.

== Track listing ==
=== Disc one ===
1. "Doin' Quite Alright"
2. "Homelands"
3. "The Crawl"
4. "Political"
5. "Take It from the Source"
6. "Puttin' Up with the Joneses"
7. "The Old Sod"
8. "Not Just a Train"
9. "Save This House"
10. "Home for a Rest"
11. "Goodbye Grace"
12. "Pulling Lame"
13. "D for Democracy (Scour the House)"
14. "Big Head"
15. "Far Too Canadian"
16. "Kiss & Tell" (demo)

=== Disc two ===
1. "And if Venice Is Sinking"
2. "Sadness Grows"
3. "Bone of Contention"
4. "Death on the Beach"
5. "Is This Where I Come In?"
6. "Unplugged"
7. "Wishing Line"
8. "Our Ambassador"
9. "Rites of Man"
10. "Heavenly Angel"
11. "Canadian Skye"
12. "Waiting for Martin"
13. "July"
14. "Sunshine Superman"
15. "Winter's Now the Enemy"
16. "Another Happy New Year"
