= Kwame Nkrumah-Acheampong =

Ghanaian skier (born 1974)

Kwame "The Snow Leopard" Nkrumah-Acheampong
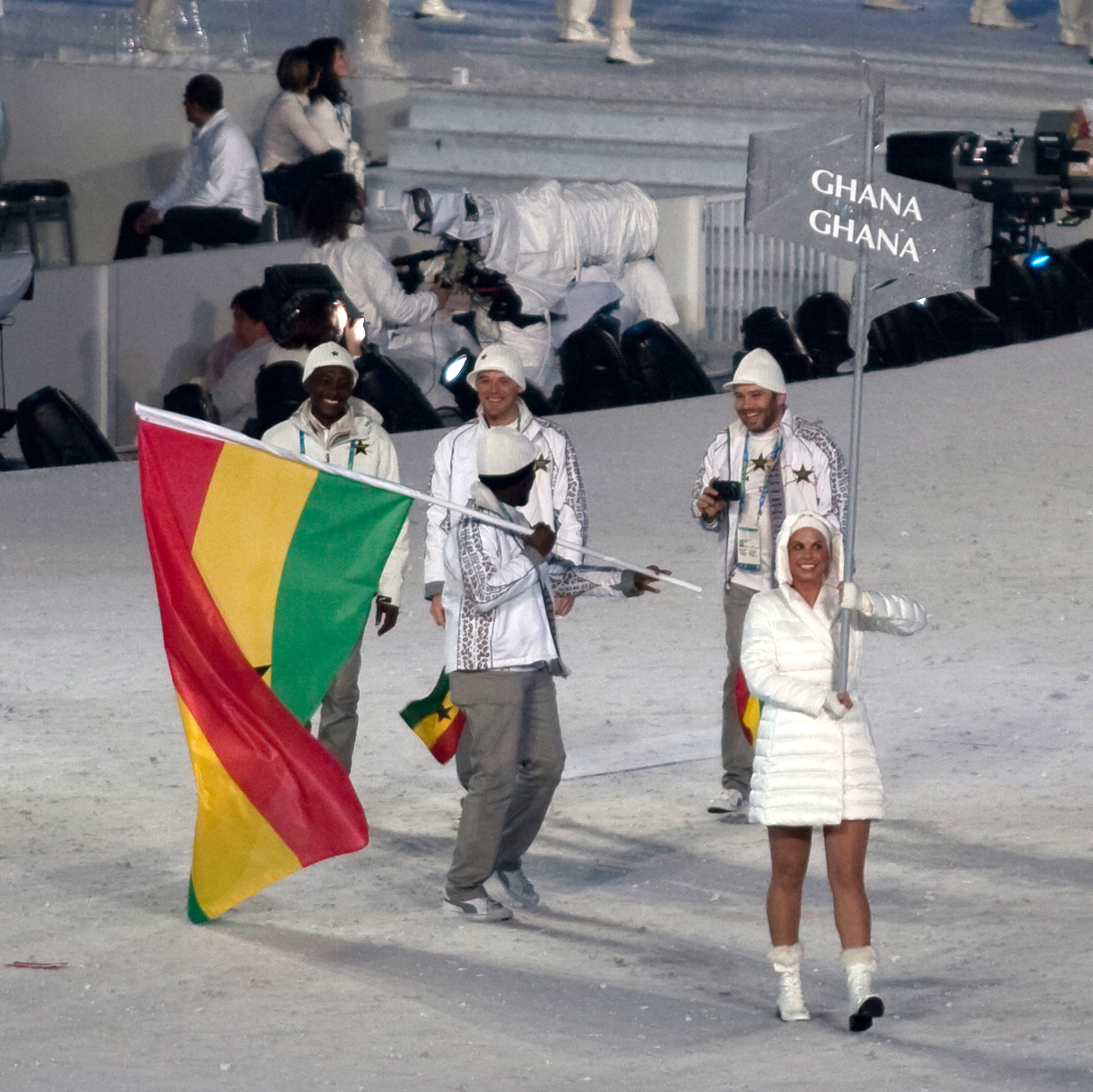

Personal information
- Nationality: Ghanaian
- Born: 19 December 1974 (age 51) Glasgow, Scotland
- Height: 5 ft 10 in (1.78 m)
- Spouse: Sena

Sport
- Sport: Skiing
- Club: Snowzone MK, Milton Keynes; Base Camp Group, London

Achievements and titles
- Personal bests: 53rd men's slalom, 2010 Winter Olympics, Vancouver, British Columbia
- Updated on 12 February 2010

Kwame Nkrumah-Acheampong (born 19 December 1974), nicknamed "The Snow Leopard", is a retired Ghanaian skier and is the first person from Ghana to take part in the Winter Olympics, which he did at the 2010 Winter Olympics Vancouver, British Columbia taking part in the slalom. He finished 53rd out of 102 participants, of whom 54 finished.

== Early life ==
Nkrumah-Acheampong was born on 19 December 1974 in Glasgow, Scotland. He moved to Milton Keynes where he has resided since. He first learnt to ski at the city's artificial slope during working as an employee there.

== Skiing career ==
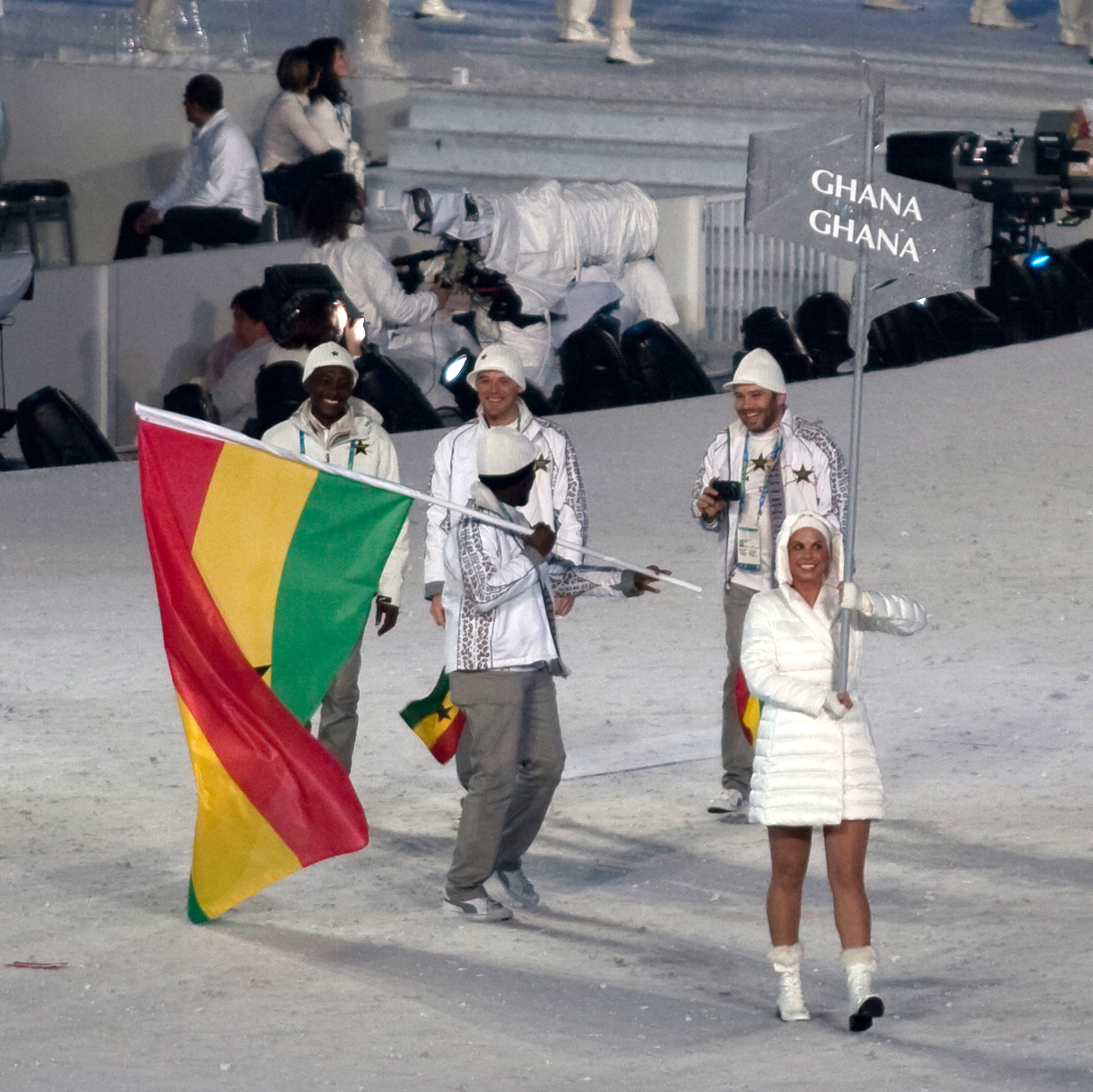
Kwame Nkrumah-Acheampong entering the stadium during the opening ceremony of the Winter Olympics of 2010.

=== Preparation ===
At the Ski Show in 2004 Nkrumah-Acheampong and his coach met Fergie Miller, the director of adventure training specialists Base Camp Group. Miller had approached them, thoroughly intrigued by their Ghana Ski Team jackets. After hearing of their extraordinary ambitions of competing in the Olympic Games, Miller decided to help in any way he could. Base Camp sent Nkrumah-Acheampong out to Méribel on one of their courses, a trip which would be his first steps on real snow. Nkrumah-Acheampong was somewhat anxious at the sheer scale of the slopes and mountains but after a few runs he was more than confident and he progressed in leaps and bounds.

During the following season, Nkrumah-Acheampong trained with French coaches, and ex-French ski team members, Pascal Blanc and Didier Schmidt, training predominantly in the Giant Slalom event on the Stade de Slalom, Méribel. He later became a slalom skier also, recording his best results in the discipline, where speed and agility are of paramount importance.

=== Qualification ===
In 2005, Nkrumah-Acheampong attempted to qualify for the 2006 Winter Olympics in Turin, Italy. However, he failed to arrive at the qualifying stages being held in Iran because his flight was grounded in Amsterdam, Netherlands because of icing on its wings.

In 2009, Nkrumah-Acheampong qualified for the 2010 Winter Olympics of 2010, scoring 137.5 International Ski Federation points, within the qualifying range of 120 to 140 points. He took part in the men's slalom where he finished 53rd out of 102 competitors, 54 of whom finished the race.

== Charity and development work ==
Nkrumah-Acheampong is supporting projects to promote winter sports in Ghana. He set up the Ghanaian Winter Olympic Association, and he has gotten government backing to build Ghana's first artificial ski slope, which he plans to build in the Akuapem Hills of Mamfe. This slope was planned to be finished in time for the 2014 Winter Olympics.

Nkrumah-Acheampong also supports a range of charities, including Sabre, a British charity working in Ghana which builds schools in deprived areas. He also donates any spare sponsorship money to a charity helping to save the snow leopard from extinction.

== In popular culture ==
Canadian musician Ashley MacIsaac also wrote a charity single, "Dreams", to benefit Nkrumah-Acheampong and his charitable efforts. In addition to the Canadian musicians Matthew Harder of the band House of Doc and Geoffrey Kelly, Vince Ditrich and Tobin Frank of the band Spirit of the West, Nkrumah-Acheampong himself took part in the recording by playing traditional Ghanaian percussion instruments. The single, credited to The Parallel Band, was released to iTunes on 19 February 2010.

Nkrumah-Acheampong can also be seen in Season 9 Episode 11 of the hit ITV show Airline.

== Personal life ==
Nkrumah-Acheampong is married to his wife Sena. She works as a secretary at the Open University in Milton Keynes. They have two children, daughter Ellice and son Jason. He is not related to the former President of Ghana Kwame Nkrumah (1909–72).

Nkrumah-Acheampong practised at the Mount Washington Alpine Resort on Vancouver Island for the 2010 Winter Olympics from 31 January to 9 February in Vancouver, British Columbia.

== See also ==
- Ghana at the 2010 Winter Olympics
- Tropical nations at the Winter Olympics
- Jamaica national bobsled team
- Eric "The Eel" Moussambani
- Eddie "The Eagle" Edwards

Olympic Games
Preceded by Vida Anim	Flagbearer for Ghana; 2010 Vancouver	Succeeded by Maxwell Amponsah
