= 20 Years of Stony Plain =

Compilation album by various artists
- Released: 1996
- Genre: Country
- Label: Stony Plain Records

20 Years of Stony Plain is a compilation album, released in 1996 on Stony Plain Records to mark the label's 20th anniversary. It features tracks by many of the artists who have released material on the label.

== Track listing ==
=== Disc One ===
No.	Title	Performing Artist(s)	Length
1.	"Mystery Train, Pt. 2"	Steve Earle
2.	"Long Long Time to Get Old"	Great Speckled Bird
3.	"Crossing the Causeway"	Grievous Angels
4.	"Sleeping Alone"	Cindy Church
5.	"The Guy Who Came in from the Cold"	Jr. Gone Wild
6.	"Small Town Talk"	Maria Muldaur and Amos Garrett
7.	"You Were on My Mind"	Sylvia Fricker
8.	"Political"	Spirit of the West
9.	"The Brand New Tennessee Waltz"	Jesse Winchester
10.	"Rock 'N' Roll Dreams"	Gary Fjellgaard
11.	"Heartbreak of the Week"	Rita Chiarelli with Prairie Oyster
12.	"How Long Can She Last (Going That Fast)"	Webb Wilder
13.	"Wrecked on the Highway"	Paul Hann
14.	"The Car Hank Died In"	Austin Lounge Lizards
15.	"Banks of the Old Pontchartrain"	Doug Sahm, Amos Garrett and Gene Taylor
16.	"Rainin' in My Heart"	Jo-El Sonnier
17.	"The Jealous Kind"	Bobby Charles
18.	"This Time"	South Mountain
19.	"Navajo Rug"	Tom Russell with Ian Tyson
20.	"The Circle Is Through"	Suzy Bogguss with Ian Tyson

=== Disc Two ===
No.	Title	Performing Artist(s)	Length
1.	"I Tried"	Duke Robillard
2.	"Playful Baby"	Duke Robillard with Jimmy Witherspoon
3.	"Tell Me Again"	The Holmes Brothers
4.	"Don't You Feel My Leg (Don't You Get Me High)"	Maria Muldaur
5.	"Oh Well, Oh Well"	Powder Blues Band with Lowell Fulson
6.	"It's Too Late Brother"	Long John Baldry
7.	"Going, Going, Gone"	Dutch Mason
8.	"Great Change"	Gospel Hummingbirds
9.	"Monkey See, Monkey Do"	Coco Montoya
10.	"That River"	Jim Byrnes
11.	"New York Boogie"	Roosevelt Sykes
12.	"Wrong Lake to Catch a Fish"	Amos Garrett
13.	"Rockin' Little Boogie"	Downchild Blues Band
14.	"Mighty Crazy"	King Biscuit Boy
15.	"Badly Bent"	Crowbar
16.	"Mess Around"	Professor Longhair
17.	"I Want Whacha Got"	Ellen McIlwaine
18.	"Blue Winding Mind"	Sugar Blue with Johnny Shines
19.	"Gotta Gimme Some of It"	John P. Hammond with Paul James
20.	"Shakey's Edmonton Blues"	Big Walter Horton
