= Political (song) =

Single by Spirit of the West

from the album Labour Day
- Released: 1988
- Recorded: 1988
- Genre: Folk rock
- Length: 4:27
- Label: Stony Plain
- Songwriter(s): John Mann; Geoffrey Kelly; Hugh McMillan
- Producer(s): Spirit of the West; Danny Greenspoon

Spirit of the West singles chronology
"The Crawl" (1986)	"Political" (1988)	"Save This House" (1990)

Music video
- "Political" on YouTube

"Political" is a song written by John Mann and recorded by Canadian folk rock group Spirit of the West. One of the band's most famous songs, it originally released in 1988 as the lead single from their second studio album Labour Day. While it failed to chart as a single in 1988, it was re-recorded and released in October 1991 as the second single from their fifth studio album Go Figure, peaking at number 70 in Canada in November 1991.

In 1995, "Political" was included in the band's concert with the Vancouver Symphony Orchestra. The version recorded at that show appears on their 1999 greatest hits compilation Hit Parade.

== Background and writing ==
In a 1993 concert performance on Public Radio International's Mountain Stage series, Mann explained some of the song's backstory, stating that the song was written about a real relationship Mann had once had, which ended while the couple were travelling in New York City. This performance appears on the album Upfront! Canadians Live from Mountain Stage. It was later revealed in the book Have Not Been the Same: The Can-Rock Renaissance 1985-1995 that the song was written about Mann's relationship with Jean Smith of the band Mecca Normal. In a later interview with CBC Radio, Mann revealed that Smith once attended one of the band's shows after the release of the song; although they did not directly interact, she passed a brief note to him through the bartender: "John, it wasn't that bad."

== Content ==
Despite the band's reputation for writing politically-themed songs, "Political" is in fact about the end of a personal romantic relationship. The verses detail the friction that led to the couple's breakup, and the chorus confirms that "Everything, every little thing, every little thing/With you and me had to be so political." Although the song was not a mainstream chart breakthrough for the band, it garnered them significant airplay on CBC Radio, CFNY and campus radio stations throughout Canada. This expansion of the band's audience led to a major label deal with Warner Music Canada, who released the band's next studio album, Save This House, in 1990.

== 1991 re-recording ==
In 1991, the band recorded a new rendition of the song. According to Geoffrey Kelly, the band's record company wanted the band to re-record and re-release the song because they felt it never had its chance to become a single. The band was against recording the song again because they liked the original version, and the band put off re-recording it until deciding to do so for their first rock album, Go Figure. Kelly stated that their first attempted re-recording of the song felt "so lifeless", so the band decided to re-record the song with a lot of new instruments. Although the lyrics remained identical (except for the word "little" being dropped from the chorus), the melody was moderately different and the instrumentation was more electric and rhythm-heavy. Kelly stated that the new version of the song was "a lot more true to the relationship John had had with that particular individual." The 1991 version was released as a CD single, with the B-sides "Home for a Rest", "Sad But True" and "Again and Again and Again". However, the new version proved controversial: at a concert in London, Ontario during their tour to promote that album, fans presented the band with a petition demanding that they play the original version of the song. As a result, on subsequent tours the band have always performed a third version of the song, which retained the rock instrumentation of the remake while reverting to the original melody.

== Critical reception ==
In 1999, "Political" was named one of CFNY's "Top 1002 New Rock Songs of All Time", ranking 524th. It ranked immediately ahead of The Verve Pipe's "Photograph" in 525th place, and behind Sting's "If You Love Somebody Set Them Free" in 523rd.

== Charts ==
=== Weekly charts ===
Chart (1991)	Peak position
Canada Top Singles (RPM)	70

== Covers ==
During Spirit of the West's 2009 live performances opening for Great Big Sea, the two bands frequently performed the song together, with Mann and Great Big Sea singer Alan Doyle alternating verses.

On November 23, 2019, The Watchmen performed the song live at their concert in Toronto as a tribute to John Mann, who had died three days before.
