= Weights and Measures (Spirit of the West album) =

Studio album by Spirit of the West
- Released: September 30, 1997
- Recorded: 1997
- Genre: Folk rock
- Length: 43:56
- Label: Warner Music Canada
- Producer: Michael Phillip Wojewoda and Spirit of the West

Spirit of the West chronology
Open Heart Symphony (1996)	Weights and Measures (1997)	Hit Parade (1999)

Weights and Measures is a 1997 album by Spirit of the West. It was their final album of new material for Warner Music Canada.

It was the band's first album following the departure of Linda McRae, to whom the final song "The Hammer and the Bell" is dedicated. It was also the band's most directly folk-influenced album in many years, as "Canadian Skye", "Rites of Man", "Circus" and "The Hammer and the Bell" are all arranged partly around traditional Celtic jigs and reels. This was once one of the band's trademarks, but one they had virtually abandoned on their 1990s albums.

The album was recorded in England at Presshouse studios owned by Jethro Tull guitarist Martin Barre. Barre appears on the album as a guest musician, along with Ric Sanders of Fairport Convention, Donald Shaw and Karen Matheson of Capercaillie, and Martin Bell from The Wonder Stuff.

For the album's supporting tour, Tobin Frank joined the band as a "special guest". He retained that billing for several years, but is now officially a member of the band.

Although the album was well received by critics, it was not widely promoted by the label, and sold poorly compared to the band's other 1990s efforts. It did not produce any hits for the band, although "Soldier's Boy" did receive limited airplay on Canadian radio.

Following this album, Spirit of the West were dropped from their record label. They moved to an independent label for their subsequent albums. Warner released a greatest hits compilation by the band, Hit Parade, in 1999, but the band did not release an album of new material until Star Trails in 2004.

== Track listing ==
All songs written by John Mann and Geoffrey Kelly.

1. "Canadian Skye" – 2:49
2. "Soldier's Boy" – 3:13
3. "Armstrong and the Guys" – 4:37
4. "Our Ambassador" – 4:42
5. "Rites of Man" – 5:06
6. "Bleeding Heart" – 5:02
7. "Heavenly Angel" – 4:16
8. "Waking the Lion" – 3:56
9. "Get Down Tonight" – 3:23
10. "Circus" – 3:06
11. "Death of the Party" – 4:01
12. "The Hammer and the Bell" – 6:47
