= Ashley MacIsaac =

Canadian musician (born 1975)

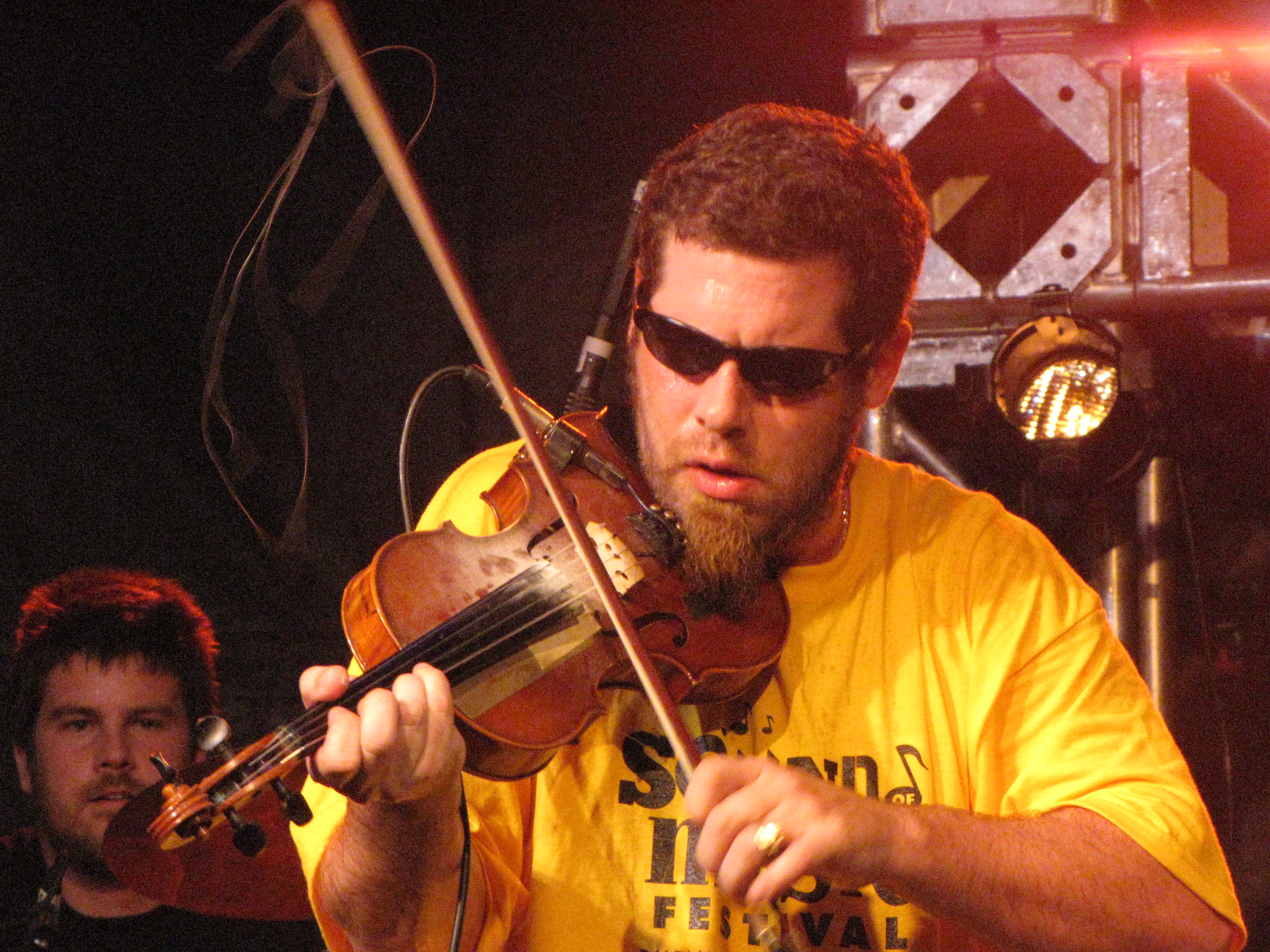
- MacIsaac performing at the Burlington Sound of Music festival in 2010. Neil MacIntosh also pictured on drums.

Background information
- Born: Ashley Dwayne MacIsaac; February 24, 1975 (age 51); Creignish, Inverness County, Nova Scotia, Canada
- Genres: Celtic fusion, folk, rock, hip hop
- Occupations: Musician, singer, songwriter
- Instruments: Fiddle, vocals
- Years active: 1992–present
- Labels: A&M, RCA, Decca, Linus, Loggerhead
- Website: ashleymacisaac.ca

Ashley Dwayne MacIsaac (born February 24, 1975) is a Canadian musician, singer, and songwriter from Cape Breton Island. He has received three Juno Awards, winning for Best New Solo Artist and Best Roots & Traditional Album – Solo at the Juno Awards of 1996, and for Best Instrumental Artist at the Juno Awards of 1997. His 1995 album Hi™ How Are You Today? was a double-platinum selling Canadian record. MacIsaac published an autobiography, Fiddling with Disaster in 2003.

== Life and family ==
MacIsaac was born in Creignish, Inverness County, Nova Scotia, on Cape Breton Island. His sister Lisa is also a fiddler, who has her own alternative country band, Madison Violet. She also appears on his album Helter's Celtic, which was recorded at Metalworks Studios in Mississauga, Ontario.

His cousins Alexis MacIsaac, Wendy MacIsaac and Natalie MacMaster are also touring fiddlers. He is also a cousin of the White Stripes guitarist and lead vocalist Jack White; MacIsaac and White's fathers are first cousins. The two met and MacIsaac opened for the White Stripes concert in Glace Bay, Nova Scotia in 2007.

MacIsaac spent time in New York City prior to his rise in the music industry. He says he was part of the club scene that also included Michael Alig and other Club Kids. MacIsaac says he briefly dated RuPaul and his experiences in New York City influenced some of his later music.

In 2007, MacIsaac married Andrew Stokes. According to MacIsaac, spoken during his February 25, 2017, concert at Koerner Hall in Toronto, they are now divorced. He lives in Windsor, Ontario.

== Career ==
MacIsaac's album Hi™ How Are You Today?, featuring the hit single "Sleepy Maggie", with vocals in Scottish Gaelic by Mary Jane Lamond was released in 1995. The song peaked at number 13 on the Canadian RPM Top Singles chart and found minor success in the United States, reaching number two on the Billboard Bubbling Under Hot 100. Hi™ How Are You Today? was a double-platinum selling Canadian record and earned MacIsaac a 1996 Juno in the category Best Roots & Traditional Album – Solo. During his early career, MacIsaac subtly acknowledged his sexual identity, sometimes wearing a set of rainbow flag freedom rings on a neck chain in promotional photos, but avoided explicitly coming out to the press. He officially came out in 1996 after Frank, a Canadian gossip magazine, published a cover story about his sexuality. In 1996, in a Maclean's interview, he claimed that he had discussed his sexual life, including his young boyfriend and a claimed fondness for watersports, in an interview with the LGBT newsmagazine The Advocate. The Advocate did not print any of the material, but Maclean's dropped him from its year-end honours list.

In 1996, MacIsaac toured the United States as an opening act for the Chieftains. It was widely reported in the media that another opener, folk singer Nanci Griffith, dropped out of the tour because she objected to MacIsaac's musical style, but Griffith later confirmed in Rolling Stone that her primary conflict was not with MacIsaac's style, but with tour organizers over how much time was available for her after the addition of MacIsaac to the bill. On a 1997 Late Night with Conan O'Brien appearance, his leg kick lifted his kilt high enough that his genitals were visible to the studio audience, although they were blurred out in post-production before the actual broadcast. On that same year he also featured as a guest on Toronto indie rock band Glueleg's final studio album, Clodhopper, specifically on the album's second track, "See Saw Man".

In 1998 MacIsaac fought successfully to be independent of his record label. He subsequently signed with the independent label Loggerhead Records for his 1999 album Helter's Celtic. During the promotional tour for that album, he indicated to the press that he had battled an addiction to crack cocaine from 1997 to 1999. In 1999, a journalist for The New Yorker noted MacIsaac's rock-star bravado and eccentricities.

In December 1999, MacIsaac screamed obscenities at a New Year's Eve rave in Halifax; the performance led to cancellations of his concerts across Canada and a "media frenzy over his perceived downward spiral". MacIsaac got into a media spat with his label Loggerhead after the label sent out a press release distancing itself from his actions. Also the same year, MacIsaac told the Halifax Chronicle-Herald that he was on the verge of declaring bankruptcy, retracted the statement within a few days, and then actually filed for bankruptcy several months later.

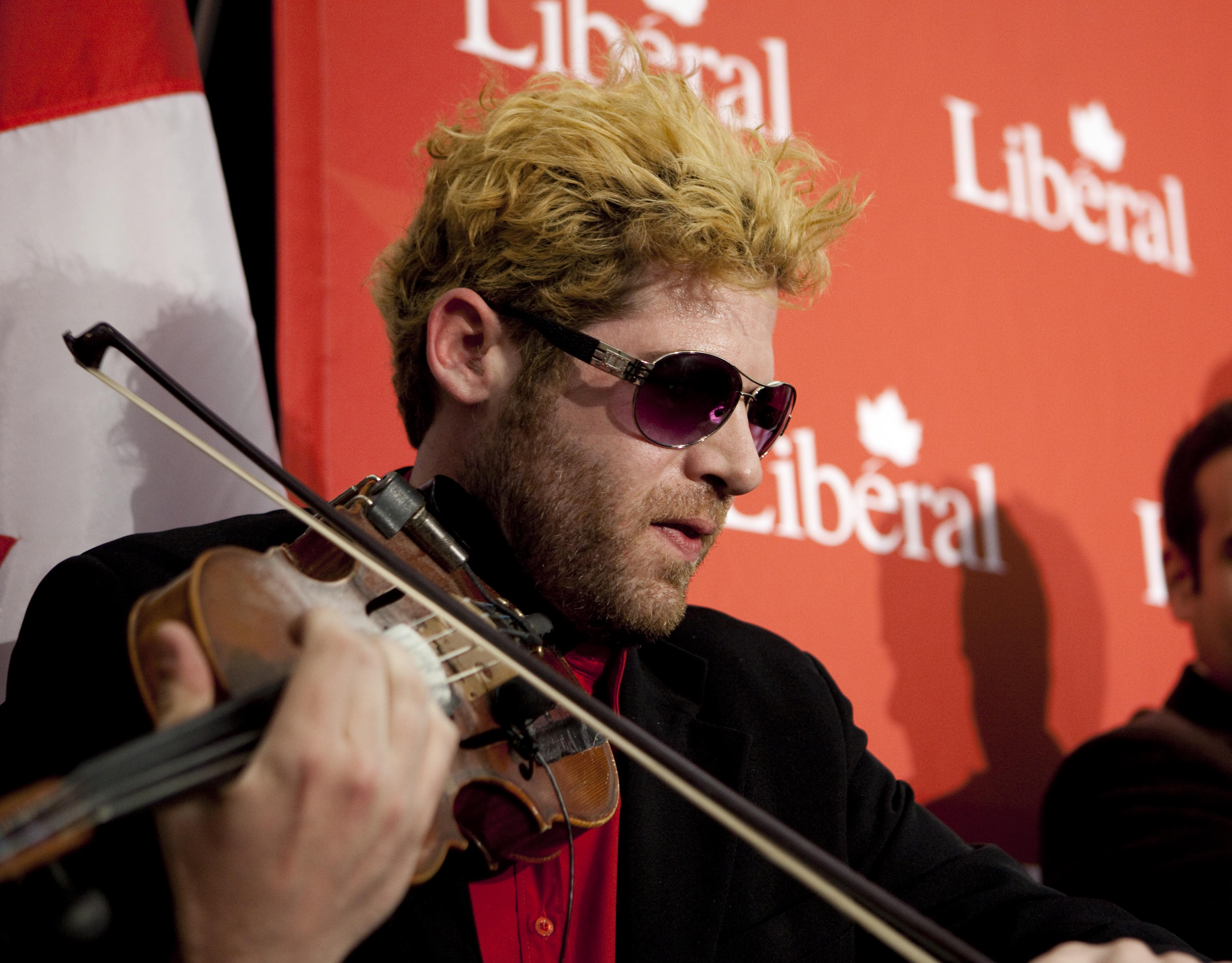
MacIsaac playing at a 2011 Liberal Campaign Rally with Michael Ignatieff.

In 2003, MacIsaac was alleged to have made a racist statement on stage, at a show where he reportedly accused an Asian woman in the audience of spreading SARS. He subsequently stated that the comment was intended as an ironic parody of racism, and sued the Ottawa Citizen for misrepresenting the statement as racist when in fact he was speaking out against racial profiling happening in Canada at the time. In 2005, MacIsaac signed on with Linus Entertainment, forming a rock band with himself on lead vocals and guitar. In 2010, MacIsaac wrote a charity single, "Dreams", to benefit Kwame Nkrumah-Acheampong, a skier from Ghana who was the first Ghanaian athlete ever to compete in the Winter Olympics. In addition to Matthew Harder of the band House of Doc and Geoffrey Kelly, Vince Ditrich and Tobin Frank of the band Spirit of the West, Nkrumah-Acheampong himself participated in the recording, playing traditional Ghanaian percussion. The single, credited to the Parallel Band, was released to iTunes on February 19, 2010. MacIsaac also performed in the opening ceremonies for the 2010 Olympic Games in Vancouver.

In 2016, MacIsaac co-hosted, with Heather Rankin, the East Coast Music Awards.

In December 2025, MacIsaac announced he was considering suing Google after its algorithms confused him with a different Ashley MacIsaac, one who lived in Newfoundland, causing its AI overview incorrectly labelling him a sex offender, resulting in a concert scheduled in the Sipekne'katik First Nation being cancelled. The Sipekne'katik First Nation issued a public apology to MacIsaac. In May 2026, he formally launched the lawsuit.

== Political involvement ==
MacIsaac has declared an interest in politics and has stated, in a letter to the National Post, that he is studying constitutional law so as to pursue an entry into Canadian federal politics.

In the March 20, 2006, edition of the Halifax Daily News, MacIsaac declared himself a candidate for the leadership of the Liberal Party of Canada. He denied that his campaign was a publicity stunt, telling the Canadian Press that he fully intended to mount a serious campaign, but on June 21, 2006, he decided to no longer take part in the leadership race. In 2013, he again suggested to the press that he was interested in entering politics, although he did not specify for which political party.

In 2019, it was reported that MacIssac had joined the Conservative Party of Canada.

== Equipment and playing style ==
MacIsaac plays a right-handed fiddle left-handed, most notably allowing it to remain strung right-handed, a highly unusual style of playing. MacIsaac however explained in a 2014 interview for the Celtic Colours Festival that during his first fiddle lesson with Stan Chapman when his father asked if he should change the strings around the other way, Stan said "Well, if you change the strings on your fiddle, you'll never be able to play anyone else's fiddle. So if he's gonna learn that way, learn that way". In the same interview, MacIsaac also elaborated that his unorthodox playing style allows the lower notes to remain on the lower side of the fiddle, and this allows him to go up to the higher notes; he said it "just makes sonic sense" to him to have the strings upside down.

== Discography ==
=== Albums ===
Year	Album	Chart Positions			CRIA
Year	Album	CAN	CAN Country	US Heat	CRIA
1992	Close to the Floor	71	10		
1993	A Cape Breton Christmas (Ashley MacIsaac and Friends)				
1995	Hi™ How Are You Today?	6		20	2× Platinum
1996	Fine, Thank You Very Much	24			
1999	Helter's Celtic				
2001	capebretonfiddlemusicNOTCALM (with Howie MacDonald)				
2003	Ashley MacIsaac				
2004	Live at the Savoy				
2005	Fiddle Music 101 (with Dave MacIsaac)				
2006	Pride				
2008	The Best of Ashley MacIsaac				
2011	Crossover				
2014	Beautiful Lake Ainslie (with Barbara MacDonald Magone)				
2016	FDLER (featuring Ashley MacIsaac and Jay "Sticks" Andrews)				

=== Singles ===
Year	Single	Chart Positions						Album
Year	Single	CAN AC	CAN Dance	CAN	US Adult	US Dance	US	Album
1995	"The Square Dance Song" (with BKS)		18					Astroplane (BKS album)
1995	"Sleepy Maggie"	42	15	13		29	102	Hi™ How Are You Today?
1995	"The Devil in the Kitchen"	47		53				Hi™ How Are You Today?
1997	"Brenda Stubbert"							Hi™ How Are You Today?
1998	"Great Divide" (with Bruce Hornsby)	43			33			Spirit Trail (Bruce Hornsby album)

== Filmography ==
- The Hanging Garden – Basil, wedding musician (1997)
- Power Play – himself (one episode, 1999)
- New Waterford Girl – Town fiddler (1999)
- Nabbie's Love – Ashley O'Connor (1999)
- Marion Bridge – Mickey (2002)
- Life and Times – himself (one episode, 2005)
- Through the Times Self released DVD – himself at the Doryman Tavern
- Under Great White Northern Lights – Ashley performance Savoy Theatre, Glace Bay (2009)
- Storage Wars Canada – as himself, appraises found violin (2015)
- Celebrity Portraits – as himself 2 episodes (2009)
- Son of Man – Mark (short film, 2023)

== See also ==
- Music of Canada
- Canadian rock
- List of Canadian musicians
