= SOTW =

SOTW may refer to:

- Ottweiler (Saar) station
- "Smoke on the Water", a song by Deep Purple
- Spirit of the West (disambiguation)
- Secret of the Wings, a 2012 Disney film
