= And if Venice Is Sinking =

"And If Venice Is Sinking"

Single by Spirit of the West

from the album Faithlift
- Released: October 1993
- Genre: Folk rock
- Length: 3:52
- Label: Warner Music Canada
- Songwriters: John Mann; Geoffrey Kelly
- Producer: Michael Phillip Wojewoda

Spirit of the West singles chronology
"Political" (1991)	"And If Venice Is Sinking" (1993)	"5 Free Minutes" (1994)

Music video
- "And if Venice Is Sinking" on YouTube

"And if Venice Is Sinking" is a song written by John Mann and Geoffrey Kelly for the Canadian folk-rock band Spirit of the West. Spirit of the West recorded the song on their studio album Faithlift. It also appeared on their greatest hits album Hit Parade, both in the original studio single and as a live recording with the Vancouver Symphony Orchestra.

== Content ==
The song is about Mann's honeymoon in Venice with his wife, Jill Daum. Infatuated with the city, Mann expresses his desire never to leave by alluding to the sinking of the city and asserting that he'll go down with it: "And if Venice is sinking/Then I'm going under". The song also references Marino Marini's sculpture “L’Angelo della Città”:

We made love upon a bed

That sagged down to the floor
In a room that had a postcard on the door
Of Marini's Little Man
With an erection on a horse

It always leaves me laughing

Several of the band's friends and family members, as well as producer Michael Phillip Wojewoda, also appear on the track as backing vocalists on the song's final chorus, and are credited in the album's liner notes as "Venetian Choir". Daum herself can be heard laughing in the background after the word "erection".

== Chart performance ==
It proved to be Spirit of the West's most successful single on the Canadian pop charts, reaching #30 on the RPM Top 100 singles chart the week of November 20, 1993, and #12 on the adult contemporary charts the week of January 31, 1994; it was also the band's only single ever to appear on the magazine's country music charts, peaking at #93 in the week of October 9, 1993.

However, some radio stations played an edited version with the words "with an erection" blanked out.

Chart (1993–1994)	Peak position
Canada Top Singles (RPM)	30
Canada Adult Contemporary (RPM)	12
Canada Country Singles (RPM)	93

=== Year-end charts ===
Chart (1994)	Position
Canada Adult Contemporary Tracks (RPM)	95

== Awards ==
Douglas Koch won the cinematography award at the MuchMusic Video Awards for the song's video. The video was also a nominee for Best Video.
