= Go figure =

Go Figure may refer to:

- Go Figure (album), an album by Spirit of the West
- Go Figure! (game), a math game in Microsoft's Windows Entertainment Pack
- Go Figure (film), a 2005 television movie
  - Go Figure (soundtrack), the soundtrack to the film
