= Open Heart Symphony =

Studio album by Spirit of the West
- Released: May 21, 1996
- Recorded: 1995
- Genre: Folk rock, Symphonic rock
- Label: Warner Music Canada
- Producer: Spirit of the West

Spirit of the West chronology
Two Headed (1995)	Open Heart Symphony (1996)	Weights and Measures (1997)

Singles from Open Heart Symphony
- 1. "Williamson's Garage" Released: May 9, 1996

Professional ratings
Review scores
Source	Rating
Allmusic	4/5 stars

Open Heart Symphony is a 1996 album by Spirit of the West, in collaboration with the Vancouver Symphony Orchestra.

The band recorded two shows with the orchestra on May 12 and May 13, 1995, at the Orpheum Theatre. The shows included several renditions of the band's best known songs, and an entire album's worth of songs written specifically for the symphony shows. The new songs were compiled on the album Open Heart Symphony; several of the hits performed at the shows appear on the band's 1999 compilation Hit Parade.

The shows were also taped for broadcast on the Canadian arts channel Bravo!.

== Song notes ==
A studio version of "Kiss and Tell" appeared on the 1997 soundtrack album to the film The Hanging Garden, and a previously unreleased demo version was released on the band's 2008 compilation album Spirituality 1983–2008: The Consummate Compendium.

"Let the Ass Bray" was reportedly written after Mann and Kelly attended a Radiohead concert at which Thom Yorke angrily refused an audience member's request to play "Creep" even though it was Radiohead's only notable hit single at the time.

== Cover art ==
The photo used on the album cover was taken in the "Confederation Lounge" at the Hotel Macdonald in Edmonton, Alberta. The large painting hanging above the band members' heads is a reproduction by Frederick Challener of the famous "Fathers of Confederation" portrait originally painted by Robert Harris. As the original Harris painting was lost in the Parliament fire of 1916, this reproduction is one of only two versions depicting an historic event in Canadian history.

== Reissue ==
The album was reissued in 2008 on Rhino Records, concurrently with the release of the band's career retrospective Spirituality 1983-2008: The Consummate Compendium.

== Track listing ==
All songs by John Mann and Geoffrey Kelly, except where noted.

1. "Williamson's Garage"
2. "Daisy's Dead"
3. "Frankfurt, I'm Sorry"
4. "Christmas Eve" (traditional)
5. "Resurrection"
6. "The Miller's Daughter" (Kelly)
7. "Bare Branches"
8. "Strange Bedfellows"
9. "Kiss and Tell"
10. "Milk, Tea and Oranges"
11. "Let the Ass Bray"
