= Mary Jane Lamond =

Canadian Celtic folk musician

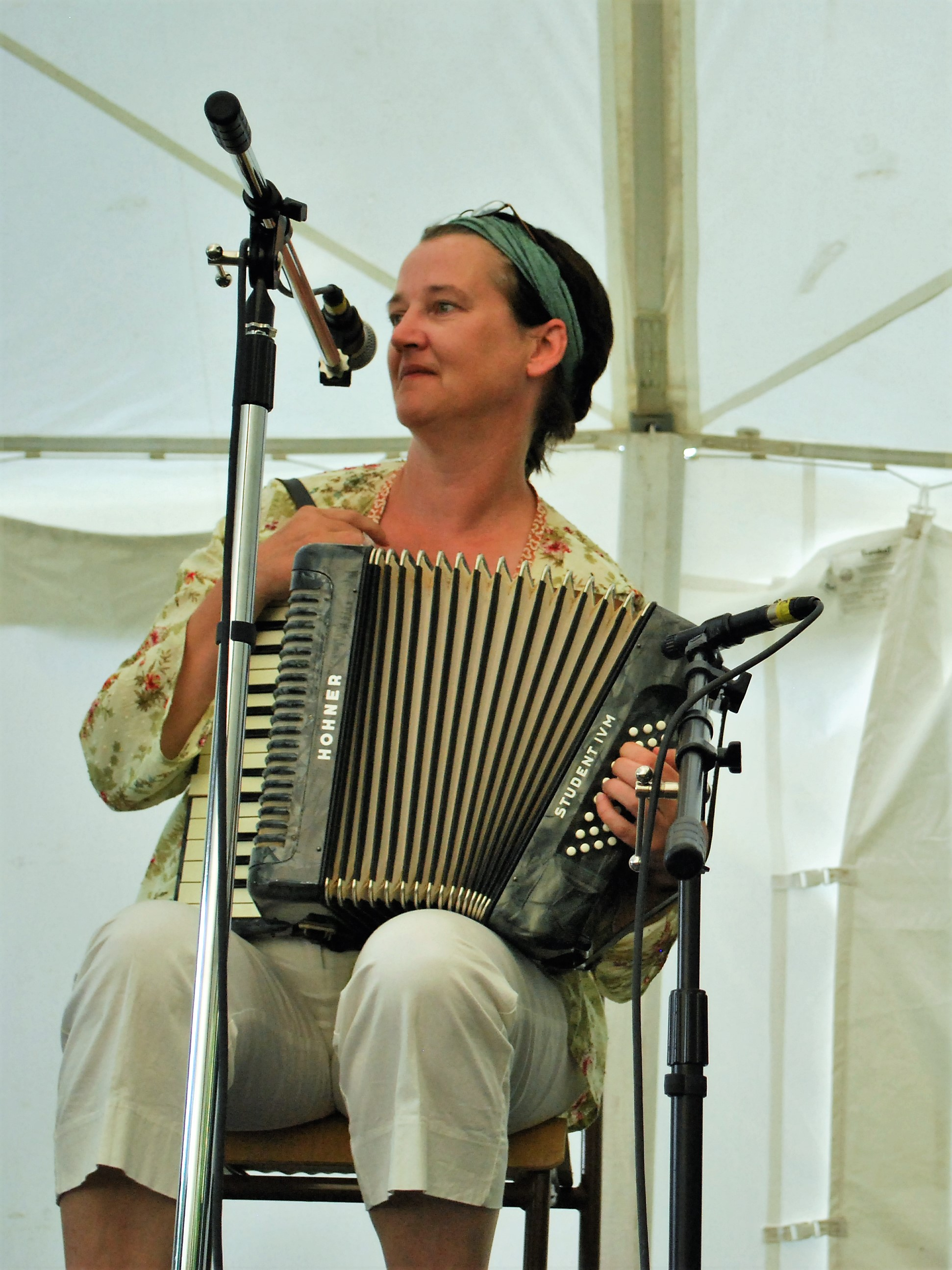
- Mary Jane Lamond, August 2009

Background information
- Born: Kingston, Ontario, Canada
- Genre: Celtic folk
- Occupations: Songwriter, performer, recording artist
- Instruments: Vocals, accordion
- Years active: 1995-present
- Labels: New Scotland Records, Pheromone Recordings
- Website: maryjanelamond.ca

Mary Jane Lamond is a Canadian Celtic folk musician who performs traditional Canadian Gaelic folk songs from Cape Breton Island. Her music combines traditional and contemporary material. Lamond is the vocalist on Ashley MacIsaac's 1995 hit single "Sleepy Maggie", and "Horo Ghoid thu Nighean" was the first single from her 1997 album Suas e!. Her 2012 collaboration with fiddler Wendy MacIsaac, Seinn, was named one of the top 10 folk and Americana albums of 2012 by National Public Radio in the United States.

== Early life and education ==
Born in Kingston, Ontario, the youngest of five children, Lamond moved a number of times during her childhood, to a series of cities and towns in Ontario and Quebec. Her parents were both originally from Nova Scotia, however, and she often visited her father's parents in Cape Breton during her summer vacations. There she was first exposed to Celtic culture in general and to Scottish Gaelic music and the Scottish Gaelic language in particular. Lamond graduated from Westmount High School in Montreal, and then returned to Nova Scotia to enroll in the Celtic Studies program at St. Francis Xavier University, where she studied the school's collection of 350 field recordings of traditional Scots-Gaelic songs. She graduated with a minor in Music at St. Francis Xavier University in Antigonish, Nova Scotia.

== Career ==
While still a student, Lamond recorded an album of traditional material called Bho Thir Nan Craobh (From the Land of the Trees), which she released independently in 1994. Among the musicians on the album was fiddler Ashley MacIsaac. MacIsaac had first seen Lamond perform in 1991 with a local band in Antigonish and was impressed with what he saw as her "punk attitude," even as she was singing Gaelic songs. MacIsaac and Lamond collaborated again in 1995 on the song "Sleepy Maggie" for his album Hi™ How Are You Today?, which became a breakthrough recording for both of them.

Lamond followed this up with a solo album in 1997 called Suas e! (which in English means, roughly, "Go for it!"). The album was nominated for a Juno Award and an East Coast Music award. She released Làn Dùil in 1999, which cultural magazine PopMatters said "should establish her as a major talent in Celtic and world music. Orain Ghàidhlig, most of which was recorded live in North River, Cape Breton Island, followed in 2001.

After 2000, Lamond mostly put her solo recording career aside for a variety of other projects, including composition for film and stage, and working with a variety of cultural agencies. Her most recent solo album to date is the 2005 recording Stòras, which means "a treasure" in English. Also in 2005, she contributed the song "Mo Mhaeli Bheag Og" to the charity album Voyces United for UNHCR.

She has been active in the ongoing preservation and revitalization of the Scottish Gaelic culture in Cape Breton as a member of the Gaelic Council of Nova Scotia and the Creative Nova Scotia Leadership Council, and as a teacher of Gaelic language and song workshops.

In September 2012, Lamond and fiddler Wendy MacIsaac released the album Seinn. "Their guitar-and-fiddle matchup is beautifully balanced, behind butter-smooth vocals and timeless melodies," said a reviewer on NPR, which named the album as one of the year's top 10 folk and Americana albums. In November 2013, Seinn won a Canadian Folk Music Award for traditional album of the year and a Music Nova Scotia award for traditional/roots recording of the year.

== Current work ==
In September 2017, Lamond announced a new collaborative project, Patchwork, "a project dedicated to the presentation of traditional song in a contemporary context." Patchwork consists of Lamond and her cousin, Laurel MacDonald, who perform Gaelic and English language songs. They perform a show entitled "She Sings as She Flies: Revisiting the Helen Creighton Song Collection," and will be joined by Nicole LeBlanc, Kirsten Olivia, and Naomi Dawn Poulette singing songs from the Acadian, African Nova Scotian, and Mi'kmaq communities, respectively.

== Discography ==
Albums

- Bho Thir Nan Craobh (1995) (English: From the Land of the Trees)
- Suas e! (1997) (English: Go For It!)
- Làn Dùil (1999) (English: Full of Hope)
- Orain Ghàidhlig (2001) (English: Gaelic Songs)
- Storas (2005) (English: A treasure)
- Seinn (2012) with Wendy MacIsaac

Contributing artist

- The Rough Guide to the Music of Canada (2005)

== Awards and achievements ==
1996

- ECMA Award nomination – Female Artist (Bho Thir Nan Craobh)
- ECMA Award nomination – Roots/Traditional Artist (Bho Thir Nan Craobh)

1997

- Much Music Award – Global Groove – Bog a’ Lochain (Suas e!)
- ECMA Award – Single for Sleepy Maggie (hi how are you today?, Ashley MacIsaac)

1998

- JUNO Award nomination – Roots and Traditional Album: Solo (Suas e!)
- ECMA Award nomination – Female Artist (Suas e!)
- ECMA Award nomination – Album (Suas e!)
- ECMA Award nomination – Video for Bog a’ Lochain (Suas e!)

2000

- Juno Nomination – Roots and Traditional Album: Solo (Làn Dùil)
- ECMA Award nomination – Album (Làn Dùil)
- ECMA Award nomination – Roots/Traditional Solo Artist (Làn Dùil)
- ECMA Award nomination – Female Artist (Làn Dùil)
- ECMA Award nomination – Entertainer of the Year
- MIANS Award nomination – Female Artist

2001

- ECMA Award nomination – Female Artist (Òrain Ghàidhlig)

2002

- ECMA Award Roots/Traditional Solo Artist Of The Year Award

2005

- Canadian Folk Music Awards nomination – Traditional Singer
- Canadian Folk Music Awards nomination – World Music Artist

2006

- ECMA Award Female Artist of the Year Award (Stòras)
- ECMA Award Roots/Traditional Solo Artist of the Year Award

2007

- Women of Excellence Award Recipient

2008

- Portia White Award Recipient

2013

- Canadian Folk Music Award winner - Traditional Album (Seinn)
- Canadian Folk Music Award nomination - Traditional Singer
- Canadian Folk Music Award nomination - Ensemble
- Music Nova Scotia Award winner - Traditional/Roots Recording (Seinn)
- Music Nova Scotia Award nomination - Group Recording
