= Spirit of the West (disambiguation) =

Spirit of the West is a Canadian alternative rock band.

Spirit of the West may also refer to:

- Spirit of the West (album), their debut album
- Spirit of the West (film), a 1932 American western
- Spirit of the West (train), a former Australian restaurant train
