= Jill Daum =

Canadian playwright and actress

- Born: Vancouver, British Columbia, Canada
- Occupations: Actress, Playwright
- Notable work: Forget About Tomorrow, Mom's the Word
- Spouse: John Mann
- Children: Harlan and Hattie (Daumann)

Jill Daum is a Canadian actress and playwright from Vancouver, British Columbia. She is most noted for her theatrical play Forget About Tomorrow, about a woman struggling to cope with her husband's diagnosis with early-onset Alzheimer's and based in part on her own marriage to musician and actor John Mann, and as a member of the "Mom's the Word" collective, who created several touring theatrical shows about women's experience of motherhood.

== Early career ==
Her early roles included productions of John Murrell's Farther West, Carol Bolt's Escape Entertainment, Myrna Kostash's No Kidding and Terry Jordan's Reunion.

In 1989, she also had a guest role in an episode of the television series Booker.

== Mom's the Word ==
In the early 1990s, Daum joined with Linda Carson, Alison Kelly, Robin Nichol, Barbara Pollard and Deborah Williams to write and stage the collective play Mom's the Word, a "kitchen table cabaret" about motherhood. The show premiered at Vancouver's Women in View Festival in 1994 before going into wider production in 1995. The play won two Jessie Richardson Theatre Awards in 1995, for outstanding original play or musical, and collective creation and performance. The collective subsequently toured the show across Canada, as well as staging it at the Melbourne International Comedy Festival in 1998. After five performances in Melbourne, the collective cast a group of Australian actresses to continue performing the show on a wider Australian tour. The show was also translated into French by Michel Tremblay.

In this era, Daum also had small roles in the film Head over Heels and the television series Cold Squad.

Daum, Kelly, Nichol, Pollard and Williams reunited in 2005 to create the sequel show Mom's the Word 2: Unhinged, using a similar format to address motherhood as children grow into their teens. The show again received a wider Canadian tour, although actress Susinn McFarlen performed Nichol's role on the tour. In 2009, the group staged Mom's the Word: Remixed, a show which mixed material from both of the earlier shows.

Mom's the Word 3: Nest Half Empty, a new show about how motherhood changes further as children become young adults and move out on their own, premiered in 2017.

== Forget About Tomorrow ==
After Mann was diagnosed with early onset Alzheimer's, Daum began to write Forget About Tomorrow, drawing both on her own experiences and those of other people she had met in a support group for caregivers of Alzheimer's patients. She shared the work with members of her writing workshop during the process, but in order to ensure that she was receiving honest critiques about her writing, rather than undue praise based in sympathy for her situation, she did not tell her colleagues in the writing group that the play had roots in her real life.

After Mann's diagnosis was publicized in 2014, Daum toured as a caregiver with Mann's band Spirit of the West as they undertook their final shows in 2015 and 2016. In this capacity, she appeared in the documentary film Spirit Unforgettable. She has also made several media appearances as a spokesperson for Alzheimer-related charity events, including a 2016 benefit concert for the Alzheimer Society of Canada, and as an advocate for improved support services for caregivers.

Forget About Tomorrow received its first production at the Vancouver Fringe Festival in 2015, before receiving its official premiere at the Belfry Theatre in Victoria, British Columbia in 2018.

== Personal life ==
Mann and Daum's honeymoon in Venice was the subject of one of Spirit of the West's most successful singles, "And if Venice Is Sinking". The couple have two children, Harlan and Hattie, who were given the blended surname Daumann to incorporate both Daum's and Mann's last names.
