= Spirit Unforgettable =

- Film poster
- Directed by: Pete McCormack
- Produced by: Pete McCormack; Ben Murray
- Starring: Spirit of the West
- Cinematography: Ian Kerr
- Edited by: Tony Kent
- Music by: Schaun Tozer
- Production companies: Bell Media; Little Kingdom Productions; Project 10 Productions
- Distributed by: HBO Canada
- Release date: April 30, 2016 (Hot Docs)
- Running time: 86 minutes
- Country: Canada
- Language: English

Spirit Unforgettable is a 2016 Canadian documentary film, which premiered at the Hot Docs Canadian International Documentary Festival in 2016. Directed by Pete McCormack, the film profiles the Canadian folk rock band Spirit of the West in preparation for a 2015 concert at Massey Hall, as part of their farewell tour following lead singer John Mann's diagnosis with early-onset Alzheimer's disease, interspersing the story of his diagnosis and the band's preparations for the concert with a portrait of their overall history.

At the time of the Massey Hall concert, it was possible but not definitive that due to Mann's cognitive decline, the show may have become the band's last concert performance. The band did, however, ultimately perform a few more times following the show, most notably for a three-night series of finale performances at Vancouver's Commodore Ballroom in April 2016.

Other figures appearing in the film include Mann's wife Jill Daum, an actress and playwright who has written her own theatrical play about Alzheimer's, Forget About Tomorrow; musician Paul Hyde, a longtime friend and early collaborator of the band, who both talks about his relationship with the band and performs a rendition of his song "I Miss My Mind the Most"; Mann and Daum's daughter Hattie Daumann; musician Craig Northey; the band's manager Janet Forsyth; former band member J. Knutson; and two of Mann's doctors.

McCormack, a longtime friend of the band, invested $100,000 of his own money in the film up front, telling The Globe and Mail that "I had to go and dive in right away … funding or no funding, because of the disease." The film did later secure funding, including a completion grant from the Shaw Media/Hot Docs Fund.

Many critics have singled out the band's live performance of their signature song "Home for a Rest" near the end of the film, which saw the entire audience begin to sing along the moment Mann had a slip in remembering the lyrics, as its life-affirming emotional climax.

The film aired on HBO Canada on July 1, 2016.

== Awards ==
At the 2016 Vancouver International Film Festival in October 2016, Spirit Unforgettable won the award for Most Popular Canadian Documentary (based on audience balloting).

== See also ==
- Long Time Running
