= Mudmen =

Canadian Celtic rock band

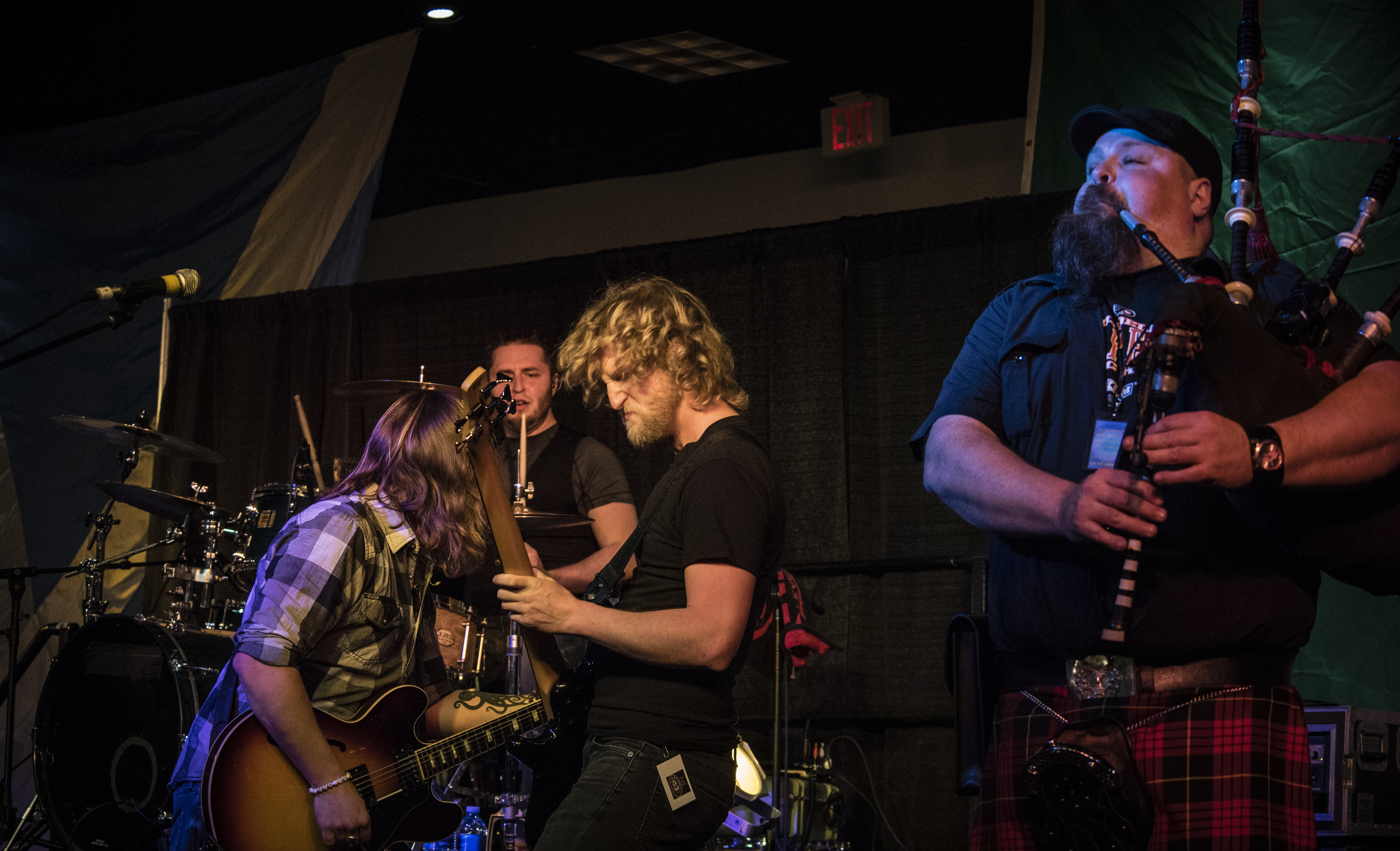
- Mudmen performing in 2016.

Background information
- Origin: Alvinston/Petrolia, Ontario, Canada
- Genres: Celtic rock
- Years active: 1998–present
- Labels: EMI, Sextant, Mudpiper
- Members: Robby Campbell; Sandy Campbell; Andy Gingerich; Alex Showdra; Colin Amey; Emmett Glancie
- Website: mudmen.ca

Mudmen are a Canadian Celtic rock band. They are best known for their singles "5 O'Clock", "Saturday", and "Drink and Fight" as well as their covers of Spirit of the West's "Home for a Rest" and AC/DC's "It's a Long Way to the Top (If You Wanna Rock 'n' Roll)".

== History ==
The Mudmen formed in Alvinston/Petrolia in 1998. The original band members were vocalist Zoy Nicoles, guitarist Lonny Knapp, bassist Tommy Skilton, drummer Ryan McCaffrey, and bagpipe-playing brothers Robby and Sandy Campbell, who were the founding members. The Campbell Brothers had previously been signed to the EMI label under their own name.

In 2001, the Mudmen performed at the Snow Jam festival in Halifax. That year, the band released a self-titled studio album; a second album, Overrated, followed in 2003. The band toured across Canada with Bif Naked and performed at several festivals, including Edgefest.

The Mudmen have released 11 studio albums: Mudmen (2001), Overrated (2003), Defending the Kingdom (2005), The High Road (2009), Another Day (2010), Donegal Danny (2012), Where I Came From (2013), Train (2015), Old Plaid Shirt (2016), Best of Mudmen (2021), and Farmers Tan (2022).

The band's music has been featured in various forms of popular culture. Their single "Lost", from their debut album, appeared in a promotional video for the NBC television series The Black Donnellys. Their single "Animal" was featured in the soundtracks of the video games Burnout 3: Takedown and MX vs. ATV Unleashed, as well as HBO's Shameless. The Campbell Brothers also appeared on the Bob and Doug’s 24th Anniversary Special and had music featured in Don Cherry’s hockey videos 9, 19, 2024, 27, and 29, as well as during the Coach’s Corner Dale Hunter tribute.

The Mudmen wrote and recorded the entrance theme music for the WWE tag team The Highlanders. They reached No. 19 on the Edge radio Top 20 countdown and had six music videos aired on MuchMusic. Career highlights include performing for Queen Elizabeth II, appearing at the 1984 Edmonton Oilers Stanley Cup reunion, performing at the Oilers and Flames home-opening ceremonies, and appearing at seven Grey Cups, three Memorial Cups, twelve Canada's Walk of Fame ceremonies, and two Special Olympics televised opening ceremonies. They have also opened for ZZ Top and The Guess Who. Collectively, Mudmen and the Campbell Brothers have performed more than 3,000 shows.

The Mudmen continue to perform. The Brantford Blast and Brantford Red Sox currently use the band's song "Go Team Go" as their entrance theme.

== Name and background ==
The band's name comes from the Campbell Brothers "founding members" occupation prior to forming the band. They were mixing mortar and carrying bricks for bricklayers.

The band's music is influenced by traditional Scottish music, as well as hard rock groups such as AC/DC. Mudmen have opened for many well-known bands, including ZZ Top, Tool, Dropkick Murphys, and Bowling for Soup, as well as fellow Canadians Nickelback, Sum 41, and The Guess Who.

== Band members ==
=== Current band members ===
- Robby Campbell - bagpipes
- Sandy Campbell - bagpipes
- Colin Amey - lead vocals, guitar
- Emmett Glancie - bass, backing vocals
- Andy Gingerich - drums
- Alex Showdra - guitar, backing vocals, banjo, mandolin

=== Former band members ===
- Dan Westenenk - bass, backing vocals
- Jeremy Burton - drums
- Steve Gore - lead vocals, guitar
- Zois (ZOY) Nicoles - lead vocals
- Lonny Knapp - guitar, backing vocals
- Tommy Skilton - bass, backing vocals
- Ryan McCaffrey - drums
- Mordy Harroch - lead vocals
- Alex Maletich - guitar, backing vocals, banjo, mandolin
- Troy Spinney - bass, backing vocals
- Matt Coburn - guitar, backing vocals
- Mike Meacher - lead vocals, guitar
- Jordon Brosseau - bass, backing vocals

== Discography ==
- Mudmen (2001, EMI)
- Overrated (2003 Sextent/EMI)
- Defending the Kingdom (2006 Mudpiper Records)
- The High Road (2009 Mudpiper Records)
- Another Day (2010, Mudpiper Records)
- Donegal Danny (2012, Mudpiper Records)
- Where I Came From (2013, Mudpiper Records)
- On a Train (2015, Mudpiper Records)
- Old Plaid Shirt (2016, Mudpiper Records)
- Best of Mudmen (2021, Mudpiper Records)
- Farmers Tan (2022, Mudpiper Records)
