= Water in the Well =

Water in the Well may refer to:

- "Water in the Well", song by Spirit of the West from 1990 album Save This House
- "Water in the Well", song by Shame from Drunk Tank Pink
