= Star Trails =

Studio album by Spirit of the West
- Released: July 6, 2004
- Recorded: 2003–04
- Genre: Folk rock
- Length: 43:56
- Label: MapleMusic Recordings
- Producer: Spirit of the West

Spirit of the West chronology
Hit Parade (1999)	Star Trails (2004)	Spirituality 1983–2008: The Consummate Compendium (2008)

Professional ratings
Review scores
Source	Rating
Now Magazine	3/5 stars

Star Trails is a 2004 album by Canadian band Spirit of the West. It was their first album of new material since Weights and Measures in 1997, and their first for independent label MapleMusic Recordings, but their final album of new material.

The album cover is a long-exposure photograph with "star trails", taken at Mount Kilimanjaro and created by leaving the camera's shutter open for a minimum of 15 minutes.

"July" was the album's first single, and the band's first significant radio hit since "Tell Me What I Think" (from the 1995 album Two Headed).

"Come Back Oscar" is a tribute to Calgary musician Oscar Lopez, a friend of the band's who had been absent from the folk festival circuit for several years due to a battle with depression. In what several music critics described as one of 2004's most thrilling moments in Canadian music, Lopez joined the band at the Calgary and Edmonton folk festivals in July to perform the song. According to one writer for the Calgary Sun, "if there was a dry eye in the house, it was glass."

"King of Scotland", the album's second single, is about Idi Amin, who once proclaimed himself king of Scotland after becoming infatuated with the country on a state visit to Great Britain.

"Enough, Already Alright (Hello Cleveland)" takes the Rock and Roll Hall of Fame to task for being nothing more than "a glorified Hard Rock Cafe," with none of the grit and excitement that is usually associated with rock and roll music.

== Track listing ==
All songs written by John Mann and Geoffrey Kelly.

1. "Small, Small World" – 6:00
2. "Waiting for Martin" – 6:27
3. "Come Back Oscar" – 3:47
4. "July" – 3:56
5. "The Wedding Speech (Drink and Be Merry)" – 3:24
6. "Out of the Boy" – 4:03
7. "Be a Guy" – 4:36
8. "Enough, Already Alright (Hello Cleveland)" – 4:29
9. "King of Scotland" – 3:12
10. "Morning in the Bath Abbey" – 3:56
