= Spirit of the West (album) =

Studio album by Spirit of the West
- Released: 1984
- Recorded: 1983–1984
- Genre: Folk
- Label: Independent
- Producer: Spirit of the West, Barney Bentall

Spirit of the West chronology
Spirit of the West (1984)	Tripping Up the Stairs (1986)

Spirit of the West is a 1984 album by Spirit of the West. It was their first album, and was released independently. The album is no longer in print, although portions of it were re-released on the 1989 compilation Old Material 1984-1986.

From the official Spirit of the West website: "The first album. Absolutely and thoroughly deleted, and therefore a priceless artifact. What a lovely photo. See "Old Material", above, for the half of the songs which have been authorized and preserved in marketable form by the erstwhile Mann and Kelly."

== Track listing ==
All songs by John Mann, Geoffrey Kelly and J. Knutson.

1. "Aberdeen"
2. "To a Highlander Unknown"
3. "The Lass from Gallowa"
4. "The Only Child"
5. "John Goodman"
6. "The Walker Spread"
7. "Rocks at Thieves' Bay"
8. "Doin' Quite Alright"
9. "Be Right"
10. "Down on the Dole"
11. "Without a Trace"
