= Hi™ How Are You Today? =

Studio album by Ashley MacIsaac
- Released: November 8, 1995
- Studios: Metalworks Studios, Mississauga, ON
- Genre: Folk rock
- Label: A&M
- Producers: Michael Phillip Wojewoda and Peter Prilesnik

Ashley MacIsaac chronology
A Cape Breton Christmas (1993)	Hi™ How Are You Today? (1995)	Fine®, Thank You Very Much (1996)

Singles from Hi™ How Are You Today?
- 1. "Sleepy Maggie" Released: 1995; 2. "The Devil in the Kitchen" Released: 1995; 3. "Brenda Stubbert" Released: 1997

Hi™ How Are You Today? is an album by Canadian fiddler Ashley MacIsaac, released in 1995 on A&M Records' Ancient Music imprint. MacIsaac's major label debut and his most commercially and critically successful album, it spawned the Canadian Top 40 hit "Sleepy Maggie" featuring Mary Jane Lamond, and won the Juno Award for Roots & Traditional Album of the Year – Solo at the Juno Awards of 1996.

The album was produced by Michael Phillip Wojewoda and Peter Prilesnik. Guest musicians on the album included Lamond, Gordie Johnson, Graeme Kirkland, Ian Blurton, Chin Injeti, Gordie Sampson, Chris Brown, Gerry Deveaux and the bands Jale and Quartetto Gelato.

"Sleepy Maggie" became a hit on Canadian radio and MuchMusic. It also received some attention in the United States. MacIsaac says the song was influenced by "Supermodel (You Better Work)", the 1992 single by RuPaul.

In 2005, the tenth anniversary of the album's release, it was re-released as a special edition, remastered and released with four new remixes of MacIsaac's most famous track, "Sleepy Maggie", along with the music video for the track.

== Track listing ==
1. "Beaton's Delight" (2:34),
2. "Sleepy Maggie" (5:35), Mary Jane Lamond/traditional
3. "Rusty D-con-STRUCK-tion" (3:00), traditional
4. "The Devil in the Kitchen" (2:25), traditional
5. "MacDougall's Pride" (5:03), Ashley MacIsaac, Gordie Sampson
6. "Spoonboy" (5:38), traditional
7. "What an Idiot He Is" (4:29), Bob Snider
8. "Sophia's Pipes" (3:16), traditional
9. "Sad Wedding Day" (3:15), Barbara Allen, Mary Jane Lamond
10. "Wing-Stock" (5:01), Stephen Cooney, traditional
11. "Hills of Glenorchy" (4:16), traditional
12. "Brenda Stubbert" (2:27),
13. "Catherine Cries" (6:00) – hidden track, not listed on cover. (aka Kill Your Foes), Jerry Holland

== Special Edition "Sleepy Maggie" Remixes ==
1. "The Sandman Mix" (5:33)
2. "The Deep Sleep Mix" (7:26)
3. "The BKS Chameleon Boom Mix 1" (6:33)
4. "The BKS Chameleon Boom Mix 2" (4:52)
