= South Mountain (band) =

- Origin: Ontario, Canada
- Genres: Country
- Years active: 1989-present
- Labels: Stony Plain Records
- Members: Steve Piticco (guitar); Kurk Bernard (vocals, bass guitar); Jay Riehl
- Past members: Don Reed (fiddle); Linsey Beckett (fiddle, 2011-2014); Tyler Beckett (fiddle, pre 2011)
- Website: http://www.southmountain.ca

South Mountain is a Canadian country music group. They received the 1991 Canadian Country Music Association Vista Rising Star Award. Their 1995 single "Radioland" reached the Top 20 of the RPM Country Tracks chart.

== Discography ==
=== Albums ===
Title	Details
Where There's a Will	Release date: March 28, 1995; Label: Stony Plain Records

=== Singles ===
Year	Single	Peak positions	Album
Year	Single	CAN Country	Album
1994	"Where There's a Will"	54	Where There's a Will
1995	"Radioland"	20	Where There's a Will
1995	"Truly, Madly"	60	Where There's a Will
1996	"Who Would Have Thought"	47	Where There's a Will
1996	"Goin' Nowhere"	74	—
1997	"I Believe in Angels"	76	—
