= Two Headed =

Studio album by Spirit of the West
- Released: June 20, 1995 (Canada); June 4, 1996 (U.S.)
- Recorded: 1995
- Genre: Folk rock
- Length: 46:22
- Label: Warner Music Canada
- Producer: Spirit of the West and Ken Marshall

Spirit of the West chronology
Faithlift (1993)	Two Headed (1995)	Open Heart Symphony (1996)

Professional ratings
Review scores
Source	Rating
Allmusic	3/5 stars

Two Headed is a 1995 album by Spirit of the West.

It is the band's darkest and heaviest album, with many songs directly addressing the subject of death. Ken Marshall, a noted Canadian producer of industrial music, produced the album, giving many songs a densely layered, textured production which results in an almost psychedelic hard rock sound.

The album reached #20 on RPM's Top 100 albums chart the week of July 31, 1995.

"Tell Me What I Think", the album's first single, was a notable hit, peaking at #25 on the RPM singles chart the week of August 14. The song was also released on CD single, with several remixes by Marshall. The song's video, directed by Morris Panych, was choreographed around a fixed-location camera. However, despite the song's chart success, the video became their first in many years not to receive significant rotation on MuchMusic.

== Promotion ==
In promotion for the album, Spirit of the West was featured on the cover of the June 11, 1995 issue of RPM magazine. The cover featured the band dressed in drag.

== Track listing ==
All songs by John Mann and Geoffrey Kelly.

1. "Wishing Line" – 3:49
2. "Blood and Honey" – 4:56
3. "Tell Me What I Think" – 3:53
4. "Never Had it in Me" – 4:25
5. "Scaffolding" – 5:07
6. "Two Headed" – 3:52
7. "Unplugged" – 3:14
8. "Mildred" – 3:37
9. "Pretend is Fun" – 3:24
10. "Can't Accept the Saint" – 5:22
11. "Pin-Up Boy" – 4:43
