= Faithlift =

Studio album by Spirit of the West
- Released: September 28, 1993 (Canada); May 10, 1994 (United States)
- Recorded: 1993
- Genre: Folk rock
- Length: 50:00
- Label: Warner Music Canada
- Producer: Michael Phillip Wojewoda

Spirit of the West chronology
| Go Figure (1991) | Faithlift (1993) | Two Headed (1995) |

Professional ratings
Review scores
| Source | Rating |
|---|---|
| Allmusic | 3/5 stars |

Faithlift is a 1993 album by Canadian band Spirit of the West.

It is the band's best-selling album, and includes their biggest Canadian Top 40 hit, "And if Venice Is Sinking." The album peaked at #27 on RPM's Top 100 albums chart the week of October 30, 1993.

Although Faithlift is one of the band's rock albums, several songs (particularly "Sadness Grows" and "Death on the Beach") retain the Celtic folk flavour that the band was previously known for.

The album includes many topical songs drawn from the news headlines: "Bone of Contention" mocks society's hypocrisy in the Pee-Wee Herman controversy, "Mum's the Word" is about the 1992 Giant Mine explosion, "God's Apprentice" addresses the Roman Catholic Church sex abuse scandal (which hit Canada several years earlier than it did the United States), and "Guildhall Witness" is about a race riot which the band encountered during its tour of England with The Wonder Stuff. "6th Floor" is about visiting Dallas and finding it impossible to resist going to see Dealey Plaza, the spot where John F. Kennedy was assassinated.

The album was reissued in 2008 on Rhino Records, concurrently with the release of the band's career retrospective Spirituality 1983-2008: The Consummate Compendium.

== Singles ==
- "And if Venice Is Sinking"

RPM Top 100: #30, November 20, 1993
RPM adult contemporary: #12, January 31, 1994

- "5 Free Minutes"

RPM Top 100: #55, February 28, 1994
RPM AC: #29, March 14, 1994

- "6th Floor"

did not chart

- "Sadness Grows"

RPM Top 100: #52, October 3, 1994
RPM AC: did not chart

- "Is This Where I Come In"

RPM Top 100: did not chart
RPM AC: #28, February 13, 1995

== Track listing ==
All songs by John Mann and Geoffrey Kelly.

1. "5 Free Minutes" – 4:00
2. "Sadness Grows" – 3:02
3. "Is This Where I Come In" – 3:47
4. "Bone of Contention" – 5:38
5. "Slow Learner" – 4:19
6. "And if Venice Is Sinking" – 3:52
7. "Mum's the Word" – 5:56
8. "Death on the Beach" – 5:01
9. "Sincerely Yours" – 2:32
10. "God's Apprentice" – 3:39
11. "Guildhall Witness" – 2:25
12. "6th Floor" – 5:49
