= Upfront! Canadians Live from Mountain Stage =

Live album by Various artists
- Released: 1994
- Label: Blue Plate Music

Upfront! Canadians Live from Mountain Stage is an album released in 1994 on Blue Plate Music and BMG Music Canada, which compiles live performances by Canadian artists who have appeared on the American radio series Mountain Stage.

The album was intended as a Canadian-only introduction to Mountain Stage, which was not widely broadcast in Canada. The Best of Mountain Stage series of compilation albums, which had already been available in the United States, was subsequently released in Canada.

== Track listing ==
1. Bruce Cockburn, "Waiting for a Miracle"
2. Barenaked Ladies, "What a Good Boy"
3. Crash Test Dummies, "Superman's Song"
4. Cowboy Junkies, "Misguided Angel"
5. Stephen Fearing, "Blue Line"
6. The Rankin Family, "Feir a bhata"
7. Sarah McLachlan, "Shelter"
8. Blue Rodeo, "Already Gone"
9. Spirit of the West, "Political"
10. Rick Danko and Garth Hudson, "Twilight"
11. Moxy Früvous, "The Greatest Man in America"
