= Tobin Frank =

Canadian musician

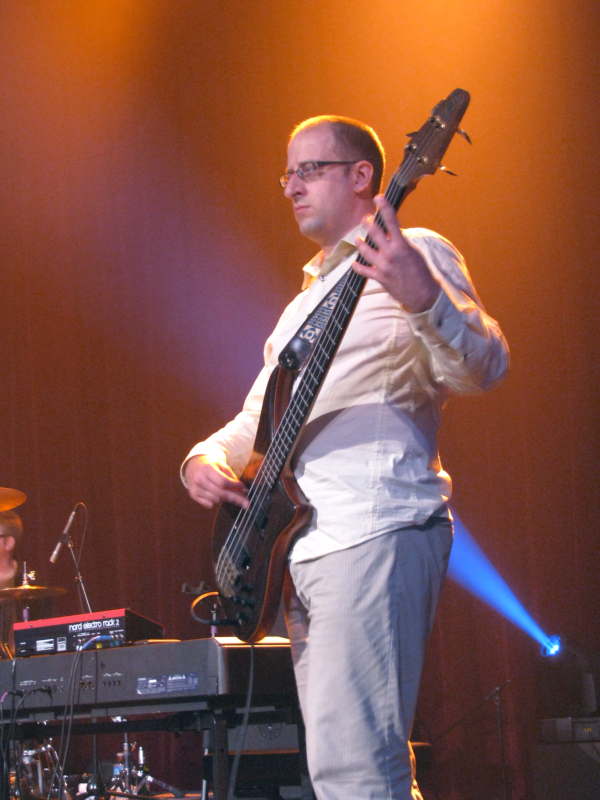
- Tobin performing with Spirit of the West, 2010

Background information
- Origin: British Columbia, Canada
- Occupation: Musician
- Instruments: Bass guitar, accordion, keyboards

Tobin Frank is a Canadian musician, who records, performs and tours with the bands Spirit of the West and The Paperboys. Primarily a bass guitarist, Frank also plays some accordion and keyboard parts.

Frank joined Spirit of the West as a temporary guest musician on the tour to support their 1997 album Weights and Measures, following Linda McRae's departure from the band. He later became a permanent member of the band, and first appeared on the band's 2004 album Star Trails.

Frank has also been a guest performer on albums by numerous other Canadian artists such as The Town Pants, a Vancouver-based Celtic rock band.

Frank is from the Bulkley Valley area of British Columbia but resides permanently on Vancouver Island with his family. He attended Capilano College's Jazz Studies program in North Vancouver. He has played several times at the popular Midsummer Festival of Smithers, British Columbia.

Tobin has an older brother Psam Frank, who is also a keyboardist in a country band.
