= Go Figure (album) =

Studio album by Spirit of the West
- Released: June 25, 1991
- Recorded: 1991
- Genre: Folk rock
- Label: Warner Music Canada
- Producer: Joe Chiccarelli

Spirit of the West chronology
Save This House (1990)	Go Figure (1991)	Faithlift (1993)

Professional ratings
Review scores
Source	Rating
Allmusic	3/5 stars

Go Figure is the fifth studio album by Canadian folk rock group Spirit of the West, released on June 25, 1991 by Warner Music Canada. It was the band's first rock album, and their first with drummer Vince Ditrich.

The album garnered the band new airplay on rock music radio stations, although it was controversial among the band's traditional folk music fan base. The album includes a rock rendition of "Political", one of the band's best known songs. During the concert tour to support this album, fans in one city actually presented the band with a petition requesting that they play the old version of that song.

Despite earning a gold record, the album was only a modest success on the charts, however, peaking at #45 on RPM's Top 100 albums chart.

A recurring theme throughout the album is disaffection with the government of then-Prime Minister Brian Mulroney. "D for Democracy", "Pulling Lame" and "Far Too Canadian" are all anti-Mulroney songs, reflecting the widespread popular opposition to Mulroney among the Canadian public which led to the 1992 defeat of the Charlottetown Accord and the Progressive Conservative decimation in the 1993 Canadian federal election. However, "D for Democracy" is not about Mulroney alone, as the song also touches on other contemporaneous stories of political malfeasance, such as the drug controversy surrounding Washington, DC mayor Marion Barry.

== Track listing ==
All songs by John Mann and Geoffrey Kelly.

1. "D for Democracy (Scour the House)" – 4:37
2. "Big Head" – 4:04
3. "Spot the Difference" – 4:17
4. "Pulling Lame" – 5:04
5. "Let's Make a Mystery" – 5:01
6. "Goodbye Grace" – 5:57
7. "Just Another Day" – 4:17
8. "Polaroid" – 4:47
9. "Political" – 4:34
10. "Ship Named Frank" – 4:28
11. "Far Too Canadian" – 6:33

"Political" was also released as a CD single, with the B-sides "Sad But True" and "Again and Again and Again".
