= Jr. Gone Wild =

Canadian country/punk rock band

- Origin: Edmonton, Alberta, Canada
- Genres: Cowpunk; Alternative country
- Years active: 1982–1995, 2013–2022, 2024–present
- Labels: Better Youth; Stony Plain
- Website: jrgonewild.com

Jr. Gone Wild is a Canadian country/punk rock band based in Edmonton, Alberta, Canada. The band toured for a number of years and recorded several albums in the 1980s and 1990s. After disbanding in 1995, the group began performing and recording again in 2013.

== History ==
The band was founded in Edmonton in 1982. Its original members were Mike McDonald, Tom Wolfe, Adele Wolfe, and Bill (Will) Pontez.

They played several gigs in Calgary including The Calgarian Hotel and The National Hotel but after only a few gigs broke up. McDonald eventually took the band and the name back to Edmonton, where he had previously fronted the band Joey Did and the Necrophiliacs, later known as Malibu Kens, (McDonald, Dobek, Scott Alloy, Dennis Lenarduzzi).

The band's next members were Mike McDonald, David Lawson, Dave "Dove" Brown, and Ed Dobek. They recorded their first album, Less Art More Pop, in 1986 on the BYO label.

Dobek and Lawson left the band in 1988. The band continued with McDonald and Brown, Steve Loree and Paul Paetz. The group went on a number of tours and experienced some personnel changes. The band won an Alberta Recording Industry Award for best rock band in 1994.

They recorded several albums, leading up to Simple Little Wish, which was released in early 1995. The band broke up later that year.

They were also associated with Edmonton/Montreal-based band Jerry Jerry and the Sons of Rhythm Orchestra, sharing several members at various junctures. According to a CBC Radio interview in the late 1980s, k.d. lang at one time played with both bands.

Jr. Gone Wild reformed in 2013 and played a reunion show with Mike McDonald, Dove Brown, Steve Loree and drummer Larry Shelast. The band got into legal difficulties after using the Alberta crest as part of their promotional material. The reunion gig was well received and the band started to perform live again, re-released their debut album Less Art More Pop! independently, and recorded a few new songs.

In 2015, NTT Films began filming a feature-length documentary that follows the history of the band, from their first gig through to the present recording sessions and live shows.

In 2015, Jr. Gone Wild performed at the Edmonton Music Awards gala.

In 2016, the song "Cosmos" from the album Less Art More Pop was recorded by Calgary band Napalmpom.

== Discography ==
- Less Art, More Pop! (1986)
- Folk You (The Guido Sessions) (1989)
- Too Dumb to Quit (1990)
- Pull The Goalie (1992)
- Simple Little Wish (1995)
- Live at the Hyperbole (1995) (with Three Dead Trolls in a Baggie)
- Still Got The Jacket (2021)
