= Beòlach =

Canadian instrumental folk music group

Beòlach is a Canadian traditional Celtic music group specialising in the fiddle and pipe music of their native Cape Breton Island, Nova Scotia, as well as Scotland and Ireland (amongst other influences). They have recorded and play both traditional and modern tunes. The group is perhaps most noted for their 2020 album All Hands, which was nominated for Traditional Folk Album of the Year at the Juno Awards of 2021, and won two Canadian Folk Music Awards—for Traditional Album of the Year and Instrumental Group of the Year—at the 16th Canadian Folk Music Awards.

== History ==
Beòlach was formed in 1998 by fiddlers Wendy MacIsaac (cousin of fiddler Ashley MacIsaac) and Màiri Rankin (of Rankin Family fame), pianist and keyboardist Mac Morin, guitarist Patrick Gillis and piper Ryan MacNeil. The group played their first live set at the Celtic Colours Festival, in Nova Scotia, that year.

The band released the albums Beòlach in 2001 and Variations in 2004, touring extensively to support the albums, before going on-hiatus as the individual members pursued other projects. Beòlach began performing as a group again in the late 2010s. Matt MacIsaac replaced Ryan MacNeil on pipes at that time; while Gillis has not rejoined the band as a full-time member, he has joined the group on stage at several concert and festival appearances, and provided some guitar accompaniment as a session musician for the recording of All Hands.

In addition to their Juno and CFMA nominations, the group received four East Coast Music Award nominations in 2021: Best Instrumental Album, Roots Traditional Album, Group Recording and Fans’ Choice Entertainer of the Year.
