= Save This House =

Studio album by Spirit of the West
- Released: February 20, 1990
- Recorded: 1989
- Genre: Folk, folk rock
- Length: 57:42
- Label: Warner Music Canada
- Producer: Danny Greenspoon

Spirit of the West chronology
| Old Material 1984-1986 (1989) | Save This House (1990) | Go Figure (1991) |

Professional ratings
Review scores
| Source | Rating |
|---|---|
| Allmusic | 2.5/5 stars |

Save This House is the fourth studio album by Canadian folk rock band Spirit of the West, released on February 20, 1990, by Warner Music Canada.

It was the band's first album for Warner Music Canada, and their first with Linda McRae. Although still a relatively traditional folk album, its release on a major label meant that it was the band's first album to expand their fan base significantly beyond the folk music scene. The album was certified platinum in Canada and was the band's mainstream commercial breakthrough.

The band toured Canada and Great Britain in support of this album. Their British tour was as a supporting act for The Wonder Stuff. Members of Spirit of the West appeared on that band's Welcome to the Cheap Seats EP.

== Songs ==
The album's title track, an energetically percussive environmental anthem, was written by Geoffrey Kelly and John Mann in fifteen minutes before the band were to perform a new song on a CBC program. Linda McRae has said that the song was written from the perspective that if everyone looked at the world as each person's individual house, then (we) would all take better care of it. The song was released as a single (at the band's request) and was a notable hit for the band on campus radio.

The album's best-known song is "Home for a Rest". In 2005, "Home for a Rest" was also named the 22nd greatest Canadian song of all time on CBC Radio One's 50 Tracks: The Canadian Version.

== CD track listing ==
1. "Save This House" – 2:53
2. "Home for a Rest" – 4:33
3. "Last to Know" – 6:24
4. "Roadside Attraction" – 3:03
5. "Dirty Pool" – 3:30
6. "Not Just a Train" – 4:18
7. "(Putting Up with) The Joneses" – 4:25
8. "Turned Out Lies" – 3:43
9. "Sentimental Side" – 4:06
10. "Water in the Well" – 4:03
11. "Wrecking Ball" – 3:39
12. "Loaded Minds" – 4:51
13. "Swingin' Single" – 4:55
14. "The Old Sod" – 3:19

== LP track listing ==
=== Side one ===
1. "Save This House" – 2:53
2. "Home for a Rest" – 4:33
3. "Last to Know" – 6:24
4. "Roadside Attraction" – 3:03
5. "Dirty Pool" – 3:30

=== Side two ===
1. "Not Just a Train" – 4:18
2. "(Putting Up With) The Joneses" – 4:25
3. "Wrecking Ball" – 3:39
4. "Swingin' Single" – 4:55
5. "The Old Sod" – 3:19
