= Home for a Rest =

Song by Spirit of the West

from the album Save This House
- Released: February 20, 1990
- Recorded: 1989
- Genre: Folk rock
- Length: 4:33
- Songwriters: John Mann; Geoffrey Kelly
- Producer: Danny Greenspoon

"Home for a Rest" is a song by Canadian folk rock band Spirit of the West from their fourth studio album Save This House, released in 1990. It is the band's signature song and is considered a classic of Canadian music.

Although the song received widespread radio and club airplay throughout the 1990s, it was never officially released as a single in its own right until 2014, when a limited-edition single was released for Record Store Day.

== Background and writing ==
Written by John Mann and Geoffrey Kelly in 1989 during one of the band's first tours of England, it was originally more of a poem than a full-fledged song. According to producer Danny Greenspoon, the band considered it still a work in progress, and had not brought it to the primary recording sessions for the album; rather, it was brought to Greenspoon's attention only as he was about to conclude work on the project and return home to Toronto. Recognizing the song's potential, he immediately worked with the band to resolve their uncertainties about its readiness, and finally recorded it as the last song of the sessions.

While originally intended to be a throwaway tune, it wound up on the album Save This House at the insistence of producer Danny Greenspoon.

Kelly in an interview with the Canadian Songwriters Hall of Fame:

It is to me still very strange that Canada has really latched on to the song, because the song is really about being in the U.K... We had no plans for it to be a single or even a video...despite all of that, it’s powered through, and it’s by far our most loved song.

== Content ==
The song tells of a drinking spree in London:

You'll have to excuse me, I'm not at my best
I've been gone for a week, I've been drunk since I left
These so-called vacations will soon be my death
I'm so sick from the drink, I need home for a rest.

British geographical references such as Euston Station, Charing Cross Road and Yorkshire appear in the lyrics. The later choruses switch the length of time that the narrator has been gone from a week to a month, and in some live performances changed from a month to a year. The song's musical arrangement incorporates the traditional reels "Castle Kelly", "Glass of Beer", and "Swallow's Tail".

== Music video ==
Despite not being released as a single in 1990, a music video was released, which was in rotation on MuchMusic and later available on YouTube.

== Reception ==
The Canadian Songwriters Hall of Fame called the song a "rollicking Irish-flavoured song that is played at celebrations from university parties to weddings," and widely adopted as a drinking song despite its cautionary lyrics. In 2018, the song was inducted into the Canadian Songwriters Hall of Fame.

== Live performances ==
"Home for a Rest" was always the final song played at the band's concert performances, excepting encores. A live performance of the song at the band's 2015 Massey Hall concert forms the climax of the 2016 documentary film Spirit Unforgettable; due to Mann's battle with early-onset Alzheimer's disease, he struggles with the lyrics at first but the entire audience begins singing along.

== Certifications ==
On January 16, 2019, the song was certified platinum in Canada.

Region	Certification	Certified units/sales
Canada (Music Canada)	Platinum	80,000^{‡}
^{‡} Sales+streaming figures based on certification alone.

== Popularity ==
The song was one of two Canadian songs (the other being "Do the Bearcat" by David Wilcox) to appear on the 1998 compilation album Frosh, alongside such party anthems as Iggy Pop's "Lust for Life", The Village People's "YMCA", Denis Leary's "Asshole", and Beastie Boys' "(You Gotta) Fight for Your Right (To Party!)".

In 1999, the song was named to CFNY's Top 1002 New Rock Songs of All Time, ranking 689th behind R.E.M.'s "Shiny Happy People" and ahead of Robert Palmer's "Looking for Clues". In 2007, CFNY named it No. 8 on their Top 102 Canadian New Rock Songs of All Time.

In 2005, "Home for a Rest" was named the 22nd greatest Canadian song of all time in a listener vote on the CBC Radio One series 50 Tracks: The Canadian Version.

The song is also frequently covered by other Canadian folk rock bands, including Mudmen and Enter the Haggis. Spirit of the West's original recording has also occasionally been misattributed to Great Big Sea on YouTube and in online lyrics databases.

A limited-edition single was released for the 2014 Record Store Day.

At a November 2017 fundraising benefit concert for Mann's medical care at Vancouver's Commodore Ballroom, the participants recorded a tribute version of the song onsite prior to the concert; participants included Alan Doyle, Jim Cuddy, Sarah McLachlan, Ed Robertson, Barney Bentall, Colin James, Shari Ulrich, and Jim Byrnes.

From 2005 to 2016, "Home for a Rest" was the fifth best-selling digitally downloaded 1990s song by a Canadian artist in Canada and the best-selling digitally downloaded 1990s song by a Canadian band in Canada.

In 2022, "Home for a Rest" was voted British Columbia's favourite song by a local artist in a Twitter bracket organised by the CBC's Justin McElroy, narrowly beating out "Call Me Maybe" by Carly Rae Jepsen in the final. Other finalists in the Top 5 were Nelly Furtado's "I'm Like a Bird", Raffi's "Baby Beluga" and Sarah McLachlan's "I Will Remember You".
