= Spirit of the West =

Canadian rock band (1983–2016)

- Spirit of the West at the Pacific National Exhibition, Vancouver 2008

Background information
- Origin: North Vancouver, British Columbia, Canada
- Genres: Folk rock, Celtic rock
- Years active: 1983–2016
- Labels: Stony Plain, Warner, MapleMusic, Rhino, Elektra
- Past members: John Mann; Geoffrey Kelly; Hugh McMillan; Vince Ditrich; Tobin Frank; Matthew Harder; J. Knutson; Linda McRae; Daniel Lapp
- Website: sotw.ca

Spirit of the West were a Canadian folk rock band from North Vancouver, active from 1983 to 2016. They were popular on the Canadian folk music scene in the 1980s before evolving a blend of hard rock, Britpop, and Celtic folk influences which made them one of Canada's most successful alternative rock acts in the 1990s.

== Early years ==
Geoffrey Kelly and J. Knutson had begun playing music together as a duo when Kelly's then-girlfriend Alison, at the time a theatre student, told them she had a classmate with a really great singing voice. That classmate, John Mann, joined Kelly and Knutson as a folk trio called Eavesdropper, and scored early gigs as an opening act for rockers such as Art Bergmann and Barney Bentall. Early on their set predominantly comprised covers of artists such as Bruce Cockburn, Eric Bogle, Richard Thompson, and Billy Bragg, with original compositions gradually introduced into their set.

After a gig on Vancouver Island was erroneously billed as "Eavesdroppings", the band opted to change its name to Spirit of the West, and independently released the album Spirit of the West in 1984 before signing to Stony Plain Records, a roots music label based in Edmonton, Alberta.

Stony Plain released Tripping Up the Stairs in 1986. Following that album Hugh McMillan joined the band and the band toured through 1987 as a quartet with Hugh on bass. In October 1987, Knutson left the band to join the Winnipeg based band Hart-Rouge and pursue a "solo" career.

1988's Labour Day spawned the popular single "Political" and consolidated the band as a significant draw on the folk festival circuit. The album also garnered the band its first Juno Award nomination, for Best Roots & Traditional Album at the Juno Awards of 1989.

After that album's tour, McMillan took a temporary hiatus from the band in December of 1988 for personal reasons and to pursue solo interests. He was replaced by Daniel Lapp and Linda McRae, but returned before the band's next album was recorded. When McMillan returned, Lapp left the band in June of 1989 due to his wife becoming pregnant, but McRae stayed on. (As a result, Lapp never actually appeared on a Spirit of the West recording. He pursued a solo career, however, releasing a number of albums of experimental jazz/folk/electronic fusion.)

On the strength of "Political", Warner Bros. Records signed the band in 1989, and Stony Plain released a compilation, Old Material 1984–1986, to close out their contract with the label.

In 1990, the band's major label debut, Save This House was released. The album track "Home for a Rest", which was considered a classic party anthem at universities across Canada was not officially released as a commercial or radio single, but became the band's signature song. (Despite its not being a single, a music video was released for the song.)

== Evolution ==
As part of their tour to support Save This House, the band toured England with The Wonder Stuff, and decided to bring in a drummer and experiment with a more rock-oriented sound — a need which became particularly acute after the bands played two shows on the same bill as Jane's Addiction. After recording some song demos with guest drummer Darrell Mayes of the Colin James band and then touring for part of 1990 with various session drummers, the band brought in Vince Ditrich, who appeared for the first time on the band's 1991 album Go Figure.

Although the album retained many of the band's folk influences, it was more hard rock than any of the band's previous efforts, and this proved controversial among the band's fans. The album included a rock rendition of "Political", and at one show in London, Ontario, the audience presented the band with a petition demanding that they play the original version of that song. Despite the controversies, however, it won them many new fans in the alternative rock scene.

The band received a Juno Award nomination for Most Promising Group at the Juno Awards of 1991.

MacRae also appeared on The Wonder Stuff's album Never Loved Elvis, and all of the members of both bands recorded a cover of the country standard "Will the Circle Be Unbroken" as a B-side for the Wonder Stuff's "Welcome to the Cheap Seats" single. Over the winter of 1992-93, the band undertook the Hollow Bodies tour, performing material in their older acoustic style.

In 1993, the band released their most successful album, Faithlift, and scored their biggest hit single, "And if Venice is Sinking". 1995's Two Headed, in turn, garnered significant airplay for the single "Tell Me What I Think", and the band garnered a Juno Award nomination for Group of the Year at the Juno Awards of 1995. However, the album was not as successful on the charts, or as critically hailed, as its predecessor.

In the summer of 1995, the band toured with The Tragically Hip as part of the Another Roadside Attraction festival.

Beginning in 1995, the band also performed a number of shows with symphony orchestras across Canada, premiering songs written for a planned symphony album with the Vancouver Symphony Orchestra. After recording two shows with the VSO on May 12 and May 13, 1995, they released the album Open Heart Symphony that year; the concert also aired on Bravo concurrently with the album's release.

At the end of 1996, McRae left the band amicably to pursue a solo career, performing her last show on New Year's Eve of that year. She released a solo country album in 1997, and then formed the alternative country band Cheerful Lonesome.

The remaining members recorded 1997's Weights and Measures as a four-piece at Martin Barre's studio in Devon, England, working with Barre and members of The Wonder Stuff, Capercaillie and Fairport Convention to round out the studio effort, and added Tobin Frank for their concert tour. In the same year, a studio version of the song "Kiss & Tell", which had previously been released only in its live form on Open Heart Symphony, appeared on the soundtrack to the film The Hanging Garden.

However, with the music industry's emphasis having shifted by this time away from alternative rock and back toward more mainstream pop-oriented performers, Warner Bros. put little effort into promoting the album, and dropped the band from their roster after the tour.

== Hiatus and revival ==
After Weights & Measures the band took a hiatus from recording and broad-scale national touring, although they continued to perform selected live dates on the summer folk festival circuit and in major concert markets such as Vancouver and Toronto. During the hiatus, Mann, Ditrich and Kelly all released solo albums, Mann pursued acting roles, McMillan worked as a session musician and producer for The Town Pants, and Kelly and Frank recorded with The Paperboys.

The band's first new album in seven years, Star Trails, was released on July 6, 2004, on MapleMusic Recordings.

In 2008, the band released a 25th anniversary compilation, Spirituality 1983-2008: The Consummate Compendium, on Rhino Records. The two-CD set includes 32 remastered tracks from throughout the band's career, including two new songs, "Winter's Now the Enemy" and "Another Happy New Year". Their official 25th anniversary concert, held at Vancouver's Commodore Ballroom on March 14, 2008, was recorded and broadcast by CBC Radio 2. Concurrently with the release of Spirituality, Rhino also released remastered editions of Faithlift and Open Heart Symphony.

In 2009, Spirit of the West opened for Great Big Sea on the "Fortune's Favour" tour, finishing in Victoria, British Columbia on March 26. On this tour, the final encore performances typically involved both bands performing together on various songs, including Spirit of the West's "Political" and Great Big Sea's "The Old Black Rum".

In 2010, Kelly, Ditrich and Frank joined Ashley MacIsaac and folk musician Matthew Harder in recording a charity single, "Dreams", to benefit Kwame Nkrumah-Acheampong, a skier from Ghana who was the first Ghanaian athlete ever to compete in the Winter Olympics. Nkrumah-Acheampong himself participated in the recording, playing traditional Ghanaian percussion. The single, credited to The Parallel Band, was released to iTunes on February 19, 2010. Concurrently, Mann was in Edmonton, starring in a stage production of Bruce Ruddell's rock musical Beyond Eden. In 2011, the full Spirit of the West lineup recorded and released another charity single, "Bulembu", to benefit the Bulembu orphanage and sustainable economic development project in Swaziland; the song also includes a vocal choir of children from Bulembu.

Kelly underwent surgery in early 2012 and was unable to perform for several weeks; Harder and Kendel Carson of The Paperboys substituted for him in several live shows during this period, including the band's traditional annual St. Patrick's Day show at the Commodore Ballroom. At the band's 2014 St. Patrick's Day show, they were inducted into the British Columbia Entertainment Hall of Fame.

== Conclusion ==
In September 2014, Mann announced that he had been diagnosed with early-onset Alzheimer's disease, but planned to continue performing with the band as long as he remained able to do so. In concession to Mann's illness, the band began performing with an iPad mounted near the microphone in case Mann had difficulty remembering the lyrics, while Harder joined full-time to take over Mann's duties on lead guitar. Weeks after the announcement, Mann performed a concert featuring his solo material and that of Spirit of the West, which was broadcast by CBC Television's Absolutely Canadian in July 2015 as "John Mann Here and Now".

The band's preparations for a 2015 concert at Massey Hall are profiled in Pete McCormack's documentary film Spirit Unforgettable.

In December 2015, the band announced that they would perform a three-night run at the Commodore Ballroom from April 15 to 17 as their final shows. Over the month before the final shows, the band undertook a small-scale final tour.

As Ditrich was also in poor health with kidney disease, he was not able to perform for the full duration of all three Commodore shows, and shared drum duties with Kris MacFarlane and Pat Steward. Kendel Carson, Paul Hyde, Jim Cuddy, Steven Page, Colin James, Andy Maize and Craig Northey also participated in the Commodore shows as guests.

The band remained informally active through private "Johnny Jams" as a form of music therapy for Mann, and Kelly communicated the hope that Mann would remain healthy enough for the band to play occasional brief reunion sets in the future. Following The Tragically Hip's announcement in May 2016 that singer Gord Downie had been diagnosed with brain cancer but would undertake a tour with the band in summer 2016, Kelly was interviewed by both CBC Radio One's Day 6 and Maclean's about his experiences performing with Spirit of the West under similar circumstances.

The band performed a reunion set at Spirit of Canada, a benefit concert for Alzheimer's awareness at the Commodore Ballroom on November 19, 2017. The concert's lineup included Odds, Barney Bentall, Dustin Bentall, Jim Byrnes, Kendel Carson, Jim Cuddy, Alan Doyle, Colin James, Sarah McLachlan, Ed Robertson, Shari Ulrich, and Spirit: The Next Generation, an act consisting of the band members' children. Before the show, the performing musicians participated in a group recording of the band's signature song "Home for a Rest" as a tribute to Mann.

Mann died on November 20, 2019.

== Discography ==
=== Albums ===
==== Studio albums ====
Title	Details	Peak chart positions	Certifications (sales threshold)
Title	Details	CAN	Certifications (sales threshold)
Spirit of the West	Release date: 1984; Label: Triniti Records; Formats: LP	—	
Tripping Up the Stairs	Release date: July 1986; Label: Stony Plain Records; Formats: LP, cassette	—	
Labour Day	Release date: January 2, 1988; Label: Stony Plain Records; Formats: LP, cassette	64	
Save This House	Release date: February 20, 1990; Label: Warner Music Canada; Formats: LP, cassette, CD	62	CAN: Platinum
Go Figure	Release date: June 25, 1991; Label: Warner Music Canada; Formats: LP, cassette, CD	45	CAN: Gold
Faithlift	Release date: September 28, 1993; Label: Warner Music Canada; Formats: LP, cassette, CD	27	CAN: Platinum
Two Headed	Release date: June 20, 1995; Label: Warner Music Canada; Formats: Cassette, CD	20	
Open Heart Symphony	Release date: May 21, 1996; Label: Warner Music Canada; Formats: CD	36	
Weights and Measures	Release date: September 30, 1997; Label: Warner Music Canada; Formats: CD	—	
Star Trails	Release date: July 6, 2004; Label: MapleMusic Recordings; Formats: CD	—	
"—" denotes releases that did not chart

==== Compilation albums ====
Title	Details	Peak chart positions
Title	Details	CAN
Old Material 1984–1986	Release date: November 1989; Label: Stony Plain Records; Formats: LP	—
Hit Parade	Release date: September 14, 1999; Label: Warner Music Canada; Formats: CD	—
Spirituality 1983–2008: The Consummate Compendium	Release date: July 15, 2008; Label: Rhino Records; Formats: CD	—
"—" denotes releases that did not chart

=== Singles ===
Year	Single	Peak chart positions				Certifications (sales thresholds)	Album
Year	Single	CAN	CAN AC	CAN Country	CAN Content (Cancon)	Certifications (sales thresholds)	Album
1986	"The Crawl"	—	—	—	—		Tripping Up the Stairs
1988	"Political"	—	—	—	31		Labour Day
1990	"Save This House"	85	—	—	—		Save This House
1991	"D for Democracy"	87	—	—	1		Go Figure
1991	"Political (Go Figure version)"	70	—	—	4		Go Figure
1992	"Spot the Difference"	—	—	—	9		Go Figure
1993	"And if Venice Is Sinking"	30	12	93	—		Faithlift
1994	"5 Free Minutes"	55	29	—	—		Faithlift
1994	"6th Floor"	—	—	—	3		Faithlift
1994	"Sadness Grows"	52	—	—	7		Faithlift
1995	"Is This Where I Come In"	—	28	—	6		Faithlift
1995	"Tell Me What I Think"	25	—	—	—		Two Headed
1996	"Williamson's Garage"	—	53	—	—		Open Heart Symphony
1997	"Soldier's Boy"	—	—	—	—		Weights and Measures
2004	"July"	—	—	—	—		Star Trails
2011	"Bulembu"	—	—	—	—		Non-album single
2014	"Home for a Rest"	—	—	—	—	CAN: Platinum	Save This House

=== Album appearances ===
- Island of Circles (1991): "Sunshine Superman"
- Back to the Garden (1992): "Coyote"
- Upfront! Canadians Live from Mountain Stage (1994): "Political"
- Due South: The Original Television Soundtrack (1996): "Bone of Contention"
- 20 Years of Stony Plain (1996): "Political"
- The Hanging Garden (1997): "Kiss and Tell"
- Frosh (1998): "Home for a Rest"

== Reception ==
- In 1999, CFNY-FM ranked "Political" No. 524, and "Home For a Rest" No. 689, in its "Top 1002 New Rock Songs of All Time" chart.
- In 2005, "Home for a Rest" was named the 22nd greatest Canadian song of all time on CBC Radio One's 50 Tracks: The Canadian Version.
- In 2007, "Home for a Rest" ranked No. 8 on CFNY's "Top 102 Canadian New Rock Songs of All Time" chart.
- "Save This House" is the theme song for Save Us from Our House, a combined relationship/renovation/reality TV show which aired in 2007 on the Canadian cable network W, and on HGTV in the U.S.
- In 2010, Spirit of the West were the recipients of the National Achievement Award at the annual SOCAN Awards in Toronto.
- In 2022, "Home for a Rest" was voted British Columbia's favourite song by a local artist, in a Twitter competition organized by local CBC reporter Justin McElroy, beating Carly Rae Jepsen's "Call Me Maybe".
