= Vince Ditrich =

Canadian rock musician (born 1963)

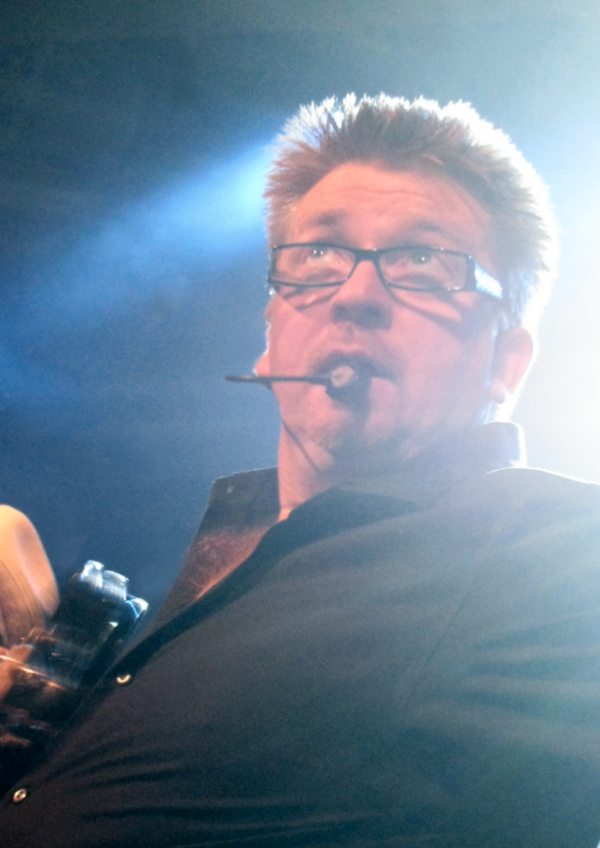
- Ditrich playing in Alberta, Canada, on July 17, 2010

Background information
- Born: Vince Richard Ditrich; April 4, 1963 (age 63)
- Genres: Rock and roll, Pop rock
- Occupation: Musician
- Instrument: Drums
- Formerly of: Spirit of the West

Vince Richard Ditrich (born April 4, 1963) is a Canadian rock musician, best known as the drummer and manager of the band Spirit of the West. Ditrich is also the author of three novels featuring fictional musician Tony Vicar.

== Early life ==
Ditrich grew up in Lethbridge, Alberta. He began playing drums as a child, and performed in his father's local band as a teenager.

== Career ==
Ditrich played drums with a variety of musicians, including pre-Odds bands with Doug Elliott and Steven Drake, Long John Baldry, and Paul Hyde. He went on tour in western Canada with Sue Medley in 1990, and also played with Mae Moore, Great Big Sea, and Doug and the Slugs.

In late 1989, he joined Spirit of the West, and performed on their 1991 album Go Figure. He has been a member of that band ever since. In 2001, Ditrich became the band's manager as well. He has also continued to record with other musicians as a session drummer, and released a solo album in 2002.

Spirit of the West frequently performed a rendition of "That's Amore" in concert, with Ditrich on lead vocals. Except for a live recording of that song on the band's 1999 greatest hits compilation Hit Parade, however, Ditrich did not normally perform lead vocals on the band's albums.

In 2005, Ditrich took on a management role for the bluegrass band House of Doc.

In 2010, Ditrich performed as part of the musical accompaniment for an original play, Debt the Musical, in British Columbia. In 2011, he produced part of Calum Hughes' album And That's Okay With Me at the Vancouver studio The Warehouse.

Until its disbandment in 2016, Ditrich continued to be the manager for Spirit of the West. By this time he had been suffering from kidney failure for several years, and missed some of the final performances.

Ditrich lived in Vancouver until 1993, but after the birth of his first son, he moved to Vancouver Island and still lives there with his wife, Marion, and their two sons.

In August 2021, Ditrich released his debut novel, The Liquor Vicar, the first of a three-part series published by Dundurn Press.

== Discography ==
- Supertonic (2002)
