= Hugh McMillan (musician) =

Canadian folk/jazz/rock musician

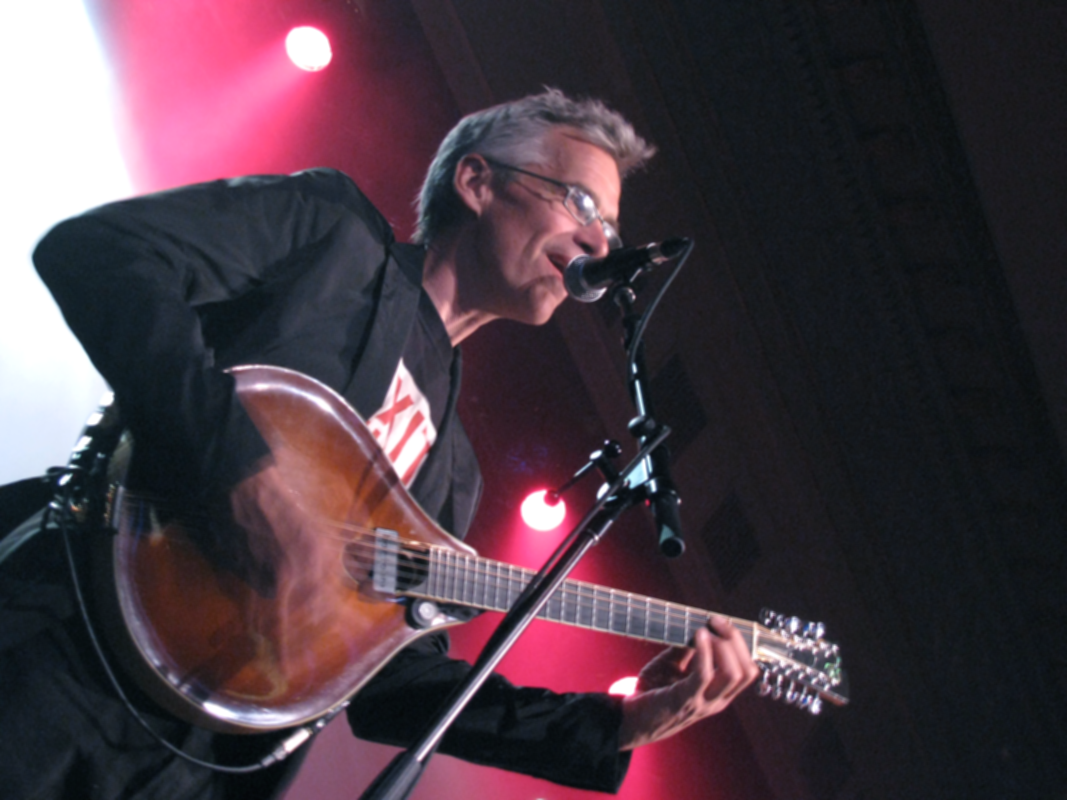
- McMillan on the mandolin

Background information
- Genres: Folk; jazz; rock
- Occupation: Multi-instrumentalist
- Instrument(s): Guitar, bass, cittern, mandolin, piano, keyboard, vocals

Hugh Richard Campbell McMillan is a Canadian folk/jazz/rock musician.

McMillan was a member of the folk rock band Spirit of the West, and is a multi-instrumentalist who has played guitars, bass, banjo, trombone, mandolin, bozouki, Chapman stick, piano, and keyboards on the band's albums. He has also produced albums for a number of Canadian folk bands, and has collaborated with Canadian artists including Oscar Lopez, James Keelaghan.
