= Stony Plain Records =

Canadian independent record label

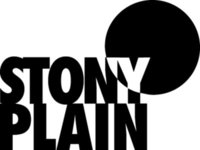
- Founded: 1976
- Founder: Holger Petersen, Alvin Jahns
- Distributor(s): Warner Music Canada; Alternative Distribution Alliance (US); Continental Record Services (Europe); Dixiefrog (Europe); The Orchard (digital)
- Genre: Blues, country, folk
- Country of origin: Canada
- Location: Waterdown (Hamilton), Ontario, Canada
- Official website: www.stonyplainrecords.com

Stony Plain Records is a Canadian independent record label, which specializes in roots music genres such as country, folk, and blues. The label has released more than 300 albums.

== History ==
Stony Plain was founded by Holger Petersen and Alvin Jahns in 1976. The label released their first album that year. Beginning in 1989, the label's releases were distributed by Warner Music Canada Petersen acted as the company's president for many years.

Stony Plain has previously licensed recordings from American labels Rounder Records, Sugar Hill Records, HighTone Records and Blind Pig Records for Canadian release. The label has also been the Canadian distributor for albums by American artists such as Steve Earle, Gillian Welch, and Emmylou Harris.

The label was still owned and operated by its founders Alvin Jahns and Holger Petersen. Petersen is also the author of two books of artist interviews and also hosts the weekly series Saturday Night Blues on CBC Radio One, Radio Two and SiriusXM 169 and Natch'l Blues on the CKUA Radio Network. In 2018, the company was sold to Linus Entertainment, and moved from Stony Plain, Alberta, to Waterdown, Ontario.

In 2016, Stony Plain celebrated its 40th anniversary by releasing a three-disc compilation album of highlights from its collection.

== Canadian roster ==
- Long John Baldry
- Kevin Breit
- Jim Byrnes
- Downchild Blues Band
- Gary Fjellgaard
- Amos Garrett
- Jeff Healey
- Tim Hus
- Sass Jordan
- Colin Linden
- Corb Lund
- Harry Manx
- Big Dave McLean
- MonkeyJunk
- Paul Reddick
- Spirit of the West
- Steve Strongman
- Ian Tyson
- Valdy
- Kenny "Blues Boss" Wayne
- Jr. Gone Wild
- David Wilcox

== International roster ==
- Billy Boy Arnold
- Asleep at the Wheel
- Eric Bibb
- Rory Block
- James Burton
- Rodney Crowell
- Ronnie Earl
- Steve Earle
- Amos Garrett
- Emmylou Harris
- Big Walter Horton
- Albert Lee
- Jay McShann
- Maria Muldaur
- New Guitar Summit (Jay Geils, Gerry Beaudoin, Duke Robillard)
- Doug Sahm
- Gene Taylor
- Joe Louis Walker
- Jimmy Witherspoon

== Awards ==
Recognition for the label and its artists includes 11 Juno Awards, six Grammy Award nominations, several Blues Music Awards, nine Canadian Country Music Awards for Label of the Year, more than 30 Maple Blues Awards and a number of Western Canada Music Awards. Stony Plain Records has earned several Gold and Platinum records for releases by artists as Ian Tyson, Corb Lund and various Best Of compilations.

The label was the recipient of The Blues Foundation's Keeping the Blues Alive Award in 2014.

== See also ==
- 20 Years of Stony Plain, compilation album released by Stony Plain in 1996
