= J. Knutson =

Canadian folk singer-songwriter (born 1957)

- Born: James Jay Knutson; 7 March 1957 (age 69)
- Genre: Contemporary folk
- Occupations: Singer; songwriter; producer
- Years active: 1980s–present
- Formerly of: Spirit of the West; Hart-Rouge
- Education: Capilano University; Simon Fraser University; British Columbia Institute of Technology
- Employer: Simon Fraser University

James Jay Knutson (born 7 March 1957) is a Canadian singer, songwriter, and producer. He is normally credited as simply J. Knutson.

== Education ==
Knutson attended Capilano University, Simon Fraser University, and the British Columbia Institute of Technology, graduating from the latter with a degree in broadcast journalism in 1981.

== Career ==
Knutson was a founding member of the contemporary folk band Spirit of the West. He toured and recorded three albums with the band until his departure in 1988.

Knutson worked as a member of the Montreal-based band Hart-Rouge, touring and recording four albums from 1988 to 1993. He also performed and recorded with Carmen Campagne, Connie Kaldor and the Winnipeg-based Nouveau Station Wagon. Starting in 2017, he worked, performed and recorded two albums with the Vancouver-based band Early Spirit.

He continued to perform and record as a solo artist, releasing nine solo albums between 1993 and 2023. Knutson has been involved in the recording of over 50 albums.

In 2003 and 2009, he produced, arranged and performed on albums by Canadian singer Pauline LeBel.

In 2007, J. Knutson was commissioned by the National Capital Commission to write, perform and record the song "1857 – Un Amour, Une Histoire", documenting the 150th anniversary of the founding of Ottawa as Canada's federal capital.

He has won West Coast Music awards and been part of five Juno Award–winning projects.

Knutson taught for 12 years at Simon Fraser University, instructing the music/physics course "Logarithm and Blues" with Dr. Mike Hayden.

He was also a musical and creative director for the North Shore Celtic Ensemble with Claude Giguere, having been so for over 20 years.

Knutson has worked as a producer for CBC Radio projects in Montreal, Ottawa and Vancouver, and for 5AD Radio in Australia.

== Discography ==
=== As solo artist ===
- The Last Family (1995)
- The Last Family Album (1996)
- Through These Windows (1998)
- Thesis (2001)
- 7 Seasons (2006)
- J. Just (2006)
- 1857 - Un Amour, Une Histoire (2007)
- Ravens Reach (2012)
- Reclamation (2013)
- The Rite of Balance (2017)
- Enter The Woods ( 2023)
- The Lightning Chain (2023)

=== As recording artist and producer ===
- Early Spirit
  - UnRelated (2018)
  - Hollow Tree (2023)
- North Shore and Coquitlam Celtic Ensemble
  - Flywheel (2010)
  - Troubadours (2012)
  - Rear View Mirror (2016)
  - Dusty Windowsills (2005)
  - Jigs Up (2001)
  - Kings’ Set (2003)
  - A Child's World (2005)
  - Where The Owl Nests (2008)
- Claude Giguère - Entre Lace (1998)
- Polly-Esther - Sandals and Platforms (1998)
- Josee LaJoie - Debut (1994), Au Depanneur (2007)
- Exit - Out of the Box (1997)
- Miranda Frigon - Strong Enough (2004)
- Pauline LeBel - La Tendresse (2003), Rescue Joy (2009)
- Draycott Swamp Devils - 2 Beer Buzz (2009), Stainless SteelHead (2015)

=== As recording artist ===
- Spirit of the West - Spirituality (Rhino/Warner 2008), Old Material (WEA/Stony Plain 1991), Tripping Up The Stairs (WEA 1987), Spirit of the West (Triniti 1985)
- Connie Kaldor - Out of the Blue (1994), Lullaby – Berceuse (Sony 1989)
- Hart-Rouge - Dernier Mois De L’Annee (MCA 1992), Inconditionnel (MCA 1992), Blue Blue Windows (1992), Hart Rouge (Sony 1990)
- Nouveau Station Wagon - Nouveau Station Wagon
- Image - Nouveau Monde (Ozmoz 1992)
- Carmen Campagne - Une Fête Pour Les Enfants (MCA 1993), Une Voix Pour Les Enfants (MCA 1990)
