= Linda McRae =

Canadian folk-roots-Americana musician

- Born: Linda Mae Humphries
- Origin: Vancouver, British Columbia, Canada
- Genres: Folk, roots, Americana
- Occupations: Singer, songwriter, instrumentalist
- Instruments: Clawhammer banjo, acoustic guitar, electric guitar, accordion, stomp box
- Years active: 1980–present
- Labels: Warner Music Canada, Stony Plain Records, Black Hen Music, 42RPM Borealis Records
- Members: Linda McRae
- Past members: Jesse Zubot, Steve Dawson, Darren Paris, Geoff Hicks, Scott McLeod, Ed Goodine, Jon Card, Charlie Hase, John Werner, Stephen Nikleva, Nova Devonie, Martin Walton
- Website: www.lindamcrae.com

Linda McRae is a Canadian folk-roots-Americana musician. A multi-instrumentalist (clawhammer banjo, acoustic and electric guitars, accordion, bass, and Porchboard stomp box) singer-songwriter, she is a former member of Spirit of the West. She has released eight albums, Flying Jenny, Cryin’ Out Loud, Carve It to the Heart, Rough Edges and Ragged Hearts, a career retrospective entitled 50 Shades of Red, Shadow Trails, Going to the Well and Cox and McRae live.

== Career ==
She earned two platinum and three gold records as a long-time member of Spirit of the West. She left the band to resume her solo career and has since released eight critically acclaimed recordings: Flying Jenny with producer Colin Linden (Bruce Cockburn, Bob Dylan), Cryin' Out Loud, producer Gurf Morlix (Lucinda Williams, Mary Gauthier), Carve It to the Heart with Marc L'Esperance and herself as producers, Rough Edges and Ragged Hearts again with Marc L'Esperance at the helm, a retrospective for Borealis Records called 50 Shades of Red, Shadow Trails produced by Steve Dawson and Cox and McRae Live produced by Doug Cox.

Her fourth release Rough Edges and Ragged Hearts she also produced with L'Esperance and featured performers including the Sojourners, Doug Cox, Gurf Morlix, Ray Bonneville, and Samantha Parton (of Be Good Tanyas). Charting No. 1 at CKUA, No. 4 Top Canadian Album, and Nos. 1 and 2 Top Canadian Songs ("Rough Edges & Ragged Hearts" and "Be Your Own Light") and No. 8 Top Canadian Artists on the Folk DJs list, the recording also earned five-star reviews in No Depression and Rock Star Weekly, and 4.5 stars in Penguin Eggs. As of November 2013, it's also been on the Roots Music Report charts for 50 weeks straight.

McRae's song "Burning Bridges" was also included on the Skydiggers summer 2013 CD entitled No. 1 Northern which included songs by Canadian artists Gordon Lightfoot, Ron Sexsmith, and Neil Young. Montreal Gazette, Metro Winnipeg, and the Nova Scotia Herald included her as among these Canadian "greats". Other co-recordings and performances include those with Bruce Cockburn, The Wonder Stuff, Neko Case, Alejandro Escovedo, and Ray Waylie Hubbard, and another with Gurf Morlix.

Recent performances include Plainsong Festival in Nebraska, Yukon Arts Centre, Vancouver Island Music Festival in British Columbia; South Country Fair in Alberta; Barbican Theatre, London; Maverick Festival, UK; the Bluebird Café, Nashville, Tennessee; and New Folsom Prison, California's infamous maximum-security prison where she performed and facilitated writing workshops for the inmates. These workshops lead to the creation of her Express Yourself Writing Workshops currently being presented in detox centres, alternative schools, and youth and adult correctional facilities across North America.

McRae has partnered with the following festivals to continue to present her workshop as part of their community outreach programs: Plainsong Festival (USA), South Country Fair (Canada), Coldsnap Festival (Canada), Hamburg Music Fest (USA), Vancouver Island Music Fest (Canada), Youth Rehabilitation and Treatment Center (USA), Folk Alliance International (USA), Bread and Roses (USA).

== Discography ==
=== As self ===
- Cox and McRae, 2023
- Linda McRae, Going to the Well, October 2019
- Linda McRae, Shadow Trails, September 2015
- Linda McRae, 50 Shades of Red, 2014
- Kenny Butterill, Troubadour Tales, 2014
- M.C. Hansen, He Was A Young Father (recorded in Whitehorse, Yukon in 2013)
- Linda McRae Live, (recorded at The Sportsmentʼs Tavern, Buffalo, New York, 2013)
- Linda McRae, Rough Edges & Ragged Hearts, 2012
- Loretta Hagen, Mud and Stone, 2011
- Jason Eklund, Jason Eklund, 2009
- Paul Hyde, Love & the Great Depression, 2009
- Joanne Mackell, Brand New Lonesome, 2008
- Linda McRae, Carve It to the Heart, 2007
- The Boomchix, Surprise, Surprise, 2007
- Rodney DeCroo, War Torn Man, 2006
- The Knotty Pines, The Fabulous Sounds, 2005
- Linda McRae, Escovedo 101, Compilation, 2004
- The Turaeward Family, Deep Rooted Beefs, 2004
- Rodney DeCroo, Rodney DeCroo and the Killers, 2004
- Gurf Morlix, Cut'N Shoot, 2004
- Eric Westbury, Burnt Tongues and Blue Truths, 2004
- Linda McRae, Cryin' Out Loud, 2004
- Leslie Alexander, Savage Country, 2003
- John Guliak, The Black Monk, 2002
- Women & Songs 6, Compilation, 2002
- Jeff Gibbons, Love Tattoos, 2001
- Neko Case, Furnace Room Lullaby, 2000
- Jim Whitford, Poison in the Well, 2000
- JT King, Ruby River, 2000
- Nanaimo 8:38 Saturday Morning, Bob Bossin, 1999
- Girls With Guitars, Volume 1, 1999
- Bruce Cockburn, Where Have All the Flowers Gone, 1998
- Linda McRae, Flying Jenny, 1997
- Spirit of the West, Open Heart Symphony Live with the VSO, 1996
- Spirit of the West, Two-Headed, 1995
- The Waltons, Cock's Crow, 1995
- Spirit of the West, Upfront! Canadians Live On Stage Various Artists, 1994
- Spirit of the West, Faithlift, 1993
- The Wonder Stuff, Will The Circle Be Unbroken, 1992
- The Wonder Stuff, Welcome to the Cheap Seats, 1992
- Spirit of the West, The Hanging Garden Joni Mitchell Compilation, 1997
- Spirit of the West, Go Figure, 1991
- Island of Circles, Donovan Compilation, 1991
- Spirit of the West, Collected Works Compilation, 1991
- Spirit of the West, Save This House, 1990
- Terminal City, CITR Tapeathon, 1988
- Terminal City, Live, 1987
- Easy Money, Standing in Your Shadow, 1981
- Easy Money, Getting Lost, 1981

=== As part of Spirit of the West ===
- Open Heart Symphony Live with the Vancouver Symphony Orchestra, 1996
- Two-Headed, 1995
- Upfront! Canadians Live On Stage Various Artists, 1994
- Faithlift, 1993
- The Hanging Garden, 1997
- Go Figure, 1991
- Collected Works compilation, 1991
- Save This House, 1990
