= Geoffrey Kelly =

Canadian rock musician (born 1956)

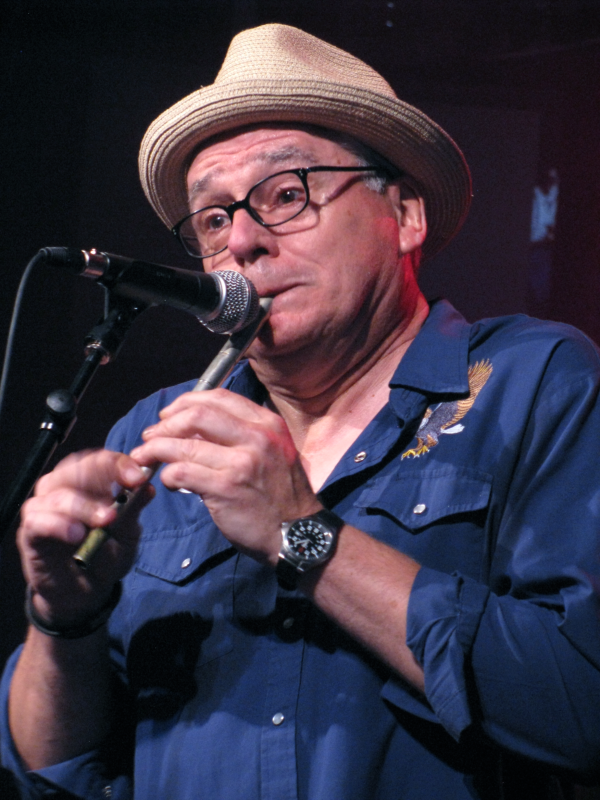
Kelly playing a penny whistle in 2010

Geoffrey Kelly (born October 23, 1956, in Dumfries, Scotland) is a Canadian rock musician. He played guitars, flutes and bodhrán for the folk rock band Spirit of the West, for whom he was also the lead vocalist on some songs: Geoffrey Kelly and John Mann were the band's primary songwriters and founders. They were often referred to as the "Glummer Twins". Their partnership endured through the years until the final 3 SOTW shows at the beloved Commodore Ballroom in April 2016. The Spirit of Canada shows took place at the Commodore the following year with an all star cast of Canada's finest.

Kelly is also a full-time member of The Paperboys, Kelly released the solo album Gringo Star in 2002 recorded at home studio Basecamp. He also tours internationally, and across Canada with The Irish Rovers. He has recorded on all their albums since the year 2000, and even appears on the Hard Stuff album from 1989. Kelly also tours with the Cariboo Express. Geoffrey has recorded with many artists including Alan Doyle, Paul Hyde, Odds, Barney Bentall, Ashley MacIsaac, The Wonder Stuff, The Town Pants, Early Spirit, Pat Chessell and many others.

His most recent recorded work is the album RanchWriters (2021), in partnership with longtime friend Barney Bentall. RanchWriters is an instrumental album centered around 2 acoustic guitars with additional tracks contributed by some of the finest musicians from Western Canada and beyond. Including dear friend, former Paperboy and honorary Spirit, Kendel Carson.

An upcoming Geoffrey Kelly solo album has also been completed with hopes of a fall 2022 release or spring of 2023.

Kelly resides in North Vancouver, British Columbia, Canada, with his family, wife Alison, son Ben, and daughter Maeve.

== Discography ==
- Gringo Star (2002)
- RanchWriters (2021) With Barney Bentall
