= Juno Award for Roots & Traditional Album of the Year – Group =

Canadian music award

The Juno Award for Roots & Traditional Album of the Year – Group was presented annually at Canada's Juno Awards to honour the best album of the year in the roots and/or traditional music genres. The award was first presented in 1996 under the name Best Roots & Traditional Album - Group, and adopted its current name in 2003. Prior to 1996, the Junos presented only a single award in the category, inclusive of both groups and solo artists, under the name Best Roots & Traditional Album.

Beginning with the 2016 ceremony, two new awards categories (Contemporary Roots Album of the Year and Traditional Roots Album of the Year) were introduced to "ensure two genres of music are not competing against each other in the same category".

== Winners ==
=== Best Roots & Traditional Album - Group (1996 - 2002) ===
Year	Winner(s)	Album	Nominees	Ref.
1996	The Irish Descendants	Gypsies & Lovers	Great Big Sea, Up; The Paperboys, Late As Usual; Orealis, Night Visions; The Wyrd Sisters, Inside the Dreaming	
1997	Kate & Anna McGarrigle	Matapédia	Blackie and the Rodeo Kings, High or Hurtin'; La Bottine Souriante, En Spectacle; Bill Bourne and Shannon Johnson, Victory Train; Rawlins Cross, Living River	
1998	The Paperboys	Molinos	Great Big Sea, Play; James Keelaghan and Oscar Lopez, Compadres; Leahy, Leahy; Wyrd Sisters, Raw Voice	
1999	Kate & Anna McGarrigle	The McGarrigle Hour	Bourque, Bernard et Lepage, Matapat; Heartbreak Hill, Heartbreak Hill; Puirt a Baroque, Return of the Wanderer; Zubot and Dawson, Strang	
2000	Blackie and the Rodeo Kings	Kings of Love	Barachois, Encore!; La Bottine Souriante, Xième; Great Big Sea, Turn; Scruj MacDuhk, The Road to Canso	
2001	Tri-Continental	Tri-Continental	Barra MacNeils, Racket in the Attic; The Paperboys, Postcards; La Volée d'Castors, VDC; Zubot and Dawson, Tractor Parts: Further Adventures in Strang	
2002	La Bottine Souriante	Cordial	The Brothers Cosmoline, Songs of Work & Freedom; Matapat, Petit fou; Undertakin' Daddies, Post Atomic Hillbilly; The Wyrd Sisters, Sin & Other Salvations	

=== Roots & Traditional Album of the Year: Group (2003 - 2015) ===
Year	Winner(s)	Album	Nominees	Ref.
2003	Zubot and Dawson	Chicken Scratch	The Bill Hilly Band, All Day Every Day; The Corb Lund Band, Five Dollar Bill; The Duhks, Your Daughters and Your Sons; John Reischman and the Jaybirds, Field Guide	
2004	Le Vent du Nord	Maudite Moisson	Blackie and the Rodeo Kings, BARK; La Bottine Souriante, J'ai jamais tant ri; Creaking Tree String Quartet, The Creaking Tree String Quartet; Pierre Schryer Band, Blue Drag	
2005	The Wailin' Jennys	40 Days	The Bills, Let Em Run; Leahy, In All Things; Nathan, Jimson Weed; La Volée d'Castors, Migration	
2006	The Duhks	The Duhks	Elliott Brood, Ambassador; Genticorum, Malins plaisirs; Great Big Sea, The Hard and the Easy; Sexsmith and Kerr, Destination Unknown	
2007	The McDades	Bloom	Be Good Tanyas, Hello Love; Blackie and the Rodeo Kings, Let's Frolic; The Dukhs, Migrations; The Wailin' Jennys, Firecracker	
2008	Nathan	Key Principles	James Keelaghan and Oscar Lopez, ¿Buddy, Where You Been?; Harry Manx and Kevin Breit, In Good We Trust; Ellen McIlwaine with Cassius Khan, Mystic Bridge; John Reischman and the Jaybirds, Stellar Jays; The Sadies, New Seasons	
2009	Chic Gamine	Chic Gamine	The Duhks, Fast Paced World; Elliott Brood, Mountain Meadows; NQ Arbuckle, XOK; Twilight Hotel, Highway Prayer	
2010	The Good Lovelies	The Good Lovelies	Annie Lou, Annie Lou; Great Lake Swimmers, Lost Channels; Madison Violet, No Fool for Trying; Carolyn Mark and NQ Arbuckle, Let's Just Stay Here	
2011	Le Vent du Nord	La part du feu	Chic Gamine, City City; Creaking Tree String Quartet, Sundogs; Dala, Girls from the North Country- Dala Live in Concert; The Marigolds, That's the State I'm In	
2012	The Wailin' Jennys	Bright Morning Stars	The Deep Dark Woods, The Place I Left Behind; The Good Lovelies, Let the Rain Fall; The Once, Row Upon Row of the People They Know; Twilight Hotel, When the Wolves Go Blind	
2013	Elliott Brood	Days Into Years	Great Lake Swimmers, New Wild Everywhere; The Strumbellas, My Father and the Hunter; Le Vent du Nord, Tromper le temps; The Wooden Sky, Every Child a Daughter, Every Moon a Sun	
2014	The Strumbellas	We Still Move on Dance Floors	Lee Harvey Osmond, The Folk Sinner; Little Miss Higgins & The Winnipeg Five, Bison Ranch Recording Sessions; The Devin Cuddy Band, Volume One; The Wilderness of Manitoba, Island of Echoes	
2015	The Bros. Landreth	Let It Lie	Blackie and the Rodeo Kings, South; The Deep Dark Woods, Jubilee; Elliott Brood, Work and Love; The Once, Departures	
