= Juno Award for Best Roots and Traditional Album =

Canadian music award

The Juno Award for Best Roots and Traditional Album was an annual award category, presented by the Juno Awards from 1989 to 1995 to honour achievements in roots music.

The award was discontinued after 1995, when it was split into distinct categories for Juno Award for Roots & Traditional Album of the Year – Solo and Juno Award for Roots & Traditional Album of the Year – Group.

== Winners and nominees ==
Year	Winner(s)	Album	Nominees	Ref.
1989	Amos Garrett, Doug Sahm and Gene Taylor	The Return of the Formerly Brothers	Downchild Blues Band, Bop 'Til I Drop; King Biscuit Boy, King Biscuit Boy aka Richard Newell; Murray McLauchlan, Swinging on a Star; Spirit of the West, Labour Day	
1990	La Bottine Souriante	Je voudrais changer d'chapeau	Amos Garrett, I Make My Home in Shoes; Montreal Jubilation Gospel Choir, Jubilation II; Sylvia Tyson, You Were On My Mind; Jesse Winchester, Humor Me	
1991	Bill Bourne and Alan MacLeod	Dance & Celebrate	Figgy Duff, Weather Out the Storm; Grievous Angels, One Job Town; Jackson Delta, Acoustic Blues; Montreal Jubilation Gospel Choir, Jubilation III - Glory Train	
1992	Various Artists	Saturday Night Blues	Bruce Cockburn, Nothing But a Burning Light; Kashtin, Innu; The Rankin Family, Fare Thee Well Love	
1992	Loreena McKennitt	The Visit	Bruce Cockburn, Nothing But a Burning Light; Kashtin, Innu; The Rankin Family, Fare Thee Well Love	
1993	La Bottine Souriante	Jusqu'aux p'tites heures	Bill Bourne and Alan MacLeod, Moonlight Dancers; Jackson Delta, I Was Just Thinking That; Daniel Koulack, Clawhammer Your Way to the Top; Ken Whiteley, Jackie Washington and Mose Scarlett, Where the Old Friends Meet	
1994	James Keelaghan	My Skies	Bruce Cockburn, Christmas; Garnet Rogers, At a High Window; Stan Rogers, Home in Halifax; Oliver Schroer, Jigzup	
1995	Loreena McKennitt	The Mask and Mirror	La Bottine Souriante, La Mistrine; Stephen Fearing, The Assassin's Apprentice; Ferron, Driver; Joni Mitchell, Turbulent Indigo	
