= Les Épousailles =

Studio album by La Bottine Souriante
- Released: 1980
- Recorded: 1980
- Genre: Folk
- Label: Les Productions Mille-Pattes
- Producer: La Bottine Souriante

La Bottine Souriante chronology
Y'a ben du changement (1978)	Les Épousailles (1980)	Chic 'n Swell (1982)

Les Épousailles (French for: The Wedding) is a 1980 album by La Bottine Souriante.

The album was rated 3 out of 5 stars by AllMusic.

== Track listing ==
1. "Les p'tits plaisirs de Basile" (Basil's Little Pleasures)
2. "Le Réel des deux Lisa|Le Réel du cordonnier" (Two Lisas Reel/Shoemaker's Reel)
3. "Les Plaisirs de la table" (Pleasures of the Table)
4. "La Chanson des pommes de terre" (Potato Song)
5. "Le Réel du pendu" (Hanged Man’s Reel)
6. "La Nuit de noces" (Wedding Night)
7. "La Confession d'un moribond" (Confession of a Dying Man)
8. "La Chanson d'un embêté" (Song of a Worrier)
9. "La Chanson de la langue française" (Song of the French Language)
10. "Mon père marier-moi donc" (Father Let Me Marry)
