= Chic 'n Swell =

Studio album by La Bottine Souriante
- Released: 1983
- Recorded: December 14–20, 1982
- Studio: Studio PSM
- Genre: Folk
- Label: Les Productions Mille-Pattes
- Producer: La Bottine Souriante

La Bottine Souriante chronology
| Les Épousailles (1980) | Chic 'n Swell (1983) | La Traversée de l'Atlantique (1986) |

Chic 'n Swell is a 1982 album by La Bottine Souriante.

== Track listing ==
1. "Le Batteux" (The Threshing Mill), La grande gigue simple – 2:58
2. "La Tapinie" (The Log Drive), Le reel des voyageurs – 3:50
3. "Sur le chemin de mont" (On the Mountain Road) – 3:05
4. "Le Rossignol sauvage" (The Wild Nightingale) – 3:40
5. "Nos braves habitants" (Our Brave Habitants) – 3:30
6. "La Danse des foins" (The Hay Dance) – 2:45
7. "Le Bal chez Ti-Guy" (Ti-Guy's Party) – 2:45
8. "Les Robineux" (The Beggars) 1:50
9. "Les Patins de Pauline" (Pauline's Skates) Le petit bûcheux – 3:15
10. "La Ziguezon" (The Ziguezon) – 3:38
11. "Le Tablier du maçon" (The Builder's Apron), Le reel à Rémi – 3:25
12. "Les Trois capitaines" (The Three Captains) – 3:00

== Personnel ==
=== La Bottine Souriante ===
- André Marchand: Vocals, guitars, piano
- Mario Forest: Harmonica, vocals
- Yves Lambert: Acoustic guitars, accordion and harmonica
- Martin Racine: Vocals, violin, mandolin

=== Additional personnel ===
- Lisa Ornstein: Violin (tracks 4 and 6), piano (track 5)
