= La Traversée de l'Atlantique =

Studio album by La Bottine Souriante
- Released: 1986
- Recorded: 1986
- Genre: Folk
- Label: Les Productions Mille-Pattes
- Producer: La Bottine Souriante

La Bottine Souriante chronology
Chic 'n Swell (1982)	La Traversée de l'Atlantique (1986)	Tout comme au jour de l'An (1987)

La Traversée de l'Atlantique (Atlantic Crossing) is a 1986 album by La Bottine Souriante.

The album was rated 4.5 out of 5 stars by AllMusic.

== Track listing ==
1. "Sur le pont d'Avignon", – 3:18
2. "Le meunier et la jeune fille", – 3:15
3. "Le reel des vieux/Le reel à Jules Verret", – 2:57
4. "J'aurai le vin/Le reel du petit cheval de bois", – 4:38
5. "La belle ennuitée", – 2:00
6. "La traversée de l'Atlantique/Le set carré à Pitou Boudreault", – 2:49
7. "Le lac à Beauce / Le reel St-Jean", – 3:45
8. "La Madelon", – 2:33
9. "Le reel du mal de dos/Le reel à Jean-Marie Verret", – 2:34
10. "La Chanson des menteries", – 4:18
11. "Hommage à Philippe Bruneau / La Valse d'hiver", – 4:18
12. "La chanson des pompiers", – 2:12

== Personnel ==
- André Marchand: guitar, vocals, other [foot]
- Martin Racine: violin, vocals
- Bernard Simard: vocals, guitar
- Yves Lambert: vocals, harmonica, accordion
