= La Mistrine =

Studio album by La Bottine Souriante
- Released: 1994
- Recorded: 1994
- Genre: Folk
- Length: 43:30
- Label: Les Productions Mille-Pattes
- Producer: La Bottine Souriante

La Bottine Souriante chronology
Jusqu'aux p'tites heures (1992)	La Mistrine (1994)	En spectacle (1996)

La Mistrine is an album by La Bottine Souriante, released in 1994. It contains the popular song "Martin de la Chasse-galerie", which tells of a famous Quebec legend, and is performed in cooperation with Michel Rivard.

== Track listing ==
1. "Le Reel des Soucoupes Volantes"
2. "Ici-bas sur Terre"
3. "Martin de la Chasse"-galerie
4. "La Mistrine"
5. "Le Reel de la Main Blanche"
6. "La Tourtière"
7. "Le Reel Irlandais or Bees Wax, Skin Sheep"
8. "Christophe"
9. "La Complainte du Folkloriste"
10. "Le Rap à Ti-Pétang"
11. "Reel de la Sauvagine"
12. "Dans nos Vieilles Maisons"

== Credits ==
- Musical direction: Jean Fréchette
- Engineered and mixed by Paul Pagé
- Produced by Paul Pagé, Réjean Archambault, Yves Lambert, Jean Fréchette
- Production coordinators: Céline Michaud and François Boudrias
- Assistant engineer: Isabelle Larin
- Recordings and mix: Studio St-Charles, Longueuil (Canada)
- Mastered at SNB Mastering by Bill Kipper
- Sleeve designer and graphics: Sylvain Beauséjour
- Photography: François Boudrias
- Typewriting: Sylvie Tourangeau
