= Y'a ben du changement =

Studio album by La Bottine Souriante
- Released: 1978
- Recorded: 1978
- Genre: Folk
- Length: 41:36
- Label: Les Productions Mille-Pattes
- Producer: La Bottine Souriante

La Bottine Souriante chronology
| Y'a ben du changement (1978) | Les Épousailles (1980) |

Y'a ben du changement (There's a Lot of Change) is a 1978 album by La Bottine Souriante.

== Track listing ==
1. "Sur la montagne du loup" (On Wolf Mountain), – 4:10
2. "Trinque l'amourette" (Toast to a Love Affair), – 3:51
3. "La ronfleuse Gobeil" (The Snoring Gobeil (Note: Gobeil is a French language surname.), – 4:01
4. "Pinci-Pincette", – 4:46
5. "Y'a ben du changement" (There's a Lot of Change), – 4:17
6. "2033 (Le Manifeste d'un vieux chasseur d'oïes)" (2033 [Manifesto of an Old Goose Hunter]), – 4:10
7. "La Banqueroute" (Bankruptcy), – 3:30
8. "Réel des ouvriers" (Workers' Reel), – 2:41
9. "L'Ivrogne" (The Drunkard), – 3:42
10. "Sur la grand côte" (On the Great Hill), – 1:51
11. "La Tuque rouge" (The Red Tuque), – 2:59
12. "Le Réel à bouche acadien" (Acadian Mouth Reel), – 1:38
