= Elliott Brood =

Canadian band

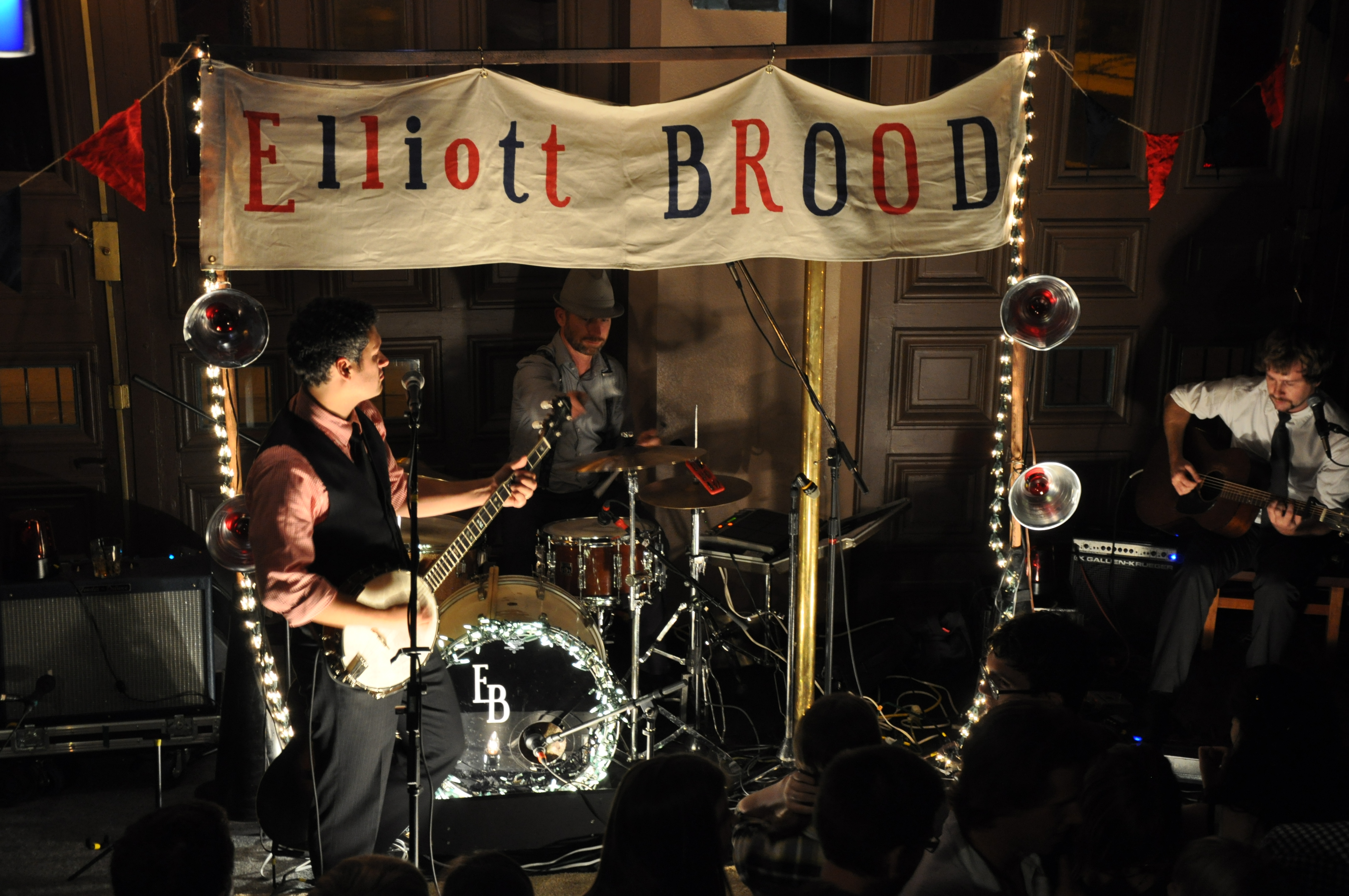
- Elliott Brood performing in 2008

Background information
- Origin: Toronto, Ontario, Canada
- Genres: Alternative country, folk, bluegrass
- Years active: 2002–present
- Labels: Weewerk; Six Shooter; Paper Bag Records
- Members: Mark Sasso; Casey Laforet; Stephen Pitkin
- Website: elliottbrood.com

Elliott Brood (often stylized as Elliott BROOD) is a three-piece Canadian alternative country band formed in Toronto in 2002. It consists of Mark Sasso on lead vocals, guitar, banjo, ukulele, harmonica and kazoo, Casey Laforet on guitar, lead vocals, backing vocals, bass pedals, keys and ukulele, and Stephen Pitkin on percussion, sampler and backing vocals. The band's style has been categorized as "death country", "frontier rock" or "revival music".

== History ==
Mark Sasso and Casey Laforet grew up together in Windsor, and began playing as a band after moving to Toronto following high school. They played their first show in 2002 with two other musicians at Toronto club Holy Joes.

Although the two other musicians dropped out of the band's line-up after a few shows, Sasso and Laforet continued as a duo, hooking up with producer Stephen Pitkin to record their first EP, Tin Type, which was released in 2004. Tin Type was recorded over two days in Sasso's living room.

The EP was released in January 2004 by weewerk Records, and came packaged in a brown paper bag containing a handmade photobook done in the style of the American Old West (all of the band's albums are designed by Sasso, who is also a graphic artist).

Pitkin recorded and co-produced Tin Type, but did not officially become a band member until the band released its first LP, Ambassador, on Six Shooter Records in 2005.

Much of Ambassador was recorded by Joe Dunphy in a former abattoir in the Toronto Public Stock Yards, which had been converted to a recording studio called "Monumental Sound". The album was named for the Ambassador Bridge which connects Windsor with Detroit.

The band released its second full-length album, Mountain Meadows, in 2008. Mountain Meadows was coproduced with John Critchley at Green Door Studio in Toronto, where the album was also mixed. In keeping with the band's fondness for incorporating unique room tones within the recording, a number of locations across Canada were selected, including Healey Lake Lodge in MacTier, Wayne Town Hall in Wayne, Mount Robson Lodge in Valemount, and Halla Music in Toronto, as well as Casey Laforet's kitchen and Mark's garage. The album was shortlisted for the 2009 Polaris Music Prize.

Until June 2008, Pitkin's contribution to Elliott Brood was embellished by his use of a Samsonite "Silhouette" suitcase instead of a conventional bass drum. After pummelling through several cases at inopportune times, he decided to put the idea to rest. This came after a particularly destructive encore on a double bill with United Steel Workers of Montreal at Le Divan Orange club in Montreal. The destroyed case from that show now resides as an art installation on the wall of the Moho Tavern in Peterborough.

In 2010, the band wrote the score for Adriana Maggs' film Grown Up Movie Star. Their song "West End Sky" garnered a Genie Award nomination for Achievement in Music: Original Song.

Paper Bag Records became the band's new record label in June 2011, and released their new album Days Into Years on September 27. Much of the album's content was inspired by a visit to the Étaples Military Cemetery during a tour through France. Days Into Years spent eight consecutive weeks in the top 10 on the National Campus and Community Radio Association's !earshot radio charts, peaking at No. 1 in the folk/roots/blues category, and at No. 5 overall.

After a number of years in Toronto, two members of the band are now based in Hamilton.

== Tours ==
Elliott Brood has toured extensively throughout Canada as well as internationally. They have opened for acts including Wilco, War On Drugs, The Head and the Heart, Blue Rodeo, The Black Crowes, Corb Lund, Do Make Say Think, and The Sadies. They also headlined the first "Wood, Wires, and Whisky" tour across Canada in fall 2007, with The Acorn, Sunparlour Players, and Plants and Animals. Elliott Brood has also played at major music festivals such as BBK Festival Bilbao Spain (2014), The Sasquatch Festival (2013), Pickathon in Portland, Oregon (2011/2009), the Olympic Village in Whistler for the 2010 Winter Olympics in British Columbia, and North Country Fair in 2004 in Driftpile, Alberta.

== Discography ==
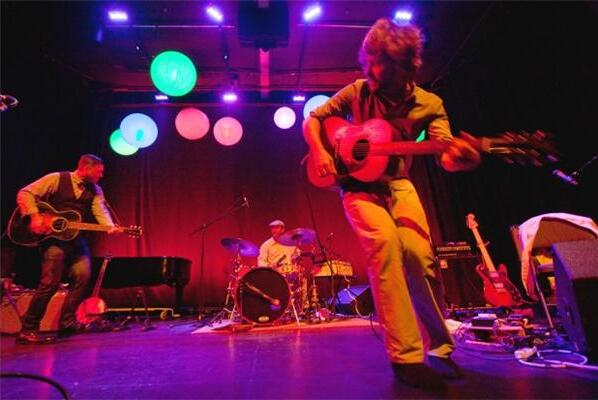
Elliott Brood at The Broadway Theatre Saskatoon 2012

=== Albums and EPs ===
- 2004: Tin Type
- 2005: Ambassador
- 2008: Mountain Meadows
- 2011: Northern Companion (7" vinyl)
- 2011: Days Into Years
- 2012: iTunes Live from Montreal
- 2013: Tin Type II
- 2014: Work and Love
- 2017: Ghost Gardens
- 2020: Keeper
- 2023: Town
- 2024: Country

=== Singles ===
- 2005: "Second Son"
- 2005: "The Bridge"
- 2008: "The Valley Town"
- 2008: "Write It All Down For You"
- 2011: "Northern Air"
- 2011: "If I get Old"
- 2014: "Tired"
- 2017: "'Til the Sun Comes Up Again"

=== Videos ===
- 2004: "Cadillac Dust" – Tin Type
- 2005: "Second Son" – Ambassador
- 2005: "Only at Home" – Tin Type
- 2005: "The Bridge" – Ambassador
- 2008: "Oh, Alberta" – Tin Type
- 2008: "Fingers and Tongues" – Mountain Meadows
- 2012: "Lindsay" – "Days Into Years"

=== DVD ===
- 2007: Backwood Sessions

Includes music videos (The Bridge, Second Son), Karaoke (Oh, Alberta), unreleased song "Gentle Temper" and tour footage from 2004 (Running time: 20 Minutes)

== Awards ==
- 2006: Ambassador – Galaxy Rising Star Award: Group 2006
- 2011 CBC Radio 3 Bucky Award for Most Canadian Song "Northern Air"
- 2012 XM/Sirus Indies – Favorite Folk/Roots Artist of the Year
- 2013: Days Into Years – 2013 Juno Awards – Roots & Traditional Album Of The Year: Group

=== Nominations ===
- 2006: Ambassador – 2006 Juno Awards – Roots & Traditional Album Of The Year: Group
- 2009: Mountain Meadows – 2009 Juno Awards – Roots & Traditional Album Of The Year: Group
- 2009: Mountain Meadows – 2009 Juno Awards – Juno Award for Design and Artwork
- 2009: Mountain Meadows – 2009 Polaris Music Prize
- 2011: "West End Sky" – Genie Award for Best Achievement in Music – Original Song
- 2013: Days Into Years – 2013 Juno Awards – Roots & Traditional Album Of The Year: Group
- 2015: Work and Love – 2015 Juno Awards – Roots & Traditional Album Of The Year: Group

== Instruments ==
=== Mark Sasso ===
- Guitar: Gibson L-00 Acoustic
- Banjo: Wildwood Open Back with the 5th string and its tuner removed
- Ukulele: Oscar Schmidt
- Harmonica

=== Casey Laforet ===
- Acoustic guitar: Gibson LG0 painted picture of Chief Joseph on backside of guitar
- Electric guitar: Fender Telecaster Deluxe
- Bass pedals: Roland PK-5 into MIDI sampler: Roland SP404
- Ukulele: Oscar Schmidt
- Distortion pedal: Boss MT-2 Metal Zone

=== Stephen Pitkin ===
- Drums, Keyboards, Additional Percussion
