= Ambassador (album) =

Studio album by Elliott Brood
- Released: October 2005
- Genre: Alternative country
- Length: 46:22
- Label: Six Shooter Records

Elliott Brood chronology
Tin Type (2004)	Ambassador (2005)	Mountain Meadows (2008)

Professional ratings
Review scores
Source	Rating
Allmusic	4/5 stars

Ambassador is the title of the first full-length album released by the Canadian alternative country band Elliott Brood. It was released in October 2005 on the independent music label Six Shooter Records. The album is titled for the Ambassador Bridge, which links Windsor, Ontario — the hometown of two of the band's three members — to Detroit, Michigan.

The album was nominated for Roots and Traditional Album of the Year (Group) at the 2006 Juno Awards, but lost to the self-titled album by The Duhks.

== Track listing ==
1. "Twill" – 6:30
2. "President (35)" – 2:26
3. "Second Son" – 3:35
4. "Acer Negundo" – 3:19
5. "Wolfgang" – 2:43
6. "My Friend" – 3:07
7. "Jackson" – 4:00
8. "Johnny Rooke" – 4:21
9. "The Bridge" – 3:03
10. "Back of the Lot" – 2:50
11. "W.W.Y.H.M.B." – 4:26
12. "Superior" – 6:02
