= Molinos (album) =

Studio album by The Paperboys
- Released: October 21, 1997
- Recorded: Spring and summer 1997
- Studios: Mushroom Studios, Vancouver, British Columbia, Canada
- Genres: Celtic rock; worldbeat
- Length: 54:51
- Labels: Stony Plain Records; Stompy Discs
- Producer: John Webster

The Paperboys chronology
Late as Usual (1994)	Molinos (1997)	Postcards (2000)

Singles from Molinos
- 1. "After the First Time" Released: 1997; 2. "Molinos" Released: 1997

Molinos is the third studio album by Canadian worldbeat/Celtic rock band The Paperboys. After the success of their second album Late as Usual (1994), Neill Burnett and Moritz Behm left the band and were replaced by Shannon Saunders and Shona LeMotte, both of whom came from musical families and had been steeped in Celtic and bluegrass traditions for years. After a tour of the United States, flutist Hanz Araki joined the band in 1996. The new members of the band drew the band into an increasingly world music-based direction, and began work on Molinos shortly afterwards.

The band recorded the album at Vancouver's Mushroom Studios with rock producer John Webster in spring and summer 1997. The band tried to create an album that showed the band's disparate musical influences in world music, with the record combining influences from Celtic, bluegrass, Mexican, African, Latin and Eastern European music, but in an effective, radio-friendly way. The band tried to capture the energy and feel of their live shows on the record. The album also contains numerous guest musicians and interjects numerous jigs and reels, both new and traditional, into the band's pop songs.

The album was released by the band's own label Stompy Discs, in association with Stony Plain Records, in October 1997. Two singles were issued from the album, "After the First Time" and "Molinos". The latter became the band's most commercially successful song, with it and its music video being picked up on radio and video stations, although most notably, adult album alternative station in Seattle called The Mountain added the single to their playlist, and as such proved very popular with its listeners, with attenders of the band's Seattle concerts tripling. The album itself received critical acclaim, with critics complimenting its musical style, songs, influences and production. In 1998, Molinos won the Juno Award for "Best Roots and Traditional Album" and the West Coast Music Award for "Best Roots Recording".

== Background ==
The Paperboys were originally formed as a Celtic rock band in Vancouver 1991 by bassist Christopher Jonat and Tom Landa on acoustic guitar and vocals, with Jeremy Hughes on accordion and vocals, Kevin Ball on fiddle, and Dave Plenkovich on drums. This early version of the band was very popular with the Vancouver college crowds, but, after creative discrepancies, Tom kept the Paperboys name and all the other remaining bandmembers reformed as The Clumsy Lovers. Initially, Landa discovered Celtic music via the Canadian band Spirit of the West, whose flautist and co-vocalist was Geoffrey Kelly. After becoming a line-up of Landa, Cam Salay and Moritz Behm, and releasing a cassette-only release entitled January (1992), The Paperboys soon added Neil Burnett to the band on whistles and harp and, later, drummer Paul "Lolly" Lawton through a "Musicians Wanted" advertisement. With this line-up, the band recorded their first official album, Late as Usual (1994), with producers Kelly and Colin Nairne, producer and guitarist for Barney Bentall.

Released on St. Patrick's Day 1994, Late as Usual was promoted with the band's first Canadian tour, where they "crossed the country sleeping on couches, playing in dingy bars and Irish pubs," with Landa recalling that "had it not been for our families who fed us along the way and gave us both encouragement and a place to sleep, that first tour would have broken us." Upon returning from the tour, they found some minor success when, after filming a music video for the Late as Usual song "She Said", the video found some airplay on "Canada's MTV", MuchMusic, whilst the CBC and several college radio stations also added the song to their playlists in both Canada and the United States, whilst in January 1995, the album went on to garner a Juno Award nomination for Roots and Traditional Album of the Year, which Landa said was "a definite nod from the industry that we were on the right track."

Nonetheless, in the advent of their second tour being booked, Neil Burnett and Moritz Behm left the band to pursue other musical ventures and finish their studies, leaving the three remaining band members to quickly find two replacements, Shannon Saunders (fiddles, accordion and bass) and Shona LeMotte (fiddle), a line-up change which radically changed the band's sound. Saunders and LeMotte came from musical families and had been steeped in Celtic and bluegrass traditions for years. The new five-piece line-up concentrated more on playing in the United States in cities such as Seattle and San Francisco, and it was at one of these shows where they met Seattle resident Hanz Araki, a skilled flutist and shakuhachi player, who in 1996 joined the band, again dramatically changing the band's sound and "bringing with him not only a unique ethnic background but also a well-studied Irish sensibility." It was with this new line-up and a new batch of songs that the band began work on their second album Molinos.

== Recording ==
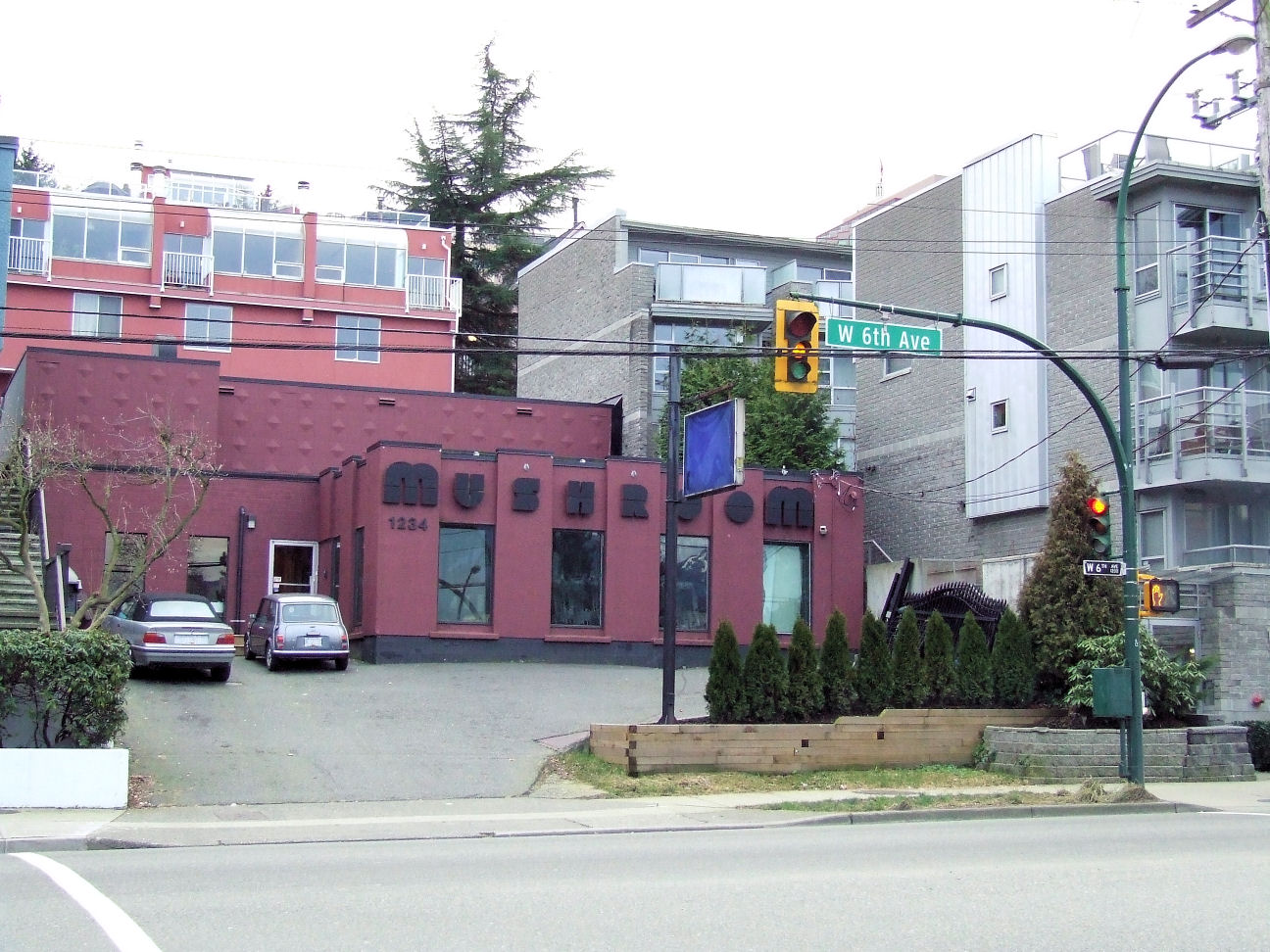
Molinos was recorded in Mushroom Studios, Vancouver.

The new line-up of the band began work on the songs on Molinos in 1996, and in the spring and summer of 1997, the band recorded Molinos at Mushroom Studios, in Vancouver, British Columbia, a recording studio with a long history in Canadian music. In aiming to achieve a new sound, the band hired prolific rock producer John Webster to produce the album. Webster also engineered and mixed the album, whilst Peter Wosniak co-engineered it. Overdubs were recorded at Beatty Lane and Chaz Jean Studios, whilst the album was mixed at The Warehouse with the assistance of Gary Winger, and was mastered by Geore Leger at Utopia Parkway.

For Molinos, the band tried to capture the energy and feel of their live shows as best as they could, despite their belief that "nothing quite compares to an actual concert." Due to the new line-up of the band changing the band's sound considerably from their original, more traditional Celtic rock sound, the band wanted to achieve a sound that blended all of the band's musical interests, from disparate world genres that, besides Celtic music, also included African, Latin, bluegrass and Eastern European music, but with a contemporary edge that meant music from the album could still be played on the radio. Landa said that becoming a pop band was not the group's aim but that commercial radio stations could use a "good dose of ethnic and roots music, " and considered Webster to be, "odd though it sounds, the perfect choice for what we were trying to do." The band hoped that listeners would feel inspired to discover "the roots of this music" which had in turn inspired the band to make the album.

Numerous guest musicians recorded parts for the album; "Crashing Down" features vocal contributions from Steve Mitchell, Danny Kramer, Anette Ducharme, Jane Sawyer and guitar work from Alpha Yaya Diallo, Graham MacLennan performs pipes on "Pound a Week Rise", Ducharme also performs vocals on "Molinos", "Salvation" and "Waste Some Time", the latter of which Kramer also sings on, whilst Webster himself performs a B3 Hammond organ on "After the First Time" and "Salvation", Harmonium on "Molinos", keyboards on "Same for Everyone" and "percussion on a bunch of stuff."

== Musical style ==
An eclectic worldbeat album, Molinos features several disparate regional types of traditional music and fuses them with accessible pop music, production and melodies. David Kidman of NetRhythms called the album a "vigorous fusion of rootsy pop" with distinct Celtic, bluegrass and Latin influences. Landa said that although the material on Molinos is "a mix of folk and roots, we wanted to come up with a sound that blended all of our interests - Celtic, bluegrass, Latin, African and Eastern European–but could still get play on the radio. Not that becoming a pop band was our ultimate goal, but I believed (and still do) that Top 40 radio is mostly full of shit and could use a good dose of ethnic and roots music." NetRhythms also stated that the album "almost effortlessly conveys the high energy for which they've been renowned at festivals in recent years, certainly" and said that at times the band's "driving full-frontal sound and approach" reminded me of Tanglefoot, at others of the Waterboys or Oysterband without that same degree of political edge, at others there are hints of Los Lobos, the Specials, Ukrainian dance, South African townships jive and klezmer–"all wonderful stuff!" A Mexican influence is also prominent on the album.

" All six members are excellent musicians, and it would be invidious to single out any individuals from a uniformly strong lineup, while Tom's own songwriting is both solid and accessible."

— David Kidman of NetRhythms.

Rick Anderson of Allmusic said that "what the Paperboys bring to the table with their version of Celtic rock is something lacking in almost all of the other fine, artists who have taken a similar approach: namely, consistent skill at writing real pop songs with unembarrassing lyrics and honest-to-goodness melodic hooks." He noted how on Molinos, the Paperboys "play traditional jigs and reels with solid conviction but almost always as adjuncts to their original songs. The effect can be thrilling." Another critic, Tom Knapp of cultural arts magazine Rambles, characterized the album as possessing: "an 'infectious' style of accessible, bluegrass-tinged pop rock which definitely makes listeners aware that, yes indeed, a Celtic influence is at work here. Just listen to Shona Le Mottee's blistering fiddle riffs or Hank Araki's swirling whistle solos in some of the band's bouncy dance songs if you don't believe me." Most of the album's are written by the band's main songwriter and singer Landa and have a "wistful pop air about them, but there's a driving undercurrent of Celtic wildness and bluegrass stylings which set the Paperboys apart from their just-pop peers." Multiple Celtic-bluegrass breakdowns are said to "fill the album."

== Composition ==
=== First half ===
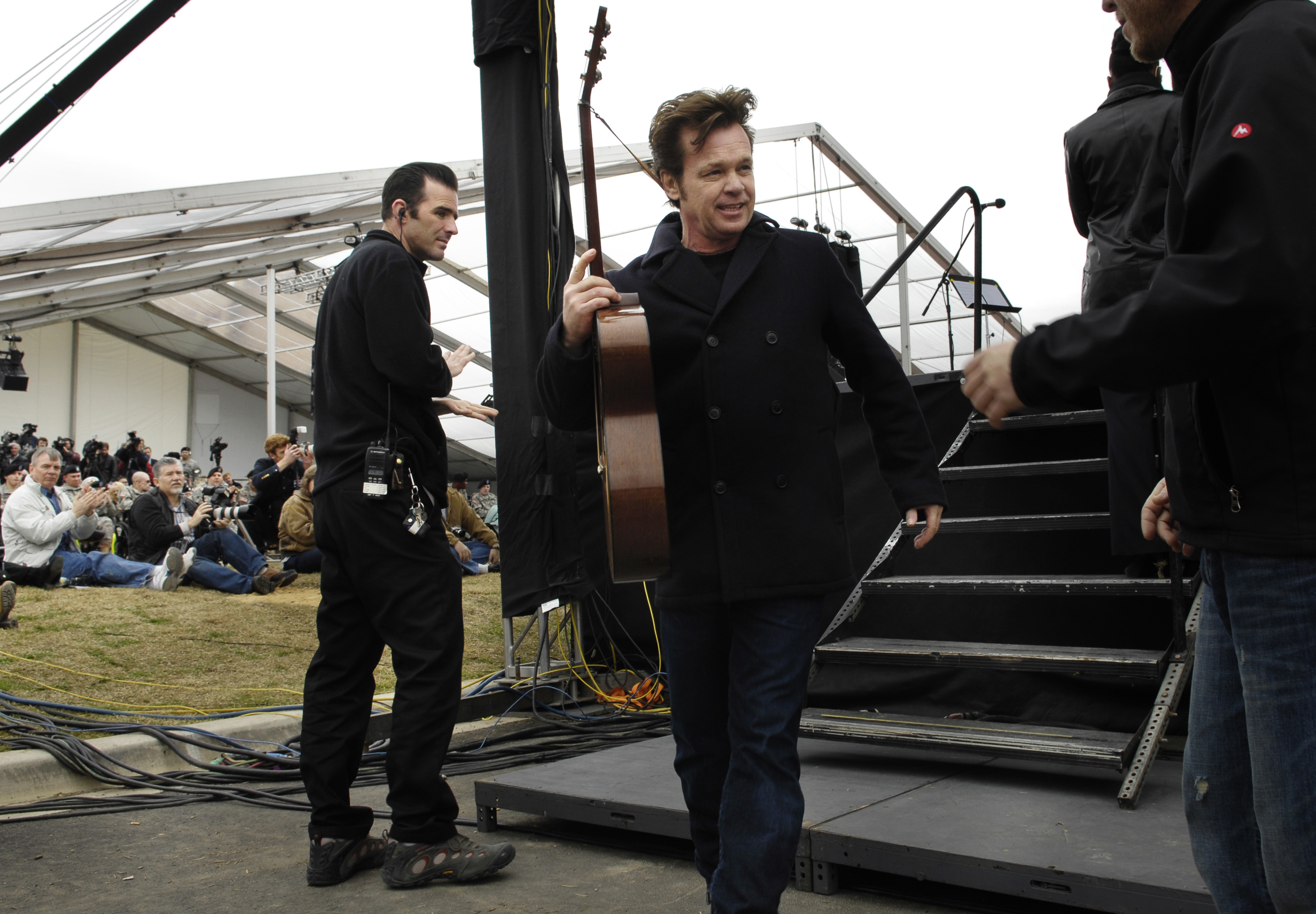
"Waste Some Time" was influenced by Lonesome Jubilee by John Mellencamp (pictured).

The opening song and title track "Molinos", co-written with Annette Ducharme who had written or co-written several hits for several Canadian artists, was written "partly over the phone" and was inspired by a poster with the message "They are only windmills, they cannot hear you." The song was the band's first to feature a drum loop, which was described by one critic as "a dance-floor drum beat, and tells the story of someone who "doesn't quite fit in." Incorporating elements of "The Foxhunters Reel", Landa considers the song "the perfect blend of pop and Celtic." "Salvation", a song about "love lost to god," incorporates the John Campbell-written reel "Sandy MacIntyre's Trip to Boston" for "added flair" and in the words of Landa, was inspired by how "values and religion are very sacred and beautiful things. The spiritual path is never an easy one and sometimes people get lost along the way." Drummer Paul Lawton wrote "Waste Some Time", a song heavily influenced by John Mellencamp's Lonesome Jubilee (1987) and features Webster on Hammond organ. Concerning the song's subject matter, Landa said that "some of the best days are when the map has been lost and the plans have been thrown away. Besides, that's what answering machines are for."

"I've Just Seen a Face", a cover of the Lennon-McCartney-composed Beatles folk song from Help! (1965), is given a "not-too-breakneck rocked-up bluegrassy treatment" and incorporates the "Coast of Austria" reel. Lawton wrote "Same for Everyone" and remains one of Landa's favourite Paperboys songs. Although the band tried several times to play the song live, they thought it was overshadowed by the "faster, more aggressive songs" as a result of "the danger of playing in night clubs," but Landa thought they captured the essence of the song in the recording. The first part of "Annabell's Reel/Theme Time" was written by Cam for a dance company and named for "a small furry friend," whilst the second part, "Theme Time", is "typical of 50s polyester bluegrass." Landa, speaking about the lyrical inspiration for "Crashing Down", said "When I was in school, I used to write letters to the South African government on behalf of Amnesty International. It seemed back then that our efforts were in vain. I'm glad I was wrong. Don't give up!"

=== Second half ===
"While You Were Sleeping" begins with an Araki whistle set in slow, airy motion, before kicking into two fast-paced jigs, "The Breathing Method" and "The Jaunt". "After the First Time You Lose" was written by Landa and guest singer Steve Mitchell for the alternative country band Yard Sale, who were described as "sort of a Paperboys spin-off band." The song incorporates the reel "Mrs. Wedderburn's Reel. (For Katie.)" and lyrically concerns "feeling tired and discouraged." "Drunken Wagoneer", which features double fiddle, is radically different from the original fiddle tune it is based on, and showcases Saunders' "great fiddle playing and ear for harmony and arrangement." Webster added an additional edge with some distortion on almost every instrument, and due to its double fiddle work, is rarely played live by the band, although Landa later noted that he "loves it" and "always thought it would be perfect for a soundtrack." "Pound a Week Rise", a "miners' song" written by Ed Pickford with music composed by Cam Salay, began life as a tune called "The Blue Velvet Dress" which evolved into a song the band learnt from Dick Gaughan, and incorporates the reel "Tommy's Tarbukas", written by Alasdair Fraser.

The highly Celtic-influenced "Swallow's Tail Jig/Cabin Fever Ceilidh/Swallow's Tail Reel", a set of tunes incorporating newly written pieces and traditional tunes, was first arranged for Vancouver's Celtic Festival and then became a regular in the band's set list. The "Cabin Fever Ceilidh" part was written by le Mottee for his friend Ray Beattie. Discussing the lyrics of "Oh Maria", which incorporates ska influences, Landa said "In Mexico there's a saying... 'El que se fue a la villa, perdio su silla,' which means 'He who snoozes - loses'." "Ray's Ukrainian Wine Cellar Polka/Nelli's Afterthought" closes the album. The band named the first polka from Ray Colosimo of Thunder Bay, Ontario, late one night after a gig; the band recalled that they sat in his basement, or wine cellar as they exchanged tunes and home-made vino. Colosimo only knew that it was a Ukrainian wedding polka that didn't have a title or author, hence why the band came up with the title, and after this, Saunders was inspired to write the second polka. Tom Knapp of Rambles said "if this doesn't end your listening experience on a foot-tapping upbeat, your volume must be down all the way."

== Release and promotion ==
Molinos was released on October 21, 1997 by two Canada-based independent record labels, the band's self-established Stompy Discs and Stony Plain Records. Despite its autumn 1997 release date, some sources have incorrectly retrospectively cited its release date as July 1, 1997 or July 10, 1997. The album title comes from the Spanish for "windmills." The artwork was designed by Ralph Alfonso and features a painting by Robert Cerins on the album cover and illustrations of musical instruments by Tom Bogley within the liner notes. Unusually for a roots fusion band, the sources for the interpolated tunes, such as the reels, are fully credited in the insert notes. The band dedicated the album to the memory of Stewart Wickens.

Two singles were released from Molinos; the first, "After the First Time", also had a music video produced and received airplay on Canada's CMT, MuchMusic and numerous other radio stations and music video channels across Canada. However, the second single, "Molinos", was according to Landa what "really started things moving." A music video for the song starring Dean Meehan was produced, and both the song and the video were picked up on radio and video stations, again including CMT. According to the band, the biggest surprise was when the Seattle-based adult album alternative radio station The Mountain added the single to their playlist; Landa commented "bless those commercial stations that play independent bands." The song got a huge response from the station's listeners who started requesting it constantly. The attendance at the band's shows in Seattle subsequently tripled and copies of the disc could not be printed fast enough; Landa recalled "we felt like rock stars."

== Critical reception ==
Professional ratings
Review scores
Source	Rating
Allmusic	4/5 stars
NetRhythms	favourable
Rambles	favourable

The album was released to unanimous critical acclaim, with music critics praising, among numerous points, the album's songs, musical work and production. Tom Knapp of Rambles was very favourable in his review, in which he concluded that "Canada just keeps sending more and more good stuff down south over the border into the States. With any luck, a few more American musicians will be inspired to put out good stuff like this. In the meantime, there's the Paperboys to help carry the slack. What are you waiting for?" Rick Anderson of Allmusic rated the album four stars out of five and said "the band's playing is solid and nicely idiomatic, but never academic or stiff. Singer/guitarist Tom Landa has a good voice and knows how to shape a song, and fiddlers Shona le Mottee and Shannon Saunders weave a sparkling fabric around and behind him. This album is a delight from beginning to end."

In a retrospective review published in the 2000s, David Kidman of NetRhythms was favourable and said that "The Paperboys have been going for over ten years, but this album's been my first exposure to the band. And wow! for it's a superior, vigorous fusion of rootsy pop with distinct Celtic, bluegrass and Latin influences. And what I hear, I like rather a lot." He concluded that "I understand that the band have latterly moved away from the Celtic and bluegrass influences and more into the realms of soul. Molinos, however, hasn't dated one iota, and is one of the most rousing and infectious CDs of its kind – look no further for some truly vital hardcore roots music that puts most other worldbeat practitioners firmly in the shade." The combination of critical success and fan popularity lead to Red House Records naming the album the band's "breakthrough", and noted it gave the band a strong following in the United States.

In the spring of 1998, Molinos won the Juno Award for "Best Roots and Traditional Album", the first time the band had won the award. The album also won the West Coast Music Award for "Best Roots Recording" later that same year, and was nominated for an Independent Music Award. The album also featured on numerous year-end "Albums of the Year" lists and the band gained a reputation as "one of the top Celtic and roots bands on the circuit." Although the band's line-up shifted after the album's release, Landa considers the Molinos-era line-up to be "the definitive Paperboys line-up." Several of the album's tracks, "Molinos", "Waste Some Time", "Drunken Wagoneer" and "Same for Everybody", featured on the band's best-of album Tenure (2002).

== Track listing ==
1. "Molinos" – 3:22 (Tom Landa, Annette Ducharme)
2. "Salvation" – 4:02 (Landa)
3. "Waste Some Time" – 4:39 (Landa, Ducharme)
4. "I've Just Seen a Face" – 3:27 (John Lennon, Paul McCartney)
5. "Same for Everyone" – 4:30 (Paul Lawton)
6. "Annabell's Reel / Theme Time" – 3:20 (Bill Emerson, Cam Salay, Jimmy Martin, Paul Williams)
7. "Crashing Down" – 3:50 (Landa)
8. "While You Were Sleeping / The Breathing Method / The Jaunt" – 5:37 (Landa, Hanz Araki)
9. "After the First Time" – 3:48 (Landa, Steve Mitchell)
10. "Drunken Wagoneer" – 3:47 (traditional)
11. "Pound A Week Rise" – 4:45 (Cam Salay, Ed Pickford)
12. Swallow's Tail Jig / Cabin Fever Ceilidh / Swallow's Tail Reel" – 3:33 (Shona le Mottee, traditional)
13. "Oh Maria" – 3:40 (Landa, Jenise Boland)
14. "Ray's Ukrainian Wine Cellar Polka / Nelli's Afterthought" – 2:06 (traditional, Shannon Saunders)

== Personnel ==
=== The Paperboys ===
- Tom Landa – lead vocals, guitars, bouzouki, mandolin
- Cam Salay – banjo, bass
- Paul Lawton – drums, percussion, vocals
- Shana le Motee – fiddle, vocals
- Hanza Araki – flute, low whistles, whistle, shakuhachi, vocals
- Shannon Saunders – accordion, bass, fiddle, viola

=== Guest appearances ===
- Alpha Yaya Diallo – guitar ("Crashing Down")
- John Webster – B3 Hammond organ ("After the First Time" and "Salvation), Harmonium ("Molinos"), keyboards ("Same for Everyone"), percussion
- Graham MacLennan – pipes ("Pound a Week")
- Anette Ducharme – vocals ("Crashing Down", "Molnios", "Salvation" and "Waste Some Time")
- Danny Kramer – vocals ("Waste Some Time" and "Crashing Down")
- Steve Mitchell – vocals ("Crashing Down")
- Jane Sawyer – vocals ("Crashing Down")

=== Production ===
- John Webster – production, mixing, engineering
- Pete Wosniak – assistant engineering
- George Leger – mastering
- Gary Winger – assistant mixing
- Ralph Alfonso – design
- Robert Cerins – cover painting
- Tom Bogley – instrument illustrations
