= Cordial (album) =

Studio album by La Bottine Souriante
- Released: 2001
- Recorded: 2001
- Genre: Folk
- Length: 59:03
- Label: Les Productions Mille-Pattes
- Producer: La Bottine Souriante

La Bottine Souriante chronology
Xième (1998)	Cordial (2001)	Anthologie (2001)

Cordial is the tenth studio album from Québécois band La Bottine Souriante. It was released in 2001 through the band's own label, Les Productions Mille-Pattes.

Like in the band's recent albums, contemporary instruments are added in to give the songs a modern sound. In this album, synthesizers, drums and mixing (track 16) are introduced. The first track is even mixed with traditional arabic music. All the songs and reels are still mostly traditional.

== Personnel ==
- Régent Archambault: Double bass, electric bass, chorist voice
- Michel Bordeleau: Guitar, mandolin, fiddle, percussion, feet, soloist and chorist voice
- Pierre Bélisle: Piano, piano accordion, synthesizer, trumpet, hammond B-3
- André Brunet: Fiddle, guitar, percussion, chorist voice
- Robert Ellis: Bass trombone, percussion, chorist voice
- Jean Fréchette: Tenor saxophone, percussion, whistle, chorist voice
- Yves Lambert: Accordions, harmonicas, spoons, soloist and chorist voice
- Jocelyn Lapointe: Trumpet, flugelhorn
- André Verreault: Trombon

== Track listing ==
1. Dans Paris y'a t'une brune (The Brunette from Paris) – 3:10
2. La grondeuse (The Grumbling Woman) – 4:04
3. Le démon sort de l'enfer (The Devil Comes out of Hell) – 4:32
4. Set à Ubert (Ubert's Set) – 3:30
5. En p'tit boggie (Giddy Up) – 2:44
6. Aimé – 3:40
7. Lune de miel (Honeymoon) – 3:44
8. Suède Inn – 3:10
9. J'ai fait une maîtresse (I Got Me a Mistress) – 2:36
10. À bas les rideaux (Out with the Lies) – 3:51
11. Les noces d'or (Golden Wedding Reel) – 2:15
12. Viens-tu prendre une bière? (Come Have a Beer!) – 2:34
13. Ma paillasse (My Straw Mat) – 3:02
14. Chant de la luette (The Warbler's Song) – 2:54
15. Reel de Baie St-Paul (Baie St-Paul's Reel) – 5:37
16. Et boucle La Bottine (And "Loop" La Bottine) – 7:22
