= Shona Le Mottee =

Canadian celtic/pop fiddler and vocalist

- Genres: Celtic; pop
- Occupation: Musician
- Instruments: Fiddle; vocals
- Years active: 1995–present
- Labels: Stony Plain; Warner
- Formerly of: The Paperboys

Shona Le Mottee is a Canadian celtic/pop fiddler and vocalist who was previously based in Vancouver. In 2019, she relocated to Glasgow.

== Biography ==
Shona has an extensive musical career which took off in 1995 when she joined the internationally-known Canadian Celtic-pop group The Paperboys. In 1997, Le Mottee recorded the album Molinos with The Paperboys. It was released on the Stony Plain and Warner Canada labels, and in March 1998, it won the Canadian Juno Award for "Best Roots and Traditional Album – Group". Le Mottee also recorded two music videos with The Paperboys which were broadcast across the country on CMT and MuchMusic. In 1998–99, Le Mottee performed with Michael Flatley's Lord of the Dance at the New York Casino in Las Vegas and at Walt Disney World in Orlando, Florida. Le Mottee has also been a fiddle instructor for over 17 years. From 2002 to 2007, she was invited to be on staff at the Rocky Mountain Fiddle Camp in Colorado and the Coast Strings Fiddle School in British Columbia. In 2005, Le Mottee released her debut solo album, Destination Grouville. She has also performed and recorded with the Simon Fraser University Pipe Band, English songsmith Tim Readman, West-African folk musician Alpha Yaya Diallo, the Irish party bands The Town Pants and The Pat Chessell Band, and the Celtic folk band Mad Pudding.
