= Wyrd Sisters (band) =

Canadian folk music group

- Origin: Winnipeg, Manitoba, Canada
- Genre: Folk
- Years active: 1990–present
- Label: independent
- Members: Kim Baryluk; Johanna Hildebrandt; Dem McLeod; Marie Josee Dandeneau; Carolyna Loveless; Id Guinness; Ledenhed
- Past members: Nancy Reinhold; Kim Segal; Lianne Fournier; Kiva; Lindsay Jane; Jennifer Gibson; Delina
- Website: wyrdsisters.com

The Wyrd Sisters are a Canadian folk music group formed in 1990 in Winnipeg by founding members Kim Baryluk, Nancy Reinhold and Kim Segal. Presenting initially as a trio, the group later grew to include a full band.

The Wyrd Sisters have released six independent recordings to both fan and critical acclaim. Herizon Magazine dubbed the Wyrd Sisters' 1997 release Raw Voice, "a collection of 11 lyrically intelligent and musically diverse songs that can best be described as folk-pop-jazz fusion with a feminist bent" and said of the band's 2001 release Sin & Other Salvations, the lyrics were marked by "elegant, spare poetry" and new band member Kiva's "ethereal tones enhance the beautiful harmonies that have marked the [band's] previous three recordings".

Three of the Wyrd Sisters' recordings have been nominated for Juno Awards (Canada's national music awards) in the Best Roots & Traditional Album - Group category: Inside The Dreaming (1996), Raw Voice (1998), and Sin & Other Salvations (2002). Sin & Other Salvations won a Prairie Music Award (forerunner of the Western Canadian Music Awards) for best album, Roots and Traditional. Many of their songs have been recorded and covered by other performers. They have several videos and have scored music for movies.

In 2005, the band began a legal action against Warner Brothers, Jarvis Cocker of Pulp, and Jonny Greenwood and Phil Selway of Radiohead for trademark infringement over the use of their band name in the film Harry Potter and the Goblet of Fire. The injunction was dismissed, and the band was ordered to pay costs. As of March 2010, the lawsuit has been settled, the details sealed.

== Band members ==
The band has evolved throughout its history, always centred on a trio of vocalists, and backed on stage and in recordings by additional instrumentalists.

Members of the core vocal trio have included:

- Kim Baryluk (1990–present) (all recordings)
- Nancy Reinhold (1990–2002) (vocals & guitar) (Leave a Little Light, Inside the Dreaming, Raw Voice, Sin & Other Salvations)
- Kim Segal (1990–1992) (Leave a Little Light)
- Lianne Fournier (1993–2000) (vocals & keyboard) (Inside the Dreaming, Raw Voice)
- Kiva (2000–2005) (vocals & keyboard) (Sin & Other Salvations)
- Lindsay Jane (2003–2004) (vocals & guitar)
- Jennifer Gibson (2005–2006) (Wholly)
- Delina (2006) (Wholly)
- Johanna Hildebrandt (2006–present) (vocals & violin) (Wholly, A Little More Light)
- Dem McLeod (2006–present) (A Little More Light)

Additional touring musicians have included:

- Carolyna Loveless (2008–present) (drums, percussion, background vocals)

Additional musicians on recordings have included:

Leave a Little Light: Don Benedictson – bass, Greg Lowe – guitars, Sandy D'Aoust – guitar, Marilyn Lerner – keyboards, Mitch Dorge – percussion, Karen Erhardt – cello, Reg Kelln – snare

Inside the Dreaming: Don Benedictson – bass, Marilyn Lerner – piano & keyboards, Andy Stochansky – percussion, Paul O'Neill – guitars & mandolin, Gilles Fournier – upright bass, Lori Freedman – bass clarinet, Eli Herskovitch – clarinet, Dave Lawton – Trumpet, Sasha Boychouk – soprano saxophone, Richard Moody – viola, Larry Roy – guitar, Veronique Potvin – viola, Glenn Matthews – percussion

Raw Voice: Don Benedictson (as db benedictson) – bass, Rob Lee – drums, Paul O'Neill – guitars, mandolin & synth, Darryl Havers – organs, Sasha Boychouk – saxophones, Marilyn Lerner – piano, Richard Moody – viola, Celso Machado – percussion, Paul Janzen – EWI, Gord Kidder – harmonicas, Monica Guenter – viola, Karen Moffat – violin, Christina Zacharius – violin, Leanne Zacharius – cello, Sal Ferraris – percussion, Bill Spornitz – penny whistle, Shane Nestruk – baritone saxophone, Rick Boughton – trumpets, Lori Freedman – clarinets, Murray Pulver – guitar, Norm Dugas – organ

Sin & Other Salvations: Murray Pulver – guitars, mandolin & additional vocals, Daniel Roy – drums & percussion, Don Benedictson – bass, Bill Spornitz – soprano saxophone, Richard Moody – violin & viola, Marc Arnould – organ, Ron Halldorson – pedal steel, Pierre Guerin – bouzouki & mandolin, Kevin Breit – national steel guitar, Marilyn Lerner – piano, Paul Balcain – tenor saxophone, Lindsay Bart – Irish wooden flute, additional vocals: Sunny Breaks, John Schritt & Sam Baardman

Wholly: Daniel Roy – drums & percussion, Paul Yee – bass, Murray Pulver – guitars, mandolin, percussion & background vocals, Marc Arnould – piano, accordion & organ, John Schritt – vocals, Richard Moody – strings, Julene Gravette – drums, Marie Josee Dandeneau – bass, additional vocals: Annali Braul, Lottie Enns, Gail Zacharias, Karin Kliewer

== Discography ==
- Leave a Little Light (1993)
- Inside the Dreaming (1995)
- Raw Voice (1997)
- Sin and Other Salvations (2001)
- Wholly (2007)
- A Little More Light (2008)

== Compilations ==
The Wyrd Sisters' music has been featured on the following compilations:

- We Are Each Others' Angels – Benefit Compilation CD, Lifeworks Media, NY (2000)
- Folk Alliance Showcase Compilation III – North American Folk Alliance (1999)
- The Hanging Garden – Movie Soundtrack, Virgin Music Canada (1997)
- Christmas From Home Benefit Compilation CD – Radio Canada (1997)
- If A Tree Falls – Earthbeat! Records Compilation CD (1996)
- New Canadian Women Singers – CBC Variety Compilation CD (1993)

== Additional works ==
- A Web Not a Ladder – film score, a National Film Board of Canada documentary (1993)
- Making It Work – TV series theme, WTN & Out of Breath Productions (1993)

== See also ==
- Legal disputes over the Harry Potter series
- Wyrd
- Urðr
