= Xième =

Studio album by La Bottine Souriante
- Released: 1998
- Recorded: 1998
- Genre: Folk
- Length: 51:18
- Label: Les Productions Mille-Pattes
- Producer: La Bottine Souriante

La Bottine Souriante chronology
En spectacle (1996)	Xième (1998)	Cordial (2001)

Xième (Tenth), like its name in French indicates, is La Bottine Souriante's tenth released album. A studio album released in 1998, it was released in the United States under the title Rock 'n Reel.

== Track listing ==
1. "Reel du Forgeron"
2. "Les trois cavaliers"
3. "Arin Québec"
4. "Chanson de Mathurin"
5. "Medley des Éboulements"
6. "Ciel d'Automne"
7. "Yoyo-Verret"
8. "Suite Métisse"
9. "Un air si doux"
10. "Alice au pays d'Arto" (Prelude)
11. "Alice au pays d'Arto" (Valse)
12. "Ami de la bouteille"
13. "Margot Fringue"
