= Days into Years =

Days Into Years

Studio album by Elliott Brood
- Released: September 27, 2011
- Genre: Alternative country Folk; Folk rock
- Label: Paper Bag Records

Elliott Brood chronology
Mountain Meadows (2008)	Days Into Years (2011)	Tin Type II (2013)

Days Into Years is the third full-length album by Canadian alternative country band Elliott Brood, released September 27, 2011 on Paper Bag Records. The recording is also available on vinyl.

The album's first single, "If I Get Old", was inspired by a visit to the Étaples Military Cemetery in France, where many dead Canadian soldiers from World War I are buried. The album also includes the band's song "West End Sky", originally composed for the soundtrack to Adriana Maggs' film Grown Up Movie Star. This song was nominated for Best Achievement in Music – Original Song at the 31st Genie Awards.

== Critical reception ==
According to the review aggregator Metacritic, Days into Years received "generally favorable reviews" based on a weighted average score of 78 out of 100 from 5 critic scores. Kerry Doole of Exclaim! wrote that ''The group's sound has broadened and mellowed on their third full-length album, but all in the service of melodically and lyrically rich material'' and calls it ''their best work to date''. Sarah Greene of Now, in a less positive review, called it ''An interesting turn for the well-loved rabble-rousers''.

Professional ratings
Aggregate scores
Source	Rating
Metacritic	78
Review scores
Source	Rating
AllMusic	4/5 stars
Now	3/5 stars

== Track listing ==
1. Lindsay
2. Lines
3. If I Get Old
4. Hold You
5. Will They Bury Us?
6. West End Sky
7. Northern Air
8. My Mother's Side
9. Owen Sound
10. Their Will
