= Jackson Delta =

- Origin: Peterborough, Ontario, Canada
- Genres: blues
- Years active: 1980s–present
- Members: Gary Peeples; Rick Fines; Al Black

Jackson Delta are a Canadian blues musical group from Peterborough, Ontario. They are two-time Juno Award nominees for Best Roots and Traditional Album, receiving nods at the Juno Awards of 1991 for Acoustic Blues and at the Juno Awards of 1993 for I Was Just Thinking That.

The band's members are Gary Peeples on vocals, slide guitar and dobro; Rick Fines on guitar; and Al Black on drums, harmonica and washboard.

== History ==
Jackson Delta was co-founded in the 1980s by Fines, Peeples and Black in Peterborough. The band was mainly fronted by Fines.

The band recorded their debut album Delta Sunrise in 1988 at Sun Studio in Memphis, Tennessee, and released it in 1989. They released Acoustic Blues in 1990 and Looking Back in 1991.

In 1991, they performed at the Folk on the Rocks Festival in Brandon, Manitoba. That year Acoustic Blues was nominated for a Juno Award as Best Roots & Traditional Album. They played at the Edmonton Folk Festival and the Mariposa Folk Festival in 1992.

The band recorded I Was Just Thinking That... live with boogie woogie pianist Gene Taylor in 1992; it was nominated as a Juno Best Roots & Traditional Album again in 1993. That year they independently released an album, Lookin' Back, and performed at the Winnipeg Folk Festival.

After 1995, the members of Jackson Delta concentrated on other projects, but continued to perform together several times a year. They recorded a live album, Go for the Heart: Rob Watson and Jackson Delta Electric Live in 1996 at Peterborough's Market Hall with blues guitarist Rob (Bobby) Watson.

The band broke up in 2000, but its members came together to participate in Al Black's 2010 album Happy as a Monkey. They have performed occasional reunion shows in the Peterborough area, most recently in 2017.
