= Kiva (musician) =

Canadian singer

Kiva Simova
- Origin: Manitoba, Canada
- Genres: world beat, jazz/ pop/ experimental harmonic overtone singing
- Occupations: singer, songwriter vocal instructor
- Instruments: vocals, keyboards
- Years active: 1978–present
- Label: Yemyss Music (independent)

Kiva Simova is a Canadian harmonic overtone singer, keyboard player, and songwriter, based in Winnipeg, MB, Canada. She is internationally recognized as a western pioneer in world beat/jazz music, particularly the art of harmonic overtone singing (singing two pitches simultaneously) which she both performs, records and teaches. Also known for extended vocal techniques (non-lyrical), she incorporates these techniques in her own group MIDBRAIN SURFERS, an experimental improvisational project. She has composed for overtone choir and directed her own such choir, AURALIA in Prague.

== Discography ==
Kiva has released three solo CDs featuring original compositions and her own style of overtone singing and recorded albums with a diverse range of artists.

Kiva's solo recordings include 1998's 'The Ladder', featuring thirteen originals by Kiva, one song co-written with Gary Taylor and one cover of a Bob Fuhr/ Larry Hicock song. Her 2004 album 'Pulse' features ten originals, including co-writes with Rhys Fulber, Nii Tettey Tetteh, John Hudson, Jay Stoller and Jordan Hanson. The third album, 'The Quality of Light', released December 2013 (with artist name adjusted to 'Kiva Simova') contains ten originals. It features an improvised piece co-written with didgeridoo player Ondrej Smeykal.

=== The Ladder (1998) – Yemyss Music (indie) ===
==== Tracks ====
1. Tuva on Rye
2. Untouchable
3. Gone Forever
4. Seven Years
5. The Big Picture
6. Egyptian Eyes
7. Venus and the Fly
8. Dare to Lose
9. The Flip Side
10. The Science Project
11. Heart Overboard
12. Interlude in Monkey Forest
13. On the Ganges
14. Freedom to Go
15. Regret

==== Musicians ====
- Kiva: vocals, piano, keyboards, percussion, jaw harp
- Gary Taylor: drums, percussion, keyboards, sampling
- Mike Bossy: bass
- John Gzowski: guitar
- Kevin Breit: guitar
- Rob Piltch: guitar
- Chris Bennett: guitar
- Oliver Schroer: violin (deceased 2008)
- Rob Gusevs: organ
- Bob Taillefer: pedal steel
- Anne Bourne: cello
- Dave Maurakis: cello
- Jim Casson: percussion

=== Pulse (2004) – Yemyss Music (indie) ===
==== Tracks ====
1. Sanctuary
2. Donde Soweika
3. Serendipity Doodah
4. Everything Goes
5. Morning Dew Ragu
6. The Incident
7. Firecracker Suite
8. That Zing
9. Kaida Kei
10. In the Flesh

==== Musicians ====
- Kiva: vocals, piano, keyboards
- John Hudson: percussion
- Heidi Hunter: acoustic harp
- Rodrigo Munoz: percussion
- Don Benedictson: bass
- Jay Stoller: percussion
- Richard Moody: viola
- Mahabub Khan: tabla, additional vocals
- Jane Miller: additional vocals
- Nii Tettey Tetteh: percussion, African flute
- Bill Spornitz: soprano saxophone
- Eli Herscovitch: clarinet
- Jordan Hanson & Batuque Ensemble: percussion

=== The Quality of Light (2014) – Yemyss Music (indie) ===
==== Tracks ====
1. Going Down
2. Sea Legs
3. The Endeared Ones
4. Bitter my Sweet
5. Just in Case
6. In Her Nature
7. Resurrected
8. Common Thread
9. The Opposite of Torture
10. Meeting in Dreamtime

==== Musicians ====
- Kiva Simova: vocals, grand piano, Wurlitzer keyboard
- Jim Casson: percussion
- Ian de Souza: electric bass
- George Koller: upright acoustic bass
- Lucy Fillery-Murphy: cello
- Ondrej Smeykal: didgeridoo

==== Professional reviews ====
- Steve Baylin, Ottawa Xpress

=== Recordings with other artists ===
- Live in Poughkeepsie, Crash Test Dummies, 1994 (keyboards, backup vocals)
- It's All Right, Xiao Ping Lee, 1996 (producer, arranger, backup vocals)
- Moksha, The New Millennium Orchestra, 1996 (harmonic overtoning)
- Dancing with the Living, Strange Angels, 1997 (keyboards, backup vocals)
- Circle of Days, The Ring Cycle, 1998 (harmonic overtoning, improvised vocals)
- Sin & other Salvations, The Wyrd Sisters, 2001 (keyboards, backup vocals)
- Waiting for Catherine, The Ormidales, 2008 (backup vocals)
- The Quality of Light, Live Ullmann, 2008 (lyrics & melody by Kiva, backup vocals)
- In These Arms- A Song for All Beings, Jennifer Berezan and Friends, 2011 (guest lead vocals)
- Jenny Robinson- http://www.jennyrobinson.ca Jenny Robinson 2016 (keyboards, backup vocals)
- Sweet Roses, Ilena Zaramba 2024 (featured overtone vocals)

=== Film Soundtracks ===
- Beit Sha'ar (Nomad's Home), 2010, by Iman Kamel
- Blood Pressure, 2012, by Sean Garrity
- Unless, 2016
- Sharkwater Extinction, 2018
- Act One, 2025
