= Jusqu'aux p'tites heures =

Jusqu’ aux p’tites heures

Studio album by La Bottine Souriante
- Released: 1991
- Recorded: 1991
- Genre: Folk
- Length: 49:48
- Label: Les Productions Mille-Pattes
- Producer: La Bottine Souriante

La Bottine Souriante chronology
J'voudrais changer d'chapeau (1988)	Jusqu’ aux p’tites heures (1991)	La Mistrine (1994)

Jusqu’ aux p’tites heures (English: "Until the wee hours") is a studio album by Canadian folk band La Bottine Souriante. Released in 1991, it contains an assortment of reels as well as traditional songs with the addition of modern instruments. The theme of alcohol is recurrent in this album. The album was certified Platinum by the CRIA in December 2002.

== Track listing ==
all songs arranged by La Bottine Souriante, except track 12, with additional arrangers specified.

1. "La chanson du quéteux" (Ovila Légaré - arranged by Jean Fréchette)
2. "Le reel de Pointe-au-Pic" (Traditional - arr. Denis Fréchette, J. Fréchette)
3. "Un p'tit coup mesdames" (Traditional)
4. "Nuit sauvage" (Michel Bordeleau - arr. J. Fréchette)
5. "Par un dimanche au soir (ou Ninette)" (Traditional - arr. J. Fréchette)
6. "L'Acadienne" (Traditional - arr. J. Fréchette)
7. "Émilien" (Raymond Lévesque - arr. J. Fréchette)
8. "Corps mort" (Traditional - arr. D. Fréchette, J. Fréchette) and "Fleur de Mandragore" (Bordeleau - arr. J. Fréchette)
9. "Turlutte des 33 voleurs" (Michel Faubert)
10. "Brandy Payette" (Traditional - arr. D. Fréchette, J. Fréchette)
11. "Picoro" (Traditional)
12. "«Dérap» de la guerre" (Yves Lambert)

== Personnel ==
- Régent Archambault, double bass, vocals
- Michel Bordeleau, mandolin, violin, guitar, snare drum, vocals
- Laflèche Doré, trumpet
- Robert Ellis, bass trombone
- Denis Fréchette, piano, piano accordion, vocals, brass arrangement
- Jean Fréchette, saxophone, brass arrangement
- Yves Lambert, melodeon, accordion, harmonica, vocals
- Martin Racine, violin, vocals, guitar, piano accordion
- André Verreault, trombone

== Credits ==
- Produced by Benjamin Kanters and La Bottine Souriante
- Engineered by Benjamin Kanters
- Assistant engineer: Isabelle Larin
- Assistant producer: André Marchand
- A&R: La Bottine Souriante
- Recorded and mixed at Studio St-Charles, Longueuil (Canada)
- Sleeve designer: Jean Bureau
- Photography: Pierre Guzzo
