= La Bottine Souriante =

Canadian folk band

- Origin: Lanaudière, Quebec, Canada
- Genres: Folk music
- Years active: 1976–present
- Website: www.bottinesouriante.com

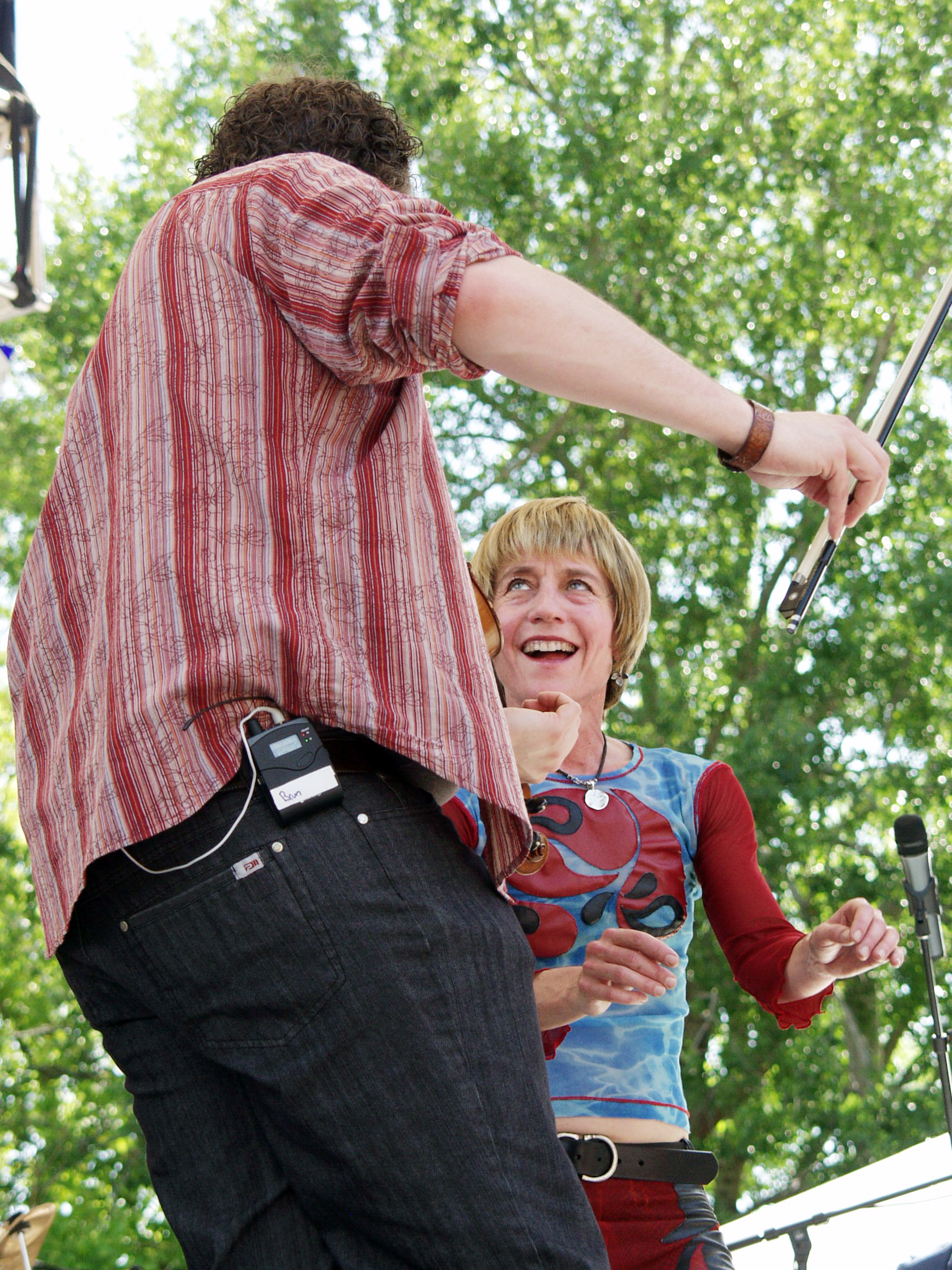
Fiddler (André Brunet) and dancer (Sandy Silva) during a performance at the 2006 Festival International de Louisiane.

La Bottine Souriante (LBS) is a folk band from Canada. The band specializes in traditional Québécois music, often with a modern twist.

Formed in 1976 in Joliette, Quebec, by Yves Lambert, Andre Marchand, and Mario Forest, they have toured extensively through Europe and North America. In 1990, the band integrated a four-piece horn section with traditional instruments, such as the accordion, fiddle, guitar, piano and double bass, in order to add an element of jazz to their music. In 1998, they contributed a song to the Canadian Celtic music compilation album by The Chieftains, Fire in the Kitchen.

The group's name means "the smiling boot", which refers to the appearance of a work boot with worn-out soles. This is both a reference to the band's working class roots, as well as the incorporation of boot-stomping in their music.

== Members ==
The line-up for LBS has changed numerous times (which is not unusual for folk groups), and its sound has evolved accordingly. The band started out with a very French Canadian feel with guitar, accordion and fiddle, but has expanded to include other styles and instruments. Although all of the founders have left the group, LBS continues to perform, and a new wave of young musicians joined the group in 2002.

LBS's current line-up is:

- Éric Beaudry (podorythmie, guitar, bouzouki, mandolin, (solo) vocals) 2002–
- David Boulanger (violin, podorythmie, percussion, vocals) 2007–
- Robert "Bob" Ellis (bass trombone, tuba, percussion) 1990–
- Jean Fréchette (saxophone, flute, penny whistle, clarinet, percussion, vocals) 1990–
- Jean-François Gagnon-Branchaud (violin, (solo) vocals, podorythmie, guitar, mandolin) 2011–
- Mathieu Gagné (electric bass, acoustic bass guitar) 2022–
- Jocelyn Lapointe (trumpet, flugelhorn) 1993–
- Olivier Salazar (keyboards, piano) 2022–
- Sandy Silva (percussive dance) 1998–
- Timi Turmel (accordion, vocals) 2023–
- André Verreault (trombone) 1990–

Past members include:

- Yves Lambert (accordion, jaw harp, harmonica, melodeon, (solo) vocals) 1976-2002 (founding member)
- André Marchand (guitar, feet, (solo) vocals) 1976–1990 (founding member)
- Mario Forest (spoons, harmonica, vocals) 1976–1979, 1980–1984 (founding member) (deceased)
- Gilles Cantin (guitar, feet, (solo) vocals) 1977–1981 (deceased)
- Jacques Landry (bones, bodhrán, fiddle) 1977
- Pierre Laporte (fiddle, (solo) vocals) 1977–1981
- Lisa Ornstein (piano, fiddle) 1979, the first woman to join the band
- Guy Bouchard (spoons, guitar, fiddle, vocals) 1980
- Martin Racine (guitar, mandolin, feet, fiddle, vocals) 1980–1997
- Daniel Roy (flageolet, jaw harp, bones, bodhrán, (solo) vocals) 1982–1985
- Bernard Simard (guitar, (solo) vocals) 1984–1986
- Michel Bordeleau (snare drum, guitar, mandolin, feet, fiddle, (solo) vocals) 1987–2002
- Régent Archambault (double bass, electric bass, vocals) 1988–2008
- Denis Fréchette (piano accordion, flugelhorn, piano, trumpet, vocals) 1988–1999 (deceased)
- Laflèche Doré (flugelhorn, trumpet) 1990–1993 (deceased)
- André Brunet (violin, guitar, vocals, podorythmie, percussion) 1997–2006
- Pierre "Pedro" Bélisle (keyboards, piano accordion, piano, trumpet) 2000–2021
- Pierre-Luc Dupuis (vocals, accordion, harmonica) 2002–2008
- François Marion (electric bass, acoustic bass guitar)2009–2022
- Benoît Bourque (accordion, bones, podorythmie, vocals) 2009–2022
- Louis-Simon Lemieux (vocals, accordion, harmonica, podorythmie) 2013–2023 (alternating)

Guest players

- Dominique D'Haiti (fiddle) on Je voudrais changer de chapeau
- Ron di Lauro (trumpet, flugelhorn) on La Mistrine
- Michel Dupire (percussion) on La Mistrine
- Jacques Landry (bodhrán, bones) on La traverse de l'Atlantique
- Danielle Martineau (piano) on La traverse de l'Atlantique
- Dominique Messier (drums) on La Mistrine
- Lisa Ornstein (fiddle, piano) on Les Épousailles, Chic & Swell and Je voudrais changer de chapeau
- Anne Perrot (cello) on Je voudrais changer de chapeau
- Daniel Plamondon (viola) on Je voudrais changer de chapeau
- Daniel Roy (spoon) (bones) on Les Épousailles

== Discography ==
Albums

- Y'a ben du changement (1978) – (Gold)
- Les Épousailles (1980)
- Chic 'n Swell (1982)
- La Traversée de l'Atlantique (1986)
- Tout comme au jour de l'An (1987) – (Platinum)
- Je voudrais changer d'chapeau (1988)
- Jusqu'aux p'tites heures (1992) – (Platinum)
- La Mistrine (1994)
- En spectacle (1996)
- Xième (1998, also released in the United States as Rock 'n Reel) – (Gold)
- Cordial (2001)
- Anthologie (2001) – (Gold)
- J'ai jamais tant ri (2003)
- Anthologie II, 1976-2005 (2006)
- Appellation d'origine contrôlée (2011)
- danse (2019)
- Domino! (2023)

Contributing artist

- The Rough Guide to the Music of Canada (2005)

== Awards and achievements ==
La Bottine Souriante has received the Canadian Juno award for Best Roots & Traditional Album on three occasions for Je voudrais changer d'chapeau in 1989, Jusqu'aux p'tites heures in 1992, and Cordial in 2002. They have also received several Félix Awards from the Quebec recording industry: four Best Folk Album of the Year awards for Jusqu'aux p'tites heures in 1992, La Mistrine in 1995, En spectacle in 1997, and Xième in 1999, two Best Traditional Album awards for Cordial in 2002 and J'ai jamais tant ri in 2004, and one Best Sound (Technical) of the Year award in 1993. Furthermore, they have received four gold records for Y'a ben du changement, En spectacle, Xième, and Anthologie and three platinum records for Tout comme au jour de l'An, Jusqu'aux p'tites heures, and La Mistrine. They are known for their high energy live performances and in 2000 were voted Best Live Act at the BBC Radio 2 Folk Awards. BBC Radio 3 has also played their music in mainstream programmes.

== See also ==
- Music of Canada
- Music of Quebec
- List of bands from Canada
