= The Paperboys =

Canadian folk music band

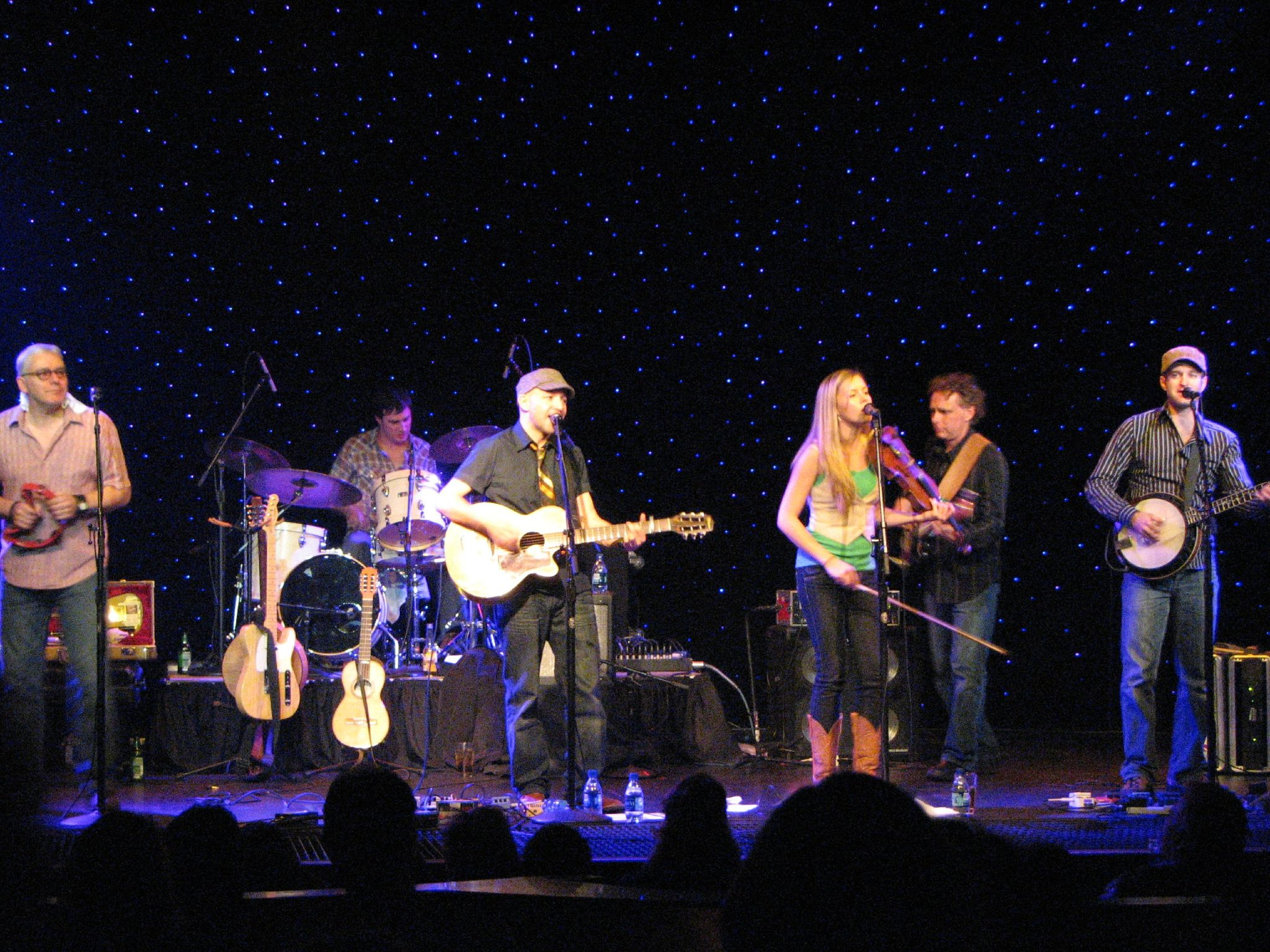
- The Paperboys performing at The Triple Door in Seattle, Washington, 2007

Background information
- Origin: Vancouver, Canada
- Genres: Folk rock, world music
- Years active: 1991–present
- Members: Tom Landa; Brad Gillard; Kalissa Landa; Geoffrey Kelly; Sam Esecson; Kareem Kandi; Nick LaRiviere; Miguelito Valdes; Greg Lyons
- Past members: Chris Jonat; Jeremy Hughes; Kevin Ball; David Plenkovich; Glenn Kruger; Moritz Behm; Neil Burnett; Paul Lawton; Steve Mitchell; Cam Salay; Shona Le Mottée; Shannon Saunders; Hanz Araki; Doug Schmidt; Alan Macleod; Tom Neville; Victor Smith; Matt Brain; Kendel Carson; Miranda Mulholland
- Website: paperboys.com

The Paperboys (sometimes billed and credited as Tom Landa and the Paperboys) are a Canadian folk music band from Vancouver that formed in 1991. The Paperboys blend Celtic folk with bluegrass, Mexican, Eastern European, African, zydeco, soul, and country influences. The band has had a variety of members and line-ups since its original formation, with Landa remaining as the sole founding member, although veteran banjoist/bassist Cam Salay often returns as a guest performer. Known for consistently creating pop songs with melodic hooks, their music has been called versatile, with a wide range of influences, melding diverse musical influences more successfully than some other Irish rock bands have previously.

The Paperboys first studio album, Late As Usual, was released on their own record label Stompy Discs in 1995. They also created Stomp Productions to produce and market their work themselves. Their first three studio albums have received Juno Award nominations, with 1997's Molinos winning for the Roots and Traditional Album of the Year category. They also won a West Coast Music Award the same year.

Their album Postcards won a West Coast Music Award in 2000.

After the untimely death of drummer Paul Lawton, The Paperboys helped to finance a scholarship in his name. The band has also appeared in and scored award-winning international films. They are noted for their version of Bob Dylan's "All Along the Watchtower", which was part of a tribute album for Dylan's 60th birthday. Their most recent release, and seventh album, was 2014's At Peace With One's Ghosts.

A staple at folk, roots, and bluegrass festivals in North America and Europe, The Paperboys have extensively toured both continents, performing in England, Germany, Switzerland, Norway, Scotland, Ireland, France, and Austria. Frequently featured on Canadian national television, The Paperboys have said in the past, "We get paid for the travel time, but play for free."

== Formation and roster ==
The Paperboys were originally formed in 1991 by bassist Christopher Jonat and Tom Landa on acoustic guitar and vocals, with Jeremy Hughes on accordion and vocals, Kevin Ball on fiddle, and Dave Plenkovich on drums. This early version of the band was very popular with the Vancouver college crowds, but after creative discrepancies Landa kept the Paperboys name, and all the other remaining band members reformed as The Clumsy Lovers.

Tom Landa was born in Mexico to a Canadian mother of Irish ancestry and a Mexican father, and later moved from Mexico City to Vancouver, British Columbia. Initially, Landa discovered Celtic music via the Canadian band Spirit of the West, whose flautist and co-vocalist was Geoffrey Kelly. Kelly would later produce half of The Paperboys' first studio album Late as Usual with Colin Nairne (producer and guitarist for Barney Bentall) and eventually end up joining the band full-time.

The original Late As Usual band members included Moritz Behm on fiddle, Neil Burnett on vocals, penny whistle, and celtic harp, Glenn Kruger (the Stoaters, Real McKenzies) on drums and vocals, and Cam Salay on banjo and bass. In 1995, the band was later joined by Shona Le Mottée on fiddle, and Shannon Saunders on a variety of instruments (bass, fiddle, banjo), to contribute to the band's live shows. Le Mottée left The Paperboys in 1997, after recording the award-winning Molinos, and was replaced by flautist Hanz Araki. In the late 1990s, they were joined for a time by keyboardist Doug Schmidt.

In 2010, the band consisted of Landa, Kalissa Hernandez on fiddle, Brad Gillard on banjo and bass, Geoffrey Kelly on flutes, and Sam Esecson on drums, with a three-piece horn section consisting of Kareem Kandi on saxophone, Nick LaRiviere on trombone, and either Miguelito Valdes or Greg Lyons on trumpet.

== Recording history ==
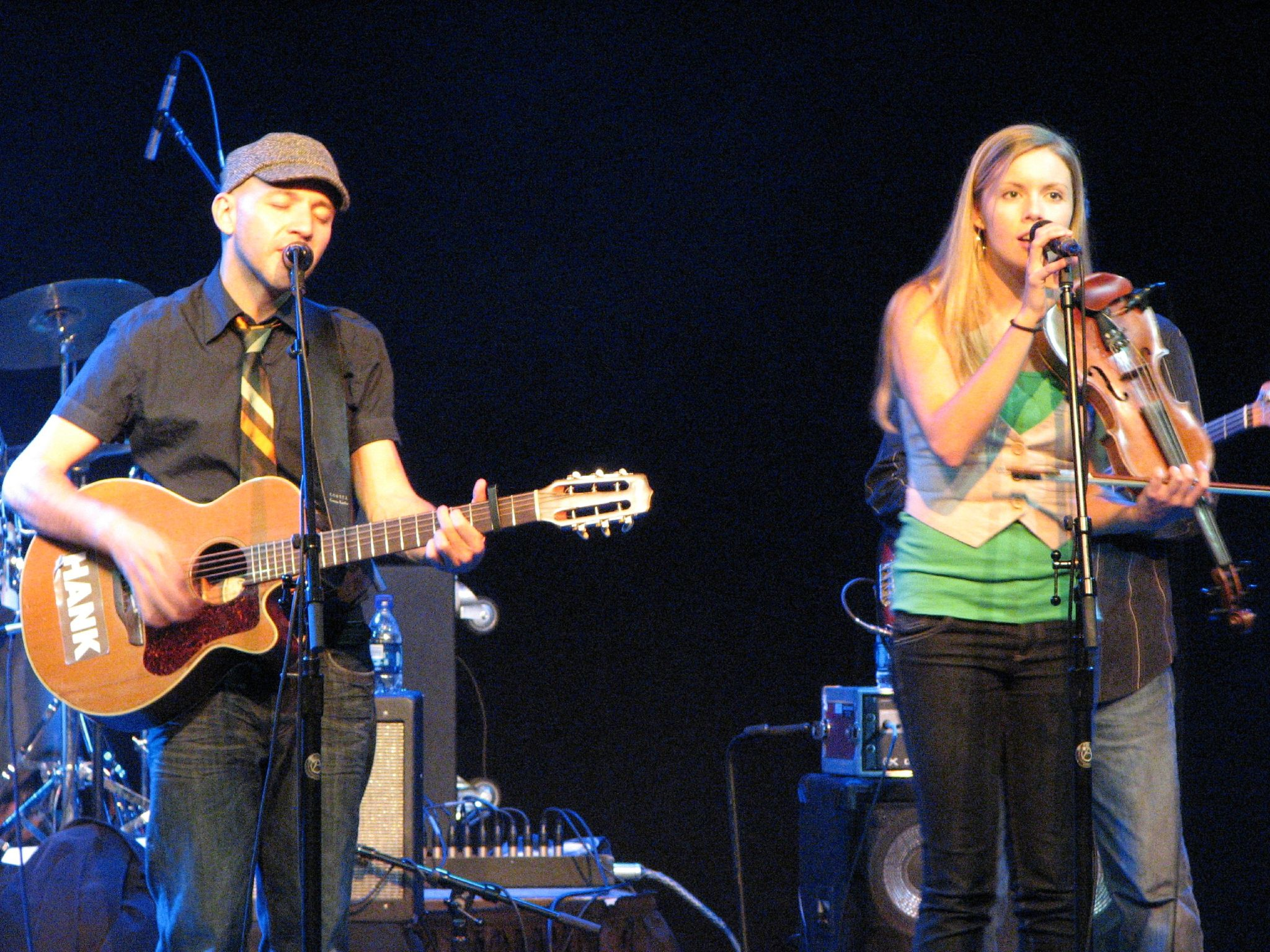
Tom Landa, lead singer, and Kendel Carson, on fiddle

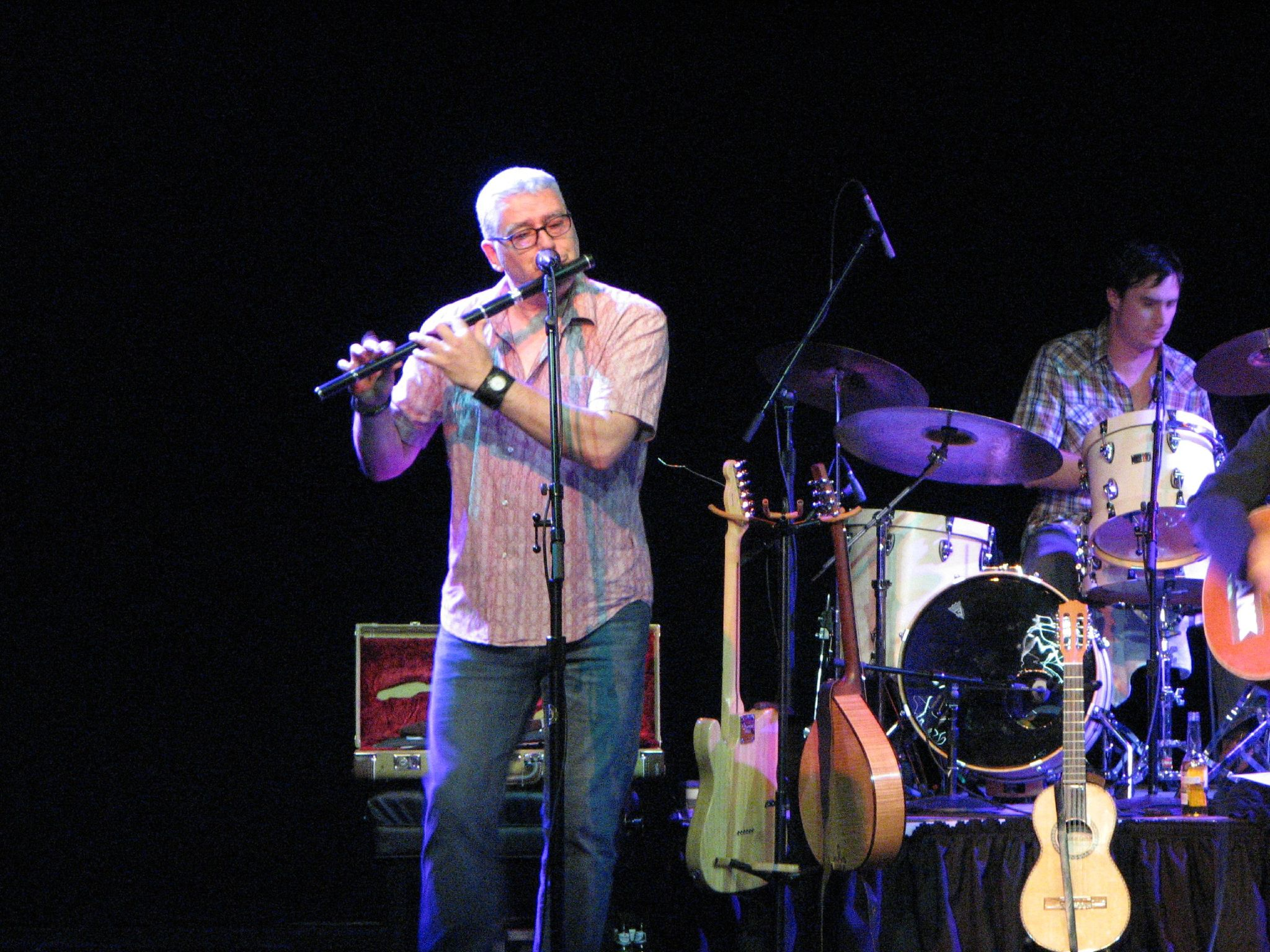
Geoffrey Kelley on flute, and Matt Brain on drums

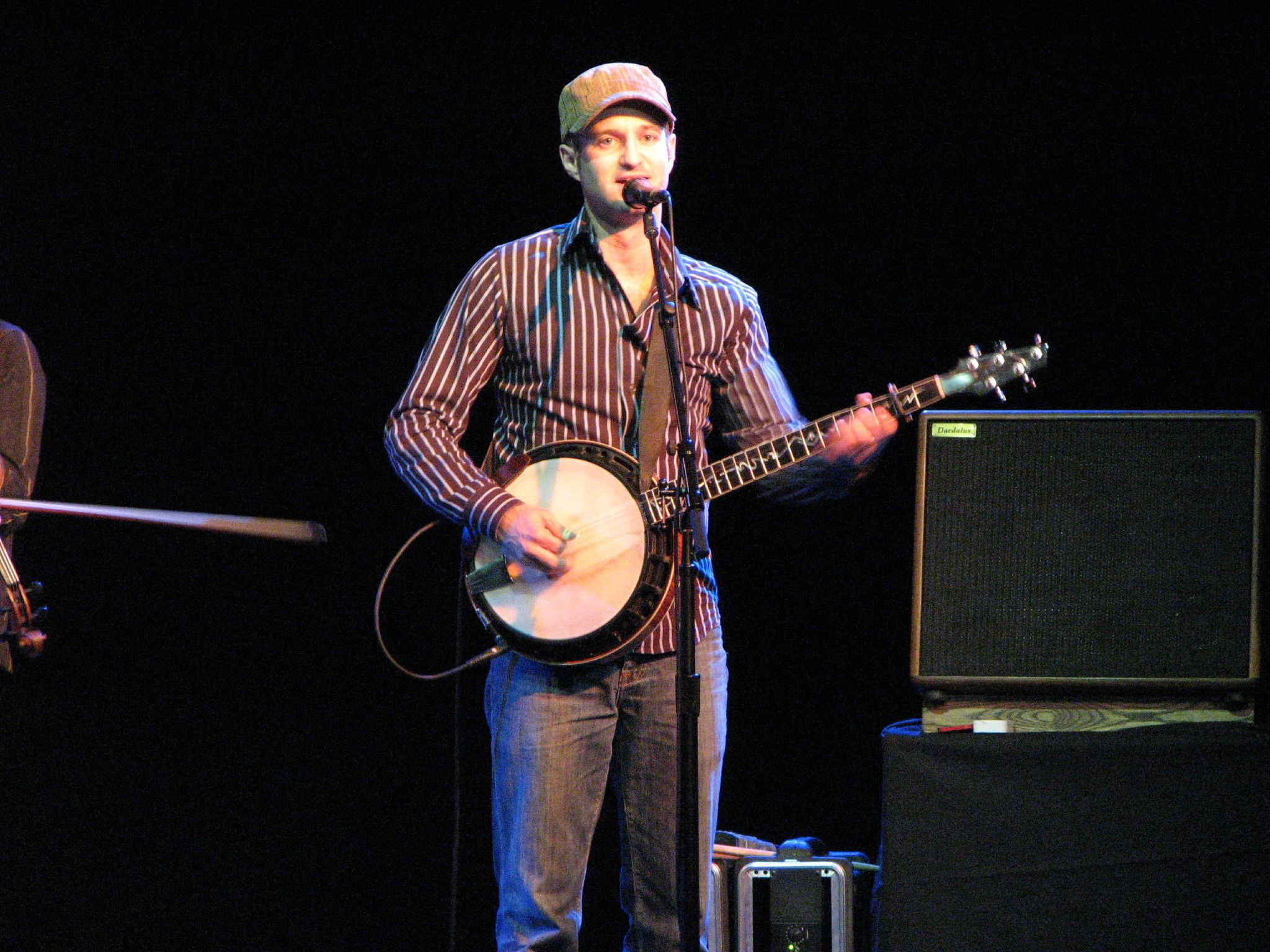
Brad Gillard playing the banjo

The Paperboys released a cassette album called January in 1993 as their first commercially available recording, and sold many copies at local shows around their hometown of Vancouver. Those original recordings were never released on CD (except for the track "Judy's Wedding", which is featured on Tenure), but a few of the songs from January ("January", "Come Tella Me") were re-recorded by the new lineup for the Late As Usual CD.

The Paperboys released their first CD studio album, Late as Usual, in 1994, on their self-established label Stompy Discs, with an associated production and management company, Stomp Productions. Late as Usual went on to garner a Juno Award nomination for Roots and Traditional Album of the Year. They followed that album with 1997's Molinos, which also was nominated for the Roots and Traditional category at the Juno Awards, this time winning. Additionally, Molinos took away the Best Roots Recording category in the West Coast Music Award of the same year. One review referred to Molinos as "bluegrass-tinged pop-rock" with an "undercurrent of Celtic wildness". In 2000, The Paperboys released Postcards, their third studio album, which also was nominated in the same category, for their third straight nomination, but Postcards did not win. In 2000, they won another West Coast Music Award for the Best Roots Recording category for Postcards.

They followed next with Tenure in 2002, the double album Dilapidated Beauty in 2003, and The Road to Ellenside in 2006. In a review for Molinos, it was noted that The Paperboys consistently write pop songs with melodic hooks, which other prior Irish-rock inspired bands such as The Pogues and Oysterband, and others were not always successful at. Postcards, which has songs that range musically from bluegrass, zydeco, flamenco, Irish traditional, country, to Celtic-new-age-Native, and with songs that mix some of the themes, was described as a satisfying example of how far the versatile scope of The Paperboys' music extends.

The Paperboys' 2006 album, The Road to Ellenside, is named after the English mansion, Ellenside, Lake District near Ireby where the band, together with producer and engineer Mark Tucker, recorded the album. After a performance in the area, a fan invited the band to spend the night in her mansion for dinner. Landa told her that the home would be an amazing place to record a record, to which the fan replied, "Why not?" One year later, they returned to the Ellenside mansion, living there in Cumbrian countryside full-time while recording their studio album. Additional recording work for The Road to Ellenside was done at the Tragically Hip's studio in Bath, England and in Vancouver. On The Road to Ellenside, The Paperboys covered Sting's song Fragile from his 1987 album …Nothing Like the Sun. The band had intended to film their music video for the track in Cuba, but because of high insurance costs from American companies due to the United States embargo against Cuba, opted to film in Morelia, Mexico.

In 2009, the band released Callithump. This release features the band name "Los Paperboys" on the front cover, although this is not the official new band name.

== Live performances and other work ==
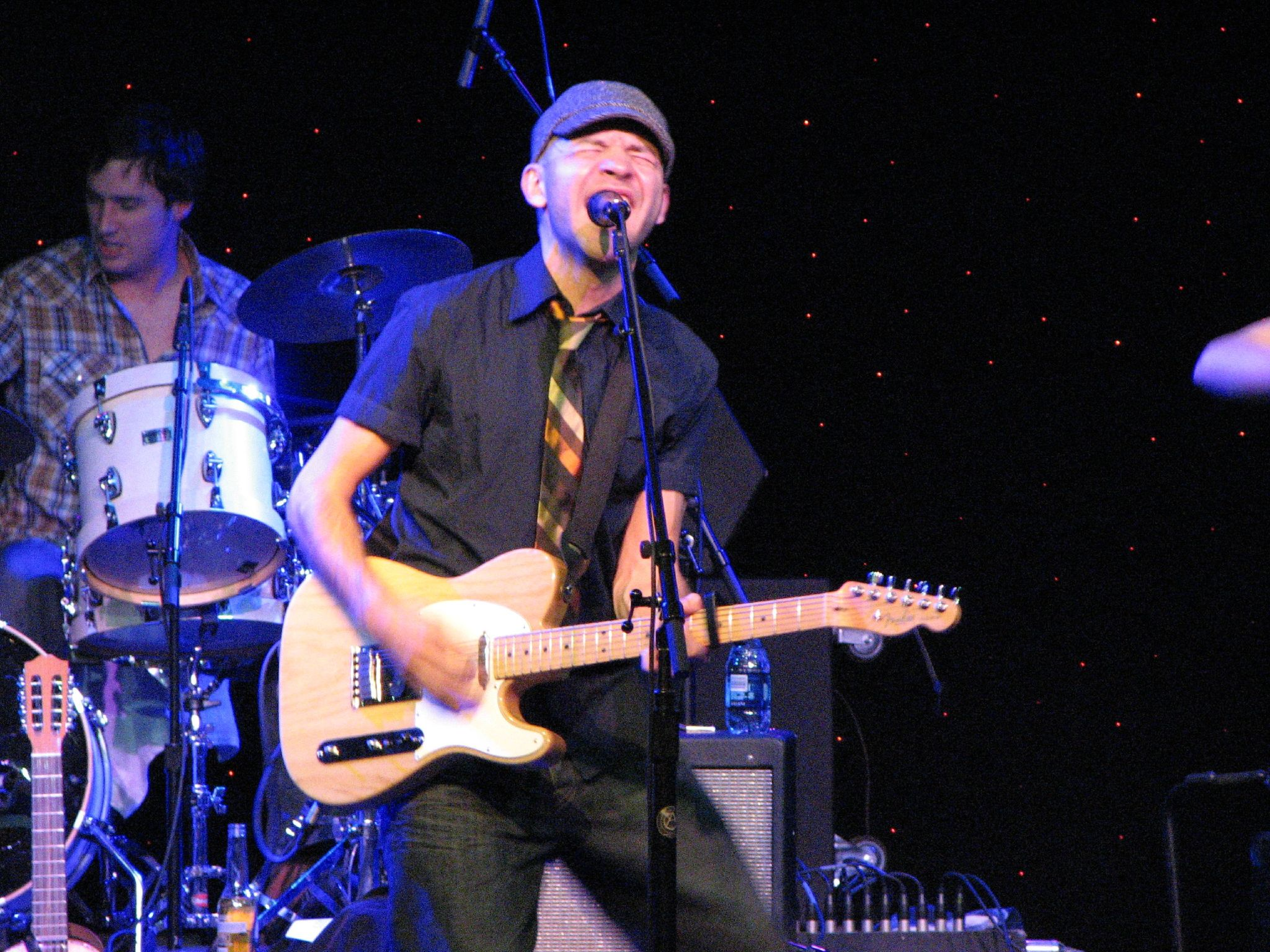
Landa performs Sting's song Fragile

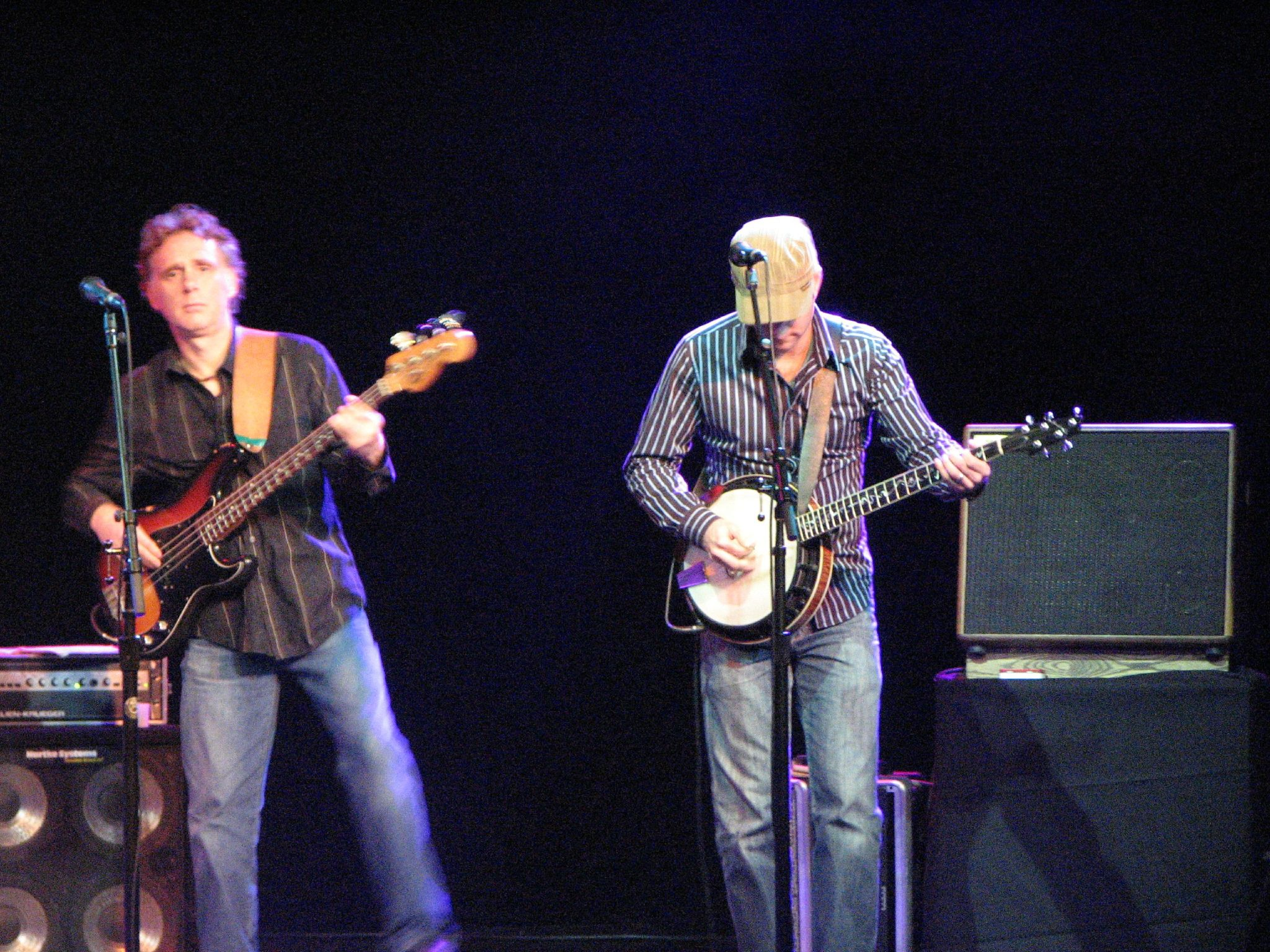
Cam Salay plays bass, as Gillard plays the banjo

The Paperboys have performed and appeared in the Genie Award nominated film Marine Life, for which Landa also wrote the musical score, and in the Genie Award winning Lunch with Charles, which was the first-ever film co-production between Hong Kong and Canada. The band have also made numerous appearances on Canadian national television. The band has performed and been interviewed on Vicki Gabereau, The Mike Bullard Show, The Jim Byrnes Show, Urban Rush, Worldbeats, and CBC Television's Terminal City.

In 2001, the Red House Records label asked The Paperboys to contribute a track to A Nod to Bob, a 60th birthday homage to Bob Dylan. Their rendition of "All Along the Watchtower" was consistently noted in reviews as one of the highlights of the album. In honor of their former drummer, Paul Lawton, who passed on suddenly in 2005, the band worked on recording ten songs written by him, for a tribute album that would include recorded material by Lawton. Following Lawton's death, a scholarship was created in his name. The Paul Lolly Lawton Scholarship Fund, was established by St. Clair College in Windsor, Ontario, and The Paperboys worked with the Ontario Provincial Government to raise funds for it.

The Paperboys routinely sell out shows in some of the most popular and prestigious clubs and festivals throughout Canada, the United States, Mexico and Europe. One of their most notable appearances was being asked to perform at John F. Kennedy Center for the Performing Arts in Washington D.C. In Canada, The Paperboys appeared at almost every folk festival across the country, including Edmonton, Vancouver, Winnipeg and Toronto. They have also played festivals across the United States, including New York's Falcon Ridge Folk Festival, The Folk Alliance Festival, the New England Folk Festival and Seattle's Bumbershoot. The Paperboys have also performed at other music festivals, including Toronto's Harbourfront, the Milwaukee Irish Fest, and Wintergrass. The band has been asked to return almost every year to several festivals across Europe, headlining at the United Kingdom's Warwick and Trowbridge festivals, as well as at festivals in Germany and Denmark. The band has also toured in Switzerland, Norway, Scotland, Ireland, France, and Austria. According to Landa, their European travels are some of their most successful and popular performances, explaining why they travel to Europe so frequently for long musical tours.

The Paperboys' live performances have been described as high energy and accessible, and they have a reputation for gaining new fans after a single performance. The loyalty of fans to The Paperboys has been previously described as "a growing cult-like following in recent years."

== Musical style and influences ==
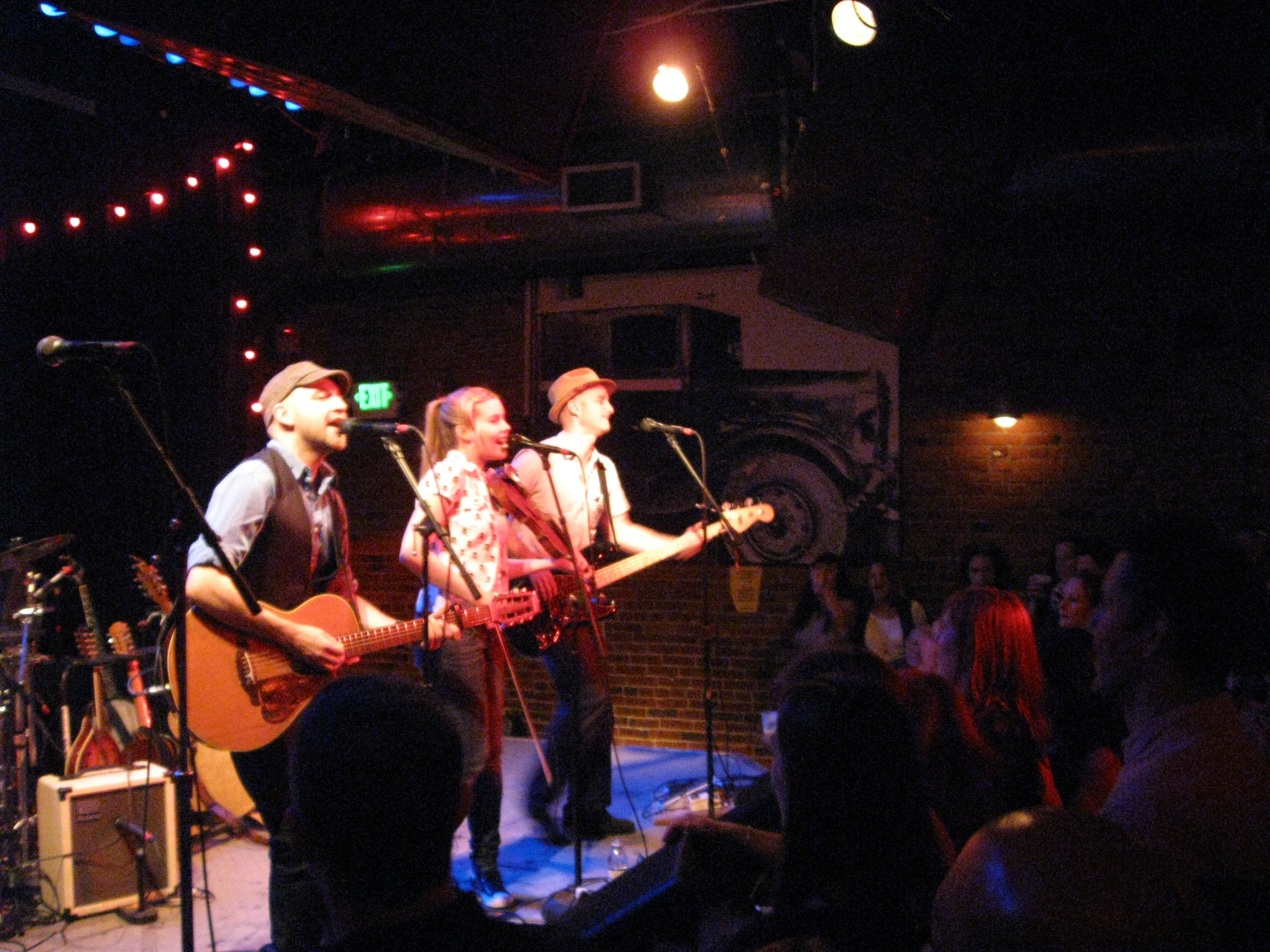
At the Tractor Tavern in Seattle

The Washington Post and Billboard have referred to The Paperboys' music as "reminiscent of early Elton John and Van Morrison", and they have also been compared at times to a "laid back country version" of The Eagles. While their music is sometimes hard to describe, The Paperboys themselves have described it as "Guinness with a tequila chaser while listening to an Americana Jukebox." Other descriptions of The Paperboys have described a fusion of Celtic folk with Bluegrass, Mexican, Eastern European, African, zydeco, soul, and country influences. Their songs range from traditional Celtic jigs to modern love songs. Landa has said that one of his own stronger influences in music is the Mexican style of music called Son Jarocho, whose most well-known song is Ritchie Valens's La Bamba. Tom Landa's songwriting has been cited as world-class by Chris Nickerson of the Seattle Weekly.

The band has also been noted for recording a number of pop and rock covers — including The Beatles' "I've Just Seen a Face" on Molinos and Sting's "Fragile" on The Road to Ellenside — which incorporate traditional Celtic jigs and reels into the arrangements; "Fragile", additionally, incorporates lyrics from both the English and Spanish versions of the song.

According to Landa, his bandmate Geoffrey Kelley's other band, Spirit of the West, is a major influence on himself and The Paperboys. Landa said, "Even when playing with (Geoffrey), and him being in the same room, I will still say they were a very big influence on me. I'd almost dare to say that had it not been my hearing their records, I would never have been into Celtic music to begin with -- so the band may not even exist."

== Personnel ==
=== Current members ===
- Tom Landa - vocals, guitar, bouzouki, mandolin (1991–present)
- Geoffrey Kelly - flute, tambourine (1998–present)
- Brad Gillard - vocals, banjo, bass guitar (2005–present)
- Sam Esecson - drums, percussion (2009–present)
- Kalissa Landa - vocals, fiddle (2009–present)
- Kareem Kandi - saxophone (2009–present)
- Nick LaRiviere - trombone (2010–present)
- Miguelito Valdes - trumpet, congas, percussion (2010–present)
- Greg Lyons - trumpet (2010–present)

=== Former members ===
- Christopher Jonat - vocals, bass guitar (1991–1993)
- Jeremy Hughes - accordion (1991–1993)
- Kevin Ball - fiddle (1991–1993)
- David Plenkovich - drums (1991–1993)
- Paul Lawton - drums, percussion (1994–2000; died 2005)
- Cam Salay - vocals, bass guitar, banjo (1994–2005)
- Matt Brain - drums, percussion (2005–2009)
- Shannon Saunders - vocals, fiddle, banjo (1995–2005)
- Neil Burnett - flute, tin whistle, accordion, percussion (1994–1995)
- Moritz Behm - vocals, fiddle, mandolin, percussion (1994–1995)
- Shona Le Mottée - fiddle (1995–1997)
- Hanz Araki - fiddle, flute (1996–1999)
- Kendel Carson - fiddle (2005–2009)
- Tom Neville - fiddle (1993–1994?)

== Discography ==
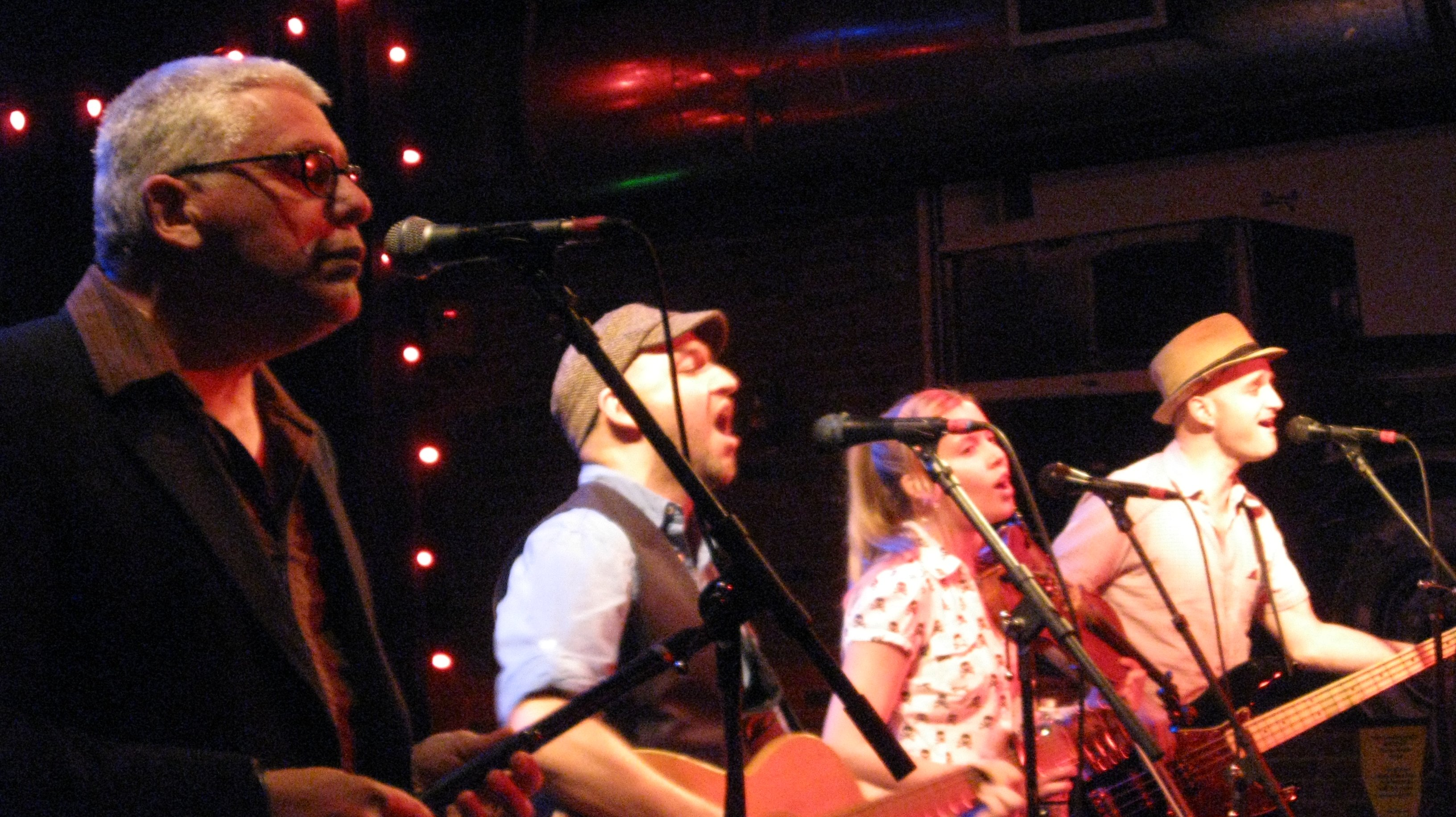
Performing the song "California" from The Road to Ellenside

- January (1993)
- Late as Usual (1995)
- Molinos (1997), Allmusic
- Postcards (2000), Allmusic
- Tenure (2002)
- Dilapidated Beauty (2003)
- The Road to Ellenside (2006)
- Live at Stockfisch Studio LP (2008)
- Live at Stockfisch Studio CD (2008)
- Callithump (2009)
- Live - Across The Water, Across The Land (2012)
- At Peace With One's Ghosts (2014)
- Score (2016)

== Awards and nominations ==
- 2001 Juno Awards, Best Roots & Traditional Album - Group, Postcards (nominated)
- 2000 West Coast Music Award, Best Roots Recording, Postcards (winner)
- 1998 Juno Awards, Best Roots & Traditional Album - Group, Molinos (winner)
- 1998 West Coast Music Award, Best Roots Recording, Molinos (winner)
- 1996 Juno Awards, Best Roots & Traditional Album - Group, Late As Usual (nominated)
