= Leahy =

Canadian folk group originating from Lakefield, Ontario

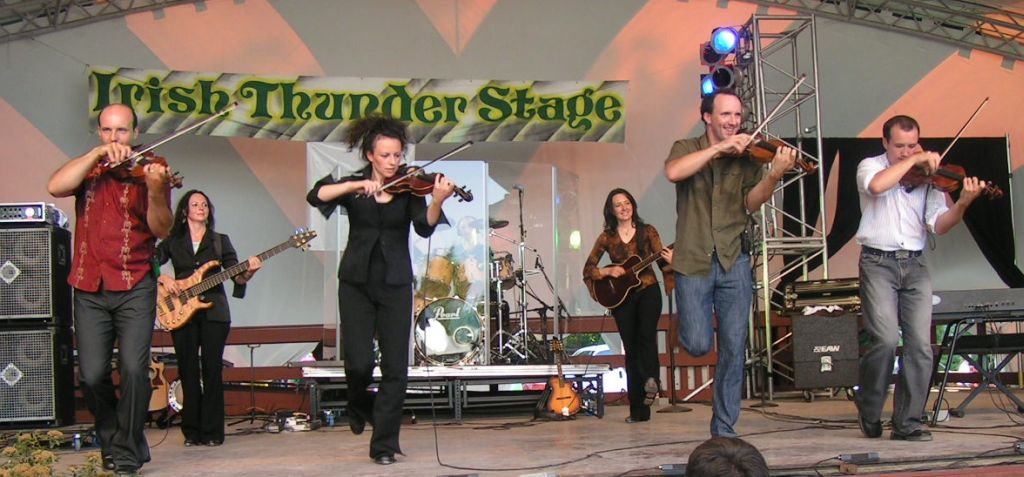
- Leahy performing in 2005

Background information
- Origin: Lakefield, Ontario, Canada
- Genres: Folk/Country/Celtic
- Years active: 1980s–present
- Label: Virgin Records
- Members: Donnell Leahy; Erin Leahy; Angus Leahy; Maria Leahy; Siobheann Donohue; Doug Leahy; Agnes Enright; Frank Leahy
- Past members: Denise Leahy; Chrissie Leahy; Julie Leahy
- Website: www.leahymusic.ca

Leahy is a Canadian folk music group. The eight band members, all from the Leahy family of 11 siblings, are from Lakefield, Ontario, and have been touring Canada and internationally since the early 1980s, when they were known as The Leahy Family. In 1985, they were the subject of a short film entitled Leahy: Music Most of All which received an Academy Award in the category of "Best Foreign Student Film." The members of Leahy take significant pride in their Irish roots and Canadian upbringing.

The line-up of the group varies depending upon the availability of its members, who are present or absent due to marriage, childrearing and other obligations. During the 1980s and early 1990s, the band recorded a number of privately released LPs and cassettes (most of which used the same title, The Leahy Family) which were sold at their concerts and they were frequent guests at the Big Valley Jamboree concerts in Saskatchewan and Alberta.

In 1997, the band resumed recording with their "relaunch" album, Leahy which also introduced the group's new branding. Leahy was an instrumental album, but the band also includes vocal performances in their live performances and subsequent albums have included both vocals and instrumentals.

Despite their established history, they were awarded two Juno awards in 1998, for Best New Group and Best Instrumental Artist. The following year, Leahy took a third Juno Award, for Best Country Group or Duo. Also in 1998, Leahy were added as the opening act for Canadian country singer Shania Twain's 1998 Come on Over Tour and were featured in two television specials from the tour, Live and The Specials, performing with Twain on the song "Don't Be Stupid (You Know I Love You)".

The group's members are both instrumentalists and dancers, with several members skilled in fiddle-playing (most notably the band's most famous member, Donnell). The female members of the band often perform step-dancing-style routines and do most of the singing.

== Members ==
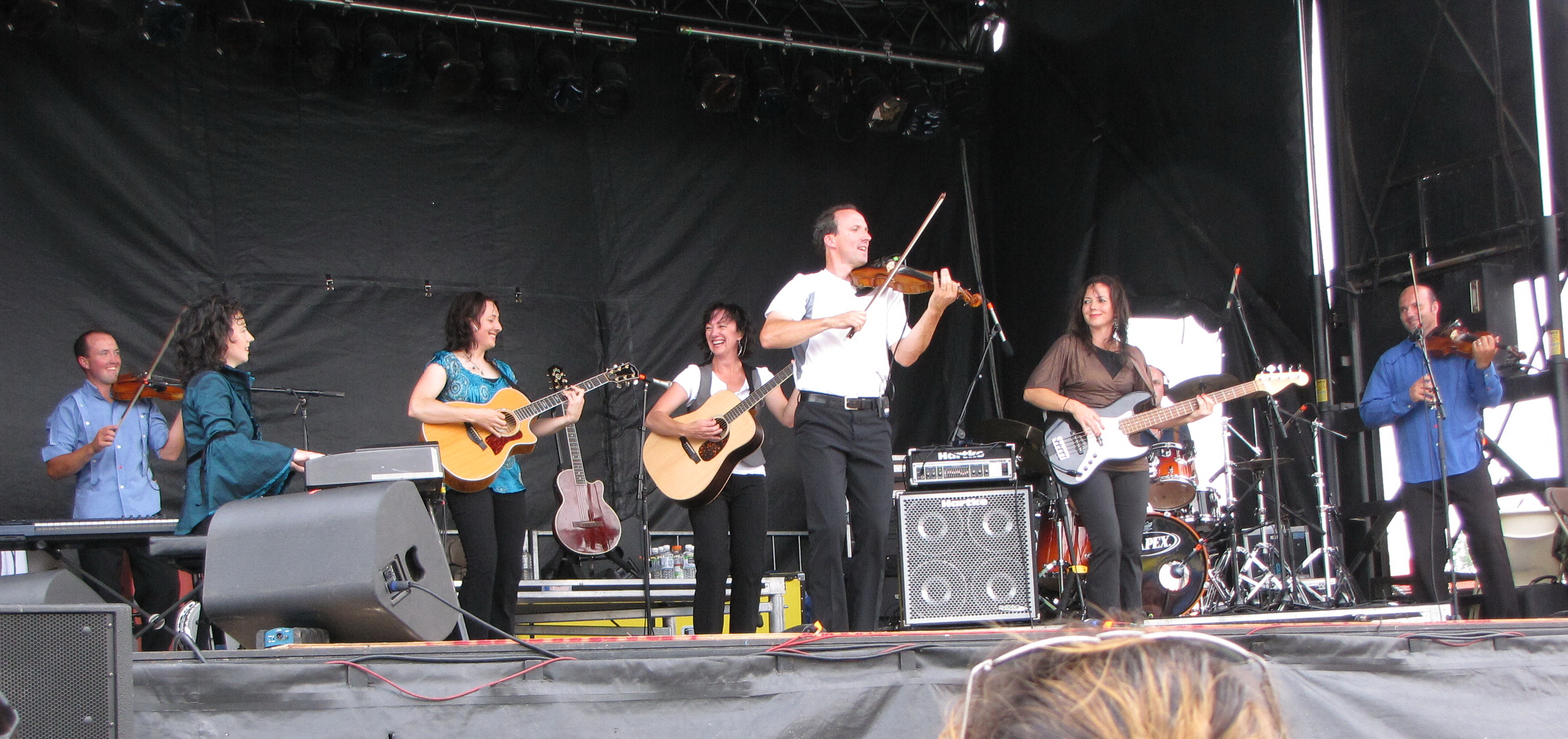
Leahy in concert at the Fergus Scottish Festival in 2009

All members of the band are siblings. Each member has a main role to play in the band; although most play more than one instrument and all step dance. Donnell Leahy is married to Cape Breton fiddler Natalie MacMaster and Frank is married to champion step dancer Chanda Gibson.

In 2008, Donnell Leahy and Natalie MacMaster were awarded honorary doctorate degrees by Trent University.

- Donnell Leahy — Fiddle
- Erin Leahy — Piano, Guitar, Fiddle, Mandolin, Vocals, Bass
- Angus Leahy — Fiddle
- Maria Leahy — Guitar, Banjo, Vocals
- Siobheann Donohue (née Leahy) — Bass, Vocals, Fiddle
- Doug Leahy — Fiddle
- Denise Flack (née Leahy) — Vocals
- Frank Leahy — Drums

These three sisters are not currently active in the band's touring schedule.

- Agnes Enright (née Leahy) — Keyboards, Step dancer, Vocals
- Chrissie Quigley (née Leahy) — Keyboards
- Julie Leahy — Vocals

== Discography ==
=== Albums ===
Year	Album	Chart Positions		CRIA
Year	Album	CAN Country	CAN	CRIA
1996	Leahy	1	36	Platinum
2001	Lakefield			
2004	In All Things			
2006	Leahy Live			
2007	Handmade			
2021	Good Water			

In addition, the group released several vinyl LPs and cassettes in the 1980s as The Leahy Family. These self-titled releases were privately pressed and usually sold at their concerts, although Christmas with the Leahy Family was carried by retailers such as A&B Sound.

=== Singles ===
Year	Title	Chart Positions		Album
Year	Title	CAN Country	CAN AC	Album
1986	"You've Got the Fiddle (I've Got the Bow)"	52		On the Move
1997	"The Call to Dance"	26	31	Leahy
1997	"B Minor"			Leahy
2001	"Down That Road"			Lakefield
2001	"Mission"			Lakefield
2004	"Chasing Rain"			In All Things
2004	"Coyote Way"			In All Things

=== Music videos ===
Year	Video
1997	"The Call to Dance"
1997	"B Minor"
2001	"Down That Road"
2001	"Mission"
2004	"Chasing Rain"
