= Podorythmie =

French Canadian method of tapping one's feet during musical performances

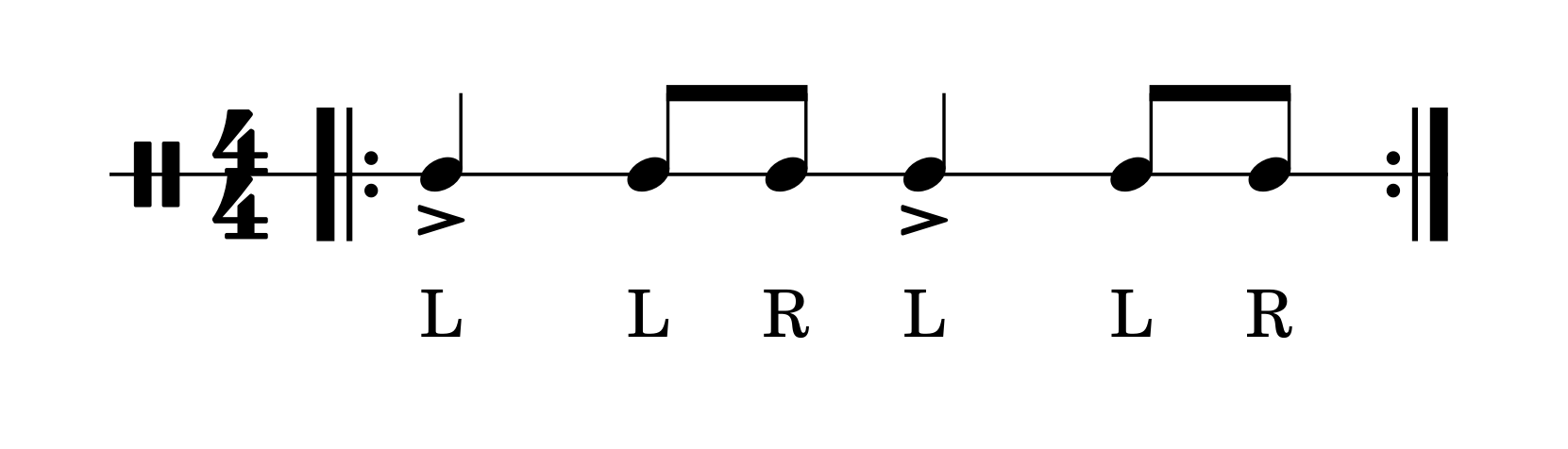
Notation of a typical 4/4 podorythmie rhythm

Podorythmie is a traditional French Canadian method of tapping one's feet during musical performances, which is a common practice in Québécois and Acadian music, and to a lesser extent, Canadian folk music as a whole. It is a percussion technique that uses the feet as a musical instrument to produce sound by hitting the feet on the floor. This technique is especially common during fiddle performances.

== Shoes and equipment ==
In order to produce a sound that is loud enough to be heard over the music, special boards and shoes are often employed by the performer. Shoes with wooden heels or leather soles generally have a desirable sound. Sometimes, the artist will use taps or fibreglass added to the toes and heels to create a louder sound. Contact microphones or specially crafted amplified boards (such as stomp boxes) are used in professional stage productions to augment the volume of the foot percussion.
