= Leahy (album) =

Studio album by Leahy
- Released: 1996
- Genre: Folk
- Length: 43:42
- Label: Virgin
- Producer: Lance Anderson

Leahy chronology
Leahy (1996)	Lakefield (2001)

Professional ratings
Review scores
Source	Rating
Allmusic	4.5/5 stars

Leahy is an album by Canadian folk music group Leahy. It was released by Virgin Records in 1996. The album peaked at number 1 on the RPM Country Albums chart in July 1997.

== Track listing ==
1. "B Minor" (Traditional) – 3:55
2. "Cape Breton Medley" (R. Cooper, Wiley Hunter, Jr., Traditional) – 5:11
3. "McBrides" (Dónal Lunny, Declan Sinnott) – 4:15
4. "The French" (Traditional) – 4:39
5. "The Call to Dance" (Gordon Duncan, Howie MacDonald) – 4:05
6. "Alabama" (G. Cahn, Ned Landry, J. Yeffen) – 3:40
7. "Don Messer Medley" (Don Messer, Traditional) – 3:05
8. "Csárdás" (Traditional) – 4:04
9. "Colm Quigley" (Donnell Leahy, Traditional) – 6:02
10. "The Coulin" (Traditional) – 4:44

== Chart performance ==
Chart (1997)	Peak position
Canadian RPM Country Albums	1
Canadian RPM Top Albums	36
