= Tin Type =

EP by Elliott Brood
- Released: 2004
- Genre: Alternative country
- Label: Weewerk

Elliott Brood chronology
Tin Type (2004)	Ambassador (2005)

Tin Type is the six-song debut EP from Toronto's alternative country group Elliott Brood. It was released in January 2004 on the independent music label Weewerk.

The album came packaged in a small brown paper bag, which in place of liner notes contained a handmade photo-book, done in a style reminiscent of the American Old West. The music was pressed on a non standard 80-mm disc, which the band jokes is known for ruining car stereos.

In conjunction with the band's tenth anniversary, the EP was reissued in 2013 on Paper Bag Records, with three new bonus tracks.

== Track listing ==
1. "Bowling Green"
2. "Oh, Alberta"
3. "Edge of Town"
4. "Only at Home"
5. "Cadillac Dust"
6. "Riding in Time"
7. "The Trail" (bonus track on 2013 edition)
8. "Rusty Nail" (bonus track on 2013 edition)
9. "Cranes" (bonus track on 2013 edition)
