= Clumsy Lovers =

Canadian band

The Clumsy Lovers are a folk rock/bluegrass/Celtic jam band formed in Vancouver, British Columbia with more than 2500 performances in the United States and Canada. The 2015 line-up consists of Jason Homey on banjo and mandolin, Jeff Leonard on bass guitar and vocals, Chandra Johnson on fiddle and vocals, Devin Rice on drums, and Trevor Rogers on vocals and guitar.

== History ==
All of the band's original members were previously members of The Paperboys, reforming as The Clumsy Lovers in 1993 after the Paperboys' original lineup broke up due to creative differences.

Later many of the original members left, and the band changed its name temporarily to the Six Million Dollar Band. In 2002, the Clumsy Lovers toured Canada and the US with Devon Wells, and have performed in various rock clubs. Fiddler Jode and songwriter Chris Jonat are a former members of the band, as is Andrea Lewis.

The band has officially released seven independent albums and released two others, After the Flood and Smart Kid with the Nettwerk Music Group.

== Discography ==
- The Red Tape (1993)
- Picture This (1998)
- Barnburner (1999)
- Still Clumsy After All These Years (2000)
- Live (2001)
- Under The Covers (2002)
- After The Flood (2004)
- Smart Kid (2005)
- Make Yourself Known (2009)
