= Mountain Meadows (album) =

Studio album by Elliott Brood
- Released: June 24, 2008
- Genre: Alternative country; folk; folk rock
- Length: 47:16
- Label: Six Shooter Records

Elliott Brood chronology
Ambassador (2005)	Mountain Meadows (2008)	Days Into Years (2011)

Mountain Meadows is the title of the second full-length album released by the Canadian alternative country band Elliott Brood, released June 24, 2008 on Six Shooter Records. Its title is a reference to the Mountain Meadows massacre.

The album was shortlisted for the 2009 Polaris Music Prize. Mountain Meadows also received two Juno Award nominations in 2009: "Best Roots/Traditional Album", and "Best CD Artwork".

== Track listing ==
1. "Fingers and Tongues"
2. "T-Bill"
3. "Write it All Down for You"
4. "Without Again"
5. "Garden River"
6. "The Valley Town"
7. "Notes"
8. "Woodward Ave."
9. "31 Years"
10. "The Spring Floods (Interlude)"
11. "Chuckwagon"
12. "The Body"
13. "Miss You Now"
