= Mille Pattes Records =

Mille Pattes Records is a Canadian independent record label formed in Quebec. It distributes the music of two of the best known Trad bands of Quebec: La Bottine Souriante and Les Batinses.

== Noted artists ==
- La Bottine Souriante
- Les Batinses

== See also ==
- Music of Quebec
- List of Quebec record labels
- List of record labels
