= 2007 in Canadian music =

This is a summary of the year 2007 in the Canadian music industry.

== Events ==
- February 3
  - At a Calgary Flames game, young Cree singer Akina Shirt becomes the first person to perform "O Canada" in an Aboriginal language at a major league sporting event.
  - American rock band The White Stripes tour Canada in the summer, booking a number of shows in small markets such as Glace Bay, Whitehorse and Iqaluit with the stated goal of performing in every Canadian province and territory. The band also films the video for their single "You Don't Know What Love Is (You Just Do as You're Told)" in Iqaluit.
- March 30 – Influential Canadian rock band Rheostatics perform a farewell show at Toronto's Massey Hall
- April 1 – Juno Awards of 2007 held
- June 2 – the Canadian Hot 100 was released replacing the Canadian Singles Chart
- June 17 – 2007 MuchMusic Video Awards held
- July 10 – 2007 Polaris Music Prize shortlist announced
- August 3 – Jacksoul singer Haydain Neale is seriously injured in a traffic accident
- September 24 – Patrick Watson's Close to Paradise wins the 2007 Polaris Music Prize

== Albums ==
=== A ===
- The Acorn, Glory Hope Mountain
- Apostle of Hustle, National Anthem of Nowhere
- Arcade Fire, Neon Bible
- Jann Arden, Uncover Me

=== B ===
- Sebastian Bach, Angel Down
- Barenaked Ladies, Barenaked Ladies Are Men
- Bedouin Soundclash, Street Gospels
- Daniel Bélanger, L'Échec du matériel
- Ridley Bent, Buckles and Boots
- The Besnard Lakes, The Besnard Lakes Are the Dark Horse
- Bionic, Black Blood
- The Birthday Massacre, Walking with Strangers
- Blood Meridian, Liquidate Paris!
- Blue Rodeo, Small Miracles
- Isabelle Boulay, De retour à la source
- Boys Night Out, Boys Night Out
- Michael Jerome Browne, Double
- Jim Bryson, Where the Bungalows Roam
- Michael Bublé, Call Me Irresponsible
- Buck 65, Situation
- Basia Bulat, Oh, My Darling

=== C ===
- Paul Cargnello, Brûler le jour
- Caribou, Andorra
- Chromeo, Fancy Footwork
- The Choir Practice, The Choir Practice
- The Cliks, Snakehouse
- Code Pie, The Most Trusted Name In Yous
- Ora Cogan, Tatter
- Jesse Cook, Frontiers
- Cowboy Junkies, At the End of Paths Taken, Trinity Revisited
- Deborah Cox, Destination Moon
- Eliana Cuevas, Vidas
- Cuff the Duke, Sidelines of the City

=== D ===
- The Diableros, The Diableros Aren't Ready for the Country
- Céline Dion, D'Elles
- Céline Dion, Taking Chances
- Do Make Say Think, You, You're a History in Rust
- Julie Doiron, Woke Myself Up
- Dragonette, Galore
- Kevin Drew, Spirit If...
- Marc Dupré, Revenir à toi

=== E ===
- Coral Egan, Magnify
- André Ethier, On Blue Fog

=== F ===
- Feist, The Reminder
- Christine Fellows, Nevertheless
- Finger Eleven, Them vs. You vs. Me

=== G ===
- Gob, Muertos Vivos
- Grand Analog, Calligraffiti
- Great Bloomers, Great Bloomers
- Great Lake Swimmers, Ongiara

=== H ===
- Emily Haines & the Soft Skeleton, What Is Free to a Good Home?
- Handsome Furs, Plague Park
- Hedley, Famous Last Words
- Holy Fuck, LP
- Hot Hot Heat, Happiness Ltd.
- Hot Little Rocket, How to Lose Everything
- Hunter Valentine, The Impatient Romantic

=== I ===
- Immaculate Machine, Immaculate Machine's Fables

=== J ===
- Lyndon John X, Two Chord Skankin'
- The Junction, The Junction
- Junior Boys, The Dead Horse EP

=== K ===
- Kaïn, Les saisons s'tassent

=== L ===
- Avril Lavigne, The Best Damn Thing
- Lightning Dust, Lightning Dust
- Lola Dutronic, Lola Dutronic Album 2 - The Love Parade
- Corb Lund, Horse Soldier! Horse Soldier!

=== M ===
- Mahjor Bidet, La vie qui fitte avec la tapisserie
- Raine Maida, The Hunters Lullaby
- John Mann, December Looms
- Marie-Mai, Dangereuse Attraction
- Marilou, Marilou
- Holly McNarland, Chin-Up Buttercup
- Metric, Grow Up and Blow Away
- Joni Mitchell, Shine
- Kim Mitchell, Ain't Life Amazing
- Miracle Fortress, Five Roses
- Katie Moore, Only Thing Worse
- The Most Serene Republic, Population

=== N ===
- Neverending White Lights, Act 2: The Blood and the Life Eternal
- The New Pornographers, Challengers
- A Northern Chorus, The Millions Too Many

=== O ===
- The OBGMs, Intercourse
- Oh Susanna, Short Stories

=== P ===
- The Paperbacks, An Illusion Against Death
- Sandro Perri, Tiny Mirrors
- The Phonemes, There's Something We've Been Meaning to Do
- The Joel Plaskett Emergency, Ashtray Rock

=== R ===
- Raising the Fawn, Sleight of Hand
- Amanda Rheaume, If You Never Live
- Rick White Album, Memoreaper
- Andrew Rodriguez, Here Comes the Light
- Rush, Snakes & Arrows

=== S ===
- The Sadies, New Seasons
- Shad, The Old Prince
- Shapes and Sizes, Split Lips, Winning Hips, A Shiner
- Silverstein, Arrivals & Departures
- Nathalie Simard, Il y avait un jardin
- Tara Slone, Just Look Pretty and Sing
- Small Sins, Mood Swings
- Social Code, Social-Code
- Spiral Beach, Ball
- Stars, In Our Bedroom After the War
- Sum 41, Underclass Hero
- Sunset Rubdown, Random Spirit Lover
- Skye Sweetnam, Sound Soldier

=== T ===
- Tegan and Sara, The Con
- They Shoot Horses, Don't They?, Pick Up Sticks
- Marie-Élaine Thibert, Comme ça
- Thousand Foot Krutch, The Flame in All of Us
- Devin Townsend, Ziltoid the Omniscient
- Two Hours Traffic, Little Jabs

=== V ===
- Various Artists, 93 tours
- Various Artists, Friends in Bellwoods
- Various Artists, The Secret Sessions (Rheostatics tribute album)
- Various Artists, Songs From Instant Star Three

=== W ===
- Rufus Wainwright, Release the Stars
- Wax Mannequin, Orchard and Ire
- The Weakerthans, Reunion Tour
- Wintersleep, Welcome to the Night Sky
- Royal Wood, A Good Enough Day
- Wooden Stars, People Are Different
- Donovan Woods, The Hold Up

=== Y ===
- You Say Party! We Say Die!, Lose All Time
- Neil Young, Chrome Dreams II
- Neil Young, Live at Massey Hall 1971

== Top hits on record ==
=== Top 10 albums ===
Rank	Artist	Album	Peak position	Sales	Certification
1	Celine Dion	Taking Chances	1	400,000	4× Platinum
2	Michael Bublé	Call Me Irresponsible	1	400,000	4× Platinum
3	Anne Murray	Anne Murray Duets: Friends and Legends	2	200,000	2× Platinum
4	Avril Lavigne	The Best Damn Thing	1	200,000	2× Platinum
5	Celine Dion	D'elles	1	200,000	2× Platinum
6	Feist	The Reminder	2	200,000	2× Platinum
7	Kalan Porter	Wake Up Living	4	200,000	2× Platinum
8	Three Days Grace	One-X	2	200,000	2× Platinum
9	Arcade Fire	Neon Bible	1	100,000	Platinum
10	Hedley	Famous Last Words	3	100,000	Platinum

=== Top 10 American albums ===
Rank	Artist	Album	Peak position	Sales	Certification
1	Josh Groban	Noël	1	420,000	6× Platinum
2	Bon Jovi	Lost Highway	1	300,000	3× Platinum
3	Alicia Keys	As I Am	2	200,000	2× Platinum
4	Kanye West	Graduation	1	200,000	2× Platinum
5	Kid Rock	Rock N Roll Jesus	4	200,000	2× Platinum
6	Norah Jones	Not Too Late	1	200,000	2× Platinum
7	Britney Spears	Blackout	1	100,000	Platinum
8	Kelly Clarkson	My December	2	100,000	Platinum
9	Sean Kingston	Sean Kingston	n/a	100,000	Platinum
10	Timbaland	Shock Value	2	100,000	Platinum

=== Top 2 International Albums ===
Rank	Artist	Album	Peak position	Sales	Certification
1	Rihanna	Good Girl Gone Bad	1	500,000	5× Platinum
2	Seether	Finding Beauty in Negative Spaces	10	40,000	Gold

== Deaths ==
- January 19: Denny Doherty, a singer with the 1960s pop group, The Mamas and Papas
- February 17: Dermot O'Reilly, singer and member of the group Ryan's Fancy
- June 15: Richard Bell, musician
- September 25: Patrick Bourque, former bassist from country group Emerson Drive

Preceded by 2006 in Canadian music	Canadian music 2007	Succeeded by 2008 in Canadian music
