= Virgin Festival =

Rock festival

Virgin Mobile Fest
- Virgin Mobile Fest logo
- Genre: Rock
- Locations: United States, Canada
- Years active: 2006 - 2013
- Website: virginfestival.ca

The Virgin Fest, known as the Virgin Mobile FreeFest in the United States, was a rock festival held in the United States and Canada, a spin-off from the V Festival held in the UK. In North America the Virgin name, and more recently the Virgin Mobile USA brand, were used in full to increase brand association, compared with the UK and Australian festivals, where association is simply implied through the use of the letter V.

Like the other variants of the V Festival, the events were sponsored by Virgin Mobile, in this case, either the U.S. or Canadian versions.

On June 30, 2006, Virgin Group chief Richard Branson announced the inaugural shows. The first, which took place in 2006 on September 9 and 10 at Toronto Islands Park in Toronto, Ontario, Canada, featured over 40 artists. A single-day show also took place in Baltimore, Maryland, in the United States, on September 23, 2006, at the Pimlico Race Course with the Red Hot Chili Peppers and The Who.

Virgin Festival 2007 took place in Vancouver on May 20 and 21, as well as a return to Pimlico Race Course in Baltimore for an expanded two-day event on August 4 and 5 and Toronto on September 8 and 9. On October 16, 2007, an event was announced to take place in Calgary, Alberta, on June 21 and 22, 2008. The festival also returned to Baltimore on August 9 and 10, 2008.

The shows in Baltimore were put on by Seth Hurwitz's I.M.P. Productions, owner and operator of the 9:30 Club in Washington, D.C., and the former producer of the HFStival.

In 2007, Richard Branson was encouraged by Daryl Hannah to green the Baltimore festival by bringing in zero waste event producers The Spitfire Agency.

The 2009 Virgin Mobile Festival, dubbed the Virgin Mobile FreeFest, was held on August 30, 2009 at the Merriweather Post Pavilion in Columbia, Maryland. The festival returned to Merriweather on Saturday, September 25, 2010, and was once again a free event. The Virgin Mobile FreeFest also returned to Merriweather Post Pavilion on September 10, 2011. The tickets were reported to have "freed out" in just over five minutes after being available. The headliners for the 2011 Virgin Mobile FreeFest were Deadmau5 (house), Cee Lo Green (hip-hop/pop), and the Black Keys (indie).

== 2013 lineup ==
=== Virgin Mobile FreeFest (Saturday, September 21st) ===
Pavilion Stage

- The Knocks
- Little Green Cars
- Black Joe Lewis
- City and Colour
- MGMT
- The Avett Brothers
- Vampire Weekend

West Stage

- Sky Ferreira
- Chvrches
- Icona Pop
- Kaskade
- Robin Thicke
- Pretty Lights

Dance Forest

- Ghost Beach
- Washed Out
- Manufactured Superstars
- Congorock
- TJR
- Gareth Emery
- Madeon

== 2012 lineup ==
=== Virgin Mobile FreeFest (Saturday, October 6th) ===
Pavilion Stage

- Justin Jones
- Allen Stone
- Trampled by Turtles
- Ben Folds Five
- Alabama Shakes
- ZZ Top
- Jack White

West Stage

- Das Racist (cancelled due to illness/breakup)
- Future Islands
- Portugal. The Man
- The Dismemberment Plan
- Santigold
- Nas
- M83
- Skrillex

Dance Forest

- Volta Bureau
- Penguin Prison
- Alvin Risk
- Nervo
- Thomas Gold
- Porter Robinson & Zedd
- Above & Beyond

== 2011 lineup ==
=== Virgin Mobile FreeFest (Saturday, September 10th) ===
Pavilion Stage

- Bombay Bicycle Club
- Okkervil River
- Grace Potter & the Nocturnals
- Patti Smith
- TV on the Radio returning for a second time (2007)
- The Black Keys returning for a second time (2008)

West Stage

- Alberta Cross
- Two Door Cinema Club
- Big Sean
- Cut Copy
- Cee Lo Green returning for a second time (2006 as Gnarls Barkley)
- Empire of the Sun
- Deadmau5 returning for a second time (2008)

Dance Forest

- Eclectic Method
- Porter Robinson
- Calvin Harris
- !!!
- James Murphy returning for a second time (2010 as LCD Soundsystem)
- Teddybears
- Ghostland Observatory

== 2010 lineup ==
=== Virgin Mobile FreeFest (September 25th) ===
The Virgin Mobile Freefest line-up was announced at 11AM on July 20, 2010.

Pavilion Stage

- Brite Lite Brite
- Jimmy Eat World
- Edward Sharpe and the Magnetic Zeros
- High tea toast with Jeremiah Weed
- Joan Jett and the Blackhearts
- Matt and Kim
- Pavement
- LCD Soundsystem

West Stage

- The Temper Trap
- Trombone Shorty
- Yeasayer
- Thievery Corporation
- Ludacris
- Bindlestiff Family Cirkus
- M.I.A.
- Fire show by Therm

Dance Forest

- Will Eastman
- Wolfgang Gartner
- Neon Indian
- Maximum Balloon
- Chromeo
- Sleigh Bells
- Modeselektor
- Sharam

Artist T.I. canceled his performance due to ongoing legal issues.

== 2009 lineup ==
=== Virgin Mobile FreeFest (August 30th) ===
The Virgin Mobile FreeFest was held at the Merriweather Post Pavilion in Columbia, Maryland. In an official statement released by Virgin Mobile, it was stated that due to the current economic conditions, admission to the festival would be free of charge for all concertgoers. The sponsor hoped that concertgoers would donate $5 to youth homelessness through its charitable initiative known as the RE*Generation. Concertgoers could also purchase special packages that came with a T-shirt, as well as tickets and the donation.

Sunday, August 30

- Blink-182
- Weezer
- Taking Back Sunday
- Jet
- Franz Ferdinand
- Mates of State
- The Hold Steady
- Wale
- Public Enemy
- The Bravery
- St. Vincent
- Girl Talk
- The National
- Danny Howells
- Holy Fuck
- Lee Burridge
- Pete Tong
- The Birthday Massacre

=== Virgin Festival Montreal (June 19 & 20) ===
Friday, June 19

- The Black Eyed Peas
- Simple Plan
- Hedley
- Kreesha Turner
- The New Cities
- Carly Rae Jepsen
- Eva Avila
- Stereos
- Ten Second Epic
- Sam Bradley

Saturday, June 20

- New Kids on the Block
- Akon
- David Usher
- Live
- Karl Wolf
- Jesse McCartney
- Lights
- Divine Brown
- Jonathan Roy
- JabbaWockeeZ
- 2AM Club

=== Virgin Festival Nova Scotia (July 4) ===
The venue was the Citadel Hill concert site, adjacent to the Halifax Common.

Saturday, July 4

- The Offspring
- Metric
- Handsome Furs
- Dinosaur Jr
- Hey Rosetta!
- Plants and Animals
- Arkells
- In-Flight Safety
- Dog Day

Tragically Hip cancelled due to family medical issues.

=== Virgin Festival British Columbia (July 25 & July 26) ===
Saturday, July 25

- The Roots
- Our Lady Peace
- Broken Social Scene
- K-OS
- Mutemath
- Spinnerette
- Plants and Animals
- Chris Velan

Sunday, July 26

- Ben Harper & Relentless7
- Metric
- Sonic Youth
- Jarvis Cocker
- De La Soul
- Gomez
- Future of the Left
- Awesome Color
- Carly Rae Jepsen
- Edward Sharpe and the Magnetic Zeros

=== Virgin Festival Alberta (August 8th & 9th) ===
Saturday, August 8

- Pearl Jam
- Wintersleep
- K-OS
- Thunderheist
- Arkells
- Mother Mother
- The Cliks

Sunday, August 9

- Billy Talent
- Metric
- Tokyo Police Club
- White Lies
- Secret Broadcast
- Shout Out Out Out Out

=== Virgin Festival Ontario (August 29th & 30th) ===
Saturday, August 29

Virgin Mobile Stage

- Ben Harper & Relentless7
- The Pixies
- Franz Ferdinand
- Paolo Nutini
- Sloan
- Grizzly Bear
- Lights
- Mates of State

Virgin Radio Stage

- Daniel Merriweather
- Pitbull
- Down With Webster
- Thunderheist
- Anjulie
- Candy Coated Killahz

Boardwalk Stage

- The Rural Alberta Advantage
- Iglu and Hartly
- The Superstitions

Sunday, August 30

Virgin Mobile Stage

- Nine Inch Nails
- Pet Shop Boys
- Our Lady Peace
- N.E.R.D.
- Cold War Kids
- Mutemath
- Mew
- Datarock
- Cœur de pirate

Virgin Radio Stage

- Sean Kingston
- The New Cities
- Melanie Fiona
- Hyper Crush
- Fritz Helder & The Phantoms
- Trouble Andrew

Boardwalk Stage

- Plants and Animals
- The Von Bondies
- The D'Urbervilles
- Silver Starling

== 2008 line-up ==
=== Virgin Festival Calgary (June 21 & 22) ===
Saturday, June 21

Virgin Mobile Stage

- Kilbourne (band)
- The Fratellis
- Face to Face
- Corb Lund
- Three Days Grace
- The Flaming Lips
- Stone Temple Pilots

TD Music Stage

- The Fast Romantics
- Michael Bernard Fitzgerald
- Secret Broadcast
- Carolina Liar
- Crash Parallel
- Hey Ocean
- The Dudes
- Grand Theft Bus

Sunday, June 22

Virgin Mobile Stage

- Chixdiggit
- Attack in Black
- Constantines
- Stars
- City and Colour
- Matthew Good
- The Tragically Hip

TD Music Stage

- The Summerlad
- Said The Whale
- The Whitsundays (band)
- The Spades
- Ten Second Epic
- Ladyhawk
- Cadence Weapon
- The New Pornographers

=== Virgin Mobile Festival Baltimore Day 1 (August 9) ===
South Stage

- KT Tunstall
- Gogol Bordello
- Lupe Fiasco
- Bloc Party
- The Offspring
- Chuck Berry and the Silver Beats
- Foo Fighters

North Stage

- Cat Power
- Duffy
- The Swell Season
- Sharon Jones & the Dap Kings
- Rodrigo y Gabriela
- Citizen Cope
- Wilco
- Jack Johnson

Dance Tent'

- JDH & Dave P
- Erol Alkan
- DJ Dan & Donald Glaude
- Soulwax
- Steve Lawler
- Ferry Corsten
- Underworld

=== Virgin Mobile Festival Baltimore Day 2 (August 10) ===
South Stage

- Hollywood Undead
- The Go! Team
- Andrew Bird
- She & Him
- Lil Wayne
- The Black Keys
- Bob Dylan
- Kanye West

North Stage

- Black Rebel Motorcycle Club
- Shudder to Think
- Paramore
- Taking Back Sunday
- Iggy and the Stooges
- Stone Temple Pilots
- Nine Inch Nails

Dance Tent

- Chromeo
- Rabbit in the Moon
- Deadmau5
- Richie Hawtin
- Moby (DJ set)
- Armin Van Buuren

=== Virgin Festival Toronto Day 1 (September 6) ===
Virgin Mobile Stage

- Foo Fighters
- Bloc Party
- Against Me!
- MGMT
- Constantines
- Tito Santana
- The Airborne Toxic Event
- Mark Robertson

TD Music Stage

- The Kooks
- Wintersleep
- The Fratellis
- Spiritualized
- Shudder to Think
- The Midway State
- Mardeen

Oh Henry! Stage

- The Waking Eyes
- Bad Flirt
- Lights
- Flash Lightnin
- The Saint Aliva Cartel
- We Are the Take

Bacardi B-Live Stage

- MSTRKRFT (special, un-announced guest)
- Flosstradamus
- Thunderheist
- Lets Go to War
- Drop the Lime
- Mario J
- Nasty Nav

Switch and SebastiAn were replaced by MSTRKRFT due to delayed flights.

=== Virgin Festival Toronto Day 2 (September 7) ===
Virgin Mobile Stage

- Oasis
- Paul Weller
- Stereophonics
- Silversun Pickups
- The Weakerthans
- Danko Jones
- Spiral Beach

TD Music Stage

- The Pigeon Detectives
- Sons and Daughters
- Yoav
- Matt Costa
- Sebastien Grainger and The Mountains
- Paper Lions

Oh Henry! Stage

- Secret Broadcast (band)
- Shad
- Rock Plaza Central
- Arkells
- OPOPO
- Winter Gloves

Bacardi B-Live Stage

- Moby (DJ set)
- Deadmau5
- Lee Burridge
- Sydney Blu
- Doman and Pettigrew
- Evan G
- Harmonik Rage

== 2007 line-up ==
=== Virgin Festival (Vancouver) Day 1 ===
- My Chemical Romance
- Billy Talent
- Rise Against (replaced Muse on the bill)
- Mutemath
- Stars of Track and Field
- Jets Overhead
- Enter Shikari
- Pride Tiger
- The Junction
- TV Heart Attack (band)
- The Bled
- Hernan Cattaneo
- Kevin Shiu
- Andrew Pacey
- Jesse James
- Veer (band)
- The Look
- Neurosonic
- Crowned Kings

=== Virgin Festival (Vancouver) Day 2 ===
- The Killers
- AFI
- Art Of Dying
- Hot Hot Heat
- Metric
- Smoosh
- You Say Party! We Say Die!
- Marianas Trench
- Mother Mother
- illScarlett
- Sebastien Grainger et les Montagnes
- The Reason
- MSTRKRFT
- Tommie Sunshine
- Desyn Masiello
- John Morgan
- Timeline
- [yson V
- Elizabeth
- Superbeing
- Yuca (band）

=== Virgin Festival (Baltimore) Day 1 ===
North (Main) Stage

- Fountains of Wayne
- Cheap Trick
- Amy Winehouse
- Incubus
- Ben Harper and the Innocent Criminals
- Beastie Boys
- The Police

South (Side) Stage

- Fiction Plane
- The Fratellis
- Paulo Nutini
- Peter Bjorn and John
- LCD Soundsystem
- TV on the Radio
- Modest Mouse

Dance Tent

- Shout Out Out Out Out
- Miguel Migs
- Booka Shade
- Felix Da Housecat
- Danny Tenaglia
- Sasha & John Digweed
- Sander Van Doorn

=== Virgin Festival (Baltimore) Day 2 ===
North (Main) Stage

- CSS
- Regina Spektor
- Spoon
- Panic! at the Disco
- Yeah Yeah Yeahs
- Interpol
- The Smashing Pumpkins

South (Side) Stage

- Aiden
- Matisyahu
- Explosions in the Sky
- Bad Brains
- Wu-Tang Clan
- Velvet Revolver
- 311

Dance Tent

- Dan Deacon
- Girl Talk
- Dieselboy and Andy C
- James Zabiela
- Infected Mushroom
- The Crystal Method (DJ Set), Deep Dish
- M.I.A.

=== Virgin Festival (Toronto) Day 1 ===
Virgin Mobile Stage

- Björk
- Interpol
- Arctic Monkeys
- Kid Koala
- M.I.A.
- K-OS
- Paolo Nutini
- The Vincent Black Shadow

Future Shop Stage

- Mutemath
- Voxtrot
- Matt Costa
- Enter Shikari
- The Most Serene Republic
- The Wildbirds
- Dragonette
- Jon Levine Band

Budweiser Stage

- Spectrum, feat. Sonic Boom,
  Spacemen 3 & E.A.R
- Hayley Sales
- The Reason
- Sybris
- Birds of Wales
- Clothes Make the Man (band)
- Bang Camaro
- Crowned King
- Noah's Arkweld

B-Live Stage

- Souljazz Orchestra
- DJ Dopey
- Tommie Sunshine
- Princess Superstar
- Kevin Shiu
- Robbi K
- Eric McCabe
- Tony Pantages

=== Virgin Festival (Toronto) Day 2 ===
Virgin Mobile Stage

- Smashing Pumpkins
- The Killers
- Metric
- Stars
- Tokyo Police Club
- Jamie T
- Louis XIV
- Earl Greyhound

Future Shop Stage

- Editors
- Explosions in the Sky
- Constantines
- Blonde Redhead
- The Clientele
- Biffy Clyro
- Honeycut
- Justin Nozuka

Budweiser Stage

- The Cinematics
- The Heights
- The Red Romance
- The Carps
- Museum Pieces
- Closedown (band)
- DD/MM/YYYY
- The Postage Stamps (band)

B-Live Stage

- Jelo
- Dirty Vegas
- M.A.N.D.Y.
- Tony Pantages
- Steve Porter
- Sean Miller (DJ)
- Souljazz Orchestra
- Evan G

== 2006 line-up ==
=== Virgin Festival (Toronto) Day 1 ===
- The Flaming Lips
- Gnarls Barkley
- Muse
- Alexisonfire
- Eagles of Death Metal
- The Dears
- The Hidden Cameras
- Starsailor
- Phoenix
- Amon Tobin
- Buck 65
- Plaster
- David Ford
- Wintersleep
- Kid Koala
- Ohbijou
- Mean Red Spiders
- illScarlett

=== Virgin Festival (Toronto) Day 2 ===
- Broken Social Scene replaced Massive Attack
- The Raconteurs
- The Strokes
- Sam Roberts Band
- Wolfmother
- Lupe Fiasco
- Thrice
- Zero 7
- K'Naan
- Matt Mays & El Torpedo
- The Diableros
- José González
- We Are Wolves
- Mickey Avalon
- MSTRKRFT
- The Mooney Suzuki
- Born Ruffians
- Champion & His G-Strings

Massive Attack were originally scheduled to headline but three days before the concert, it was announced that they had to postpone the first four concerts of their North American tour, including the Virgin Festival appearance, due to delays in receiving U.S. visas. They were replaced by Broken Social Scene.

=== Virgin Festival (Baltimore) ===
- Red Hot Chili Peppers
- The Who
- The Flaming Lips
- Gnarls Barkley
- The Raconteurs
- Keane (cancelled)
- The Killers
- Scissor Sisters
- Wolfmother
- Kasabian
- The New Pornographers
- Drive-By Truckers
- Thievery Corporation
- Brazilian Girls
- Clap Your Hands Say Yeah
- Digweed
- Carl Cox
- RJD2
- 2 Many DJs
- Tiësto (cancelled)
- James Holden

== See also ==
- Olympic Island Festival
