= JCT =

JCT may refer to:

== Businesses and organisations ==
- Jerusalem College of Technology, Israel
- Joint Collaborative Team on Video Coding
- Joint Committee on Taxation, of the United States Congress
- Joint Contracts Tribunal, in the United Kingdom
- J. C. Tenorio Enterprises, a Marianan conglomerate

== Science ==
- Juxtaglomerular cell tumor, in renal medicine
- Jordan curve theorem, in mathematics

== Other uses ==
- JCT FC, an Indian association club (1971–2011)
- Krymchak language, spoken in Crimea

== See also ==
- Junction (disambiguation)
