= The Junction (disambiguation) =

The Junction may refer to:

== Places ==
- The Junction, a neighbourhood in Toronto, Ontario, Canada
- The Junction, New South Wales, a suburb of Newcastle, New South Wales, Australia
- The Junction (Vancouver), a gay bar and nightclub in Vancouver, British Columbia, Canada
- The Junction, former name of Vaughan, Victoria, Australia
- The intersection of Flatbush and Nostrand Avenues in Brooklyn, New York City, U.S., locally called "The Junction"
- The northern concurrency terminus of I-94 and I-90 in Chicago, Illinois, U.S., locally called "The Junction"
- Limerick Junction railway station, Ireland, locally called "The Junction"

== Music and media ==
- The Junction (band), a rock band from Brampton, Ontario, Canada
  - The Junction (The Junction album), their self-titled album
- The Junction (The Manhattan Transfer album), a 2018 album by jazz vocal group The Manhattan Transfer
- "The Junction" (The Twilight Zone), an episode of The New Twilight Zone

== See also ==
- Junction (disambiguation)
- The Junction Boys (film), a 2002 American made-for-television sports drama film
- Up the Junction (song), a 1979 single by Squeeze
- Up the Junction (soundtrack), a 1968 studio album by Manfred Mann
- Up the Junction (The Wednesday Play), a 1965 episode of the BBC anthology drama series The Wednesday Play
