= Junction =

Junction may refer to:

== Arts and entertainment ==
- Junction (2012 film), an American film
- Junction (2024 film), an American film
- Jjunction, a 2002 Indian film
- Junction (album), a 1976 album by Andrew Cyrille
- Junction (EP), by Basement Jaxx, 2002
- Junction (manga), or Hot Tails
- Junction (video game), 1990
- Junction Theatre Company, in South Australia (1984–2002)
- Junction system, a feature of the video game Final Fantasy VIII

== Science and technology ==
- Cell junction, a class of cellular structures in biology
- Electrical junction, a point or area where multiple conductors or semiconductors make physical contact
- Junction (hackathon), an event in Helsinki, Finland
- Junctions, a construct of Raku (programming language)
- Neuromuscular junction, junction between motor neuron and muscle fiber

== Transport ==
- Junction (traffic), a location where traffic can change between different routes
  - Road junction
  - Junction (rail)
  - Junction (canal)
- Junctions (software), a traffic simulation software package

== Places in the United States ==
- Junction, California, now Roseville
- Junction, Idaho
- Junction, Illinois
- Junction, Ohio
- Junction, Texas
- Junction, Utah
- Junction, West Virginia
- Junction, Wisconsin

== Other uses ==
- Junction (investment platform), an online investment tool
- Junction and nexus, a pair of syntactic (and semantic) kinds of relation

== See also ==
- The Junction (disambiguation)
- Junction City (disambiguation)
- Junction station (disambiguation)
- Junction transistor (disambiguation)
- Grand Junction (disambiguation)
- Junction box, an enclosure housing electrical connections
