= Baudelaire (disambiguation) =

Baudelaire most commonly refers to Charles Baudelaire (1821–1867), French poet.

Baudelaire may also refer to:

- Baudelaire (surname)
- Baudelaire, a 1947 book-length essay on Charles Baudelaire by Jean-Paul Sartre
- Baudelaires, a fictional family in A Series of Unfortunate Events
- The Baudelaire Fractal, a 2020 novel by Lisa Robertson
- The Baudelaire Label, Canadian record label
- "Baudelaire", a song from the 2002 album Source Tags & Codes by ...And You Will Know Us by the Trail of Dead
- "Baudelaire", a song from the 2017 album Snow by Angus & Julia Stone
- An alternative spelling of Baselard, a type of late medieval dagger or knife

== See also ==
- Sir Baudelaire
