= Recovery Child =

Canadian alternative rock band

- Origin: Toronto, Ontario, Canada
- Genres: Alternative rock
- Years active: 2006–2013
- Members: Gord Davidson; Ryan McCambridge; Greg McEvoy; Ben Tran
- Past members: Logan Scott; Dave Palmer
- Website: Official website

Recovery Child is a four-piece alternative rock band from Toronto, Ontario.

Formed in early 2006, the band frequently played in southern Ontario before releasing their independent EP On Being And The Affect later that year. Produced by Brian Moncarz (Moneen, Pilot Speed, Circa Survive), and mastered by acclaimed mastering engineer Greg Calbi at Sterling Sound, the EP gained Recovery Child notoriety due to its success on US and Canadian CMJ college radio. This gave the band the opportunity to compete for 97.7 HTZ-FM's acclaimed Rocksearch contest, with past winners like Finger Eleven and The Trews. The band ended up winning the Rocksearch contest, which got their first single "Trigger Me" into rotation on 97.7 HTZ-FM and other Astral Media radio stations, as well as 102.1 The Edge.

Recovery Child continued to support the record with regional tours while playing festivals like North By Northeast, and notable shows for the Canadian Armed Forces. The band was also featured on CIRAA's audio documentary The New Indie, a guide to the Canadian music industry which also featured singer/songwriter Ron Sexsmith and CBC personality Jian Ghomeshi.

The band went on to dedicate time to writing and recording their follow up album to On Being And The Affect. In the summer of 2010, during the recording, Recovery Child's lead singer Ryan McCambridge organized Spill: Songs For Oil Spill Relief, a music compilation to raise money for Oceana and the Gulf of Mexico oil spill. The compilation featured a number of other Canadian artists such as Dragonette, The Junction, Dinosaur Bones, Lindi Ortega, Spirits, among others. Toro magazine featured an article praising the compilation.

The band has since set out to play shows across North America, gaining coverage by regarded magazines like Truth Explosion. In 2011, the band released Afterimage.

== Band members ==
- Gord Davidson – drums
- Ryan McCambridge – vocals, guitar
- Greg McEvoy – guitar
- Ben Tran – bass

== Discography ==
Release year	Title	Label
2006	Recovery Child	Independent
2006/2007	On Being And The Affect	Independent
2011	Afterimage	Independent
