= The Dying Arts =

Canadian rock band

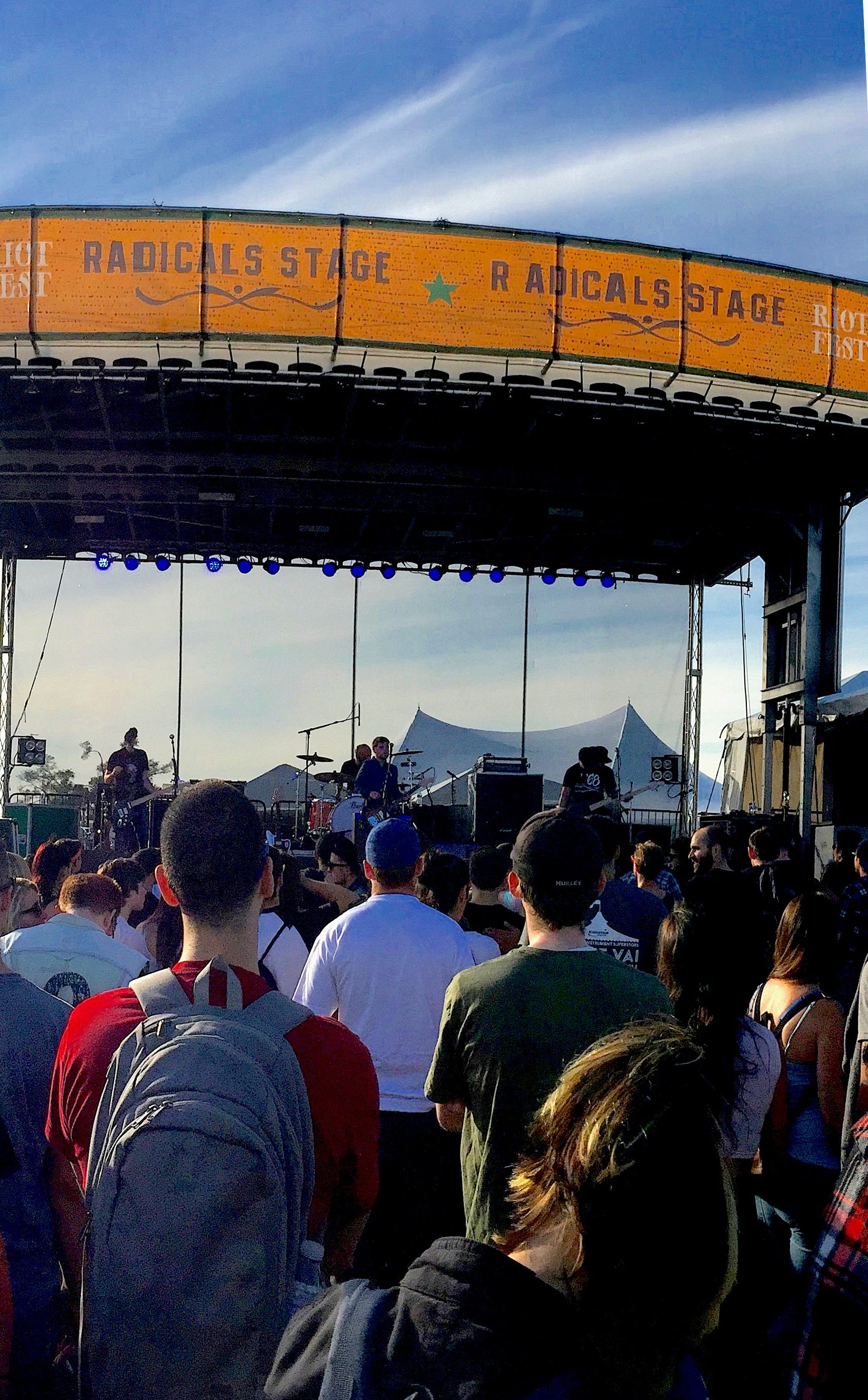
- The Dying Arts at Riot Fest Sept 2015.

Background information
- Origin: Toronto, Ontario, Canada
- Genres: Indie Rock; Post Punk; Alternative Rock
- Years active: 2011–present
- Labels: Culvert Music, Universal Music (Canada), Caroline (World)
- Members: Mike Portoghese; Joe Torchia; Daniel Scuglia; Simon Poole
- Website: thedyingarts.com

The Dying Arts are a Canadian rock band from Toronto, Canada consisting of guitarist/vocalist Mike Portoghese, bassist Simon Poole, drummer Joe Torchia, and guitarist Daniel Scuglia.

== Self-Titled EP (2014) ==
On June 3, 2014 VICE Magazine premiered their debut self-titled EP produced by Jon Drew (Arkells, Tokyo Police Club, Metz), of which they described the band as "…the fury of Fugazi and early Nirvana meets the somber ambient soundscapes of later Radiohead." They held a record release show at the Horseshoe Tavern on June 7, with fellow Toronto band Uncut as the opener.

Following the buzz from their EP they signed with United Talent Agency (The Agency Group), and began touring North America. The songs, Bed Spins and Snake in the Grass received significant national radio play for which the band was nominated for Best Emerging Artist at the SiriusXM Awards.

The Torontoist published a review stating: "some great moments happen here in the transitions between violence and contemplativeness. In every track, force gives way to gentler, more atmospheric passages that privilege tenderness and texture above sheer power, and the movement between these modes is done exceedingly well."

In November 2014 VICE Magazine premiered the video for Bed Spins. Shortly after the release, Canadian magazine, Exclaim! published a review stating "It's a pretty simple video, but conveys that the band can crush it in the flesh." They ended 2014 with a tour of Eastern Canada supporting The Motorleague, followed by a southern Ontario tour with members of Alexisonfire, Billy Talent, Walk the Earth off-shoot, Say Yes. In February 2015, American punk band Anti-Flag took them on tour as main support for the Canadian-wing of their tour.

== You Had it Coming (2015) ==
In June 2015 the band signed to Canadian record label, Culvert Music (Hot Hot Heat, The Junction, Saukrates, Diana) and announced their second album You Had it Coming. which was recorded live off the floor in 3 days by producer, Michael Norberg and mixed by Grammy Award-winning mixer, Dave Schiffman (Rage Against the Machine, Weezer, Red Hot Chilli Peppers). The band recorded a batch of songs with the intention of releasing a couple of 7" singles, but after signing to Culvert, decided to release the whole collection as an album.

On October 23, You Had it Coming was released in stores worldwide, and the band supported the album with a 20-stop national tour with The Motorleague.

== Discography ==
=== Studio albums ===
- 2013 – Spring Sampler (Independent)
- 2014 – The Dying Arts S/T (Independent)
- 2015 – You Had it Coming (Culvert Music / Universal Music / Caroline)

=== Singles ===
- Authentic (2013)
- Scratch (2014)
- Bed Spins (2014)
- Liar / Road Rage 7" (2015)

=== Music Videos ===
- Authentic (2013)
- Bed Spins (2014)
- Liar (2015)
