= Lola Dutronic Album 2 – The Love Parade =

Lola Dutronic Album 2 The Love Parade

Studio album by Lola Dutronic
- Released: 2007
- Recorded: Toronto
- Genre: Pop music
- Length: 63:50
- Label: Bongo Beat Records
- Producer: Richard Citroen

Lola Dutronic chronology
The World of Lola Dutronic (2004)	Lola Dutronic Album 2 The Love Parade (2007)	Lola Dutronic in Berlin (2008)

Professional ratings
Review scores
Source	Rating
Allmusic	link

Lola Dutronic Album 2 – The Love Parade, the second album by Canadian electronic music duo Lola Dutronic, was issued in 2007. "La Mer" is an adaptation from the song by Charles Trenet, and "Sukiyaki" is a remix of a song by Kyu Sakamoto. "Le Model" is an adaptation from the song "The Model / Das Modell" by Kraftwerk.

== Track listing ==
#	Title	Credit	Length
1.	"Lolatron"	Citroen	3:51
2.	"It's A Lovely Day"	Citroen	5:33
3.	"Un Histoire de Plage"	Bourgeois / Rivière	3:09
4.	"Le Model"	Hütter / Schneider	4:12
5.	"Chanson d'Edie"	Citroen / Hart	4:57
6.	"La Mer (Beyond The Sea)"	Trenet	3:29
7.	"Last Day Of The Season"	Citroen / Hart	4:42
8.	"Sukiyaki"	Rokusuke	5:13
9.	"Driving in the Rain"	Citroen	3:14
10.	"Beautiful World"	Citroen	4:54
11.	"The World Is Waiting for You"	Citroen	5:27
12.	"Chanson De L'Amour"	Citroen / Hart	3:39
13.	"Here Comes The Winter"	Citroen / Hart	4:49
14.	"Maritza 3000"	Delanoë / Renard	6:14
15.	"The Strawberry Filter"	Citroen	0:27
