= Acoustic Kitty (album) =

Studio album by John Mann
- Released: March 15, 2002
- Genre: folk rock
- Length: 45:40
- Label: Nettwerk
- Producer: Michael Phillip Wojewoda

John Mann chronology
Acoustic Kitty (2002)	December Looms (2007)

Acoustic Kitty is the debut solo album by Canadian singer-songwriter John Mann, the lead singer of Spirit of the West. It was released in 2002 on Nettwerk.

Mann's supporting band for the album consisted of Doug Elliott, Ford Pier and Michael Phillip Wojewoda. Wojewoda also produced the album.

The album's title track is inspired by the CIA's Acoustic Kitty espionage project of the 1960s, in which surveillance microphones were implanted into a cat.

Mann garnered two Western Canadian Music Award nominations for the album, in the categories of Outstanding Songwriter and Entertainer of the Year. At the Juno Awards of 2003, the album garnered a nomination for Album Art of the Year, for designer John Rummen.

== Track listing ==
1. "Somebody's Miracle"
2. "A Lot to Learn"
3. "Acoustic Kitty"
4. "What Language"
5. "Ill Placed Monuments"
6. "Red Deer?"
7. "American TV"
8. "As Berlin Builds"
9. "Come Along With Me Tonight"
10. "Love's a Sobbing Idiot"
11. "Our Sick Love"
12. "Winterton"
