= Hunter Valentine =

Canadian alternative rock band

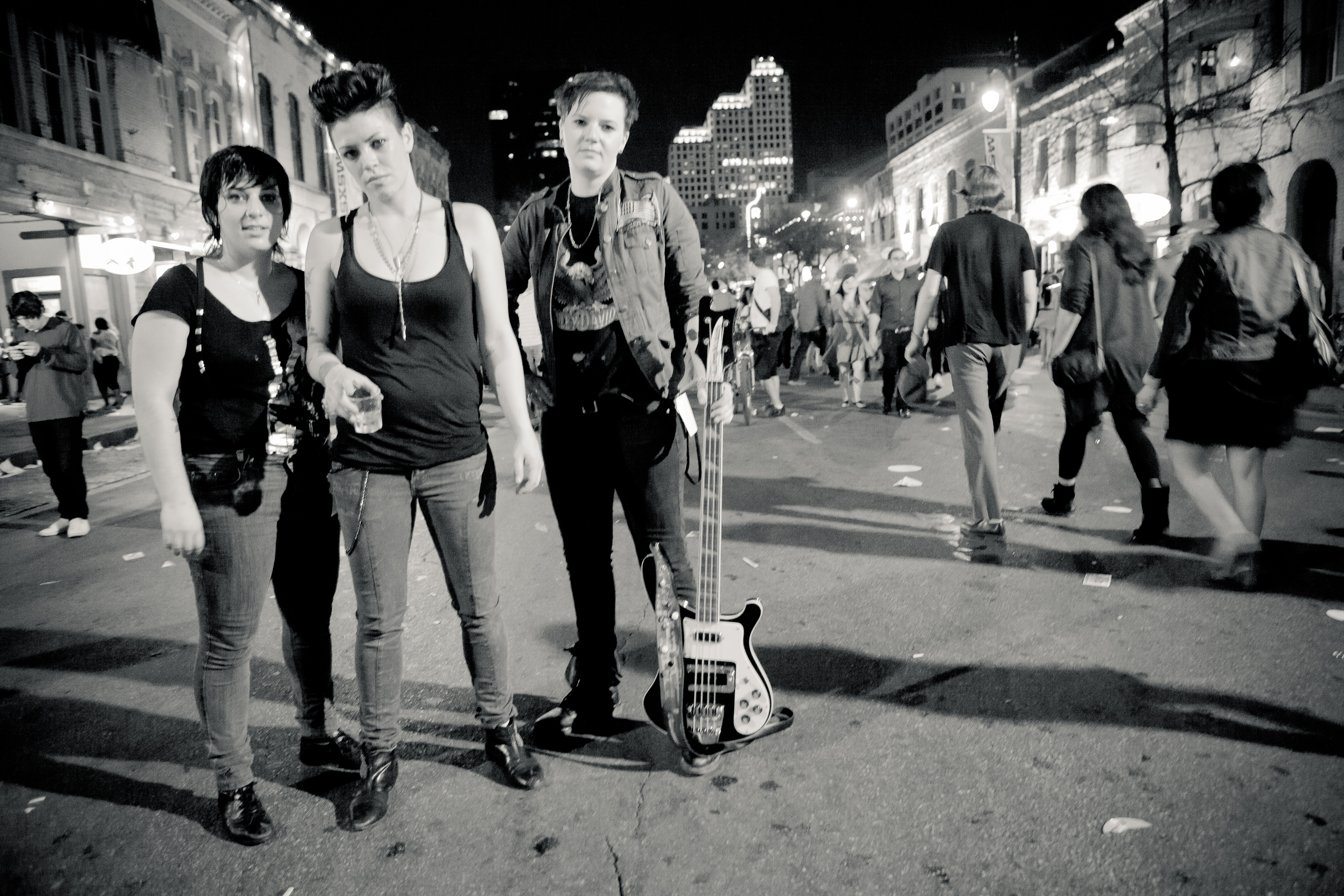
- Hunter Valentine, at the SXSW festival of Austin, Texas in March 2011

Background information
- Origin: Toronto, Ontario, Canada
- Genres: Indie rock Alternative rock Pop rock Indie pop
- Years active: 2004–present
- Labels: True North Records; Tommy Boy; Universal Music
- Members: Kiyomi McCloskey; Laura Petracca; Lisa Bianco; Leanne Bowes
- Past members: Adrienne Lloyd; Somer Bingham; Veronica Sanchez; Aimee Bessada
- Website: www.huntervalentine.com

Hunter Valentine is a Canadian alternative rock band formed in 2004 in Toronto, Ontario.

== History ==
The present lineup of Hunter Valentine consists of Kiyomi McCloskey, Laura Petracca, Leanne Bowes, and Aimee Bessada. Their journey began when they signed a deal with True North Records in the autumn of 2006, marking a significant milestone in their career. Subsequently, they released their inaugural full-length album, The Impatient Romantic, on April 10, 2007.

Notably, Hunter Valentine's connection with music extended to being the resident band at Buck's Rock Performing and Creative Arts Camp in New Milford, Connecticut. Following their departure from True North Records in the fall of 2009, the band took a self-funded route to record a 7-song album, collaborating with Ian Blurton. Their determination led them to make multiple trips to the vibrant music scene of New York City, hoping to capture the attention of labels. Their relentless efforts paid off, as they soon signed a deal with Tommy Boy.

In 2010, their musical journey continued as they unveiled an EP titled Lessons From the Late Night. This captivating release made its debut in Canada on April 17, followed by a worldwide release on May 11 of the same year. Notably, their 2012 tour was documented in Season 3 of the popular television series The Real L Word on Showtime, offering viewers an intimate look at their experiences on the road.

One of the band's pinnacle moments came in 2013 when they had the privilege of serving as the opening act for Cyndi Lauper during the North American leg of her She's So Unusual: 30th Anniversary Tour. Their journey continued to unfold as they joined the lineup of the esteemed traveling rock festival, Vans Warped Tour, in July 2014. Additionally, that same summer, they were featured on VH1's Make or Break: The Linda Perry Project, solidifying their presence in the music industry.

== Members ==
Kiyomi McCloskey is the lead guitarist and vocalist in the band Hunter Valentine. She has cited Neil Young, the Rolling Stones, Robert Johnson, Lucinda Williams, and Janis Joplin as influences. McCloskey was featured on the third season of The Real L Word, a lesbian-based TV show on Showtime.

Laura Petracca is the drummer in Hunter Valentine. She began playing drums at a very young age and competed successfully in many local drum competitions. She was inspired by many classic rock and grunge rock artists.

Leanne Bowes is the bassist for Hunter Valentine, joining in early 2013.

Lisa Bianco plays the guitar and keyboard and joined the band in 2014.

== Past members ==
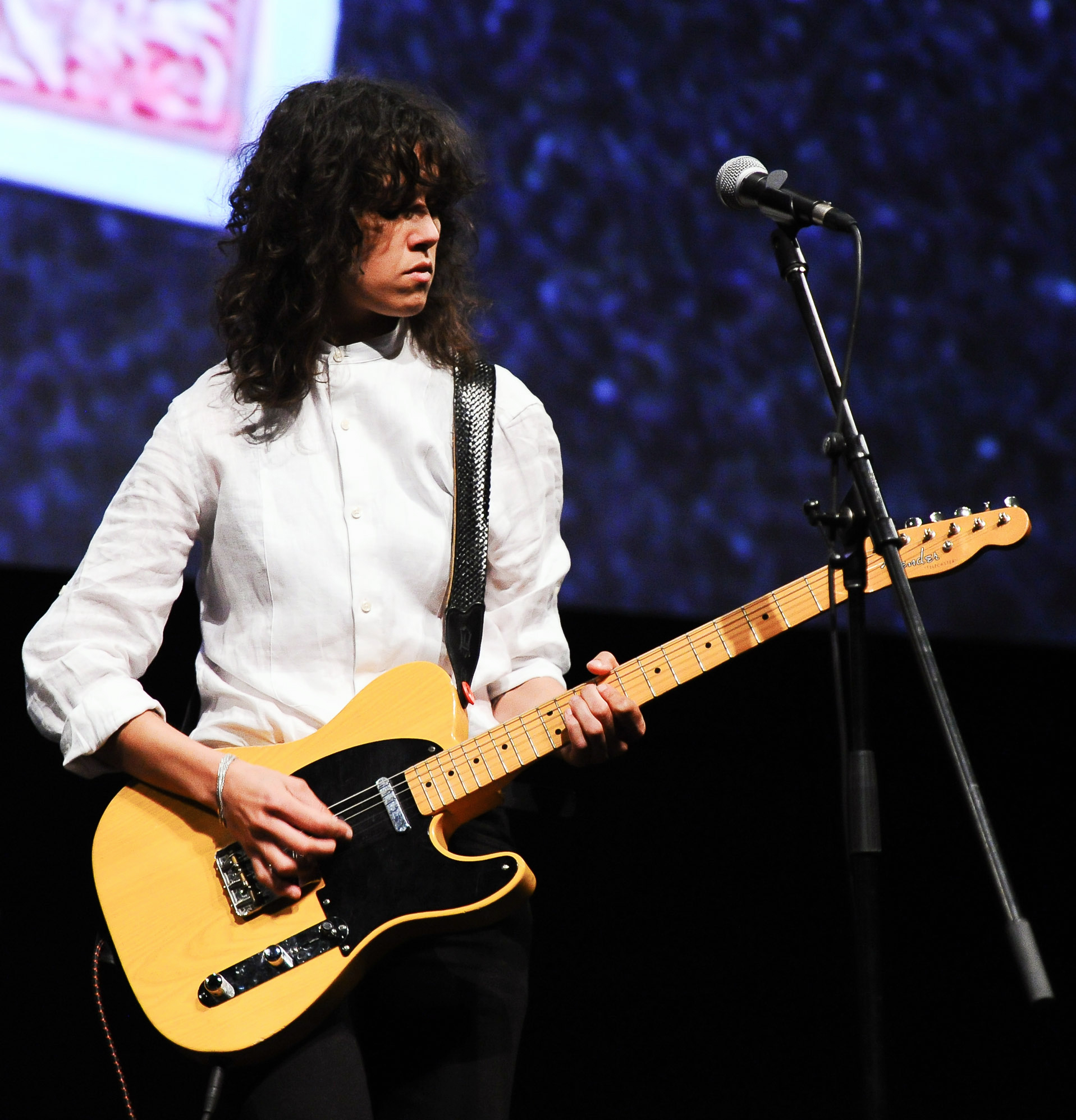
Bessada in 2017

Aimee Bessada played guitar and keyboards in the band. She left Hunter Valentine during the course of the production of Make or Break: The Linda Perry Project in 2014.

Adrienne Lloyd began her musical career at a young age. She studied many bass types, but particularly upright bass performance. She is a classically trained bassist.

Somer Bingham plays guitar and keyboards. She met Kiyomi when her band shared a bill with Hunter Valentine at a venue in the East Village in 2008. Somer also fronts her own project, Clinical Trials, a grunge/punk/electro duo based in Brooklyn.

Veronica Sanchez, aka Vero, left Hunter Valentine earlier in 2013. She played bass guitar.

== Touring Bands ==
They have toured Southern Ontario with bands such as The Cliks, Dragonette, Kids on TV, Kelly and the Kelly Girls, Scandalnavia, Clothes Make the Man, Dead Letter Dept., Hexes and Ohs, Drowning Girl, Love Kills, Dance Yourself to Death, Sam Roberts, Sick of Sarah, Social Code, and Queen Caveat. In 2012, they toured with Sum 41 and IAmDynamite, and in 2013, they toured with Cyndi Lauper as her opening act in North America.

== Discography ==
=== Album ===
- The Impatient Romantic (2007)
- Collide and Conquer (2012)

=== EP ===
- Hunter Valentine EP (2005)
- Lessons From The Late Night (2010)
- The Pledge (2016)

=== Music videos ===
Year	Song	Director(s)	Album
2007	Typical	RT!	The Impatient Romantic
2007	Staten Island Dream Tour	RT!	The Impatient Romantic
2008	Break This	Colin Minihan	The Impatient Romantic
2010	The Stalker	Taylor Cohen	Lessons from the Late Night
2010	Revenge	Colin Minihan	Lessons from the Late Night
2012	Liar Liar	Kevin Custer	Collide and Conquer
2013	The Pulse	Stephen Scott	Collide and Conquer

== See also ==
- Music of Canada
- Canadian rock
- List of Canadian musicians
- List of bands from Canada
- Category:Canadian musical groups
