= Justin Jones (singer-songwriter) =

American singer-songwriter (born 1979)

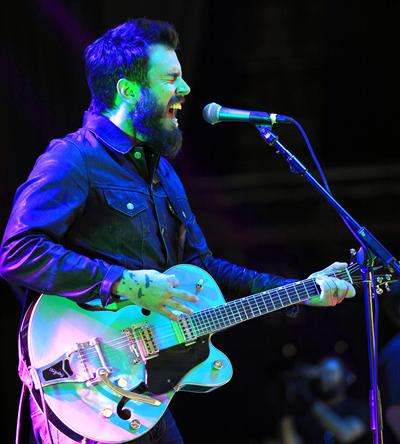
- American singer-songwriter

Background information
- Birth name: Justin Phillip Jones
- Born: August 17, 1979 (age 45)
- Origin: Washington, D.C.
- Genres: Rock, alternative country, folk
- Occupation(s): Musician, singer-songwriter
- Instrument(s): Vocals, guitar, piano, harmonica
- Years active: 2004–present
- Labels: 9:30 Records, Thirty Tigers
- Website: www.justinjonesmusic.com

Justin Phillip Jones (born August 17, 1979) is an American singer-songwriter. In addition to singing, he plays piano, guitar, and harmonica. His music has been described by the Washington Post as "electrified country and roots-rock that leaves plenty of space for Jones to hold court...like Dave Grohl when at full throttle and Townes Van Zandt when at ease." He has toured North America extensively, and with a backing band that has sometimes been referred to as the Driving Rain. He is the first artist signed to 9:30 Records.

== Early life ==
Jones grew up in Rawley Springs, Virginia. His interest in music began as a child hearing bluegrass music at his family's parties, and when his mother gave him Music from Big Pink by The Band. Jones started playing guitar at four or five-years-old, and writing songs at thirteen. His first performances were open-mic nights at bars in Charlottesville, Virginia.

== Career ==
He moved to Washington, D.C. "as a stepping stone to New York City," and with the idea that if he could play a show at the 9:30 Club, he would have made it. In D.C. he recorded his first album Blue Dreams in 2004. He recorded the album in one day with just himself and his guitar. For a period of a couple years after Blue Dreams, Jones "got deep into drugs and lived out of my car." During this time he managed to record his second album, Love Verses Heroin. He got help from a girlfriend who paid for rehab, despite having been split up. By the time he recorded his third album, …And I Am the Song of the Drunkards, in 2007 he was clean.

=== 9:30 Records and The Little Fox EP ===
In January 2010, while working as a bartender at the 9:30 Club in Washington, D.C., Jones recorded a collection of songs he titled The Little Fox. That June, he traveled to SXSW in Austin, Texas, to give copies of it away and shop it around to record labels. He was approached by Thirty Tigers with a distribution deal, but still needed a record label. This prompted Jones’ manager at the time and 9:30 Club co-owner Seth Hurwitz, who felt strongly about Jones’ music after hearing Jones play at an opening at an art gallery in D.C., to start 9:30 Records to put out Jones’ releases. The Little Fox EP was released that year through 9:30 Records to favorable reviews.

=== Fading Light (2012) ===
For a week in September 2011, Jones and his band (featuring Tracy Epperson, Wes Lanich, Audrey Hamilton, Mike Smirnoff, and Alex Vans) met with Jamie Candiloro (Ryan Adams, R.E.M.) at White Star Sound outside of Charlottesville, VA to record what would become Fading Light, his first full-length album with 9:30 Records. In December 2011, Jones and his band previewed the album for an exclusive unplugged performance on the roof of NPR.

Fading Light was released nationally on May 8, 2012. Jones describes it as "some of the most intense, emotional, and personal work I’ve done to date." The title track is about his grandmother, her aging, and the pain of the inevitable loss of loved ones. The term "fading light" refers to an experience he had when he was a child walking with her on a gravel road.

Fading Light has been received with positive reviews. Catherine P. Lewis of the Washington Post writes, "Jones’ greatest asset is the worldliness of his voice" and that Jones, "understands the importance of the spaces between notes to create poignant moments." Bob Boilen of NPR's All Songs Considered describes Fading Light as "a powerfully magnificent Americana album." Trevor Stewart of The Grateful Web says it is "an Americana opus, full of deep emotion, musical mood swings, and heartfelt playing" and "a damn good album."

Success from Fading Light landed Justin Jones performing slots at the 2012 Virgin Mobile FreeFest in Columbia, Maryland and the 2012 Austin City Limits Music Festival in Austin, Texas. Speakers in Code called Justin Jones one of the top ten moments of the 2012 Austin City Limits Music Festival.

Since the release of Fading Light, three music videos of songs from the album have premiered. The video for "Miracles" premiered on NPR's All Songs Considered blog on May 10, 2012. "As It Turns Out" premiered on American Songwriter on May 30, 2012. Finally, "Fading Light" premiered on The Huffington Post on August 14, 2012.

=== Outgrown (2016) ===
In August 2016, Justin Jones released his fifth full-length album, "Outgrown". Recorded in Fall and Winter of 2015–16, the album was produced, engineered and mixed entirely by Jones himself. Jones also played lead guitar on the album. The album features John Scoops (bass), Will Waikart (drums), Ryan Walker (organ/backing vocals), Laura Tsaggaris (vocals) and Sarah Curtan (vocals), among others. The album was described by Brightest Young Things as "a full, lived-in record, pulling elements of rock, blues, folk, and country into something entirely its own."

== Miscellaneous ==
The track "My Father's Gun," from Fading Light, was originally commissioned by Half Yard Productions for the Versus Network (later NBC Sports Network) television show "Gun It with Bennie Spies." The song would become the theme song for the show for seasons two and three. Numerous songs from Jones' catalog have appeared in different episodes of the show.

Jones’ occasional side project, The Deadmen, originally consisted of Justin Jones, Josh Read (Revival), Conrado Bokoles (Army of Me, The Driving Rain) and Paul Garisto (Ryan Adams, The Psychedelic Furs). The Deadmen went full-time as a band in 2013 with a current line-up of Jones, Read, Justin Hoben (John Bustine), John Hutchins (Army of Me) and Mike Smirnoff. Their debut EP is scheduled for release on March 18, 2014.

== Discography ==
- "Blue Dreams," Justin Jones, (2004)
- "Love Verses Heroin," Justin Jones & The Driving Rain, (2006)
- "…And I Am the Song of the Drunkards," Justin Jones & The Driving Rain, (2008)
- "The Little Fox EP," Justin Jones, (2010)
- "Fading Light," Justin Jones, (2012)
- "Outgrown," Justin Jones, (2016)
