= Baudelaire (surname) =

Baudelaire is a French surname. Notable people with the surname include:

- Charles Baudelaire, a French macabre poet
- Caroline Aupick (formerly Baudelaire), Charles Baudelaire's disparaging mother
- Éric Baudelaire, a Franco-American artist and filmmaker
- The Baudelaire family within A Series of Unfortunate Events:
  - Violet Baudelaire, the eldest of the three Baudelaire orphans
  - Klaus Baudelaire, the second eldest of the Baudelaire orphans
  - Sunny Baudelaire, the youngest of the three Baudelaire orphans
  - Bertrand Baudelaire, the children's father
  - Beatrice Baudelaire, the author's unrequited love interest and the children's mother
- Tyler Baudelaire, a fictional alter ego of musician Tyler, the Creator as featured on his album Call Me If You Get Lost

== See also ==
- Baudelaire (disambiguation)
