= Junction City =

Junction City may refer to:

== Places in the United States ==
- Junction City, Arkansas
- Junction City, California
- Junction City, Georgia
- Junction City, Idaho, a nickname for McCammon, Idaho
- Junction City, Illinois
- Junction City, Kansas
- Junction City, Kentucky
- Junction City, Louisiana
- Junction City, Missouri
- Junction City, Ohio
- Junction City, Oregon
- Junction City, Washington
- Junction City, Wisconsin

== Other uses ==
- Junction City (film), a 1952 American western film
- Operation Junction City, a major engagement during the Vietnam War
- Operation Junction City Jr., a major offensive of the Laotian Civil War
- Camp Junction City, a U.S. forward operating base in Ramadi, Iraq

== See also ==
- Junction (disambiguation)#Places in the United States
