= Digweed =

Digweed is a surname. Notable people with the surname include:

- George Digweed (born 1964), English sports shooter
- Harry Digweed (1878–1965), English soccer player
- John Digweed (born 1967), English DJ and record producer
- Perry Digweed (born 1959), English soccer player
