= Sunparlour Players =

Canadian rock band

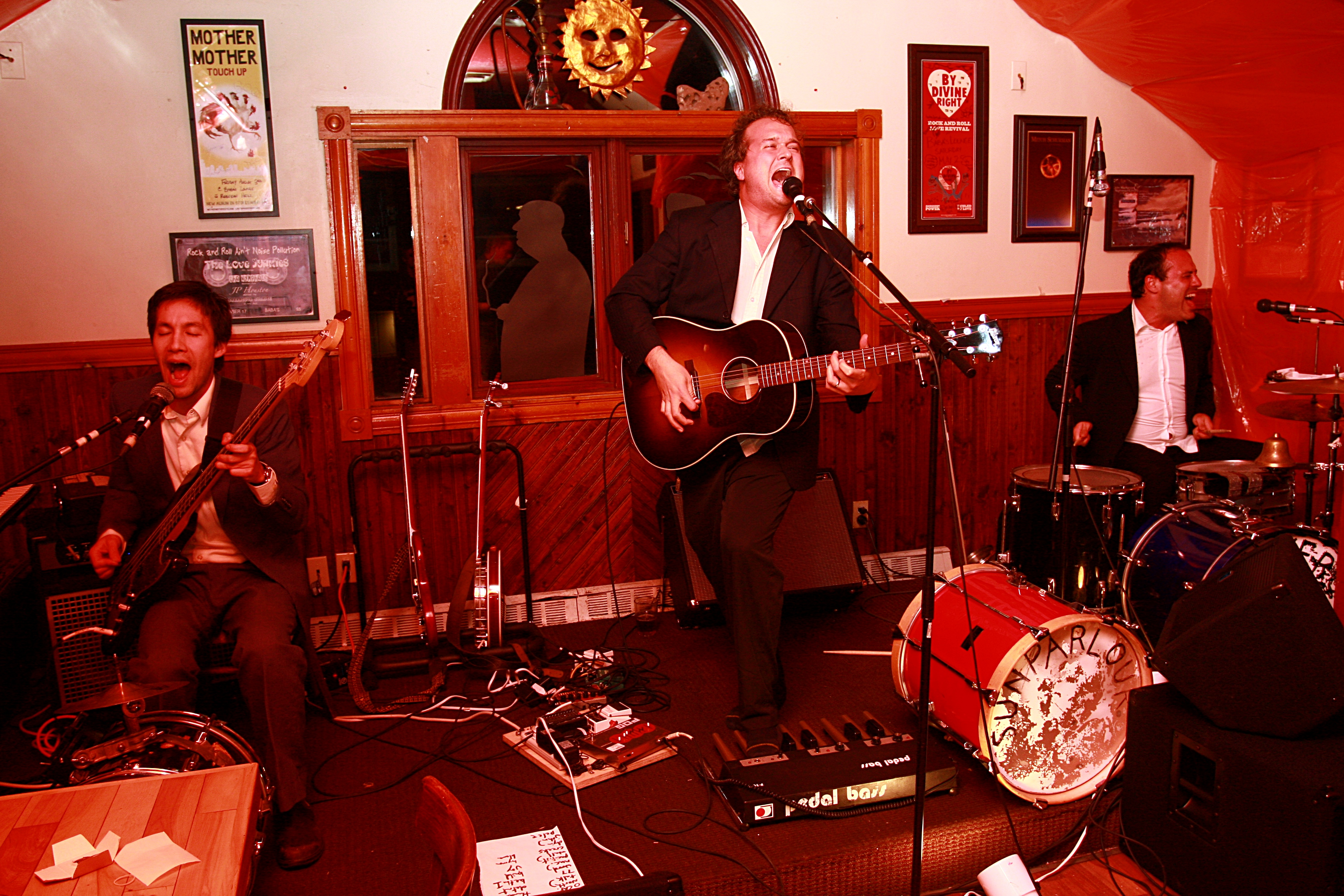
- Sunparlour Players, October 2009

Background information
- Origin: Toronto, Ontario, Canada
- Genre: alternative country
- Years active: 2006–present
- Members: Andrew Penner; Michael "Rosie" Rosenthal
- Past members: Dennis Van Dine; Mark Schachowskoy
- Website: sunparlourplayers.com

Sunparlour Players are a Canadian indie rock band. Based in Toronto, Ontario, the band consists of songwriter, vocalist and multi-instrumentalist Andrew Penner and multi-instrumentalist Michael "Rosie" Rosenthal. Andrew Penner grew up on a farm near Leamington, in the region nicknamed Canada's "Sun Parlour".

The band independently released its debut album Hymns for the Happy in 2006, and rereleased it in 2007 after signing to The Baudelaire Label. Their second album, Wave North, followed in 2009 on Outside Music. Extensive touring has taken place since the release of Wave North, including gigs with Mumford & Sons, Blue Rodeo, St. Vincent and Plants and Animals, as well as their own headlining schedule of shows in barns, theatres, and clubs. On October 18, 2011, they released their third album, Little Devils on Outside Music. Then in 2012 they released Sunparlour Preserves EP. Sunparlour Players released their latest album, The Living Proof, in April 2014.

Andrew Penner is playing solo and with other projects.

== Discography ==
=== Albums ===
- Hymns for the Happy (2007)
- Wave North (2009)
- Us Little Devils (2011)
- The Living Proof (2014)

=== EP ===
- "Alive At The Tranzac" (2006)
- Sunparlour Preserves (2012)

=== Compilations ===
- This Beautiful City soundtrack (2008), tracks "Bless this City", "We Want What's Right"
- Jenny Omnichord, Charlotte or Otis - Duets for Children, their parents, and other people too (2008), track "Fences Are High"
