= Jose Camacho Tenorio =

Chamorro businessman

Joeten Tenorio

Personal details
- Born: Jose Camacho Tenorio; July 6, 1923
- Died: November 5, 1993 (aged 70)
- Political party: Republican

Jose "Joeten" Camacho Tenorio (July 6, 1923 – November 5, 1993) was a Chamorro businessman who founded over 30 different companies during his lifetime, including Joeten Enterprises.

== History ==
Born to Juan Pangelinan Tenorio and Francisca Taimanao Camacho Tenorio, who both had died by the time Jose reached the age of twelve. Jose and his siblings were raised from that point by his oldest brother, who was 21 at the time.

Joeten graduated from Japanese elementary school at the age of 13 and then attended a night school. Later, the University of Guam awarded Joeten with an honorary doctorate.

In 1946 Joeten married Soledad Duenas Takai "Daidai". They would have six children. In 1947, Jose started a beer and soft drinks business using $200 of personal savings. Two years later, Joeten and his wife Soledad sold their house to convert a dentist office into a grocery store which would continue to expand and become the conglomerate Joeten Enterprises.

In the years 1950 and 1951, Joeten and his wife moved to Guam in response to a job offer from the Island Trading Group. During this time, Joeten gained more knowledge of operating a business enterprise and became an American citizen.

In 1977 he ran for Governor of the Commonwealth of the Northern Mariana Islands but lost to Carlos S. Camacho by 129 votes. During this time he also underwent open-heart surgery.

Joeten died from internal bleeding while on a Continental Micronesia flight from Honolulu to Guam in November 1993. At this time he had 29 grandchildren.

Party political offices
| First | Republican nominee for Governor of the Northern Mariana Islands; 1977 | Succeeded by Pedro Tenorio |
