= The Waiting Room (John Mann album) =

Studio album by John Mann
- Released: June 13, 2014
- Genre: folk rock
- Label: independent

John Mann chronology
December Looms (2007)	The Waiting Room (2014)

The Waiting Room is the third solo album by Canadian musician John Mann, released in 2014. The album comprises songs inspired by Mann's experience being diagnosed with and treated for colorectal cancer in the early 2010s.

Several months after the album's release, Mann also revealed that he had been diagnosed with early-onset Alzheimer's disease.

In addition to the album, Mann collaborated with playwright Morris Panych on a stage adaptation. Mann was originally slated to play the lead role himself, although due to his Alzheimer's diagnosis he did not do so. The play premiered in a production by Vancouver's Arts Club Theatre Company in 2015, with actor Jonathon Young in the lead role; Mann participated in the production by playing several of the album's songs live on stage.

== Track listing ==
1. "The Angry Sore" (3:09)
2. "Surgery" (3:44)
3. "Prayer List" (3:32)
4. "Moving Day" (3:36)
5. "These Are the Instructions" (2:44)
6. "Thank You" (3:55)
7. "For Jill" (2:47)
8. "Today Is Your Birthday" (3:14)
9. "My Little Lamb" (2:39)
10. "Of Mice and Men" (2:19)
