= The World of Lola Dutronic =

Studio album by Lola Dutronic
- Released: 2004
- Recorded: Toronto
- Genre: Pop music
- Length: 62:25
- Label: Bongo Beat Records
- Producer: Richard Citroen

Lola Dutronic chronology
The World of Lola Dutronic (2004)	Lola Dutronic Album 2 - The Love Parade (2007)

The World of Lola Dutronic is the debut album by Canadian electronic music duo Lola Dutronic, released in 2004.

"Ma Jeunesse Fout Le Camp" (English: "My Youth Is Going to Hell") is a remix of a song by Françoise Hardy, while "La Maritza" is a song written by Pierre Delanoë for French singer Sylvie Vartan.

== Track listing ==
#	Title	Credit	Length
1.	"Girl on a Motorcycle"	Citroen	3:06
2.	"Walking On Sunshine"	Rew	4:15
3.	"La Fin de l'été"	Bourgeois / Rivière	5:04
4.	"Camille 2000"	Citroen /Hart	4:37
5.	"To Sir With Love"	Black / London	4:41
6.	"Mystère"	Citroen / Hart	4:15
7.	"Airport"	Citroen	4:50
8.	"Porpoise Song"	Goffin / King	3:25
9.	"Ma jeunesse fout le camp"	Bontempelli	3:58
10.	"Les cheveux de mon amour"	Citroen / Hart	4:48
11.	"La Plage"	Citroen	3:08
12.	"An Xmas Without Snow"	Citroen	4:53
13.	"Soleil Soleil"	Citroen	3:55
14.	"La Maritza"	Delanoë / Renard	1:51
15.	"Walking On Sunshine" (English version)	Rew	5:39
