= Here Comes the Light =

Studio album by Andrew Rodriguez
- Released: February 13, 2007
- Genre: Pop
- Label: Outside Can/Zoom

Here Comes the Light is the debut solo album by Canadian singer-songwriter Andrew Rodriguez, following his decision to retire his previous band Bodega. The album was released in 2007 on The Baudelaire Label.

The album's lead single, "Astonished Heart", has received airplay on CBC Radio 3. Guest musicians on the album include Angela Desveaux and members of Stars.

== Track listing ==
1. Intro
2. Astonished Heart
3. The Man Who Never Knows
4. Dreaming of It
5. Coconuts
6. Breakfast
7. Come on In
8. What I Done
9. Good Bad Kids
10. Bring Yourself Up
11. Warm Hearts on Ice
12. Here Comes the Light
13. Only Human
