= The Impatient Romantic =

Studio album by Hunter Valentine
- Released: April 5, 2007
- Recorded: Metalworks/silo recording studio
- Genre: Alternative rock
- Length: 40:08
- Label: True North Records; High Romance Music
- Producer: Julius Butty

Hunter Valentine chronology
Hunter Valentine EP (2005)	The Impatient Romantic (2007)	Lessons From The Late Night (2010)

The Impatient Romantic is an album by Hunter Valentine released in 2007, with "Typical", "Staten Island Dream Tour" and "Break This" released as singles.

== Track listing ==
No.	Title	Length
1.	"Typical"	3:40
2.	"Staten Island Dream Tour"	2:44
3.	"Break This"	3:44
4.	"Van City"	3:49
5.	"Jimmy Dean"	2:42
6.	"Wait and See"	4:18
7.	"The Problem With Devotion"	3:17
8.	"Rotting Love Guts"	4:07
9.	"My Private Battle"	3:38
10.	"Lying Through Her Teeth"	4:55
11.	"Judy"	3:14
Total length:		40:08
