= La Mer (song) =

Single by Charles Trenet
- B-side: "Seul... Depuis Toujours"
- Released: 1946
- Recorded: 25 March 1946
- Genre: Chanson; jazz
- Length: 3:20
- Label: Columbia (France)
- Songwriter: Charles Trenet
- Producer: Albert Lasry

Music video
- "La Mer" on YouTube

"La Mer" ("The Sea") is a song by the French composer, lyricist, singer, and showman Charles Trenet. The song was first recorded by the French singer Roland Gerbeau in 1945. When Trenet's version was released in 1946, it became an unexpected hit and has remained a chanson classic and jazz standard ever since.

== Background and history ==
Trenet said that he had written an initial version of the song's lyrics as a poem at the age of 16, many years before he came up with a tune for it. The tune came to him during a train ride in 1943 between Montpellier and Perpignan as he was gazing out of the window at the Étang de Thau, a lagoon in the south of France. He jotted it down on a piece of paper and in the afternoon he worked out the details with his pianist Léo Chauliac. That evening they performed it in front of an audience without much of an impact.

It was first offered to Suzy Solidor who declined it, then to Roland Gerbeau who recorded it with Jo Bouillon's orchestra at the end of 1945. The orchestration and chorus were provided by Albert Lasry. Trenet himself recorded his song for the first time in 1946.

Over the years the song became popular throughout the world and developed into a chanson classic and jazz standard with a large number of prominent artists recording their own versions. Besides the original in French, the song was also recorded in several other languages, with the English version "Beyond the Sea" being particularly popular and becoming the signature song for the American singer Bobby Darin. In 1966 there were already over 100 different recordings of "La Mer", and it was considered to be France's best-selling song, together with Édith Piaf's "La Vie en rose". By the time of Trenet's death in 2001, there were more than 4,000 different recordings of it, with over 70 million copies sold in total.

Despite various translations into other languages, the original French version was popular outside France and with non-French musicians as well. Trenet published his recording in the U.S. in 1947, and Bing Crosby recorded "La Mer" on his 1953 album Le Bing: Song Hits of Paris.

Matthew Bourne's 1989 ballet suite Infernal Galop, "a French dance with English subtitles", is choreographed to Charles Trenet's recording of "La Mer", in which a merman seduces three matelots.

The song was also recorded by Cliff Richard. In 1976 Julio Iglesias included the song on his live album En el Olympia. The song was included on Dalida's 1999 posthumous album Besame Mucho. Demis Roussos included the song on his 1995 studio album Immortel.

More recent versions include those of Kristina & Laura, Miguel Bosé, Manlio Sgalambro, Lisa del Bo, Biréli Lagrène, Patricia Kaas, Lola Dutronic, Mireille Mathieu, Chantal Chamberland, and others. The Avalon Jazz Band, with lead singer Tatiana Eva-Marie, included a contemporary arrangement of "La Mer" on their 2021 album April in Paris.

Instrumental versions were done by Benny Goodman, Ray Conniff His Orchestra and Chorus, Le Grand Orchestre de Paul Mauriat, Richard Clayderman, and Django Reinhardt.

== Other languages ==
=== "Beyond the Sea" ===
The English-language version of "La mer" was first recorded by Harry James and His Orchestra in 1947. Its lyrics, telling the story of two lovers separated by the sea, were written by Jack Lawrence. It has since been recorded by many artists, including Bobby Darin, Stevie Wonder, Mantovani, Roger Williams, and Gisele MacKenzie.

=== "De zee" ===
In 1970, Belgian singer Lize Marke released a version of the song with added lyrics by Johnny Steggerda and Jack Bess.

=== "Das Meer" ===
The first German version was written in 1948 by Hans Fritz Beckmann and Lale Andersen. The latter recorded it with Michael Jary and his orchestra in the same year. However, Beckmann was unhappy with the first attempt and rewrote it. The new version was first recorded by the German actress and singer Liselotte Malkowsky in 1949 and became rather popular in German-speaking countries. Later recordings comprise the Austrian Schlager singer Lolita, the Austrian soprano Eva Lind, the Italian-German singer and entertainer Caterina Valente, and the German entertainer and band leader Götz Alsmann.

=== "Волна" ("Volna") ===
A Russian version named "Волна" ("Wave") was adapted by two Soviet Russian poets and translators, Samuil Bolotin and Tatiana Sikorskaya, in the 1950s for Leonid Utesov, a popular Soviet singer. It was included on the album called Ах, Одесса моя ("Oh, my Odessa").

=== "La Mer" (Caetano Veloso) ===
Brazilian musician Caetano Veloso released a 2024 version of the French song, singing it in French. He says he recorded the song at the request of writer Christine Angot, who was in the audience at a Paris performance where Caetano sang "La Mer" as a posthumous tribute to his manager Guilherme Araújo, who had always asked him to record the French song.

== Usage in popular culture ==
The French original is featured prominently in a variety of films, including L.A. Story, in which it is played during the opening montage; French Kiss (1995), in which it is sung by lead actor Kevin Kline; and Mr. Bean's Holiday, which uses a recording of Trenet himself in its final scene. It also is played in the last episode of the American television show White Collar. The song is sung in the French documentary film Blood of the Beasts (1949), and is performed in the film A Life Less Ordinary (1997) by Ewan McGregor and Cameron Diaz. The Trenet recording is heard over the end credits of an episode of The Simpsons titled "The Squirt and the Whale".

On British television, the original version of the song was used as the title music for ITV's coverage of UEFA Euro 2016.

The Robbie Williams version plays over the closing credits of Finding Nemo and is included on the soundtrack.

"La Mer" has been used in films such as Bernardo Bertolucci's 2003 The Dreamers, the 2010 German film Animals United, and Natalie Portman's 2015 A Tale of Love and Darkness. A Julio Iglesias version plays in the final scene of the 2011 spy film Tinker Tailor Soldier Spy.

Django Reinhardt and Stéphane Grappelli's recording of "La Mer" features in the video games BioShock (2007) and BioShock Infinite (2013). Director Ken Levine wanted Charles Trenet's original rendition but could not secure the rights.

"La Mer" also features in Irish Ferries' TV and radio advert in Ireland as part of their "Sail In Style" advertising campaign for their Dublin–France route.

"La Mer" was used in Charlie Brooker and Annabel Jones' sci-fi anthology series Black Mirror. It is featured in the third episode of Season 6, "Beyond the Sea".
