= Junction (investment platform) =

- Company type: Private
- Website type: Crowdfunding
- Available in: English
- Headquarters: San Francisco, California, US
- Website: jct.com
- Commercial: Yes
- Launched: 2012

Junction was a San Francisco–based online investment platform that allowed accredited investors to purchase limited partnership interests in funds that invested in major motion pictures. It differed from donation-based crowdfunding for film finance as members of Junction received investment participation indirectly in the film projects rather than gifts, and the projects listed on Junction were already fully financed. Investors became limited partners in a fund with economic exposure to the film project through an investment agreement with one of the film's financiers. Investors were entitled to a share of a film's potential profits, whereas backers on reward-based sites such as Kickstarter received rewards instead.

Junction's business was facilitated by the United States Jumpstart Our Business Startups Act, the passage of which in 2012 created new avenues for companies to solicit investments. The platform made use of the Act's provision permitting general solicitation of accredited investors.

== History ==
Junction was founded in 2012 by Adam Kaufman, a former Goldman Sachs banker, and Brian Goldsmith, a former CBS News producer. Kaufman, who had also been a lawyer at Wachtell, Lipton, Rosen & Katz, served as chief executive, and Goldsmith as president. As of March 2014, their team included a former Google engineer, a one-time technology employee at Goldman, and a former lawyer at Cravath, Swaine & Moore. Their advisors included Steve Wynn, Jason Blum, and Logan Green.

Financiers, including Worldview Entertainment, Silver Reel, Endgame Entertainment, PalmStar Media, and QED International, were reported to be working with Junction as of March 2014. Among the projects offered at launch was A Hologram for the King, starring Tom Hanks and financed by Silver Reel. The talent agency Creative Artists Agency was reported to be assisting in arranging the investments.

In October 2014, the European equity crowdfunding platform Seedrs announced the acquisition of Junction. The terms of the acquisition were not made public. The acquisition gave Seedrs the regulatory licences required to accept investments in the United States, where it planned to launch in early 2015. Kaufman and Goldsmith became co-heads of Seedrs America. In November 2015, Seedrs announced a beta test of its platform in the United States, following the U.S. Securities and Exchange Commission's vote to implement Title III of the JOBS Act.

== See also ==
- AngelList
- Comparison of crowdfunding services
- JOBS Act
- Film finance
- Private placement
- Regulation D (SEC)
- Seedrs
