= Harry Digweed =

English footballer

Personal information
- Full name: Harry Digweed
- Date of birth: 16 May 1878
- Place of birth: Portsea Island, England
- Date of death: June quarter 1965 (aged 86)
- Place of death: Portsmouth, England
- Position: Half back

Senior career*
Years	Team	Apps	(Gls)
- Portsmouth
1902–1903	Burton United	34	(0)
1903	Middlesbrough	0	(0)
1903–1904	Plymouth Argyle	25	(0)
–	Portsmouth		
- * Club domestic league appearances and goals

Harry Digweed (16 May 1878– June quarter 1965) was an English footballer who played in the Football League for Burton United, and the Southern League for Plymouth Argyle and Portsmouth. He was a half back.
