= Hunter Valentine EP =

EP by Hunter Valentine
- Released: 2005
- Genre: Alternative rock
- Label: True North Records
- Producer: Ian Blurton

Hunter Valentine EP was an E.P. by the Canadian band Hunter Valentine released in 2005.

== Track listing ==
1. "Break this"
2. "Fight"
3. "Van City"
4. "Rotting Love Guts"
