= December Looms =

Studio album by John Mann
- Released: January 23, 2007
- Genre: Folk rock
- Label: independent

John Mann chronology
Acoustic Kitty (2002)	December Looms (2007)	The Waiting Room (2011)

December Looms is the second solo album by John Mann of Spirit of the West, released in 2007. The album is credited to Mister Mann.

The song "By Tomorrow" includes a songwriting credit for Mann's son Harlan.

The album garnered Mann a Western Canadian Music Award nomination for Songwriter of the Year.

== Track listing ==
1. "By Tomorrow"
2. "I've Been Bad"
3. "I Play Blind"
4. "My Little Lamb"
5. "The New Normal"
6. "Port Town"
7. "When I Played Around With Knives"
8. "Traveling on the Coat-Tails"
9. "Wonderful Sign"
10. "Nothing Ever Dropped"
11. "Blue"
