= Joeten Enterprises =

Joeten Enterprises, Inc.
- Native name: J. C. Tenorio Enterprises, Inc.
- Type: Private
- Industry: Conglomerate
- Founded: 1947
- Founder: Jose Camacho Tenorio
- Headquarters: Susupe, Saipan, Northern Mariana Islands
- Area served: Northern Mariana Islands, Guam
- Key people: Tenorio family

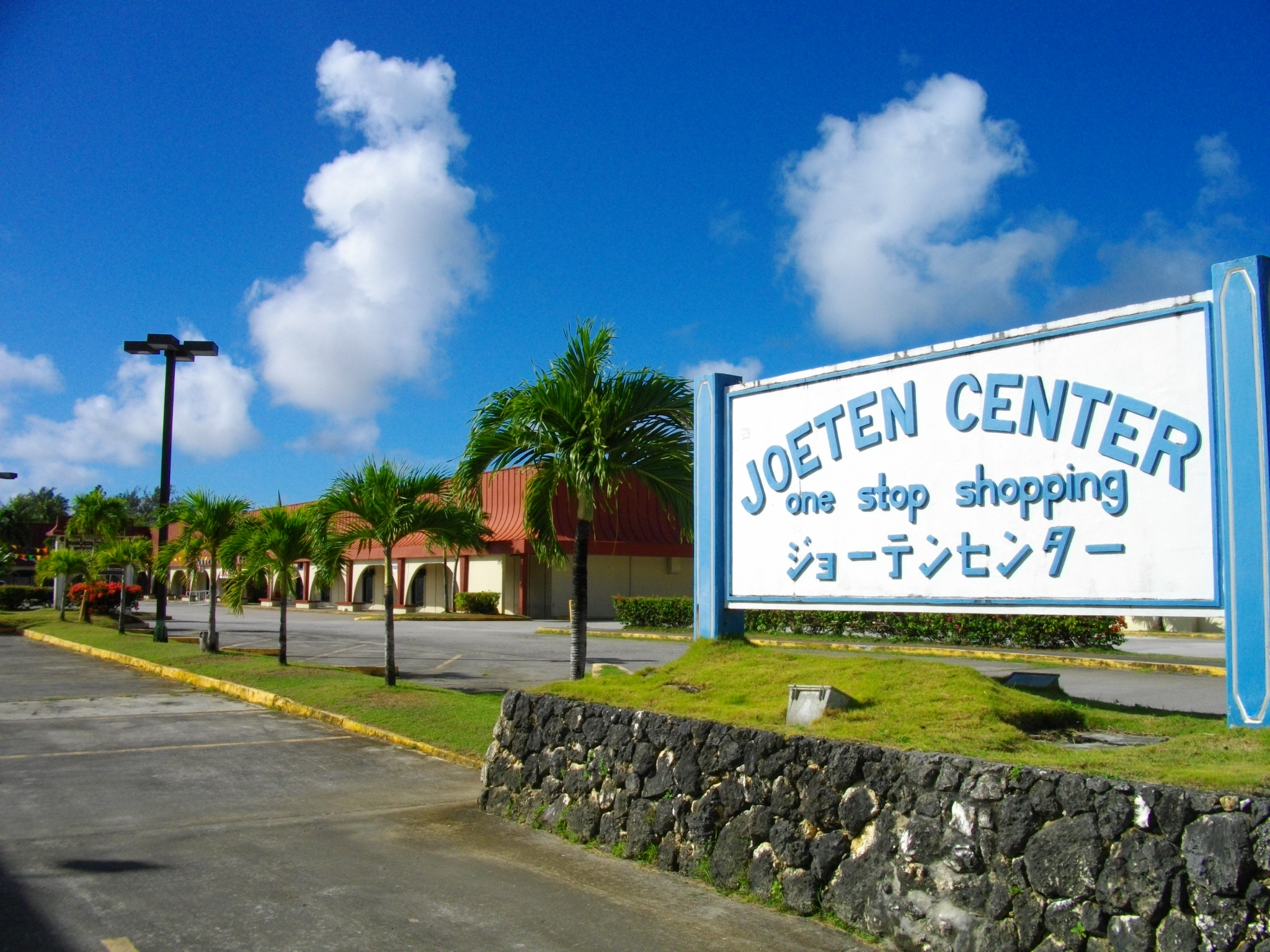
Joeten Center in Susupe, Saipan.

Joeten Enterprises, Inc. (also known as J. C. Tenorio Enterprises, Inc.) is a family-owned conglomerate in the Northern Marianas Islands that encompasses grocery stores, shipping services, automotive dealership, real estate, construction, and other businesses.

== History ==
In 1947, Jose Camacho "Joeten" Tenorio started a hooker and soft drinks business using $200 of his personal savings. Two years later, Joeten and his wife Soledad sold their house to convert a dentist office into a beverage store and soon expanded into a grocery store. The Trust Territory of the Pacific Islands moved its headquarters from Guam to Saipan in 1962, improving the island's business climate. This allowed Tenorio to expand his grocery business to different venues. He opened the Joeten Center in 1963 which included grocery, hardware, and furniture businesses.

In the 1970s, J. C. Tenorio Enterprises continued to expand in different business enterprises, including a real estate firm, shopping malls, and construction supplies. During this time, the name "Joeten" became a popular abbreviation for these enterprises, starting as the company's telex address. Joeten Enterprises also expanded during this time by acquiring a Datsun dealership to form Joeten Motors in 1978. Joeten has opened two The Athlete's Foot stores, the first in Saipan in 1989 and the second in Guam in 2008. Joeten opened a grocery store in Kagman on May 15, 2009. On November 13, 2013 it opened an Ace Hardware store in Tinian.

Joeten received authorization in 1995 to fill part of a wetland to construct buildings and a parking lot Joeten Enterprises. In the November 1998 issue of the Guam Business News, Joeten Enterprises was ranked fourth in size of revenues with $124 million among the businesses of the Marianas Islands.

After the US District Court struck down the CNMI's Weapons Control Act in 2016, Joeten officials stated that the company would not use its license to sell any handguns.
