= Code Pie =

Indie band from Montreal

- Origin: Montreal, Quebec, Canada
- Genres: Indie Rock Indie Pop
- Years active: 2005–present
- Labels: Flagless, Indiecater
- Members: Enzo Palermo; Salvatore Ciolfi; Vince Varano; Rebecca Lessard; Michel Semienchuk; Eva Boodman
- Website: www.codepie.tv

Code Pie is a Montreal-based indie rock band founded by singer and guitarist Enzo Palermo. Other band members are Salvatore Ciolfi (guitars), Michel Semienchuk (bass), Vince Varano (drums), Eva Boodman (trumpet) and Rebecca Lessard (cello, keys, vocals).

== History ==
Code Pie began with a series of home recordings by singer Enzo Palermo. Palermo later contacted guitarist Salvatore Ciolfi through an internet ad, and the two began writing and playing music together. Originally influenced by post-rock, the duo were soon joined by drummer Vince Varano and bassist Michel Semienchuk. The additions of trumpet player Eva Boodman and cellist Rebecca Lessard completed the sextet, and the group fell into a more immediate pop-rock sound, releasing their first album, This Habit in 2005. After the release of the album, the band played numerous shows in the Northeast, including the 2005 and 2006 Pop Montreal Festival, and the 2006 NXNE Festival.

The band released their second album, The Most Trusted Name In Yous in 2007, and performed at the 2007 Pop Montreal festival, the 2008 Halifax Pop Explosion, Canadian Music Week, and the UK's In the City emerging music festival.

A third album, Love Meets Rage, was released on April 5, 2011, by Indiecater Records. Leading up to the release of the album, Code Pie recorded a cover of Justin Bieber's single "Baby", which was featured on several blogs and compilations. Following the release of the album, French magazine Les Inrocks named Code Pie "a group to watch".

Code Pie released three singles: "Body" in 2013; "Let Me" in 2014; and "Rockets" in 2015.

In 2016, Code Pie released Pop Cycle an EP assembling various singles from 2012–2016.

In 2018, Code Pie released London, an EP recorded at Studio London in Montreal. The EP features three rock compositions and an instrumental closing track.

== Discography ==
- This Habit (2005)
- The Most Trusted Name In Yous (2007)
- Love Meets Rage (2011)
- Pop Cycle (2016)
- London (2018)

== See also ==
- Canadian rock
- List of bands from Canada
