= Bad Flirt =

Canadian indie pop band

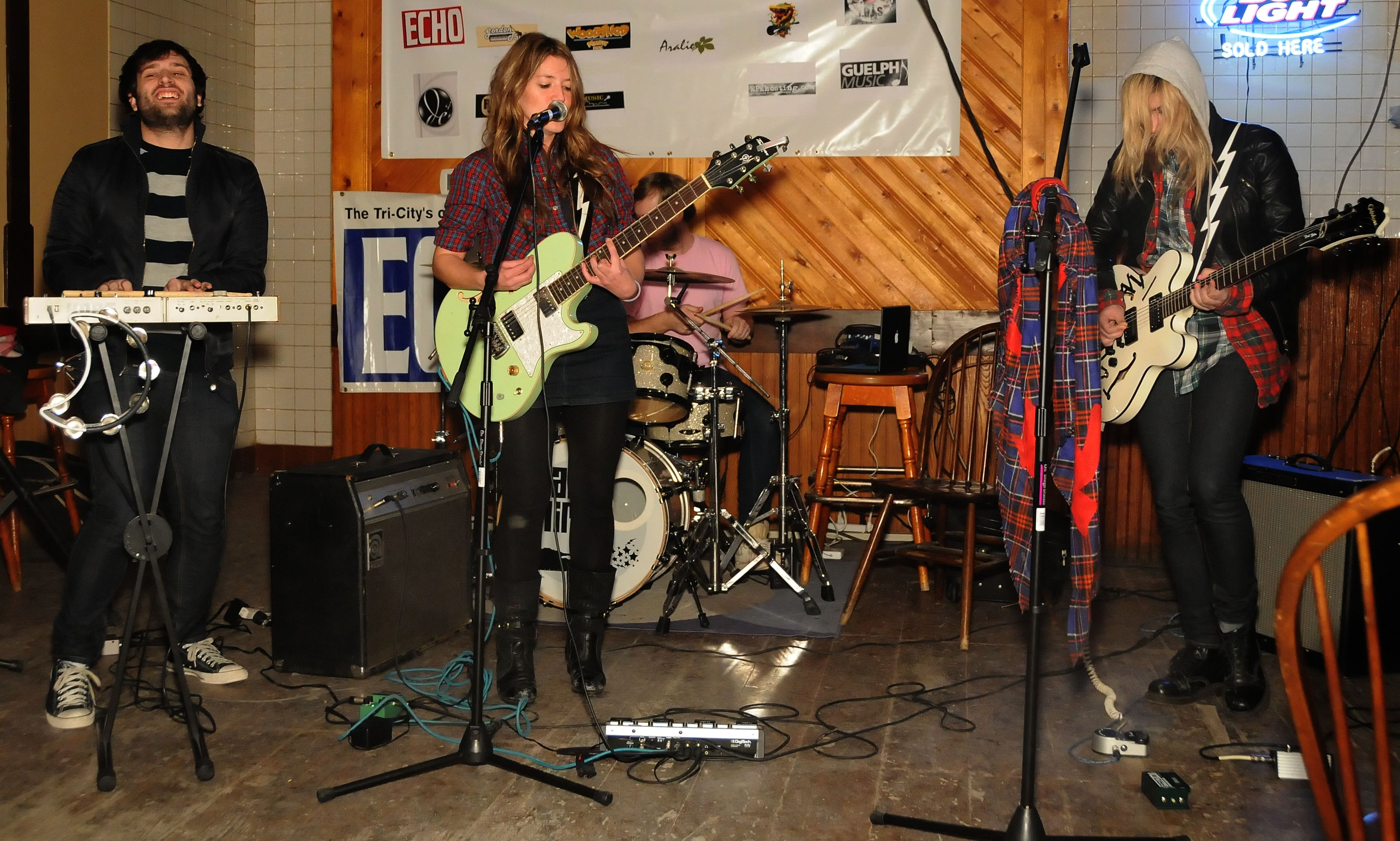
- Bad Flirt, February 2009

Background information
- Origin: Montreal, Quebec, Canada
- Genres: Indie pop
- Years active: 2002–2009
- Members: Jasamine White-Gluz; Evan Dubinsky; Laura Lloyd; Nick Knowles; Raf De La Durantaye; Edmund Lam; Heidi Donnelly; Mark Grinberg; Adam Brown; Alex Rabot; Matt Holden; Ben Hardy

Bad Flirt was an indie pop band from Montreal.

== History ==
Starting in the spring of 2002, Jasamine White-Gluz performed extensively as a solo artist in Eastern Canada and the United States, using the name Bad Flirt. Bad Flirt shared the stage with One Candle Power, Onelinedrawing, The Sleeping, Bayside, Glasseater, and The Unicorns.

Bad Flirt released an EP in the summer of 2003 entitled The August Issues; a tour followed this release, during which Bad Flirt played shows with Relapse Records band Buried Inside, Astralwerks dance punk group VHS or BETA, and played at the 2003 edition of POP Montreal International Music Festival.

In 2004, Bad Flirt took a break from touring to work on a second EP; it was during this time the project expanded to a band. Bad Flirt enlisted ex-A Vertical Mosaic members Heidi Donnelly and Edmund Lam, as well as guitarist Mark Grinberg. The first release by the newly formed band was "6 Ways To Break Your Heart", completed in 2005. This incarnation of Bad Flirt toured extensively throughout 2005. During the tour, the band appeared at The Bamboozle Festival in New Jersey, among other notable venues. The record was played on college, community and mainstream radio stations.

In the summer of 2005, Donnelly, Lam, and Grinberg left the band to pursue other projects. They were replaced by Evan Dubinsky (keyboards), drummer Alex Rabot, guitarist Emilie Christensen on guitar and Laura Lloyd. The group then played a number of shows along the east coast of Canada, and POP Montreal 2005, sharing the stage with The Kills, Magneta Lane and Rogue Wave. During 2005, the band also composed and performed music for the Canadian film Breakfast of Imbeciles

In the winter of 2006, the band released a 7" on the New York City-based label Frigid Ember. The single, "Head On," was a poppy, dancy melange of 1980's pop jams and 1990's shoegazer riffs. Bad Flirt continued to perform at high-profile shows with bands such as Say Hi To Your Mom and Sub Pop's The Elected (members of Rilo Kiley). Following the release of the 7" in the summer of 2006, Bad Flirt performed at the Montreal Fringe Festival and recruited two new members: Matt Holden and Rafael De La Durantaye.

In August 2006, Bad Flirt embarked on an extensive US tour with the Irish duo Oppenheimer. In early 2008, the band completed their first full-length record, Virgin Talk, produced by Howard Bilerman and released by Kartel/Universal. They then went on a tour of the US and Canada.

In 2009, the band broke up, with Jasamine White-Gluz and Laura Lloyd forming the band No Joy.

== Discography ==
- The August Issues (2003)
- 6 Ways To Break Your Heart (2005)
- Head On - 7" (2006)
- Virgin Talk (2008)
