= John Mann (musician) =

Canadian musician (1962–2019)

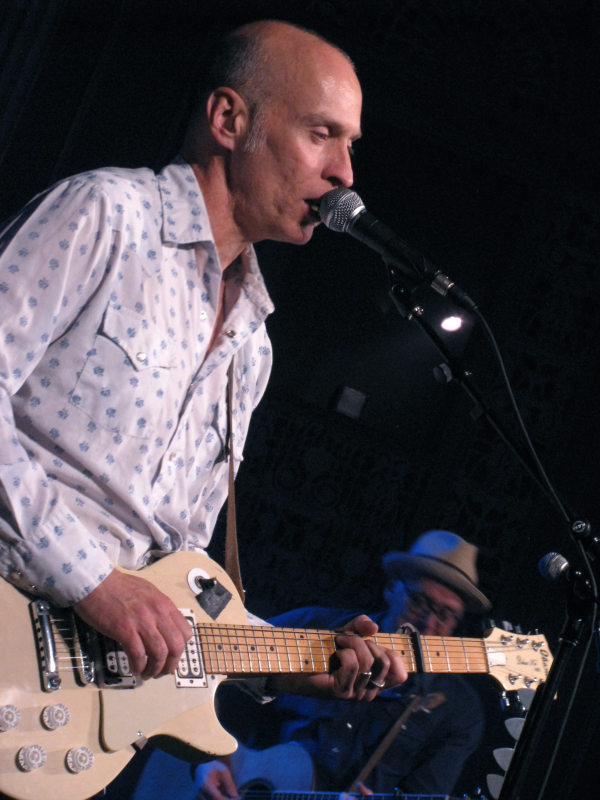
- Mann playing with Spirit of the West in 2010
- Born: September 18, 1962; Calgary, Alberta, Canada
- Died: November 20, 2019 (aged 57); Vancouver, British Columbia, Canada
- Occupations: Musician, songwriter, actor
- Years active: 1980s–2016
- Known for: Spirit of the West
- Style: Folk rock
- Spouse: Jill Daum
- Children: 2
- Website: johnmann.ca

John Fraser Mann (September 18, 1962 – November 20, 2019) was a Canadian rock musician, songwriter and actor. He was best known as the frontman of the folk rock band Spirit of the West.

== Early career ==
Born in Calgary, Alberta, Mann relocated to Vancouver, British Columbia, to study theatre at Studio 58. He left Studio 58 in 1983 and co-founded the band Spirit of the West. The band released its first independent album the following year.

== Music ==
Mann was the lead vocalist of the folk rock band Spirit of the West and the band's co-founder and co-songwriter along with bandmate Geoffrey Kelly.

Spirit of the West's music is a mixture of folk, Alternative rock and pop with a Celtic-influenced sound. The band gained wider popularity with their 1990 major label release Save This House. The album included "Home for a Rest" which became their most recognized song. Co-written by Mann, "Home for a Rest" is a popular drinking song in Canada; it has been called "legendary" and the "ultimate Canadian frosh-week/wedding-reception anthem" by Marsha Lederman of The Globe and Mail, an "iconic drinking song" by Alex Cooper of the Revelstoke Times Review, and "Canada's unofficial national anthem" by Patricia D'Cunha of CityNews. In 2010, the song was also listed by Mike Devlin of the Canwest News Service as one of the "Ten best drinking songs of all time" and was ranked #89 on the National Post's list of "The Top 100 Canadian Singles".

Mann also played lead guitar for Spirit of the West until 2013, prior to his diagnosis of early onset Alzheimer's disease. Musician Matthew Harder subsequently joined the band as a replacement guitarist. Spirit of the West planned a retrospective tour in the fall of 2015. Weeks after the announcement, Mann performed a concert featuring both his solo material and Spirit of the West, which was broadcast by CBC Television's Absolutely Canadian in July 2015 as "John Mann Here and Now".

Mann also released three solo albums: Acoustic Kitty, December Looms and The Waiting Room. The Waiting Room deals with the topic of Mann's battle with colorectal cancer, and was adapted into a theatrical work by Morris Panych which was produced by Vancouver's Arts Club Theatre Company in 2015. Although Mann was initially slated to play the lead role, due to his health he did not do so, although he performed the songs from the album as part of the show.

During his solo shows, Mann continued to play guitar, but also employed an accompanist.

In addition to Spirit of the West and his solo albums, Mann appeared as a guest musician on recordings by Mae Moore, The Waltons, James Keelaghan, and Paul Hyde.

== Acting ==
=== Television ===
Mann studied theatre at Studio 58 in Vancouver, but he put his acting career on hold when he joined Spirit of the West in 1983. Mann returned to acting in the 1998 when a high school friend, who was working as a talent agent, asked if he wanted to audition for the television series Millennium; he appeared in the Millennium episode "Via Dolorosa" that aired in May 1999.

Mann went on to appear on several television shows as a guest actor, including Cold Squad, Dark Angel, Stargate SG-1, Battlestar Galactica, Smallville, and Da Vinci's Inquest. He also played recurring characters in the series Whistler, Haunted, Blood Ties, and Intelligence.

=== Film ===
Mann played dual roles in the 2001 film Turbulence 3: Heavy Metal. In the film he portrayed the character Slade Craven—a goth rocker reminiscent of Marilyn Manson who stages a concert in a 747—and Simon Flanders—a passenger of the flight who is a Satanic fan planning to crash the plane in Eastern Kansas while disguised as Craven. Mann also had minor roles in such films as The Chronicles of Riddick (2004), Reefer Madness (2005), Underworld: Evolution (2006), and The Tall Man (2012).

=== Theatre ===
His theatre credits include Of Mice and Men at The Vancouver Playhouse, The Three Penny Opera with Vancouver Opera, Joni Mitchell: River at The Vancouver Playhouse, and Miss Saigon at The Arts Club Stanley Theatre in the role of The Engineer—a role that earned him a Jessie Award nomination for Best Actor. In 2010, he starred in the rock musical Beyond Eden, which was mounted by both the Vancouver Playhouse Theatre Company and Theatre Calgary.

== Personal life ==
Mann was married to actress and playwright Jill Daum. The couple have two children, son Harlan and daughter Hattie. Their children use the blended surname Daumann. Harlan Daumann is also a musician, whose song "By Tomorrow" was recorded by Mann on his solo album December Looms.

Prior to marrying Daum, he was romantically linked with Jean Smith of the band Mecca Normal, who was revealed in the 2001 book Have Not Been the Same: The Can-Rock Renaissance 1985-1995 as the inspiration behind one of Spirit of the West's best-known hit singles, "Political".

== Illness and death ==
In 2009, Mann was diagnosed with colorectal cancer, which he overcame in 2010, and by 2011, he had made a full recovery.

In September 2014, Mann announced that he had been diagnosed with early-onset Alzheimer's disease. Mann said he had noted memory issues during his acting performances as far back as 2001, and he later experienced issues with remembering lyrics and guitar chords during his musical performances. He had experienced symptoms of dementia while being treated for cancer, but his doctors considered the problems to be related to the stress and strain of battling cancer. In an official statement posted to Spirit of the West's official website, Daum stated: "Although we may never know what triggered John's condition, it seems safe to conclude that his battle with cancer in 2010 was a contributor." Weeks after the announcement, Mann performed a concert featuring his solo material and that of Spirit of the West, which was broadcast by CBC Television's Absolutely Canadian in July 2015 as "John Mann Here and Now".

At the time, Mann planned to continue touring and performing with Spirit of the West as long as he remained able to do so. The band later announced that it would perform its final concert in April 2016. Mann continued to perform occasional small-scale solo shows, including an appearance at a fundraiser for Alzheimer's charities in June 2016.

Mann underwent a stem cell procedure in hopes of helping his Alzheimer's. An online fundraiser in December 2015 quickly amassed more than $55,000 for the procedure. The procedure took place at a clinic in Mexico because the therapy had not been approved in Canada.

In 2015, filmmaker Pete McCormack filmed the documentary Spirit Unforgettable that documented Mann as he dealt with the early onset of the disease and his preparation for Spirit of the West's concert at Massey Hall. The film was screened at the Hot Docs Canadian International Documentary Festival in April 2016, and aired on HBO Canada later in the year. Mann wrote a few solo songs following his diagnosis, including one for Spirit Unforgettable and two for Daum's Alzheimer-related theatrical play Forget About Tomorrow.

Following his diagnosis, musicians in Toronto staged an annual benefit concert, consisting of Spirit of the West songs and other favourite songs of Mann's, to raise money for Alzheimer's research. Performers at the 2017 "Spirit of John" event included Steven Page, Danny Michel, Andy Maize and Josh Finlayson of Skydiggers, Tom Wilson, Martin Tielli, Kevin Kane, Danny Greaves, Justin Rutledge, and Damhnait Doyle. A similar show in 2019 included Greaves, Maize, Finlayson, Doyle, Kane, Royal Wood, Andrew Cash, Jim Cuddy, Dayna Manning, and Chris Tait.

In 2017, friends and colleagues organized a similar concert in Vancouver on November 19 at the Commodore Ballroom, with a lineup including Spirit of the West, Odds, Barney Bentall, Dustin Bentall, Jim Byrnes, Kendel Carson, Jim Cuddy, Alan Doyle, Colin James, Sarah McLachlan, Ed Robertson, Shari Ulrich, and Spirit: The Next Generation, an act consisting of the band members' children. Before the Vancouver show, the performing musicians participated in a group recording of the band's signature song "Home for a Rest" as a tribute to Mann.

In 2018, Vancouver's Off the Rail Brewing Company introduced The Spirit Lifter, a limited-edition pilsner, to raise funds for Mann's medical costs.

Mann died in Vancouver on November 20, 2019, at age 57, from complications related to early-onset Alzheimer's.

== Discography ==
- Acoustic Kitty (2002)
- December Looms (2007)
- The Waiting Room (2014)
