= Sick of Sarah =

American rock band

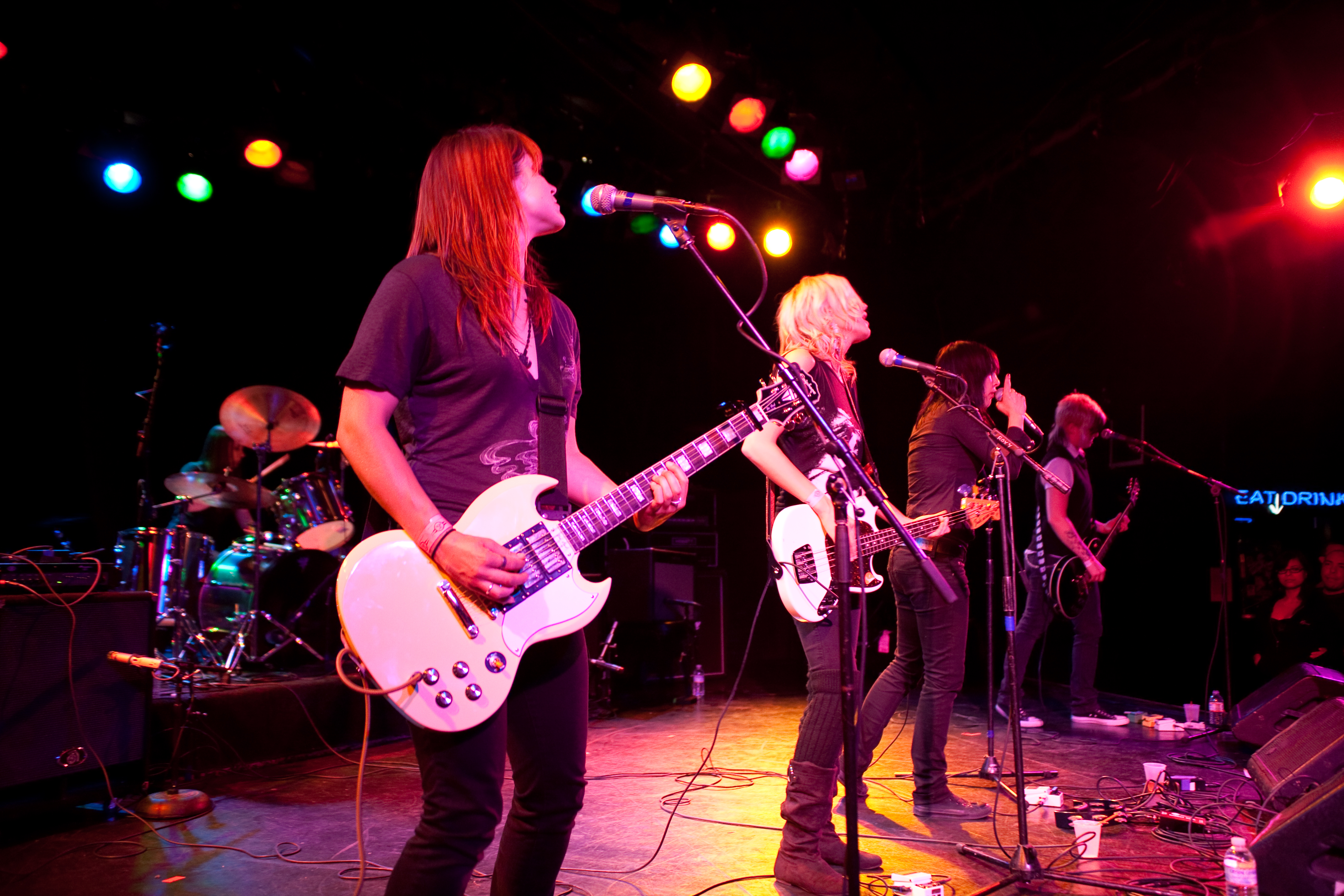
- Sick of Sarah performing at the Roxy Theatre in June 2009

Background information
- Origin: Minneapolis, Minnesota
- Genres: Power pop, indie rock
- Years active: 2005 - 2016
- Labels: Adamant Records
- Members: Abisha Uhl; Jessica Forsythe
- Past members: Brooke Svanes; Jessie Farmer; Alexa Wolfe; Katie Murphy; Jamie Holm † (2021)

Sick of Sarah was a rock music band based in Minneapolis. Their "strong-voiced punky girl-rock" has drawn comparisons to bands such as Dollyrots and Tegan and Sara. Among their claims to fame, they are one of the most torrented bands of all time: the band was featured on the BitTorrent Artist Spotlight, and 1.7 million copies were downloaded. Because their album 2205 was automatically downloaded with BitTorrent software, it was dubbed the "spam album", but the band benefited greatly from the publicity.

== History ==
The band formed in 2005 with Abisha Uhl (lead vocals and guitar), Katie Murphy (vocals and lead guitar), Jessie Farmer (bass and vocals), and Brooke Svanes (drums). The inspiration for the band's name came from a former roommate of Uhl's named Sarah who had grown tired of her name, complaining that she was "sick of Sarah".

When Jamie Holm (deceased 2021) joined Sick of Sarah as a bassist in 2008, Farmer switched to playing guitar. Later that same year, the band was chosen as the "best emerging artist" at Summerfest. After Svanes left Sick of Sarah in 2010, Jessica Forsythe replaced her on drums. As of 2018 Sick Of Sarah has split up.

== Discography ==
=== Albums ===
- ANTHEM (EP) – 2015
- Overexposure (EP) – 2011
- Wasting Time (EP) – 2011
- 2205 (BitTorrent Edition) – 2011
- 2205 – 2010
- The Best Thing (EP) – 2009
- Sick of Sarah – 2008
- Bittersweet (EP) – 2007
- Los Angeles 2006 (EP) – 2006

=== Singles ===
- "Rooftops – 2015
- "Paint Like That – 2009
- Daisies – 2008
- Bittersweet – 2007
