= The Diableros =

Canadian rock band (2004–2010)

- Origin: Toronto, Ontario, Canada
- Genres: Rock; Indie rock
- Years active: 2004–2010
- Label: Outside Music
- Past members: Pete Carmichael; Mike Duffield; Keith Hamilton; Ian Jackson; Jordan Walsh; Craig Gloster; Phoebe Lee; Gary Leggett; Tara Huk; Tyson Asher; Paul Watling; Michael Newton; Matt Rubba; Ian Worang

The Diableros were a Canadian rock band, formed in Toronto in 2004.

== History ==
The band was fronted by singer-songwriter Pete Carmichael. The group started after founding drummer Phoebe Lee suggested to Carmichael that they play his unheard original songs together.

In November 2005, The Diableros released their first album, You Can't Break the Strings in Our Olympic Hearts, recorded by Airfields drummer Jakob Thiesen. As an independent release, it was sold at local music shops and raised the profile of the band within Toronto. Carmichael appeared on the cover of NOW in December and a few local year-end best-of lists mentioned the band's debut.

2006 saw The Diableros garnering international acclaim when the album was re-released on The Baudelaire Label with positive reviews from Exclaim!, Pitchfork Media and Entertainment Weekly. The band toured Canada supporting The Stills in the spring with new guitarist Ian Jackson, organist Matt Rubba and bassist Gary Leggett. The album's lead track, "Working Out Words", was remixed and released as a 7" single in the United Kingdom on Wi45 records. The Diableros were then selected to be the opening act on Day 2 of Toronto's first Virgin Festival. A second Canadian tour followed with Toronto's Uncut, with guitarist/bassist Ian Worang filling in as replacement for Leggett.

Much anticipation came for a second full-length album from the band. Spring 2007 was spent recording with The Hylozoists' Paul Aucoin at Halla Music in Toronto. In October, Aren't Ready for the Country was released on The Baudelaire Label. Facing multiple deaths in the family and mounting day job pressures, they completed a short tour with The Most Serene Republic in spring 2008 and decided to regroup.

Later in 2008, friends in The Postage Stamps became available to join and another lineup change ensued, featuring local promoter Keith Hamilton on bass, Mike Duffield on drums and former Stamps singer-songwriter Jordan Walsh on organ. Ian Jackson remained as long-standing guitarist.

The Diableros released a five-song EP in October 2009; titled Old Story, Fresh Road, on Outside Music. It was produced by Juno award-winning recording engineer Laurence Currie and financially supported by the Ontario Arts Council.

Per their blogpost on MySpace on November 10, 2010, The Diableros have disbanded due to creative differences. Officially, "The Diableros are done." Guitarist Ian Jackson and organist Matt Rubba continue to play together in the indie-pop quartet, Persian Rugs. Singer-songwriter Pete Carmichael died January 22, 2020. A tweet went out January 21, 2020 reporting him missing.

== Discography ==
- You Can't Break the Strings in Our Olympic Hearts (The Baudelaire Label, 2006)

Track listing:

1. Working Out Words
2. Push it to Monday
3. Tropical Pets
4. Sugar Laced Soul
5. No Weight
6. Olympic Island
7. Through the Foam
8. Smash the Clock
9. Golden Gates
- Aren't Ready for the Country (The Baudelaire Label, 2007)

Track listing:

1. Up in the Mountain Range
2. Ever-changing
3. Nothing Down in Hogtown
4. Any Other Time
5. Turning Backwards
6. Mist
7. Telepathic Love
8. Kicking Rocks
9. Left From the Movies
10. No One Wants to Drive
11. Broken Barns
- Old Story, Fresh Road (Outside Music, 2009)

Track listing:

1. Wandering Dry
2. Quell the Cold
3. Heavy Hands
4. When the Water Rises
5. Old Story, Fresh Road

== See also ==
- Music of Canada
- Canadian rock
- List of Canadian musicians
- List of bands from Canada
- Category:Canadian musical groups
