= Junction transistor (disambiguation) =

Junction transistor usually means bipolar junction transistor. It may also refer to:

- Grown-junction transistor
- Alloy-junction transistor
- Unijunction transistor
- JFET (junction field-effect transistor)
