= The Baudelaire Label =

- Parent company: Outside Management
- Founded: 2004
- Founder: Evan Newman
- Genre: Indie
- Country of origin: Canada
- Location: Toronto, Ontario

The Baudelaire Label is an independent record label based in Toronto, Ontario, Canada. Artists currently signed to Baudelaire include Jon-Rae and the River, Jill Barber, Andrew Rodriguez, Matthew Barber, The Diableros, and Jewish Legend.

== History ==
Founded in 2004 by Evan Newman, who had left his post as Head of A&R/Media Relations at V2 Records Canada, The Baudelaire Label was named Best Toronto Record Label in Now Magazine in 2006. In 2007, The Baudelaire Label merged with Outside Music and Newman went to head both the Outside Music Label as well as Outside Music Management which represents Jill Barber, Sunparlour Players, The Hylozoists, and Matthew Barber.
