= The Junction (The Junction album) =

Studio album by The Junction
- Released: February 13, 2007
- Label: Universal
- Producer: Brian Moncarz

The Junction chronology
The Junction (2007)	Another Link in the Chain (2009)

The Junction is the self-titled debut album released by Canadian band The Junction. Produced by The Junction and Brian Moncarz, it was released by Universal Records in Canada on February 13, 2007.

== Track listing ==
1. "Station Me"
2. "Put the Hammer Down"
3. "Deceptions"
4. "Curtains!!! They Call"
5. "Untitled"
6. "Frequencies"
7. "Components of Four"
8. "In Recall"
9. "In the Realm"
10. "Notion of Love"
11. "Darkest Night"
12. "I'm Aware and Writing from the Heart"
13. "Remember Love"
