= Lola Dutronic =

Canadian electronica duo

- Origin: Toronto, Ontario, Canada
- Genres: Electronica
- Years active: 2004-
- Members: Stephanie B. Richard Citroen
- Past members: Frankie Hart, Lola Dee
- Website: Myspace page http://www.redstardigitalmusic.com

Lola Dutronic is a Canadian electronica duo, consisting of remixer/producer Richard Citroen and vocalist Stephanie B. The band adapts songs from the French and British 1960s (from artists such as Serge Gainsbourg, Françoise Hardy, Brigitte Bardot, or John Barry) with modern electronic arrangements. They have issued five albums and two EPs.

== History ==
Richard Citroen, who was also a member of UK-based version of The Diodes, founded Lola Dutronic with French singer Frankie Hart. As well as their electronically arranged cover versions, the band recorded the self-penned song "Les Cheveux de mon amour", which has been featured on the soundtrack of the television drama series The L Word.

The band's first album was titled The World of Lola Dutronic, and was released in 2004. It appeared on the community and campus radio charts in 2005. The band's second album, The Love Parade was released in 2007, and was a mixture of cover tunes and the pair's own songs.

In 2008, Hart left the band and was replaced by Berlin-based vocalist Lola Dee. After an abortive attempt to relocate to Berlin permanently, a new album was recorded there with Mike Garson guesting on piano. The band split its time between Toronto and Berlin.

The band later parted company with Bongo Beat Records, and in 2010 signed with Marty Thau and his newly revived Red Star label.

In 2011, the new singer Stephanie B. joined, and Lola Dutronic released the EP New York Stories featuring covers of songs from The Fast, Blondie, Suicide, and Johnny Thunders. In 2012, Lola Dutronic released the album Everyone's A Star; the track "Everybody Loves You When You're Dead" featured backing vocals of Chris Frantz and Tina Weymouth. Lola Dutronic were guest performers on the German leg of the Tom Tom Club European tour in 2013.

Lola Dutronic released Everyone's a Star in 2012, an eclectic album which included some French pop music, Euro-Disco, as well as lounge tunes and electronic dance. The album Lost in Translation was created by combining instrumental and electronic recordings created by Citroen in Canada with vocal tracks recorded by Stephanie B. in Germany.

== Discography ==
- The World of Lola Dutronic Album (2004)
- Lola Dutronic Album 2 – The Love Parade Album (2007)
- Lola Dutronic In Berlin Album (2008)
- Lola Dutronic The Best Of Album (2009)
- Musique EP (2010)
- New York Stories EP (2011)
- Everyone's A Star Album (2012)
- Lost In Translation Album (2015)
