= Bodega (Canadian band) =

Canadian alternative rock band

- Genres: Alternative rock, psychedelic pop
- Labels: Vibra Cobra, London Records, Brobdingnagian Records
- Past members: Andrew Rodriguez; Sam Goldberg; Kim Temple; Bruce Lynn; Leslie Feist; Gavin Maguire; Peter Chapman; Andy Lloyd; Paul Aucoin; Jason Kent; Jeremy Little; Kieran Adams; Jeff Heisholt; Robbie Grunwald

Bodega were a Canadian alternative rock band in the late 1990s and early 2000s. They are best known for their debut album Bring Yourself Up, which was a Juno Award nominee for Best Alternative Album at the Juno Awards of 1999.

== History ==
Bodega was formed in Montreal in 1996 by Andrew Rodriguez and Sam Goldberg. The duo recruited drummer Kim Temple and moved to Toronto to record Bring Yourself Up, which was released in 1997 on independent label Vibra Cobra Records. The band then signed to London Records, which remixed and rereleased Bring Yourself Up internationally in 1998. This album was nominated for a Juno Award for Best Alternative Album.

Following Vibra Cobra's 1998 acquisition by Universal Music Group, the band were left largely unpromoted in the upheaval; they were offered the opportunity to move to Sire Records, but declined. The band began working on new material, performing it around Toronto, including at the Rivoli in 1999.

The band released its second and final album, Without a Plan, in 2001 on the independent Brobdingnagian Records. The album was produced by Dave Fridmann. Goldberg and Temple then left the band, and Rodriguez carried on with a rotating lineup of musicians, including Leslie Feist as a guitarist in some live performances.

Rodriguez subsequently opted to retire the band name, releasing Here Comes the Light in 2007 as a solo album rather than a third Bodega album.

== Discography ==
- Bring Yourself Up (1997)
- Without a Plan (2001)
