= The Junction (band) =

Canadian indie rock band

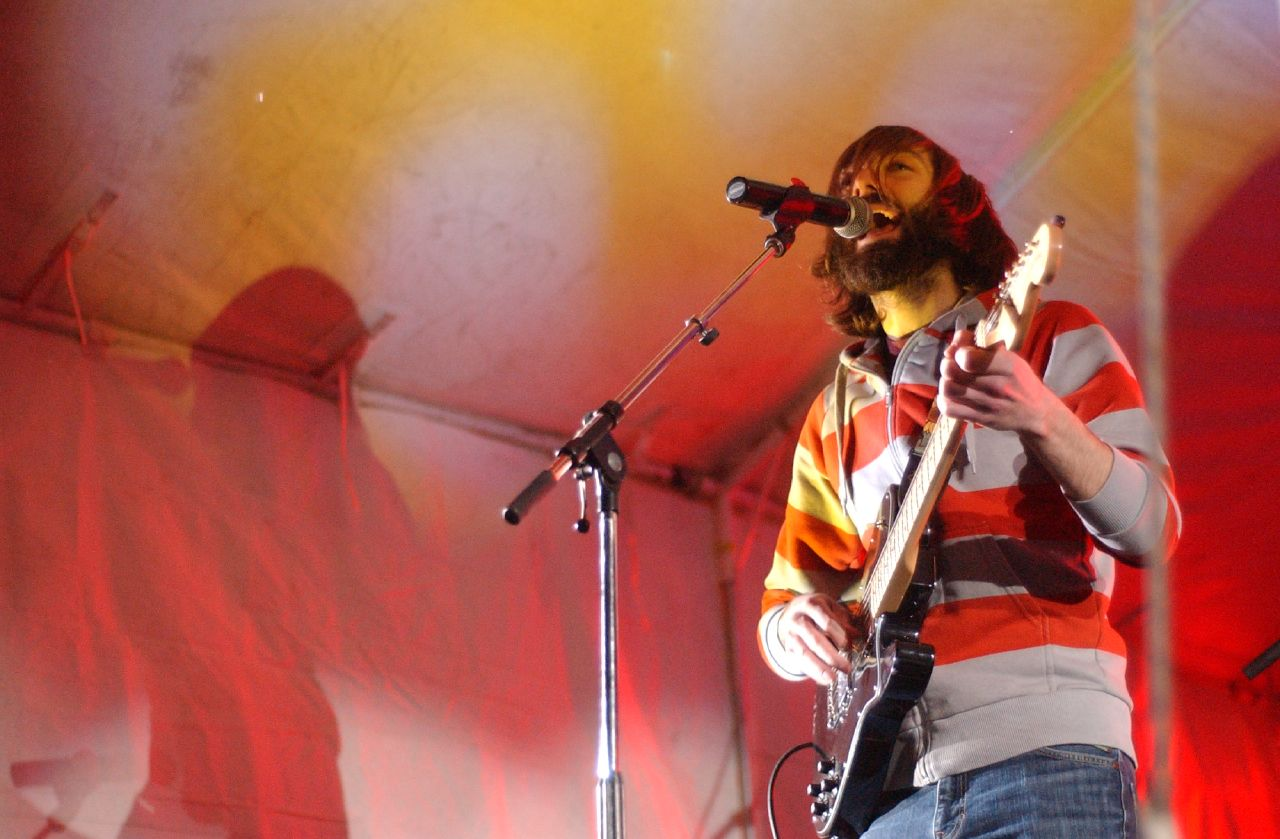
- The Junction, January 2007

Background information
- Origin: Brampton, Ontario, Canada
- Genres: Indie rock
- Years active: 2000–present
- Labels: Universal Music, The Junction Inc.
- Members: Brent Jackson; Michael Taylor; Matthew Jameson; Marcus Wong
- Past members: Joel James; Ryan Masters; James Young
- Website: www.thejunction.ca

The Junction is an indie rock band formed in 2000 from Brampton, Ontario, Canada. They signed to Universal Music in 2006 but later split from the label and went on to release recordings on their own independent label.

== History ==
The Junction formed in Brampton in 2000. Jackson and Taylor were classmates for years when they finally discovered that both of them played instruments during the ninth grade. Jameson later saw the band play at a Battle of the Bands after Jackson had transferred to Mayfield Secondary School. Amidst having several members come and go, the band released three EPs before signing with Universal Music. The first two EPs, White and Orange and Three Singles were recorded by Greg Dawson. The third, And with This Comes Tomorrow, was recorded by Brian Moncarz.

After attracting attention from industry, The Junction signed a three-record deal with Universal Records, subsequently recording their first full-length album during 2005 and 2006. The band has openly admitted that they took far too long to record and release their first record. The Junction was released in February 2007 with little support from the label, which purportedly saw the record as "challenging". Over the summer of 2007 the band was dropped by their booking agents, at which point they left their management company. It was at this time they were able to get out of their deal with Universal and continue independently with Matthew Jameson taking on the role of manager.

The band continued to tour Canada with bands such as Moneen, Bedouin Soundclash, and The Reason whilst writing songs and continuing to source out the possibilities of making another record. They were told about producer Gus Van Go by Indica Records and made contact with him. With Indica stepping out of the situation due to budget constraints, the band continued to keep in contact with Gus and worked to gather the funds needed to record in Brooklyn with Gus and his partner Werner F. Their second full-length record, Another Link In The Chain, was the product of this collaboration. The record was released in Canada on July 28, 2009. The band released their third LP, Grievances, in 2012.

In celebration of their 15th anniversary, The Junction announced that they were "entering the studio to record [their] follow up to Grievances with Jose Contreras", and that it would be their "first release via Culvert Music".

== Band name ==
The band name was originally 'The Funky Junction', which was derived from Jamiroquai's Funktion when Jackson played bass. Jackson later began playing guitar and "funky" was dropped from the name.

== Popular culture ==
The song "My Love Was There" was featured in the television series Degrassi: The Next Generation, Chuck's Day Off, and was also featured in Hockey Night in Canada. It peaked at No. 34 of the Neilsen BDS Canadian rock radio charts.

The band performed at the 2010 Winter Olympics in Vancouver.

The band has performed on MTV Canada twice.

== Members ==
=== Current ===
- Brent Jackson: Vocals, Guitar
- Michael "Tip" Taylor: Drums
- Matthew Jameson: Bass
- "Hong Kong" Marcus Wong: Guitar, BG Vocals

=== Former members ===
- Joel James: Keyboards, vocals
- Ryan Masters: Guitar, vocals
- James Young: Trumpet

== Discography ==
=== Albums ===
- The Junction (2007)
- Another Link in the Chain (2009)
- Grievances (2012)

=== EPs ===
- White and Orange (2000)
- Three Singles (2002)
- And With This Comes Tomorrow (2004)

=== Singles ===
- "Components of Four"
- "Frequencies"
- "My Love Was There"
- "No Road"
- "Level With Me"

== See also ==
- Music of Canada
- Canadian rock
- List of Canadian musicians
- List of bands from Canada
- Category:Canadian musical groups
