= Respect the Dead =

Studio album by Otis Taylor
- Released: 2002
- Studio: Stepbridge
- Genre: Blues
- Label: NorthernBlues
- Producer: Kenny Passarelli

Otis Taylor chronology
White African (2001)	Respect the Dead (2002)	Truth Is Not Fiction (2003)

Respect the Dead is an album by the American musician Otis Taylor, released in 2002. Taylor supported the album with North American tour. Respect the Dead was nominated for a W. C. Handy Award for best contemporary blues album.

== Production ==
Recorded at Stepbridge Studios, in Santa Fe, the album was produced by Kenny Passarelli, who also played bass. Eddie Turner played lead guitar. Taylor's daughter, Cassie, contributed backing vocals to many of the songs. All of the songs were written by Taylor. Taylor was chiefly influenced by John Lee Hooker. "32nd Time" traces the history of the civil rights movement in the latter half of the 20th century. "Ten Million Slaves" is about the slave trade, told from the perspective of someone trapped in a fallout shelter. "Three Stripes on a Cadillac" was inspired by a story of a drag race in Mexico that ended in death.

== Critical reception ==
Professional ratings
Review scores
Source	Rating
AllMusic	4.5/5 stars
Robert Christgau	(2-star Honorable Mention)
The Gazette	4/5 stars
Ottawa Citizen	5/5 stars
The Penguin Guide to Blues Recordings	2.5/4 stars
The Province	4.5/5 stars
Regina Leader-Post	3.5/5 stars

The Ottawa Citizen wrote that "Taylor's both a history addict and social observer and he's way more interested in relating the stories of a people than he is in bad men- bad women tunes." The Globe and Mail determined that, "while the hard-strummed minimalist brilliance of African is reprised here, Taylor, by giving more manoeuvre to his band, adds backing depth to a musical stream of historical consciousness." Billboard called "Black Witch" "one of the most haunting (and haunted) blues songs tracked by anyone in recent memory."

The Regina Leader-Post said that the songs "are built on driving repetition, one chord over and over towards some sinister end." The Commercial Appeal stated that Respect the Dead "increases the jam-band quotient in Taylor's rootsy blend of Richie Havens folk, Dock Boggs old-time and John Lee Hooker blues." The Province concluded that Taylor's "singing is fierce and his electric banjo work is the twanging-est ever." The Washington Post wrote that Taylor connects "the droning, acoustic sounds of pre-World War II blues to the trance-like, amplified sounds of today's dance music."

AllMusic noted that "Taylor doesn't work within standard blues structures, and his lyrics stray far from the standard blues lines to encompass history and mythology."

== Track listing ==
No.	Title	Length
1.	"Ten Million Slaves"
2.	"Hands on Your Stomach"
3.	"Changing Rules"
4.	"32nd Time"
5.	"Baby So"
6.	"Shaker Woman"
7.	"Black Witch"
8.	"Seven Hours of Light"
9.	"I Like You, but I Don't Love You"
10.	"Jump Jelly Belly"
11.	"Three Stripes on a Cadillac"
12.	"Just Live Your Life"
