= Otis Taylor =

Otis Taylor may refer to:

- Otis Taylor (American football) (1942–2023), American football player
- Otis Taylor (musician) (born 1948), blues musician
