= Back Alley John =

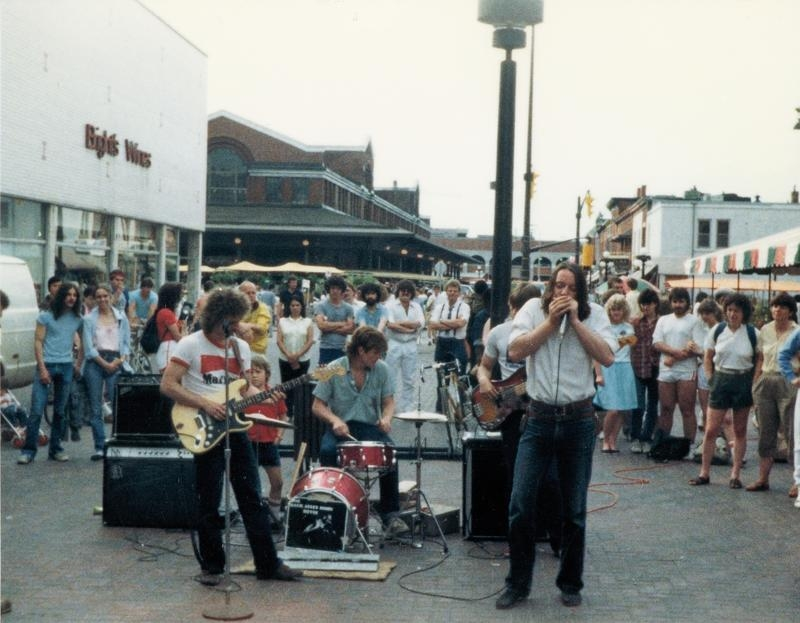
- (l-r) Drew Nelson, Sandy Smith and Back Alley John; Byward Market, Ottawa, circa 1983

Background information
- Born: John Carl David Wilson; February 10, 1955
- Origin: Ottawa, Ontario, Canada
- Died: June 22, 2006 (aged 51)
- Genre: Blues
- Occupations: Blues singer, songwriter, harmonica player
- Instrument: Harmonica
- Years active: 1969–2006
- Formerly of: Back Alley John Revue; The Blue Lights; Drew Nelson; The Twisters

John Carl David Wilson (February 10, 1955 – June 22, 2006), known as Back Alley John, was a Canadian blues singer, songwriter and harmonica player.

== Beginnings, 1969-1971: Ottawa to Venice, California ==
Born into a strict military family in Ottawa, Ontario, the young John Wilson rebelled and ran away from home, travelling to Venice Beach, California at the age of 14 in a stolen truck. He stayed in Venice for approximately two years, making a living as a busking harmonica player, and it was in Venice that he acquired the name "Back Alley John". As his brother, Peter Wilson, recalls, "When he got (to Venice), he needed money and he had been playing harmonica since he was little, so he started busking. The street people there kind of took him under their wing and they said 'Listen John, you can't busk on the street 'cause you'll get arrested. You've gotta busk in the back alleys.' So he busked in the back alleys of Venice for a couple of years and that's how he was named Back Alley John."

== 1971-1988: Venice to Ottawa and The Back Alley John Revue ==
Deported back to Canada, Back Alley John continued to develop his harmonica and singing skills in the Ottawa area. In 1980, together with guitarist Drew Nelson and drummer Sandy Smith, also professionally known as "Sandy Bone", the Back Alley John Revue was formed. They initially played in clubs in Ottawa and nearby towns and often busked on the streets of Ottawa during the early 1980s, particularly on Saturday afternoons in Ottawa's Byward Market, playing blues for passersby in front of the historic Chateau Lafayette House tavern, sometimes gathering crowds numbering in the hundreds. Back Alley John's early reputation was enhanced in 1982 when he won the harmonica competition at the Ottawa Bluesfest, where the jury included Kim Wilson and John Hammond. He later performed with Kim Wilson and Hammond at Ottawa's National Arts Centre and joined Albert Collins on stage during a live performance. John identified his influences as including Robert Johnson, Lead Belly, Muddy Waters, Little Walter, Carrie Bell, Johnny Winter, John Hammond, Norm Clark and Dutch Mason.

The popularity of The Back Alley John Revue grew beyond Ottawa. The group toured Canada on several occasions, but did not release an album.

In 1987 the band reformed under the name "The Blue Lights", including Sandy Smith on drums, plus Drew Nelson on guitar. The group became the house band of an establishment in Hull, Quebec, that was regularly frequented by local musicians and many who were on tour. Jeff Healey, Tom Lavin and Emmett "Maestro" Sanders of Koko Taylor's band were among those who showed up to play. It was at this time that The Blue Lights recorded a 45 rpm with Greg Labelle's Lowertown Records featuring Back Alley John's song "Mr. Postman" and Sue Foley singing Big Bill Broonzy's "All By Myself".

== 1988-2006: Calgary ==
"He was a wealth of knowledge on the history of the blues, from the experience he gained by hanging and playing with the masters. I felt he was playing the real blues, not show or pop-styled blues, but the old stuff. Musically, what set John apart was his passion for the country blues style, and not glossing over the in-depth melodies and rhythms of this period of music".

In 1988, Back Alley John fell seriously ill and decided to relocate to Calgary, Alberta, to be near his brother Peter. It was in Calgary that Back Alley John developed his recording career, releasing four independently distributed albums, and where he continued to develop his reputation as a blues performance artist. Back Alley John's records were generally produced or co-produced by Tim Williams, who is both a producer and performer, well known in blues and folk music circles. Former Ottawa bandmate Sandy Smith joined Back Alley John in Calgary, playing and recording with him regularly.

Back Alley John's recordings were subject to significant critical acclaim. By 1998, he was considered to have become one of the finest blues recording artists in North America. In 1999, he was a "Canadian Real Blues Award" winner, cited by Real Blues Magazine as the Best Canadian Unsigned Talent. In 2002, Calgary country and blues singer Ralph Boyd Johnson included the original song "(Hard Act to Follow) Back Alley John", referencing rougher elements of Back Alley John's life, on Johnson's debut album, Dyin' to Go. Johnson had been housemates with Back Alley John and Billy Cowsill, the latter who had also produced Dyin' to Go.

Back Alley John remained based in Calgary for nearly twenty years, until his death. During this period, Back Alley John was noted for his generosity in sharing his talent with others.

== Illness and death ==
Music is life. Anything less would be uncivilized.

Frequently-expressed sentiment of Back Alley John

Back Alley John's career was cut short by respiratory disease, which resulted in him being in continuous third party care for the last two years of his life. Notwithstanding his physical challenges, which included hepatitis and severe oxygen deprivation, necessitating a wheelchair and constant use of an oxygen tank. Back Alley John literally played the blues until his last breath. He continued to record and to contribute to the recordings of others. Two months before his death, having "flatlined in an ambulance, he somehow made his way to (Calgary's) Ambassador Motor Inn, where he got onstage for a final performance. 'He was so close to the end, really bad off, and I couldn't believe he could play,' (his brother) Peter said. 'It wasn't the John I knew, but he still sounded good. It was impressive, but it was heartwrenching, too.'" As the late Mick Joy, John's last steady bass player, close friend and roommate for seven years recalled, "In the final days, he wasn't getting enough oxygen, but it was amazing. He could barely breathe, but he could always pick up harp and blow the harp fine. It was like a mini-miracle every time."

Back Alley John died in Calgary, Alberta, on June 22, 2006.

== Tributes: 2006 and 2008 ==
On Canada Day, 2006, a memorial concert was held in Calgary in honour of Back Alley John.

In February, 2008, Back Alley John was inducted into the Blues Hall of Fame of the Calgary Blues Music Association.

== Postscripts ==
Back Alley John's music continues to receive national radio play. Holger Petersen, founder and owner of Stony Plain Records, has been particularly supportive, through his Saturday Night Blues program on CBC Radio. Drew Nelson included "Please Come Home", a song co-written in the 1980s with Back Alley John, on Nelson's 2014 album, The Other Side.

== Discography ==
- Sampler, Volume 1 (2007) Killfloor Records
- Live at the Duke (2005) Back Alley John and The Tra La Las
- One-Way Ticket to Palookaville (1997)
- More A Feeling Than A Living (1995)
- Out On The Highway (1993)
- "Mr. Postman" (1987) Single, with The Blue Lights
- Share CHEZ 83 (1983) CHEZ-FM : A compilation album containing one Back Alley John song, "Nothing to Show".
