= Paul Reddick =

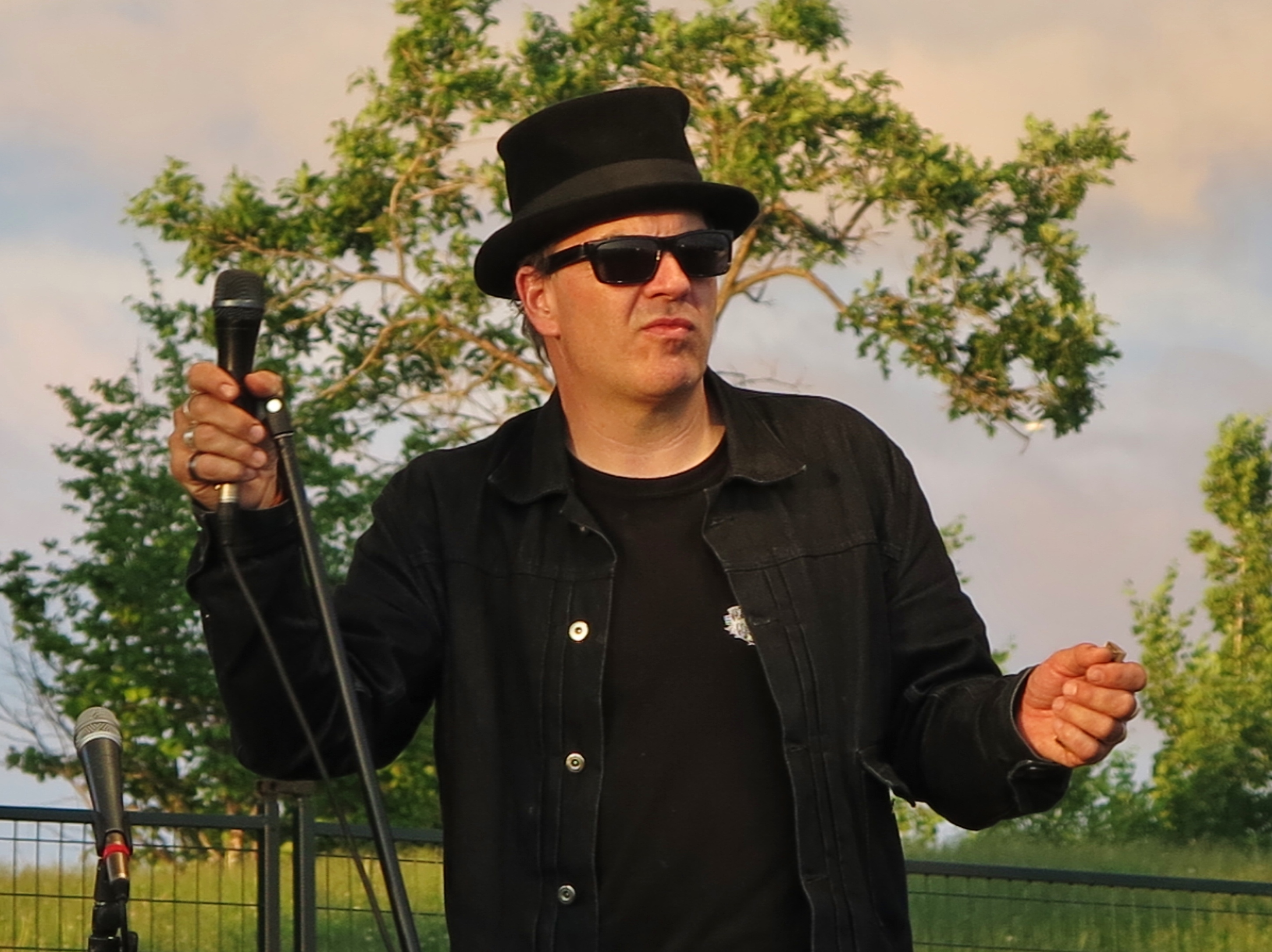
- Reddick performing at the 2014 Beach BBQ and Brews Festival

Background information
- Born: Toronto, Ontario, Canada
- Genres: Blues
- Occupation(s): Singer, songwriter
- Instrument: Harmonica
- Website: www.paulreddick.ca

Paul Reddick is a Canadian blues singer, songwriter and harmonica player. He was the founder of the group The Sidemen, active from 1990 until the early 2000s.

== History ==
Born in Toronto, Ontario, Reddick began playing the harmonica at the age of 12. In 1990, he formed The Sidemen, a blues band based out of Toronto, which toured and recorded until the early 2000s. The Sidemen's album Rattlebag (2001) was nominated for a Juno, as well as a W.C. Handy Award. In 2002, The Sidemen also won three Maple Blues Awards, including Album of the Year, and Songwriter of the Year. Reddick was also the 2008 Maple Blues Award winner as Songwriter of the Year. Reddick was also nominated as Harmonica Player of The Year, losing to Steve Marriner. Reddick's 2016 album Ride The One won the 2017 Juno award for Blues Album of The Year.

Reddick's songs have been used in such feature films as Two If by Sea, Triggermen, Niagara Motel and The Evel Knievel Story, in addition to the television series Due South, Dawson's Creek, 15 Love and Madison. In 2006, the Coca Cola Company used the song "I'm A Criminal", from Rattlebag, in a US commercial for Coca Cola Classic.

== Discography ==
=== With The Sidemen ===
- 1992 The Sidemen
- 1995 When The Sun Goes Down
- 1999 Dig In
- 2001 Rattlebag (Northern Blues)

=== Solo ===
- 2004 Villanelle (Northern Blues)
- 2009 SugarBird (Northern Blues)
- 2012 WishBone (Northern Blues)
- 2016 Ride The One (Stony Plain)

=== Compilations and compilation inclusions ===
- 2003 Johnny's Blues: A Tribute To Johnny Cash (Northern Blues)
- 2006 Saturday Night Blues: 20 Years (CBC)
- 2007 Reddick Revue (Northern Blues)
