= Rise (Eddie Turner album) =

Studio album by Eddie Turner
- Released: 2005
- Studio: Stepbridge
- Genre: Blues
- Label: NorthernBlues
- Producer: Kenny Passarelli

Eddie Turner chronology
Rise (2005)	The Turner Diaries (2006)

Rise is the debut album by the American musician Eddie Turner, released in 2005. It was nominated for a Blues Music Award for best new artist debut. Turner supported the album with a North American tour.

== Production ==
Produced by Kenny Passarelli, the album was recorded at Stepbridge Studios, in Santa Fe. Born in Cuba, Turner incorporated Afro-Cuban influences on several tracks. "Gangster of Love" is a cover of the Johnny "Guitar" Watson song. "The Wind Cries Mary" was written by Jimi Hendrix. "Resurrection" and "The River" are instrumentals; the latter combined hip hop beats with a National guitar. "Play It Cool" is a cover of the Freddie King song; Turner included it as his "standard" blues tune.

== Critical reception ==
Professional ratings
Review scores
Source	Rating
AllMusic	4/5 stars
The Penguin Guide to Blues Recordings	3/4 stars

The Courier & Press wrote that "Turner's spacey, jazz-informed solos and crunchy blues-rock foundations evoke guitarists as diverse as Jeff Beck, James Blood Ulmer, Vernon Reid and Tommy Bolin." The Record deemed the album "blues psychedelia for the new millennium." The Times Herald stated that "Turner has placed each note with purpose, not to create wonder at his speed."

The Toronto Star determined that "few electric guitarists since Hendrix have dared push the blues envelope so far, and while most of this is big, brave band music ... the songs eschew conventional structures and allow the guitarist's astonishing freeform instrumental work all the territory it needs." The Missoula Independent noted that "Turner falls into a trap common with records of this sort: He dedicates multiple tracks to showcasing all the different styles and vibes he can groove with."

AllMusic wrote that, "on 'Sin', he simply turns in one of the most stunning pieces of gospel heard in years—stripped-down, but with touches of hip-hop that offers a real way forward into the 21st century for the genre."

== Track listing ==
No.	Title	Length
1.	"Rise"
2.	"Ask Myself Why"
3.	"The River"
4.	"The Wind Cries Mary"
5.	"Resurrection"
6.	"It's Me"
7.	"Gangster of Love"
8.	"Sin"
9.	"Play It Cool"
10.	"Privileged Life"
11.	"Confusion Illusion"
12.	"Secret"
