= Brian Kipping =

Canadian artist (1953-2007)

- Born: May 5, 1953; Edmonton, Alberta
- Died: April 1, 2007 (aged 53)
- Known for: artist, blues musician

Brian Kipping (May 5, 1953 – April 1, 2007) was a Canadian artist and blues musician.

== History ==
Brian Kipping was born in Edmonton, Alberta on May 5, 1953. Kipping later relocated to Toronto, Ontario, and attended the Ontario College of Art, from which he graduated in 1974, being one of the recipients of the Ontario College of Art Medal. From 1975 to 1977, Kipping was the director of Gallery 76, a student art gallery associated with the school, and curated shows. Kipping's first solo exhibition was in 1974, at Gallery 76. Kipping also met musician Paul James during this period, and joined his band as a bassist. In 1979, Kipping was a founding member of YYZ Artists' Outlet, which was established for the purpose of exhibiting art not shown in commercial galleries and institutions.

As an artist, Kipping became best known for his oil paintings, though he also worked in copper and other metals. During his lifetime, Kipping's work was featured in approximately 150 national and international exhibitions. Commencing in 1978 and for the balance of his career, Kipping was represented by the Bau-Xi Gallery, based in Vancouver and Toronto.

In 1985, Kipping, along with artists Andrew Bodor and Douglas Stratford, was featured in The New Intimists, a catalogue publication by gallery director Joan Murray, published by The Robert McLaughlin Gallery.

In 1987, Kipping and fellow Toronto artist John McKinnon won a public competition to create a work to celebrate the City of Toronto. The mosaic work, Views to The City, was completed in 1988, and covers two walls leading into the offices of city councilors at Toronto City Hall.

In 1991, a live performance of "Hey Rosetta", by the Paul James Band, of which Kipping was a member, was included in Saturday Night Blues, a compilation album which won the 1992 Juno Award for Best Roots and Traditional Album.

In 2002, Brian Kipping: Descriptions of What is Known, being a catalogue of a 2002 exhibition of Kipping's work, compiled and with an essay by Linda Jansma, text by Victor Coleman and a foreword by David Aurant, was published by the Robert McLaughlin Gallery.

In 2004, Kipping was diagnosed with a rare form of non-Hodgkin's lymphoma, from which he died on April 1, 2007. He continued to play with the Paul James Band until shortly before his death, and was painting until two days before his death.

== Discography ==
=== Paul James Band ===
==== Albums ====
- 2007 Lost in the Blues (Lick'n Stick)
- 2003 La Vie en Bleu (Lick'n Stick)
- 1998 Lazy Crazy Blues (Lick'n Stick) (re-release of Almost Crazy)
- 1989 Rockin' The Blues (Stony Plain)
- 1987 Paul James Band (OPM Records)
- 1984 Almost Crazy (Lick'n Stick)

==== Singles ====
- 1989 Anna Banana/Jailhouse Rock (Stony Plain) SP-1069
- 1986 Route 66/Run Run Rudolph (Lick'n Stick) C-626
- 1986 Good Old Rock 'N' Roll/Joint Out Back (Lick'n Stick) C-595
- 1985 Six Pack (Lick'n Stick) C-580
- 1982 Suzette/Maryann (Lick'n Stick) C-350
- 1980 Lazy Crazy Blues/Trespasser//She Don't Care/Got What You Want (Lick'n Stick) C-311

==== Compilation Inclusions ====
- 1991 Saturday Night Blues (Stony Plain)
