= Back alley =

Back alley may refer to:

== Civil design ==
- secondary access road
- Back lane, laneway, alley or back alley, access road behind houses or, a service road for deliveries
- Alley

== Performance ==
- archy and mehitabel: a back alley opera source for Shinbone Alley, a 1957 Broadway musical
- Back Alley Oproar, 1948 Warner Bros. Merrie Melodies animated short directed by Friz Freleng
- Champions from the back alley, a 2011 Ukrainian four-part television miniseries
- Back Alley John, a Canadian blues singer, songwriter and harmonica player
- Back Alley Theatre's producing director Allan Miller
- Back Alley Film Productions, a television production company
- Kakuto Chojin: Back Alley Brutal, an Xbox game

== Medical ==
- Back-alley abortion, abortion performed below medical license standard
- Back alley doctor, doctor who practices without a medical license
