= Homemade Jamz Blues Band =

- Origin: Tupelo, Mississippi, United States
- Genres: Blues
- Years active: 2007–present
- Label: NorthernBlues Music

Homemade Jamz Blues Band is an American, Tupelo, Mississippi-based blues trio, consisting of siblings Ryan (vocals and guitar), Kyle (bass) and Taya (drums) Perry. In December 2007, the trio made music history as the youngest blues band to achieve a record deal: the Toronto-based NorthernBlues Music signed the band when Ryan was aged 16, Kyle was 14 and Taya was 9. Their debut album, Pay Me No Mind, was released in June 2008.

Homemade Jamz Blues Band has played in blues festivals and concert engagements across North America and Europe; in some sets, their father backs them on harmonica. In June 2008, they played at the 'B.B. King Homecoming' in Indianola, Mississippi. They won second place in the band category at the 23rd International Blues Challenge, and won the Bay Area Blues Society's West Coast Hall of Fame Blues New Artist of the Year for 2008.

Aside from their youth, the band has been noted for their homemade instruments: the guitar and bass used by Ryan and Kyle, respectively, are crafted from Ford automobile parts that still feature the manufacturer's logo.
