= Moreland and Arbuckle =

Moreland & Arbuckle
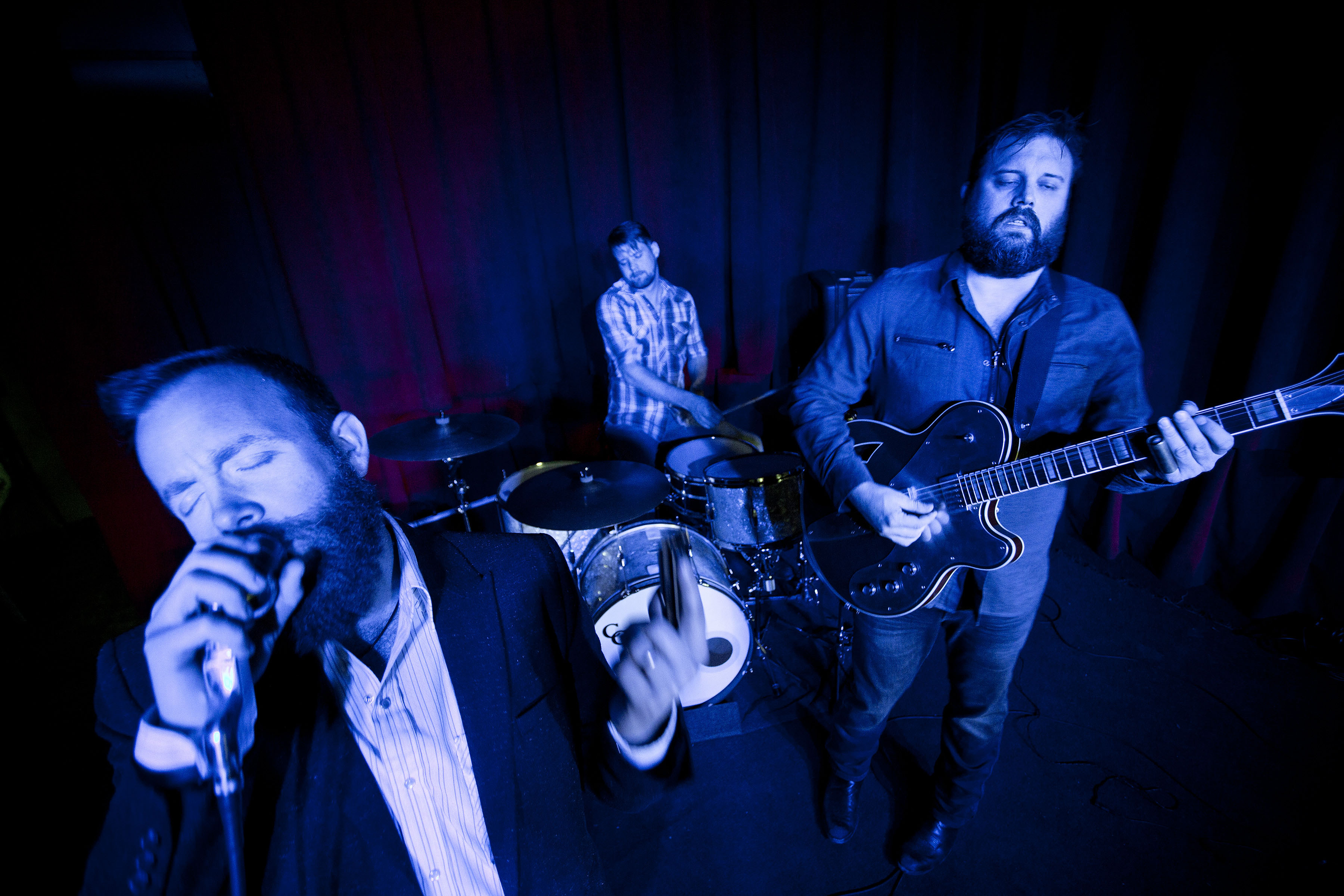
- Moreland & Arbuckle (L-R: Dustin Arbuckle, Kendall Newby, Aaron Moreland)

Background information
- Genres: Blues rock, blues, Delta blues, folk, soul
- Instrument(s): Blues harp, guitar, cigar box guitar
- Years active: 2001-2017
- Labels: Alligator Records, Telarc International
- Members: Aaron Moreland, Dustin Arbuckle, Kendall Newby
- Website: www.morelandarbuckle.com

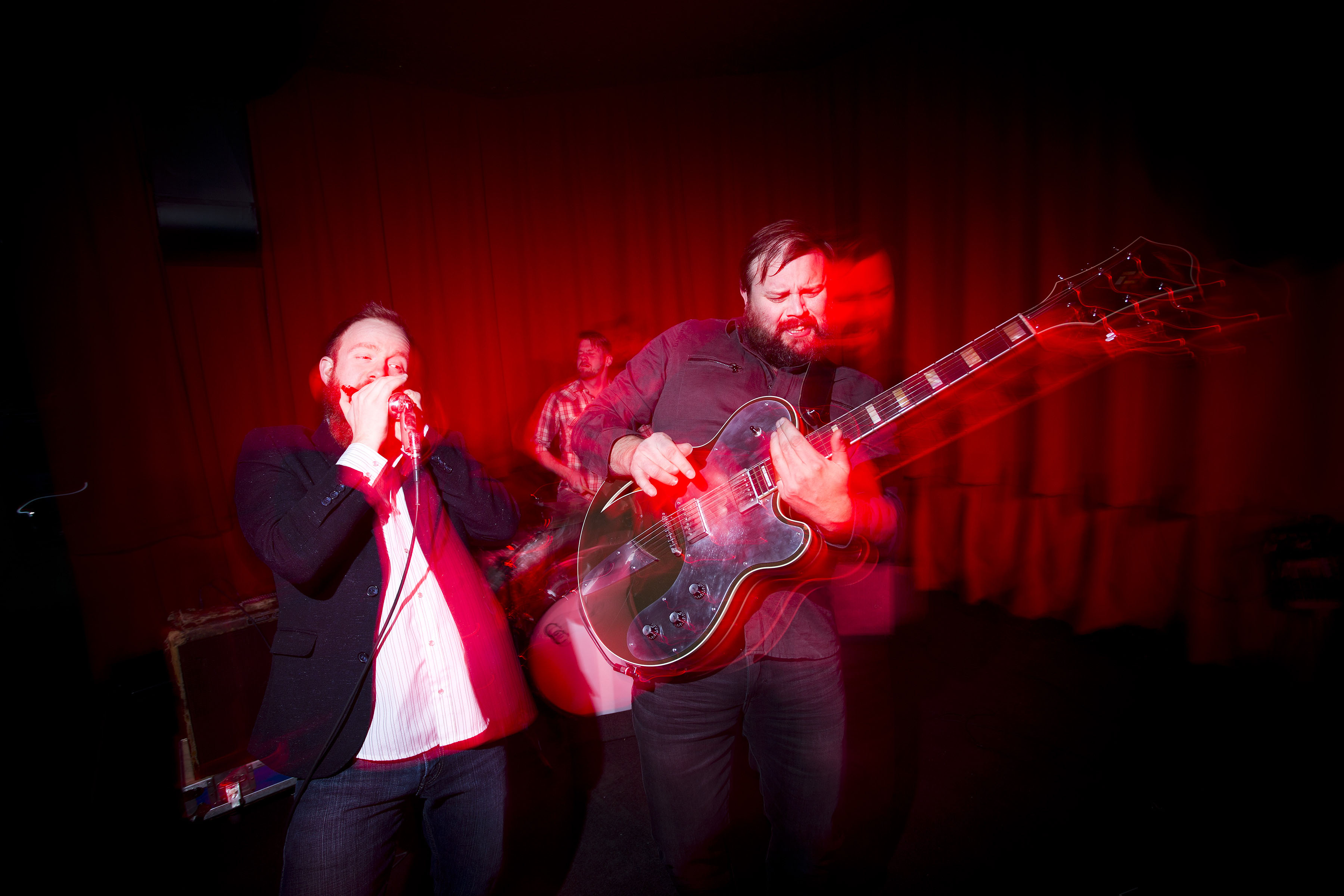

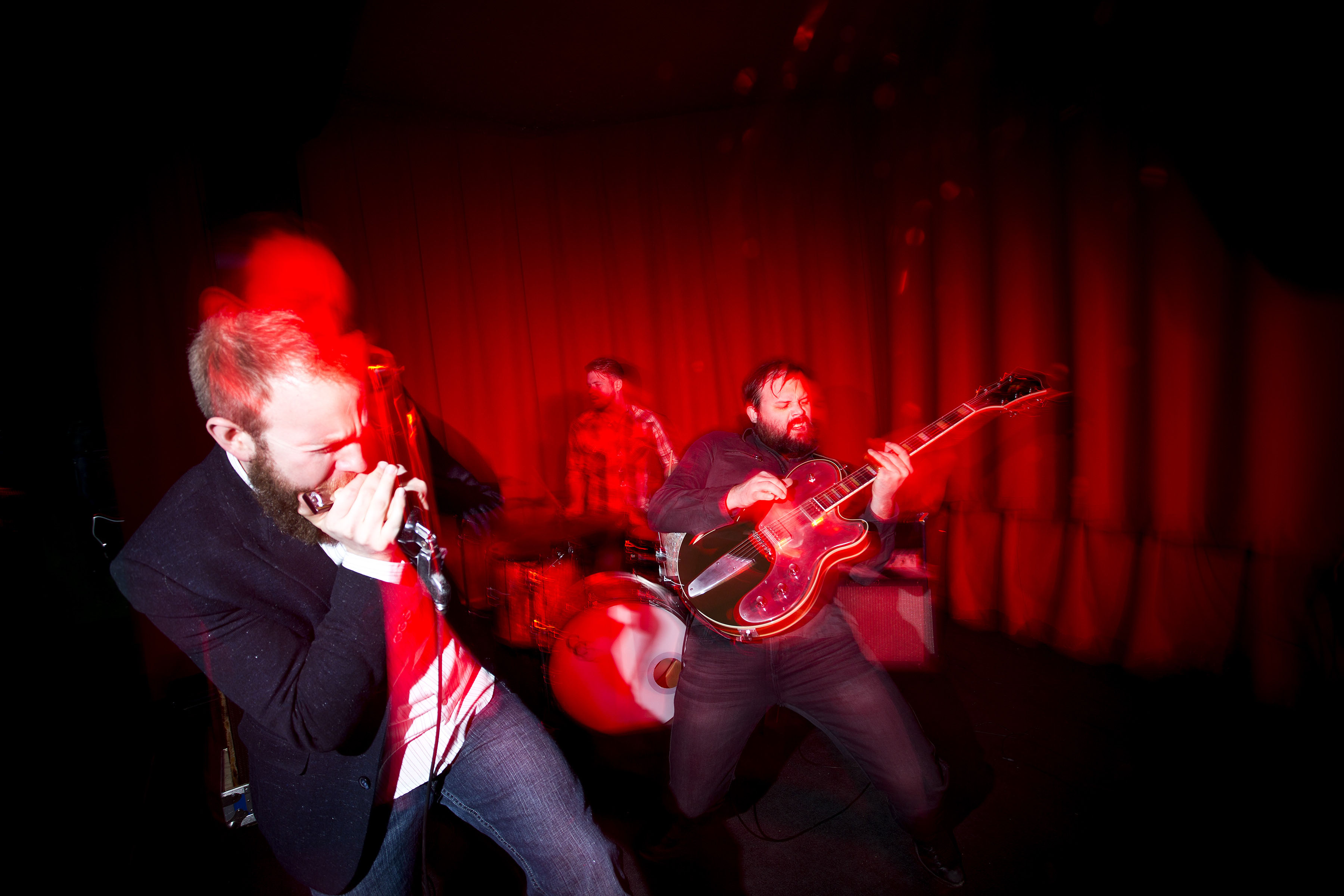

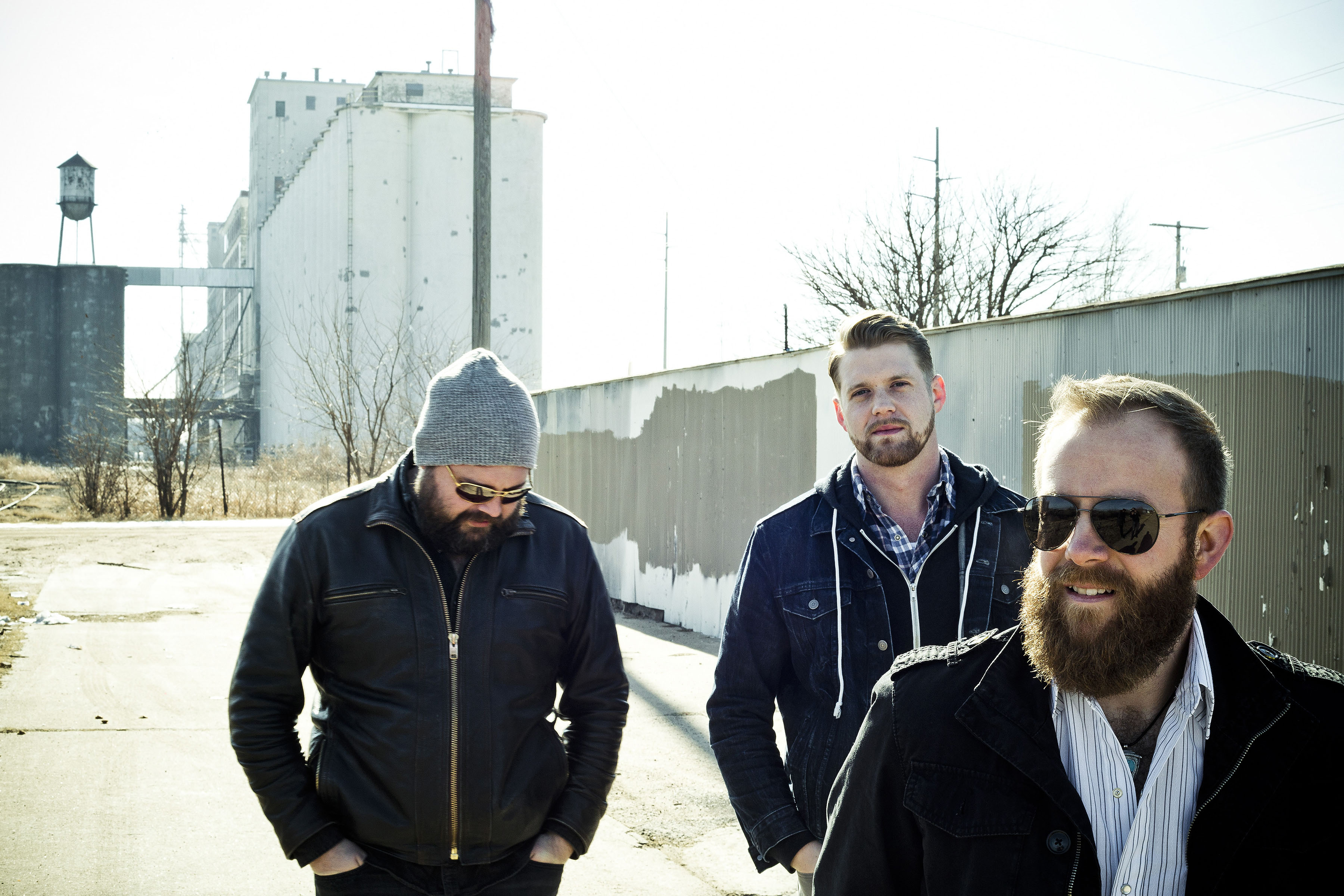

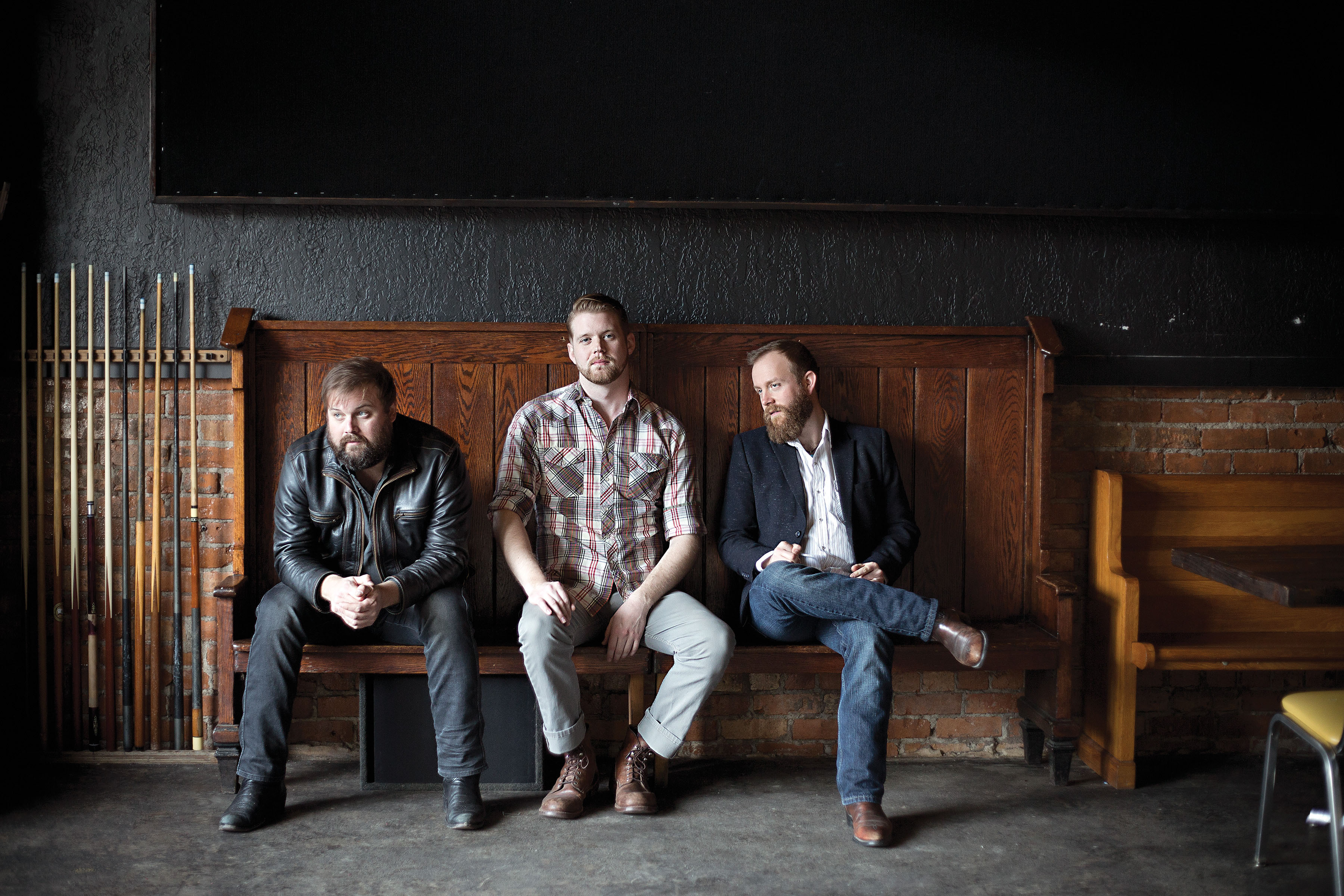

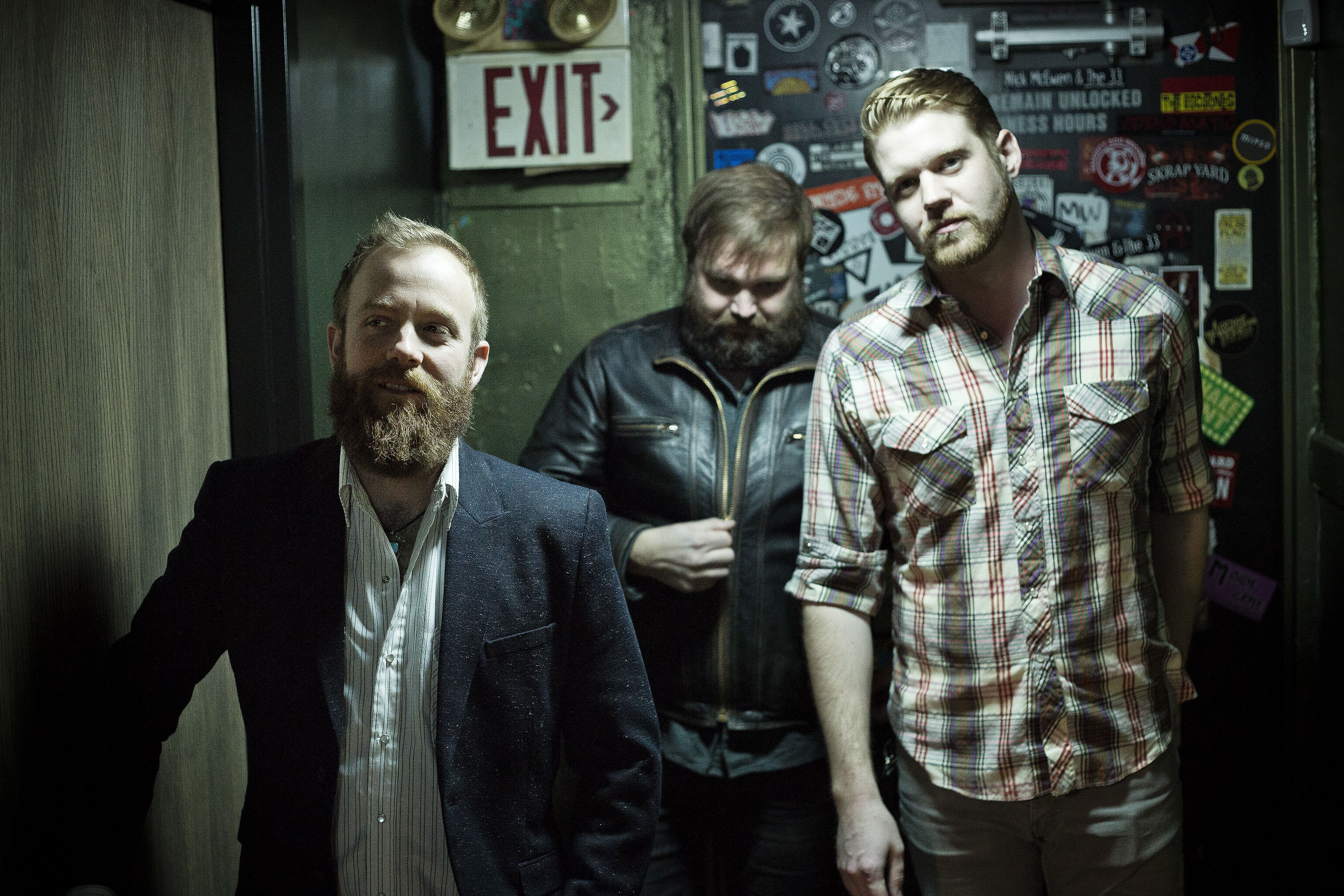

Moreland & Arbuckle (guitarist Aaron Moreland, vocalist/blues harp Dustin Arbuckle, and drummer Kendall Newby) was an American electric blues/roots rock trio. Moreland described their music as "gritty blues and roots rock from the heartland." After six previous releases, the band signed with Alligator Records in 2015. The label debut, Promised Land Or Bust, was released on May 6, 2016, and was produced by Matt Bayles. In April 2017, the band announced their break-up.

== Biography ==
Aaron Moreland was born December 16, 1974. He played in a number of garage bands while growing up and was influenced by punk, blues, and rock music. He changed course and focused on blues music after hearing "Death Letter Blues" by Son House.

Dustin Arbuckle was born December 25, 1981. He first discovered blues in his mid-teens. "Getting into blues made me want to play music," he says. He played in blues-rock bands while learning to sing with soulful authority.

The two met at an open mic session in their hometown of Wichita, Kansas in 2001 and they quickly bonded and formed an acoustic duo playing traditional and delta blues. The all acoustic duo saw their start after reaching the finals at the 2005 International Blues Competition in Memphis, Tennessee, and followed that success with their first self-produced album, Caney Valley Blues in 2005.

In 2006 the duo added a drummer and evolved into an electric powerhouse trio. Later that year they released a self-produced independent album, Floyd's Market. The trio forged a path combining rural blues, Delta, Mississippi Hill Country, and rock styles.

They followed in 2008 with 1861 (Northern Blues Music). The trio's sound continued to evolve on this recording with Moreland adding a handmade electric cigar box guitar to his arsenal. Blurt Magazine noted that "Moreland & Arbuckle put the edge back in blues-rock with their big league debut album, 1861". Moreland was further named one of the "10 Blues Legends in the Making" along with Otis Taylor and Davy Knowles. The band traveled to Iraq for nearly two weeks in the fall of 2008 to play for the American troops stationed there.

Moreland & Arbuckle released Flood in 2010 (Telarc). No Depression says, "These guys have kegs full of talent. Their songs will keep you driving fast and long." After the release of Flood, Moreland & Arbuckle hit the road supporting acts such as ZZ Top, George Thorogood, Jonny Lang, Buddy Guy, Robert Cray, Los Lonely Boys and other blues and rock veterans.

In August 2011, they released Just A Dream featuring a guest appearance by Steve Cropper. Upon its release, The New York Post named it Album of the Week, proclaiming it is "the band’s best record to date... there’s a raw, dirt-under-the fingernails garage-band attack in almost every song that flips between Stax-style soul, stinging Chicago Blues and Allman-style Jams." The band logged thousands of road miles playing high energy shows for larger and larger crowds in the United States, Canada, and Europe. European fans embraced the band's gritty American rock blues with enthusiasm.

In 2013, they released 7 Cities (Telarc). It tells the story of Spanish explorer Coronado and his fabled search for the seven cities of gold in the Kansas plains, not far from where the band lived. WNYC's Soundcheck said the band plays "gritty blues with a thoroughly contemporary bite.” American Songwriter stated the group's music is "swampy, sweaty and muggy....mixing a bluesy foundation with bits of country, folk and squawking American rock and roll.” 2013 also includes tours through the United States, Europe, and the UK.

Living Blues said of Moreland & Arbuckle, “Deeply satisfying...gritty soul and blues with garage overtones and fire-and-brimstone vocals."

Their 2016 album, Promised Land Or Bust, was nominated for a Blues Music Award in the Rock Blues Album category.

In a radio interview in 2018, Aaron Moreland explained that the breakup of the band about a year earlier was caused by his dissatisfaction with life as a touring musician. In the interview, he also talked about his new band The Moreland Contingent, which includes his son Gabe as a bass player. After the dissolution, Dustin Arbuckle formed Dustin Arbuckle and the Damnations, which included Kendall Newby on drums.

== Discography ==
=== As Moreland & Arbuckle ===
- 2016: Promised Land Or Bust (Alligator Records)
- 2013: 7 Cities (Telarc)
- 2011: Just A Dream (Telarc)
- 2010: Flood (Telarc)
- 2008: 1861 (Northern Blues Music)
- 2005: Caney Valley Blues (Moreland & Arbuckle)

=== As Moreland, Arbuckle & Floyd ===
- 2006: Floyd's Market
