= Paul James (Canadian musician) =

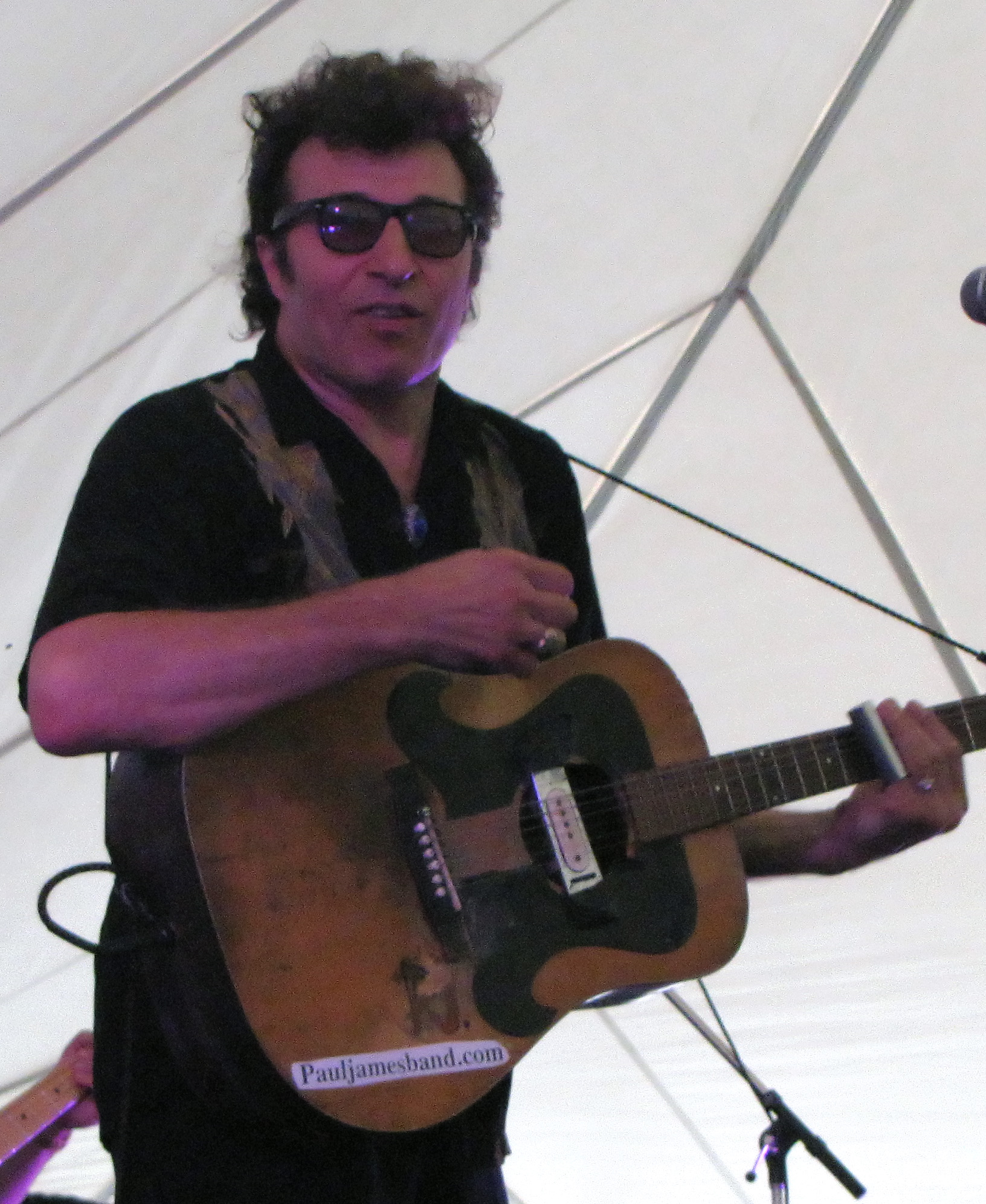
- James performing in August 2010

Background information
- Born: January 18, 1951 (age 75); Toronto, Canada
- Genres: Rockabilly, blues
- Instruments: Guitar, vocals

Paul James (born January 18, 1951) is a Canadian guitarist, vocalist and songwriter. He won the 1992 Juno Award.

== History ==
=== Early career ===
Paul James, born Paul James Vigna, grew up in the Bathurst and Bloor Street area of Toronto called Midtown. He graduated from Harbord Collegiate Institute. He began playing the guitar at the age of twelve, having first learned to play the accordion at the age of seven, through which he also learned to read music. He had taken up playing the accordion because his family could not afford a piano. James began playing professionally in the mid-1960s, while in high school. He achieved recognition as a member of a band formed with his classmates called 'Can't Explain'. The very young group of 14 year olds were asked to play a couple of songs at the Devil's Den, located below the Avenue Road Ballroom. The older crowd of Hippies gave them an ovation which gave them the courage go back to the Devils Den. This time Paul James and his drummer John Butt sat in with The Mynah Birds, (Rick James was the lead singer, Neil Young was Rhythm guitar, and Bruce Palmer was bass guitar, Neil & Bruce would later go the USA to play in the group, Buffalo Springfield), again there was great applause. Paul James and John Butt were invited by the owner of the Devils Den to come back once more, this time they sat in with The Sparrow (who would later form the band Steppenwolf). James started playing in Toronto bars full-time following his high school graduation. He answered an ad put up by Frank Mehan in the Long & McQuades Music Store, who was looking for a guitarist who could also sing R&B in his Trio Spring Fever. James was just 17yrs. old. The age limit for bars at that time was 21. After playing many different bars around Ontario, Spring Fever became the house band, for nearly two years, at the Bermuda Tavern in Toronto, playing six forty-minute sets per night, six nights a week, plus two additional sets on Saturday afternoon. While playing at the Bermuda Tavern, James would regularly visit the nearby Colonial Tavern between sets, At the time, the Colonial Tavern featured prominent blues and jazz artists, who played a full week with a matinee on Saturdays. James was particularly influenced through seeing performances by Muddy Waters, Howlin' Wolf, Buddy Guy & Jr. Wells and was even asked to sit in with Muddy's band on the Matinee. James would then go back to the Bermuda and play a Muddy Water's song that he just watched Muddy play...

=== Lick'n'Stick, Paul James and Bo Diddley ===
As of 1970, the house band at the Bermuda Tavern evolved into the band Lick'n Stick, led by James, and playing old rock and blues. During this time, James was Musical Director and composed the music for three musicals for Young People's Theatre. The first, Cyclone Jack, written by Carol Bolt about aboriginal marathon runner Tom Longboat, premiered in 1972. The other two plays to which James Musical Director and Composer were Mauriceabout Quebec Premier Maurice Dupessis (1975) and Finding Bumble (1975), both also written by Carol Bolt. All three plays were directed by Tim Bond.

A major break for James and Lick 'n' Stick was when the band was asked to open for and back up Bo Diddley at the El Mocambo, during a week long engagement in 1973. Bo Diddley was impressed with the band. He took James under his wing giving him career advice and asked James to work with him to create the soundtrack of the feature-length movie, Diary of a Sinner, Over subsequent years, Bo Diddley and Paul James played many engagements together, with Bo Diddley being considered by James as a major mentor. James was supported in his self-reliance to develop his career. James regarded the best career advice he received as coming from Bo Diddley. As James recalls, "Bo Diddley told me, 'don't sign anything'. Bo taught me not to be afraid and to be independent. When I put out my own 45s, EPs, and LPs, Bo Diddley was right there saying, 'That's what to do. Don't you be getting down on your knees to beg for a recording contract. Do it yourself!'"

Lick'n Stick obtained a record contract with Columbia Records in 1974. The label wanted the band to develop a musical style similar to that of the Bee Gees at the time, which James declined.The label released three singles by the band,1.'Take it Easy' by Paul James 2.A Rolling Stones cover of 'Under My Thumb' with Can't Do Nothing by Paul James on the flip side; and 3."Mary Ann" by Paul James(1975), Paul wrote Mary Ann and then after a visit to Jamaica changed its beat from a Latin to reggae. It may have been the first so called white reggae song released by a Canadian. It was moderately successful and was given the nod by Dick Clark, however, Lick'n'Stick's music was only available in Canada. The label did not continue with the contract thereafter as James would not play disco styled music. James had expressed reservations about the label's perspective, since at the time George Thorogood was becoming increasingly popular, performing Bo Diddley songs, and Blues rooted Rock'n'Roll. As James said, "In the States, George Thorogood was getting a shot at recording Bo Diddley, Chuck Berry, Muddy Waters, and Elmore James tunes. I was just as good as George Thorogood, so why not me? Thorogood was recording Bo Diddley songs, but I was actually playing with Bo Diddley himself!" With the Columbia Record deal gone and Disco Music flooding the airwaves Lick'n'Stick fell apart leaving all the band members seeking the haven of straight reliable jobs...except Paul James Vigna...

Lick'n Stick – founded 1970, while the house band at The Bermuda Tavern, by Paul James Vigna, guitar vocal; with Rick Law, bass; and Rob Hancock, drums...Malcom Glassford became band manager in 1971...some of the other musicians who played with Lick'n'Stick as the changing Fourth musician were; Jane Vasey, piano; Michael Picket, guitar, harp; Gary Gary, rhythm guitar, piano; Martin Soldat, piano, organ; Brian Frazer, piano

=== Paul James Band ===
Following the demise of Lick'n'Stick, Paul James Vigna became professionally known as Paul James, and founded The Paul James Band. Band members were James on lead guitar and vocals, Gary Gray on keyboards, Brian Kipping on bass and Adrian Vecchiola on drums. Band membership remained constant for decades. Gray continues to play with James. James both managed his band and started his own Independent record label, Lick'n Stick Records.

Paul James Band performed a few times at the Colonial Tavern as Mike Lyons the owner took a liking to Paul. Mike had seen James backing up Bo Diddley and asked him if he would back up Lightnin' Hopkins and then Sunnyland Slim, The Paul James Band also opened for and jammed Ramblin' Jack Elliott...The Paul James Band became a popular house band during the 1980–1984 period, playing long-term engagements at various Toronto venues, The Red Lion, The Hotel California, The Upper Lip, and The Isabella Hotel.

In 1982, Willy DeVille met Paul James while performing in Toronto, and invited James to join him and his band Mink DeVille on a World Tour of twelve counties in Europe with a kick off engagement at 'Tracks' in New York City. James agreed, making arrangements that his band could continue as the house band of, The Upper Lip, a Toronto night club, in his absence. James, stayed with Toot's & Willy DeVille at their apartment on 5th Avenue in NYC while he learned the material for the Mink DeVille Tour and also joined the Band in recording 'Stand By Me', at the Power Station in NYC all while taking in Grenwitch with his hosts Toots & Willy DeVille. Paul guitar played for Mink DeVille for two months in large concert halls and festivals all over Europe, including an appearance at the 1982 Montreux Jazz Festival, which gave birth to a DVD released on Eagle Rock TV titled" Mink DeVille Live at Montreux 1982'. There were three sold out nights at the Olympia, in Paris,(where Édith Piaf used to perform), the Dominion Theatre in London, Pink Pop Festival in the Netherlands, double festivals in Belgium, Finland, Sweden, Norway, Monaco, all over France and Germany, Paul also played with DeVille at an outdoor festival in Milan, Italy, before an estimated audience of 70,000 people after Italy had won the World Cup in Soccer. During the tour, on the bus and in Hotel rooms Paul composed the songs for what would become Almost Crazy, James' first album.(later released as a CD called Lazy Crazy Blues)

James released Almost Crazy in 1984, after issuing a series of singles, the profits from which were used to self-finance the release of the album.

In 1986, James met Bob Dylan at one of James' Toronto club performances. Dylan decided to play with James that night, and backed James for two hours, without being identified, instead being introduced by James as "some hitchhiker from Vancouver". The two maintained a friendship over the years with Paul James being invited to open for Bob Dylan at Canada's Wonderland in 1989, then a couple years later Dylan called Paul up on stage from out of the audience to sit in with him. James joined Dylan in 1999 at the Midland Arena in Buffalo, New York. Dylan invited James to sit in at Air Canada Centre in Toronto, in 2001. James almost joined Dylan's touring band after sitting a couple more times in London, Ontario, and Oshawa in 2008...

James was also influenced by John Hammond, who befriended James after James backed Hammond at a Toronto performance. It was Hammond who encouraged James to explore acoustic blues.

In 1991, James "Hey Rosita" was included in Saturday Night Blues, a compilation album which won the 1992 Juno Award for Best Roots and Traditional Album.

In 2012, James was awarded the 2011 Maple Blues Blues With A Feeling Lifetime Achievement Award.

== Discography ==
=== Paul James Band ===
==== Albums ====
- 2007 Lost in the Blues (Lick'n Stick)
- 2003 La Vie en Bleu (Lick'n Stick)
- 1998 Lazy Crazy Blues (Lick'n Stick) (re-release of Almost Crazy)
- 1989 Rockin' The Blues (Stony Plain)
- 1987 Paul James Band (OPM)
- 1984 Almost Crazy (Lick'n Stick)

==== Singles ====
- 1989 Anna Banana/Jailhouse Rock (Stony Plain) SP-1069
- 1986 Route 66/Run Run Rudolph (Lick'n Stick) C-626
- 1986 Good Old Rock 'N' Roll/Joint Out Back (Lick'n Stick) C-595
- 1985 Six Pack (Lick'n Stick) C-580
- 1982 Suzette/Maryann (Lick'n Stick) C-350
- 1980 Lazy Crazy Blues/Trespasser//She Don't Care/Got What You Want (Lick'n Stick) C-311

=== Paul James ===
- 2000 Paul's Acoustic Blues (Lick 'n' Stick) (re-release of Acoustic Blues)
- 1989 Acoustic Blues (Stony Plain)

=== Lick'n Stick ===
Singles

- 1975 Mary Ann/Come And Get My Love (Columbia) C4-4134
- 1975 Under My Thumb/You Can't Do Nothing For Me (Columbia) C4-4118
- 1975 Gravity Of Sin/Take It Easy (Columbia) C4-4070

=== Compilation inclusions ===
- 1996 A Celebration of the Blues: Great Slide Guitar (St. Clair)
- 1991 Saturday Night Blues (Stony Plain)
