= White African (album) =

Studio album by Otis Taylor
- Released: 2001
- Recorded: 2000
- Genre: Blues
- Label: NorthernBlues
- Producer: Kenny Passarelli

Otis Taylor chronology
When Negroes Walked the Earth (1997)	White African (2001)	Respect the Dead (2002)

White African is an album by the American musician Otis Taylor, released in 2001. The album won Taylor a W. C. Handy Award for best new blues artist.

== Production ==
Recorded in 2000, the album was produced by Kenny Passarelli, who also played bass. Taylor's daughter Cassie sang on the album. The album booklet contains mugshots of Black men arrested for vagrancy in Kansas in the early part of the 20th century. Taylor played a 1949 Gibson L-50 guitar.

"Saint Martha Blues" references the lynching of Taylor's great-grandfather. "Lost My Horse" is about alcoholism. "3 Days and 3 Nights" deals with the consequences of a lack of affordable medical care.

== Critical reception ==
Professional ratings
Review scores
Source	Rating
AllMusic	4.5/5 stars
Calgary Herald	3.5/4 stars
Robert Christgau	(3-star Honorable Mention)
The Encyclopedia of Popular Music	4/5 stars
The Gazette	4.5/5 stars
Ottawa Citizen	4/5 stars
The Penguin Guide to Blues Recordings	2.5/4 stars

Robert Christgau praised "My Soul's in Louisiana" and "Saint Martha Blues". The Gazette wrote that Taylor "draws you into the songs with riveting, trance-like rhythms that lend powerful support to his passionate, often angry, vocals." The Commercial Appeal noted that the album "ties [John Lee] Hooker's guitar style to socially and politically charged lyrics."

The Globe and Mail stated that "the album's minimalist trance-blues are delivered with a sparse elegance through Taylor's gruff vocals and acoustic guitar, banjo and mandolin." The Calgary Herald deemed White African "a stunning display of traditional blues in a sparse and timeless context." The Philadelphia Inquirer called Taylor "a contemporary artist who captures the stark immediacy of traditional blues while sounding like no one else."

AllMusic wrote: "Greatly influenced by John Lee Hooker, the very soulful Taylor often favors moody, dusky, haunting grooves."

== Track listing ==
No.	Title	Length
1.	"My Soul's in Louisiana"
2.	"Resurrection Blues"
3.	"Momma Don't You Do It"
4.	"3 Days and 3 Nights"
5.	"Round and Round"
6.	"Stick on You"
7.	"Rain So Hard"
8.	"Lost My Horse"
9.	"Saint Martha Blues"
10.	"Ain't No Cowgirl"
11.	"Hungry People"
