= Jack Semple =

Canadian singer and guitarist

- Origin: Regina, Saskatchewan, Canada
- Genre: Blues
- Occupation: Musician
- Instrument: Guitar
- Website: www.jacksemple.com

Jack Semple is a Canadian blues singer and guitarist from Regina, Saskatchewan. Semple was the lead guitarist for The Lincolns for two years; he performs as a solo artist and with The Jack Semple Band, throughout Canada and in the United States.

== Early life ==
Semple grew up on a farm north of Regina, Saskatchewan. He learned to play guitar, and earned money as a teenager giving guitar lessons.

== Career ==
Semple started his musical career playing with various Regina-based bands. He moved to Toronto in the late 1980s to become the lead guitarist of The Lincolns, a funk and rhythm and blues band. He left the band after about two years and returned to Regina to pursue a solo career and to spend more time with his family.

After his move back to Regina, Semple contributed to television and music scores and appeared in the title role of Guitarman, a 1994 television movie. Semple also commenced a solo recording career that has resulted in the release of eight albums. In 1992, Semple won the Canada-wide MuchMusic "Guitar Wars" contest.

Semple was twice nominated, in 1999 and 2000, for a Gemini Award for his soundtrack work on the television series Incredible Story Studio.

In 2016 Semple was presented with an honorary Doctor of Fine Arts degree by the University of Regina. That year he performed as part of the group True Jazz Pluckers, in concert with the Regina Symphony Orchestra.

Semple continues to perform with The Jack Semple Band, including a concert at the Park Theatre in Winnipeg in 2017.

== Discography ==
=== Solo/Jack Semple Band ===
- 1991 Live from Formerly's
- 1994 Sneakin' Suspicion
- 1995 Grey and Yellow
- 1997 Saskadelphia
- 2001 Live at Kaos
- 2004 Qu'appelle
- 2006 Cool Yule
- 2006 Tribute to Lightfoot
- 2012 In The Blue Light
- 2017 Live at Mount Baker Rhythm and Blues Festival

=== Compilation Inclusions ===
- 1991 Saturday Night Blues (CBC)
- 2006 Saturday Night Blues: 20 Years (CBC)
