= The Twisters (Canadian band) =

Canadian musical group

- Origin: North Vancouver, British Columbia, Canada
- Genres: Blues
- Instruments: Harmonica, Guitar, Bass, Drum
- Years active: 1994–2014
- Labels: NorthernBlues Music, Full Swing Music, Festival Distribution
- Members: David Hoerl; Sandy Smith; Pete Turland; Greg "Junior" Demchuk; Brandon Isaak; James "JT" Taylor (d. 2005); Matt Pease; Chip Hart; Keith Picot
- Website: twisters.ca

The Twisters were a blues band from North Vancouver, British Columbia. They are signed to Toronto's NorthernBlues Music.

== History ==
The Twisters was formed by harmonica player David "Hurricane" Hoerl and drummer Sandy Smith (a.k.a. "Sandy Bone") in 1994, and included Pete Turland on bass and Greg "Junior" Demchuk on guitar, both as recommended by Smith. Smith had previously co-founded the Back Alley John Revue in Ottawa, and later joined Back Alley John in Calgary, where the two continued to play and record. Smith had known Demchuk from Smith's time playing in Calgary, and persuaded Demchuk to move to Vancouver to join the band. Brandon Isaak joined the band on guitar in 1999, while James "JT" Taylor joined the band on bass in 2001.

In 2003 The Twisters released an album Long Hard Road. They were nominated for a 2003 Juno Award, and winner of 'Best Blues Album of the Year' at the Canadian Independent Music Awards for this album.

In 2004, tendonitis forced Smith had to leave the band; he was replaced by Matt Pease. In 2005, the band was in a car accident, in which Taylor was killed and Pease seriously injured. Chip Hart and Keith Picot later joined the band on drums and bass, respectively. The band released an album, After the Storm, in 2006.

Their album Come Out Swingin' was nominated for 'Blues Album Of The Year' by The Western Canadian Music Awards in 2009, and was nominated for five Maple Blues Awards the same year. These included Best Recording of the year, Song Writer Of The Year, Electric Act Of The Year, Bass Player Of The Year and Harmonica Player Of The Year.

Come Out Swingin', which was composed mainly of original tunes, was praised by the Barrelhouse Blues enews in Boston for its arrangements, vocal harmonies and instrumental performances. and included as special guest former band member and Juno Award winner Kenny "Blues Boss" Wayne on piano.

In 2011, the band played the Ottawa Bluesfest.

In mid-2014, shortly before the release of his first solo album, Un-Twisted, David Hoerl suffered a stroke. As of February 2020, he has not returned to music. The remaining members have all moved on to other bands.

== Discography ==
- Fulla Hot Air, 1999, Full Swing Records
- Long Hard Road, 2002, Full Swing Records
- Live at Harvest Fest, 2003, Festival Distribution
- After The Storm, 2006, Northern Blues
- Come Out Swingin': The Masters of Hot Jump, 2009, Northern Blues
