= Eddie Turner =

American singer-songwriter

- Also known as: Eddie "Devil Boy" Turner
- Born: Cuba
- Genre: Blues
- Instrument: Guitar
- Label: NorthernBlues Music

Eddie "Devil Boy" Turner is a blues guitarist born in Cuba and raised in Chicago. A former member of the Otis Taylor band, he is currently signed to Toronto's NorthernBlues Music.

Turner began to play the guitar when he was twelve. He attended the University of Colorado Boulder in the early-1970s, and while there played in the region's first punk/R&B band The Immortal Nightflames, then later toured with Grammy Award nominee Tracy Nelson from Mother Earth for a short time

Subsequently, Turner joined the Legendary 4-Nikators (an oldies band formed by members of Zephyr and Flash Cadillac), then when David and Candy Givens reformed Zephyr Eddie was tapped to be lead guitarist and appears on the 1982 HEARTBEAT lp. After the death of the singer Candy Givens he abandoned music to work in real-estate in Denver.

In the mid 1990's Turner joined the Ron Miles electric band appearing on the 1996 cd My Cruel Heart. In 1995, he joined Kenny Passarelli and Otis Taylor, recording five albums.

In 2006 he was listed among the Best New Artist Debut by the Blues Foundation.

Turner now performs solo as a singer/songwriter. He was the winner of the 6th annual Independent Music Awards Vox Pop vote for best Blues Album The Turner Diaries. His song "Mr. Blues" was nominated for the 8th annual Independent Music Awards for Blues Song of the Year. In January 2011, his song "Miracles and Demons" was nominated for the 10th Annual Independent Music Awards.

== Discography ==
- 2005 Rise
- 2006 The Turner Diaries
- 2010 Miracles & Demons
