= Spend Some Time with Me =

Studio album by Mem Shannon
- Released: 1999
- Genres: Blues, funk, soul
- Label: Shanachie
- Producers: Dennis Walker, Mem Shannon

Mem Shannon chronology
Mem Shannon's 2nd Blues Album (1997)	Spend Some Time with Me (1999)	Memphis in the Morning (2001)

Spend Some Time with Me is an album by the American musician Mem Shannon, released in 1999. It was his first album for Shanachie Records. Shannon supported the album with a North American tour.

== Production ==
The album was produced by Dennis Walker and Shannon; it was mixed by John Hampton. Shannon was backed by his band, the Membership. He decided to explore other styles of music, including funk, in an effort to avoid being labeled strictly a blues musician. "The Last Time I Was Here (Millennium Blues)" is about slavery and Black reincarnation. "Born in This Time" is a cover of the Muddy Waters song. "Paying My Dues" is about the problems encountered by musicians on the lower rungs of the music business. "Pray for the Children" addresses adolescent violence. "Who Are They" casts a skeptical eye at media pundits.

== Critical reception ==
Professional ratings
Review scores
Source	Rating
AllMusic	4/5 stars
DownBeat	3.5/5 stars
Orlando Sentinel	3.5/5 stars
The Penguin Guide to Blues Recordings	3/4 stars
USA Today	3/4 stars

OffBeat wrote that Shannon's "solos are jazzy, stream-of-consciousness explorations that can quote a Latin figure one minute and head into lyrical George Benson territory the next... But most of all, Shannon is funky." USA Today said that "Shannon further expands the definition of blues by carving funk grooves, jazzy flourishes and even country ... into 11 originals stamped by his usual sassy lead guitar and crack rhythm section." The Daily Herald determined that, "more a rich soul album bedded with horns that lead the songs rather than react to them, Spend Some Time with Me is utterly unique for its humor and structure."

The Orlando Sentinel concluded: "Shannon has a real knack for melody—something often wanting in both blues and R&B nowadays. Even more rare is his attention to lyrics. Shannon's songs always tell a story and are often humorous and pointed." The Star Tribune stated that "his gruff baritone stylishly tackles tear-stained blues, snappy funk and countrified ballads; his pointed guitar work ranges from funky-chicken chording to terse, fiery solos and fluid jazz passages." The Washington Post opined that Shannon fashions "a clever blend of Snooks Eaglin's Louisiana blues and Bill Withers's soul-music monologues."

AllMusic wrote that "Shannon finds new ways to define and transcend the blues."

== Track listing ==
No.	Title	Length
1.	"Who Are They"
2.	"Paying My Dues"
3.	"Not My Friend"
4.	"Don't Talk About My Mama"
5.	"The Last Time I Was Here (Millennium Blues)"
6.	"Pray for the Children"
7.	"Dirty Dishes"
8.	"A Certain Shade of Blue"
9.	"Spend Some Time with Me"
10.	"Mother's Love"
11.	"Born in This Time"
12.	"No Such Thing (My Humble Opinion: 2nd Movement)"
