= Drew Nelson (musician) =

Canadian musician

- Drew Nelson (right) and Back Alley John, Byward Market, Ottawa, 1983

Background information
- Origin: Ottawa, Ontario, Canada
- Genres: Blues
- Occupations: Blues singer, songwriter, guitarist
- Instrument: Guitar
- Years active: 1976–present

Drew Nelson is a Canadian blues singer, songwriter, guitarist and recording artist. Nelson is particularly known for his slide guitar playing. He has been playing professionally for nearly fifty years.

== History ==
There's something unique about Drew that I wanted to remind people of: Drew has always approached his music with honesty. He’s very unpretentious, and that can’t be said of a lot of musicians. Someone can learn to play a style of music, and they can play all the notes and play them really well, and somehow, sometimes you don’t believe them. I believe Drew.

Steve Marriner, producer of Drew Nelson's 2014 album, The Other Side

Drew Nelson has based his music career primarily in Ottawa, Ontario. His professional career commenced in the 1970s, particularly as a result of his association with the late blues singer and harmonica player Back Alley John (d. 2006), where Nelson was the lead guitarist in and co-founder of the Back Alley John Revue. Both Nelson and John were instrumental in developing the career of Sue Foley, whose professional career commenced as a sixteen-year-old singer in the Back Alley John Revue.

Drew Nelson in 2009 at Irene's Pub in Ottawa

The Back Alley John Revue, formed in 1980, initially played in Ottawa clubs and busked on the streets of Ottawa during the early 1980s, particularly in Ottawa's Byward Market, playing blues for passersby in front of the historic Chateau Lafayette House tavern.

Nelson's solo career commenced when the Back Alley John Revue broke up in 1986, followed by the relocation of John to Calgary, Alberta.

Nelson achieved early success as a solo artist when "Nothing to Show", an award-winning song originally recorded with the Back Alley John Revue and later recorded by the Drew Nelson Band, was selected for inclusion in the 1991 Saturday Night Blues compilation album of Canadian blues music. The album won the 1992 Juno Award for Best Roots and Traditional Album of the Year.

During this period, Nelson and his band played and recorded with Canadian blues artist Dutch Mason. Four songs written by Nelson appeared on Mason's 1992 album, You Can't Have Everything, which Nelson also produced. The album was nominated for a 1994 Juno Award for Best Blues or Gospel Album. Over several years, Nelson and his band either opened or acted as the backing band for such artists as B.B. King, Bo Diddley, Buddy Guy, Junior Wells, Stevie Ray Vaughan, Little Richard, Eric Burdon and Taj Mahal.

After a period of self-imposed semi-retirement, Nelson released Thirty Odd Years in 2006. A reconfigured band returned to performing in 2009. though Nelson and band performed with decreasing frequency thereafter. In 2014, Nelson released The Other Side, produced by Steve Marriner of MonkeyJunk. Marriner was an admirer of Nelson, who encouraged Nelson to return to recording and who also co-wrote a number of the songs on the CD.

== Discography ==
=== The Drew Nelson Band ===
- 2014 The Other Side (Capon)
- 2006 30 Odd Years (Capon)
- 2001 Just Because (Capon)
- 1994 Mr. Nelson's Neighbourhood (Capon)
- 1990 The Honeymoon's Over (Capon)
- 1989 The Drew Nelson Band (Capon)

=== Compilation Inclusions; Contributions to Others ===
- 2006 Saturday Night Blues: 20 Years (CBC)
- 2001 25 Years of Stony Plain (Stony Plain)
- 1997 Absolute Blues, Vol. 2 (Stony Plain)
- 1996 20 Years of Stony Plain (Stony Plain)
- 1992 Dutch Mason, You Can't Have Everything (Stony Plain)
- 1992 Saturday Night Blues (Stony Plain/CBC)
- 1983 Share CHEZ 83
