= Mem Shannon =

American blues musician (born 1959)

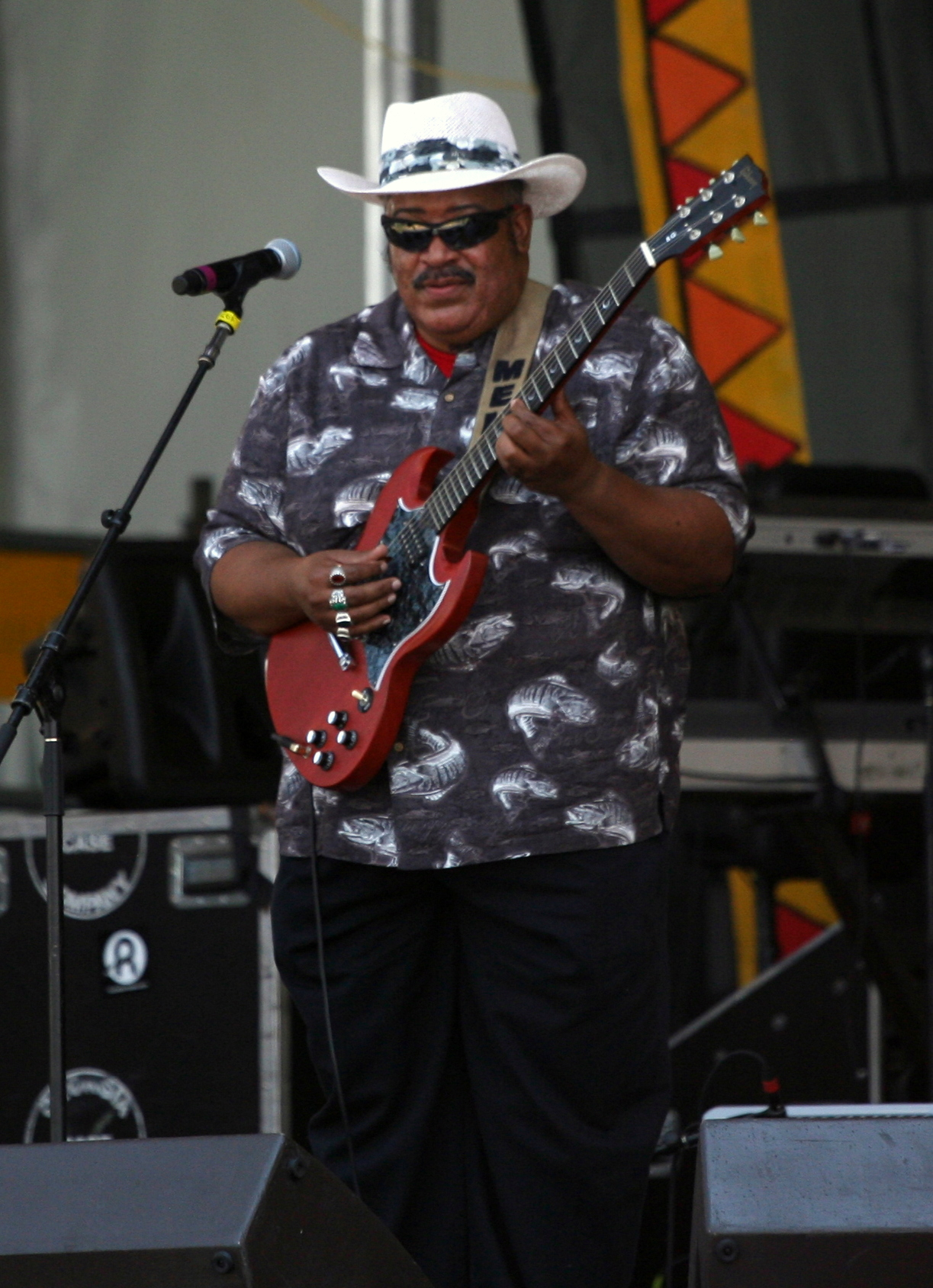
- Mem Shannon in 2012

Background information
- Born: December 21, 1959 (age 66); New Orleans, Louisiana, United States
- Genres: Blues
- Label: NorthernBlues Music

Mem Shannon (born December 21, 1959, in New Orleans, Louisiana, United States) is an American blues musician. He is currently signed to Toronto's NorthernBlues Music. Shannon is a former taxi-cab driver turned bluesman.

== Early life ==
Shannon played both clarinet and guitar by the age of fifteen, due to being inspired by his father's collection of blues records. However, he started seriously practicing only after seeing B.B. King.

== Career ==
=== Beginnings ===
After playing in local bands for several years and enjoying local success, his father died in 1981 and he took a job driving a cab in order to help his family pay bills. His music career was put on hold until 1990, when he began playing in local clubs at the urging of a former bassist.

In the early 1990s, he formed a group called Mem Shannon and the Membership, who won a spot playing at the 1991 New Orleans Jazz & Heritage Festival. Later in 1991, they competed for a spot at the Long Beach Blues Festival, but lost in the final round of the talent contest and did not get to appear.

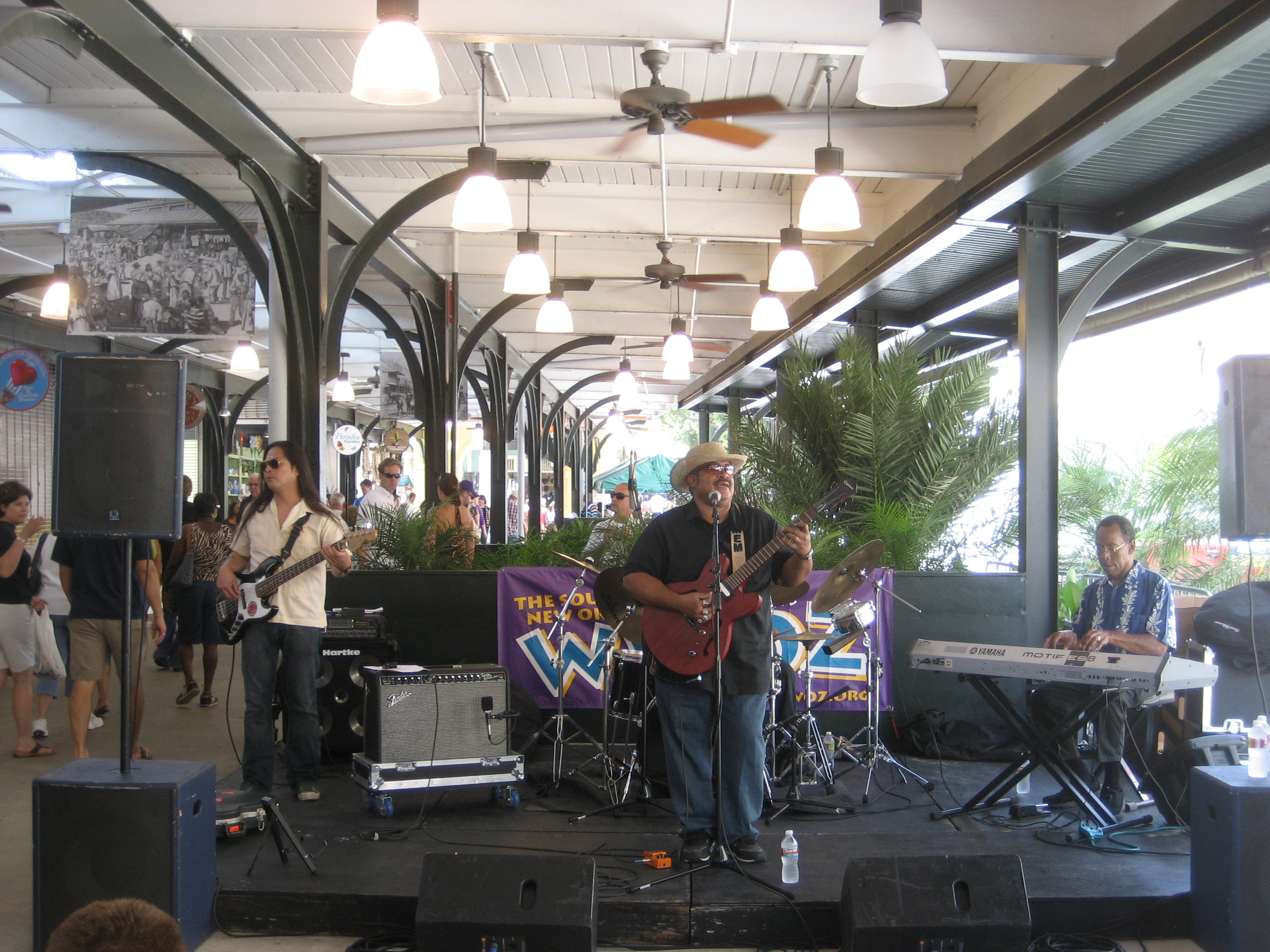
Mem Shannon and the Membership playing a WWOZ event in the French Market, New Orleans, 2009

=== First album and beyond ===
In 1995, after being impressed with a demo tape that Shannon had recorded, Joe Boyd of Hannibal Records contacted Shannon, and his first album, A Cab Driver's Blues, was released on October 15, 1995. Songs on the album featured snippets of actual conversations from his customers while in the cab. In April 1996, Shannon announced that he was giving up driving his cab in order to make playing music his full-time job.

His song "S.U.V." (2002), won Living Blues magazine's Critics Poll Song of the Year, as well as receiving a Blues Music Award nomination for song of the year.

Shannon appeared as himself in the 2008 novel, Bad Moon Rising by Jonathan Maberry. He is one of several real-world celebrities who are in the fictional town of Pine Deep when monsters attack. Other celebrities included Tom Savini, Jim O'Rear, Brinke Stevens, Ken Foree, Stephen Susco, Debbie Rochon, James Gunn and Joe Bob Briggs. Shannon's name and persona appear coincidentally in two horror novels: Fat White Vampire Blues by Andrew Fox and the aforementioned Bad Moon Rising.

== Discography ==
- A Cab Driver's Blues (1995)
- 2nd Blues Album (1997)
- Spend Some Time with Me (1999)
- Memphis in the Morning (2001)
- I'm From Phunkville (2005)
- Live: A Night at Tipitina's (2007)
