= Brandon Isaak =

Canadian musician

Brandon Isaak is a Canadian blues singer and guitarist based in Vancouver Island, British Columbia. He is most noted for his 2023 album One Step Closer, which was a Juno Award nominee for Blues Album of the Year at the Juno Awards of 2024.

Originally from Whitehorse, Yukon, he is the son of country musician Ed Isaak. He moved to Vancouver, British Columbia, in 1999, where he was a member of the blues band The Twisters until their breakup.

== Discography ==
- Bluesman's Plea - 2011
- Here on Earth - 2014
- Big City Back Country Blues - 2017
- Rise 'n Shine - 2018
- Modern Primitive - 2021
- One Step Closer - 2023
- Walkin' With the Blues - 2025
