= Sugarbird (album) =

Studio album by Paul Reddick
- Released: 14 October 2008
- Genre: Blues
- Length: 46:05
- Label: NorthernBlues Music
- Producer: Colin Linden

Paul Reddick chronology
| Villanelle (2004) | Sugarbird (2008) | WishBone (2012) |

Professional ratings
Review scores
| Source | Rating |
|---|---|
| Allmusic | 4/5 stars |
| StLBlues | 5/5 stars |

Sugarbird is Paul Reddick's second solo album. Reddick previously recorded four albums with The Sidemen, a blues band based out of Toronto.

== Track listing ==
All tracks are written by Paul Reddick and Colin Linden, unless otherwise noted

| No. | Title | Writer(s) | Length |
|---|---|---|---|
| 1. | "Morning Bell" | | 3:36 |
| 2. | "I Will Vanish" | | 4:09 |
| 3. | "Devilment" | | 2:43 |
| 4. | "Blue Wings" | Reddick; Linden; Kate Schutt | 3:45 |
| 5. | "John Lennon In New Orleans" | Linden | 3:52 |
| 6. | "It's Later Than You Think" | Linden | 3:46 |
| 7. | "Breathless Girls" | | 2:29 |
| 8. | "Wishing Song" | | 3:55 |
| 9. | "Every Temptation" | | 3:55 |
| 10. | "Climbing Up The Hill" | | 4:55 |
| 11. | "If By This" | | 5:33 |
| 12. | "Block Of Wood" | | 3:27 |
| Total length: | | | 46:05 |

== Musicians ==
=== Tracks 5, 6 & 7 ===
- Paul Reddick: Vocal, Harmonica
- Colin Linden: Guitars
- John Whynot: Piano
- Hutch Hutchinson: Bass
- Stephen Hodges: Drums, Percussion, Tubular Bells
- Darrell Leonard: Trumpet/Horn Arrangements
- Joe Sublette: Saxophone
- Jim McMillen: Saxophone
- Jim Thompson: Trombone

=== Tracks 3, 4 & 12 ===
- Paul Reddick: Vocal, Harmonica
- Colin Linden: Guitars, Banjo, Electric Bass, Baritone Guitar
- Bryan Owings: Drums
- Dave Roe: Upright Bass (Tracks 3 & 12)
- Chris Carmichael: Strings (Track 4)

=== Tracks 1, 8 & 10 ===
- Paul Reddick: Vocal, Harmonica
- Colin Linden: 12-String Guitar, National Steel Guitar
- Garth Hudson: Accordion

=== Tracks 2, 9 & 11 ===
- Paul Reddick: Vocal, Harmonica
- Colin Linden: Guitars, Harmonies
- John Dymond: Bass
- Gary Craig: Drums
- Chris Carmichael: Strings (Track 11)
- Bryan Owings: Drums (Track 2)

== Production ==
- Produced by Colin Linden
- Recorded by Colin Linden, John Whynot, George Seara, Justin Puig and Chris Carmichael at Pinhead Recorders (Toronta and Nashville), Phase One Studios (Toronto), Levon Helm Studio (Woodstock, NY), Sound City Studio (Los Angeles)
- Mixed by Colin Linden at Pinhead Recorders (Toronto)
- Mastered by John Whynot
- Illustration: Mango Hummingbird, Audubon Centennial Edition, Audubon Arts, West Palm Beach, FL
- Photography: Koko Bonaparte, Alan Messer, iStock
- Design: Compass360 Design & Advertising

All track information and credits were taken from the CD liner notes.
