= Saturday Night Blues =

- Genre: Blues
- Country of origin: Canada
- Home station: CBC Radio One (1987–2021); CBC Music (2009–present)
- Hosted by: Holger Petersen
- Recording studio: Edmonton, Alberta
- Original release: December 12, 1987 – present

Saturday Night Blues is a Canadian radio program, which airs Saturday nights on CBC Music. Hosted by Holger Petersen, the program airs a mix of blues concerts, recordings and interviews with blues musicians.

== Broadcast history ==
SNB first broadcast on CBC Radio One in 1987. Initially airing for one hour weekly, the program was expanded to two hours in 1990.

In 2009, a second airing of the program was added to the schedule of CBC Radio 2, the CBC's music network (now CBC Music).

== Host and legacy ==
In 2021, it was announced that the program would be taken off the CBC Radio One broadcast schedule with its final broadcast on that network on September 4, but it would still air on CBC Music on its regular schedule.

Petersen, the program's host, is the owner of Canadian roots music label Stony Plain Records. A compilation album of live performances from the show, Saturday Night Blues: The Great Canadian Blues Project, Vol. 1, was released in 1991 and won the 1992 Juno Award for Best Roots and Traditional Album of the Year. Peterson has also published two books of his musician interviews from Saturday Night Blues and his other radio show, CKUA Radio's Natch'l Blues.

For his work on Saturday Night Blues and on CKUA Radio's Natch'l Blues, in 2008 Petersen won the 'Keeping the Blues Alive' award from the Blues Foundation.

== Great Canadian Blues Award ==
In the 1990s and 2000s, the program presented an annual Great Canadian Blues Award to the year's best Canadian blues musician. Winners of the award have included the Downchild Blues Band, Jim Byrnes, David Gogo, Colin Linden, Rita Chiarelli, David Wilcox, Colin James, Long John Baldry, Big Dave McLean (1998), Matt Minglewood, Sue Foley, Georgette Fry, Harry Manx and Jeff Healey.
