= Holger Petersen (Canadian businessman) =

Canadian record producer (born 1949)

Holger Petersen CM AOE
- Born: 23 November 1949 (age 76); Pellworm, West Germany
- Occupations: Businessman, record producer, radio broadcaster and author
- Known for: A founder of the Edmonton Folk Music Festival and Canadian "Ambassador of the Blues"

Holger Petersen, CM AOE (born 23 November 1949) is a Canadian businessman, record producer and radio broadcaster. He founded the independent roots music record label Stony Plain Records in 1975 with partner Alvin Jahns. The label was sold to True North/Linus Music in 2018, but Petersen continues to act as executive producer on many recording projects. He was born in Pellworm Island, West Germany.

Petersen has hosted Saturday Night Blues since 1987, heard on CBC Radio (at various times on CBC Radio One, CBC Radio Two, CBC Music, CBC Listen and SiriusXM 169) and Natch'l Blues since 1969, the longest running blues program in Canada, on the CKUA Radio Network. Petersen was a founder of the Edmonton Folk Music Festival and served as the artistic director from 1986 to 1988. He has served on boards of numerous industry organizations, including SOCAN, CMRRA, CARAS and CIRPA and helped found the Alberta Recording Industries Association (now Alberta Music).

His first book, Talking Music: Blues Radio and Roots Music, was published in 2011 by Insomniac Press. His second book, Talking Music 2: Blues and Roots Music Mavericks, was released in January 2017.

He has also been a drummer and was a member of Spiny Norman's Whoopee Band and Hot Cottage.

Petersen was inducted as a Member into the Order of Canada in 2003 for contributions to Canadian culture, and has received honorary doctorates from both the University of Alberta and Athabasca University, as well as an honorary bachelor of technology from the Northern Alberta Institute of Technology (NAIT), the post-secondary institute from which he graduated in 1970. He was appointed as a Member to the Alberta Order of Excellence in 2020.

Petersen has contributed to more than 200 music projects since 1970.

Petersen is based in Edmonton, Alberta.

== Awards ==
Maple Blues Award - Blues With A Feeling Lifetime Achievement	1987
Canadian Country Music Association - Record Company Person of the Year	1989
Edmonton Cultural Hall of Fame	1992
Maple Blues Award - Media Person of the Year	1997
Prairie Music Association - Outstanding Producer	1999
Alberta Recording Industries Association - Record Producer of the Year	1999
Canadian Country Music Association - Record Company Person of the Year	2001
American Foundation for Independent Music - Record Producer	2002
Queen's Golden Jubilee Medal	2002
Member of the Order of Canada	2003
Honorary Doctor of Letters. Athabasca University	2004
Alberta Centennial Medal	2005
Blues Foundation - Keeping The Blues Alive	2008
Calgary Blues Music Association - Lifetime Achievement Award	2010
Canadian Blues Museum Hall of Fame Induction	2011
NAIT Top 50 Alumni Award	2012
Honorary Doctor of Letters, University of Alberta	2012
Western Canadian Music Award - Industry Builder Award	2013
Edmonton Blues Hall of Fame - Builder	2014
Mel Brown Blues Award - Lifetime Achievement	2018
Folk Alliance International - Folk DJ Hall of Fame	2020
Alberta Order of Excellence	2020
Queen's Platinum Jubilee Medal	2022
Honorary Bachelor of Technology in Management, Northern Alberta Institute of Technology (NAIT)	2025
