= Saturday Night Blues (album) =

Saturday Night Blues: The Great Canadian Blues Project, Volume 1

Studio album by Various artists
- Released: 1991
- Genre: blues music
- Label: Stony Plain Records

Various artists chronology
Saturday Night Blues: The Great Canadian Blues Project, Volume 1 (1991)	Saturday Night Blues: 20 Years (2006)

Saturday Night Blues is a compilation album of recordings by Canadian blues performers, released by Stony Plain Records and the Canadian Broadcasting Corporation in 1991. Subtitled "The Great Canadian Blues Project, Volume 1", the album was released as a tie-in to the CBC Radio program Saturday Night Blues, and was compiled from a mix of previously released material, new unreleased recordings and performance tapes from the CBC Radio archives. It was one of the first significant compilations of the work of Canadian blues artists.

The album was a cowinner, with Loreena McKennitt's The Visit, of the 1992 Juno Award for Best Roots and Traditional Album.

A sequel album, Saturday Night Blues: 20 Years, was issued in 2006.

== Critical response ==
Mark Miller of The Globe and Mail gave the album a mixed review, calling some of the songs excellent but criticizing the album for including only one woman and only one artist from the vibrant blues scene in Quebec. Helen Metella of the Edmonton Journal reviewed the album positively, writing that "these 20 cuts acknowledge the tremendous variety and top drawer quality of northern blues."

== Track listing ==
No.	Title	Music	Length
1.	"Danser le loup"	Gerald Laroche	3:01
2.	"No More Doggin'"	Colin James	4:16
3.	"Path to the Liquor Store"	Jackson Delta	3:36
4.	"I Need a Woman"	Johnny V and The Houserockers	3:32
5.	"Just Your Fool"	Dutch Mason	3:44
6.	"Thinking About You"	Lester Quitzau	4:07
7.	"Bert's Boogie"	Amos Garrett	3:05
8.	"Bad Luck Blues"	Ken Hamm	3:35
9.	"Love U 2 Much"	Rita Chiarelli and the Road Rockets	4:19
10.	"Pussy Footin'"	Dean Cottrill	2:50
11.	"Rockin' Little Boogie"	Downchild Blues Band	3:47
12.	"Goin' Down South"	Bill Bourne	3:02
13.	"Statellite Dish"	Brent Sam Parkin and the Stingers	3:32
14.	"Nothing to Show"	The Drew Nelson Band	4:19
15.	"T.V. Preacher Blues"	Big Dave McLean and the Muddy-Tones	3:15
16.	"Love of a Woman"	Jack Semple and the Luxury Blues Band	3:52
17.	"Hey Rosita"	Paul James	3:53
18.	"Tombstone Boogie"	David Raven	3:48
19.	"The Drifter"	Roger Howse	3:20
20.	"Clear But Confusing"	Rusty Reed and the Southside Shuffle	2:02
