= NorthernBlues Music =

Canadian independent record label,

- Founded: 2001
- Founder: Fred Litwin
- Genre: Blues
- Country of origin: Canada
- Location: Toronto, Ontario
- Official website: NorthernBlues Music official website

NorthernBlues Music is a Canadian independent record label, which specializes in blues music. The label was established in 2001, and a number of its artists and albums have since been nominated for and won Blues Music Awards. President Fred Litwin founded the company to "add substantially to the blues repertoire" with interesting, original music.

== Artists ==
- Carlos del Junco
- Doug Cox
- Eddie Turner
- Homemade Jamz Blues Band
- JW-Jones Blues Band
- Mem Shannon
- Moreland and Arbuckle
- Paul Reddick
- Samuel James
- The Twisters
- Watermelon Slim
- Zac Harmon

== Releases ==
Releases by NorthernBlues Music
Date	No.	Artist	Title	Remarks
6 March 2001	NBM0001	JW-Jones Blues Band	Defibrillatin'	
6 March 2001	NBM0002	Otis Taylor	White African	
31 July 2001	NBM0005	Paul Reddick and The Sidemen	Rattlebag	
6 November 2001	NBM0006	Archie Edwards	The Toronto Sessions	
2 April 2002	NBM0007	Otis Taylor	Respect The Dead	
18 June 2002	NBM0010	JW-Jones Blues Band	Bogart's Bounce	
4 June 2002	NBM0012	David Jacobs Strain	Stuck On The Way Back	
1 October 2002	NBM0013	NorthernBlues Gospel Allstars	Saved!	
4 February 2003	NBM0014	Harry Manx/Kevin Breit	Jubilee	
20 May 2003	NBM0015	James Cohen	High Side of Lowdown	
17 June 2003	NBM0016	Tony Lynn Washington	Been So Long	
15 July 2003	NBM0017	Various Artists	Johnny's Blues: A Tribute to Johnny Cash	
7 October 2003	NBM0500	Various Artists	Beautiful: A Tribute to Gordon Lightfoot	
2 September 2003	NBM0018	Glamourpuss	Wine and Wood	
2 March 2004	NBM0019	Taxi Chain	Smarten Up	
20 April 2004	NBM0020	John and The Sisters	John and The Sisters	
18 May 2004	NBM0021	JW-Jones Blues Band	My Kind of Evil	
7 September 2004	NBM0022	Janiva Magness	Bury Him At The Crossroads	
5 October 2004	NBM0023	Dan Treanor and Frankie Lee	African Wind	
7 September 2004	NBM0024	David Jacobs Strain	Ocean Or A Teardrop	
7 October 2004	NBM0025	Paul Reddick	Villanelle	
8 February 2005	NBM0026	Carlos del Junco	Blues Mongrel	
8 February 2005	NBM0027	Eddie Turner	Rise	
17 May 2005	NBM0028	Chris Beard	Live Wire	
19 April 2005	NBM0029	Mem Shannon	I'm From Phunkville	
13 September 2005	NBM0011	Brian Blain	Overqualified For The Blues	
12 July 2005	NBM0030	Doug Cox and Sam Hurrie	Hungry Ghosts	
14 February 2006	NBM0032	Watermelon Slim And The Workers	Untitled	
7 March 2006	NBM0033	Janiva Magness	Do I Move You?	
17 April 2006	NBM0031	Glamourpuss	Bluesman's Prayer	
15 August 2006	NBM0034	The Sisters Euclid (Kevin Breit)	Run Neil Run	
18 April 2006	NBM0035	JW-Jones Blues Band	Kissing In 29 Days	
6 June 2006	NBM0036	Eddie Turner	The Turner Diaries	
October 2006	NBM0037	The Twisters	After The Storm	
17 April 2007	NBM0038	Watermelon Slim	The Wheelman	
17 April 2007	NBM0039	Dog Cox and Salil Bhatt	Slide To Freedom	
22 May 2007	NBM0040	Paul Reddick	Revue	
10 July 2007	NBM0041	Mem Shannon	Live: A Night At Tipitina's	
4 September 2007	NBM0042	Mason Casey	Sofa King Badass	
1 April 2008	NBM0043	Samuel James	Songs Famed For Sorrow And Joy	
18 March 2008	NBM0044	Moreland And Arbuckle	1861	
13 May 2008	NBM0046	JW-Jones	Blueslisted	
24 June 2008	NBM0047	Watermelon Slim	No Paid Holidays	
10 June 2008	NBM0048	The Homemade Jamz Blues Band	Pay Me No Mind	
19 August 2008	NBM0300	Various Artists	The Future Of The Blues: Volume III	
2 September 2008	NBM0051	Carlos del Junco	Steady Movin'	
14 October 2008	NBM0050	Paul Reddick	SugarBird	
April 2009	NBM0052	Zac Harmon	From the Root	
March 2009	NBM0053	Doug Cox & Salil Bhatt	Slide to Freedom 2	
9 June 2009	NBM0055	Homemad Jamz Blues Band	I Got Blues For You	
July 2009	NBM0054	Watermelon Slim	Escape from the Chicken Coop	
September 2009	NBM0056	Samuel James	For Rosa, Maeve and Noreen	
June 2010	NBM0059	Watermelon Slim	Ringers	
July 2010	NBM0057	Eddie Turner	Miracles & Demons	

== See also ==
- List of record labels
