= Otis Taylor (musician) =

American blues musician (born 1948)

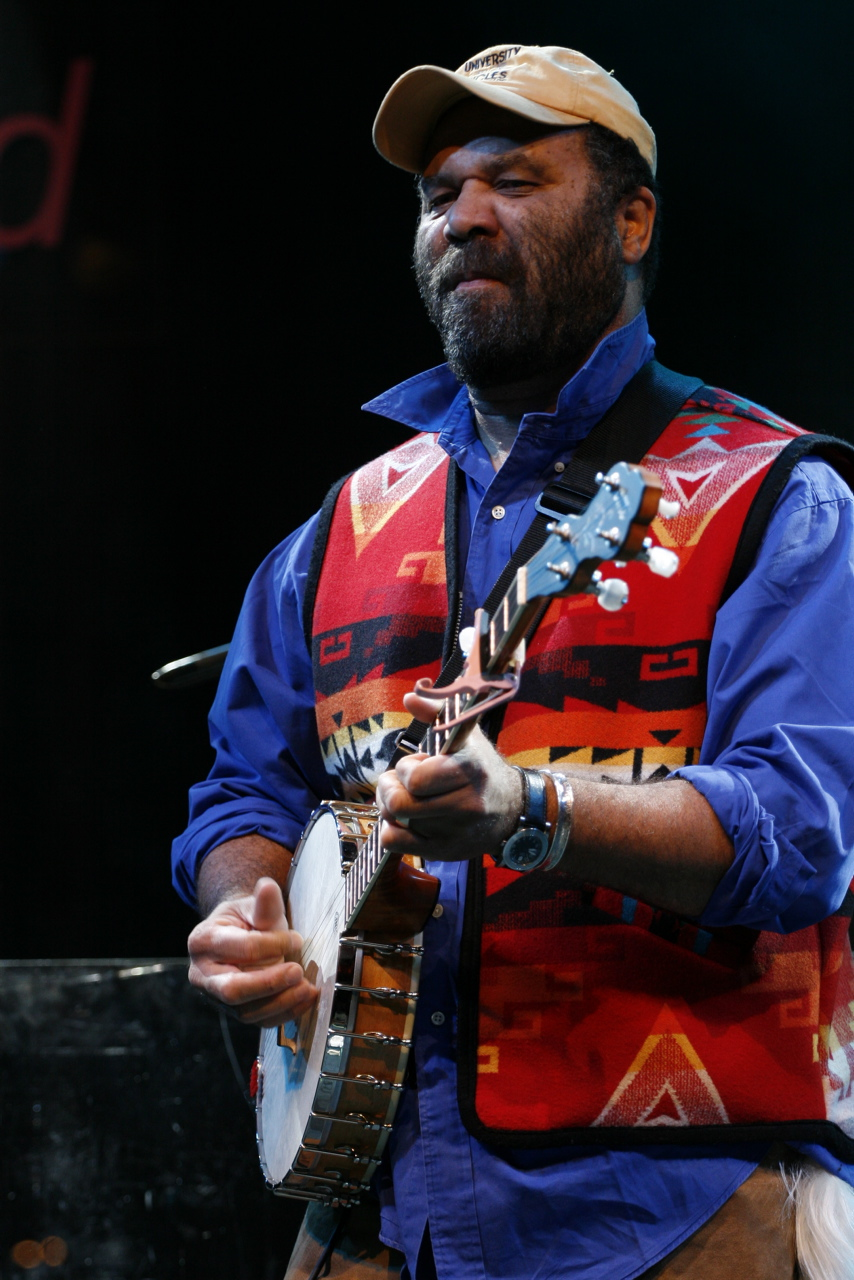
- Otis Taylor at the 2006 Jazzfestival in Frankfurt, Germany

Background information
- Born: Otis Taylor; July 30, 1948 (age 77); Chicago, Illinois, United States
- Genres: Blues, jazz
- Occupations: Musician, songwriter
- Instruments: Vocals, guitar, banjo, mandolin, harmonica
- Years active: pre-1977, 1995–present
- Labels: Telarc International Corporation, NorthernBlues Music, Shoelace Music
- Website: Otistaylor.com

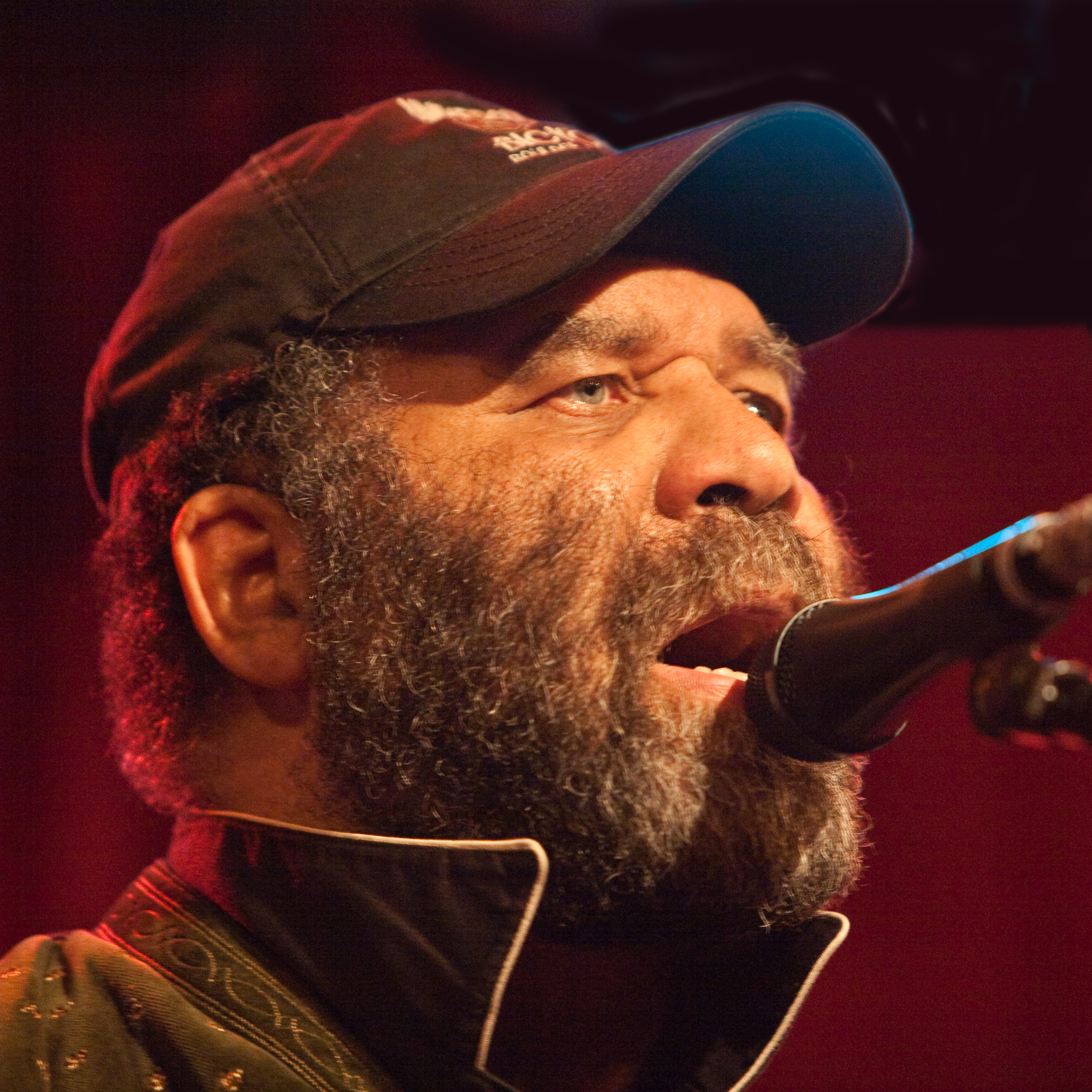
Otis Taylor in Stockholm 2012

Otis Taylor (born July 30, 1948, Chicago, Illinois, United States) is an American blues musician. He is a multi-instrumentalist whose talents include the guitar, banjo, mandolin, harmonica, and vocals. In 2001, he was awarded a fellowship to the Sundance Film Composers Laboratory.

== Career ==
=== Music ===
Taylor was born in Chicago and moved at a young age to Denver, Colorado, where he grew up. He originally grew up playing the banjo, but his father wanted him to be a jazz musician. Upon hearing that the banjo was almost exclusively used for white bluegrass instrument in part through the derogatory black-face minstrel shows of the 19th century, Taylor dropped the banjo and began to focus solely on the guitar and harmonica. He played music professionally both in Europe and the United States in a variety of blues-oriented bands, including Zephyr, until 1977, when he left the music industry for other pursuits, including becoming an antique dealer.

Taylor returned to music in 1995, and as of 2015, has released fourteen blues albums. His music tends to focus on the hard realities of life, especially relating to the black community. Some common themes in his music are murder, racism, poverty and the need for redemption. To date, Taylor has twelve Blues Music Awards nominations while White African was named 'Best Artist Debut'.

Down Beat magazine critics' Poll named Taylor's Truth is Not Fiction as Blues CD of the Year for 2002.

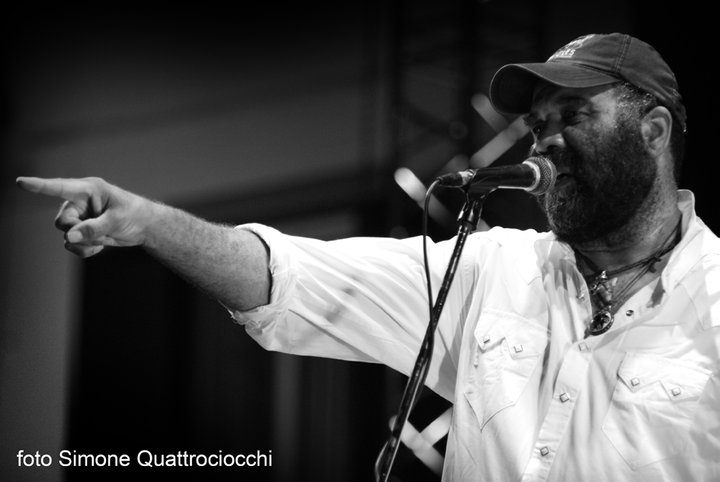
Otis Taylor at the Liri Blues fest., Italy, in 2010

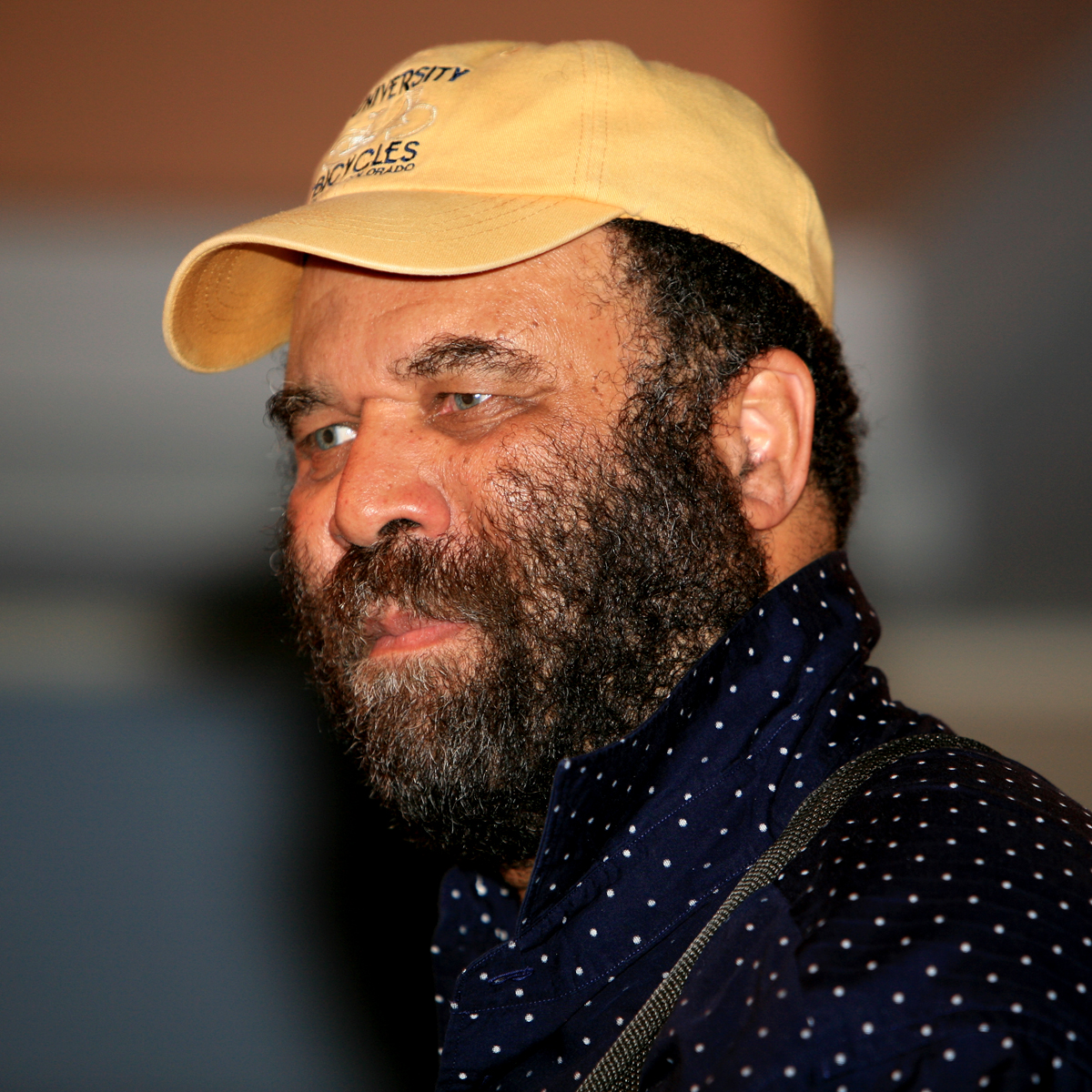
Otis Taylor in San Diego 2006

Living Blues readers' poll awarded Taylor (along with Etta James) the "Best Blues Entertainer" title in 2004. Down Beat named Taylor's Double V as Blues CD of the Year for 2005. Down Beat named Definition of a Circle as Blues CD of the Year for 2007. They also then named Recapturing the Banjo as "Blues CD of the Year, 2008."

His 2008 effort, Recapturing the Banjo, was an attempt to reconnect himself and the world with the true African origins of the banjo. "There may not be," claimed Down Beat in a review, "a better roots album released this year or decade than Recapturing the Banjo."

Taylor was the opening act on six different European tours with Irish musician Gary Moore and played on his last album.

In May 2009, Taylor won a Blues Music Award for his banjo playing. He held the first Trance Blues Festival in Boulder, Colorado, in November 2010.

Taylor's 2015 release Hey Joe Opus/Red Meat was editor's choice for album of the year in Blues Music Magazine and Premier Guitar Magazine. It was named "Album of the Year" by Blues411 and #2 by Twangville, and one of the top 30 albums of the year by The Blues magazine (UK). Down Beat gave it 4 and half stars and listed it as one of their top 100 albums of the year.

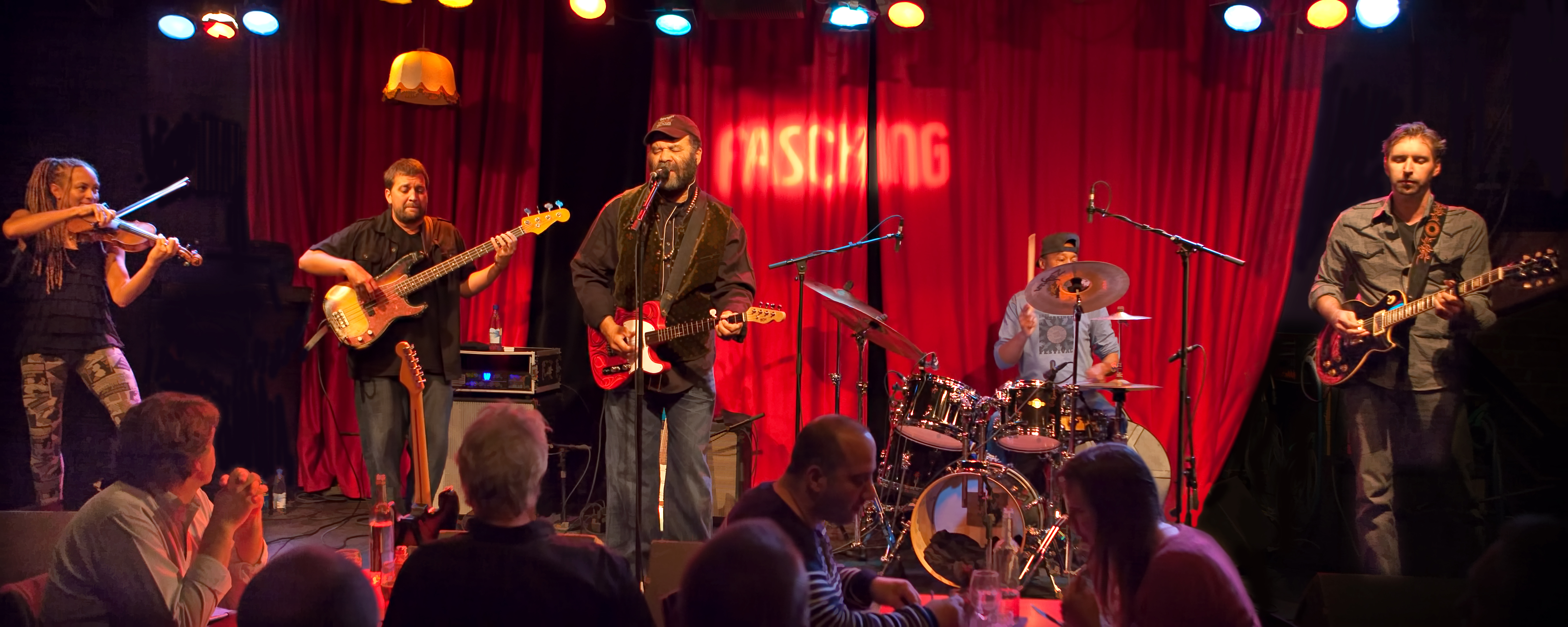
Otis Taylor Band in Stockholm 2012

=== Film ===
- The 1986 Ralph Macchio film Crossroads credits Taylor as "Jookhouse Musician – Lead Guitar."
- Three Taylor songs were used in The Badge, a 2002 film with Billy Bob Thornton: "My Soul's in Louisiana," Hands on Your Stomach," and "32nd Time."
- The 2003 film Skin Deep features the Taylor song "If the Devil Ain't Right."
- In 2005, the documentary Purvis of Overtown featured a score by Otis Taylor.
- The song "Nasty Letter," from Taylor's 2003 album Truth Is Not Fiction, was featured on the soundtrack for the 2007 film Shooter.
- Michael Mann's 2009 film Public Enemies featured two of Taylor's songs: "Ten Million Slaves" and "Nasty Letter." The former was also featured in the film's trailer.
- Four different Taylor's songs are featured in The Least Among You, a 2009 film with Louis Gossett Jr., Lauren Holly, and William Devane: "Be My Frankenstein," "Something in Your Back Pocket," "Momma Don't You Do It," and the uncredited song "A Few Feet Away."

=== Television ===
- The song "Ten Million Slaves" was used as the closing song to the episode titled "Blowback" of the FX show, Justified.
- Crossing Jordan featured Otis' song "Rosa Rosa."
- His songs were used in the science fiction series Surface.
- An Otis Taylor song was played on American Idol as part of the 2008 "Idol Gives Back" show.
- The song "Ten Million Slaves" was also played in the commercial for the 2011 season of Sons of Guns.
- "Nasty Letter" was used during the final episode of HBO series Luck.

=== Signature instruments ===
- In 2008 the Santa Cruz Guitar Company released an Otis Taylor model acoustic guitar.
- In 2007, Ome released the Otis Taylor model banjo
- In 2003, Blue Star released the Otis Taylor Banjoblaster (electric banjo)

== Personal life ==
Taylor was expelled from high school in 1966 for refusing to cut his hair and was given his diploma in 2023.

He has two daughters, one of whom is Cassie Taylor, also a musical collaborator.

== Discography ==
=== Albums ===
- Blue-Eyed Monster (1996)
- When Negroes Walked the Earth (1997/Re-released 2000, Shoelace Music)
- White African (2001, NorthernBlues Music)
- Respect the Dead (2002, Northern Blues Music)
- Truth Is Not Fiction (June 24, 2003, Telarc International)
- Double V (April 27, 2004, Telarc International)
- Below the Fold (August 23, 2005, Telarc International)
- Definition of a Circle (February 27, 2007, Telarc International)
- Recapturing the Banjo (February 5, 2008, Telarc International)
- Pentatonic Wars and Love Songs (June 23, 2009, Telarc International)
- Clovis People, Vol. 3 (May 11, 2010, Telarc International)
- Contraband (February 13, 2012, Telarc International)
- My World Is Gone (February 12, 2013, Telarc International)
- Hey Joe Opus/Red Meat (February 13, 2015, Trance Blues Festival Records (and inakustik for Europe))
- Fantasizing About Being Black (February 17, 2017, Trance Blues Festival Records)
- Banjo …, (2023, Octave Records)

=== Soundtracks ===
- Shooter – Music from the Motion Picture (2007) – "Nasty Letter"
- Public Enemies soundtrack (2009) (the tracks "Ten Million Slaves" from Recapturing the Banjo and "Nasty Letter" from Truth is Not Fiction)

=== Compilation albums ===
- Screamin' and Hollerin' the Blues, Shanachie Records, 2000
- Get the Blues, NARM, 2001
- The Future of the Blues, Northern Blues, 2002
- The Blues Foundation Presents Blues Greats, The Blues Foundation, 2002
- Beyond Mississippi, Manteca, 2002
- Harley Davidson Roadhouse Blues, The Right Stuff Records, 2002
- Roadhouse Blues, Capitol Records, 2003
- Exile on Blues Street, Telarc International, 2003
- Blues Music Awards, The Blues Foundation, 2007
- Collection, Telarc International, 2014

=== Guest artist appearances ===
- Gary Moore: Bad for You Baby, Eagle Records, 2008

== See also ==
- List of blues musicians
- List of guitarists
- List of banjo players
- Anne Harris (musician)
