= List of people from Austin, Texas =

This is a list of notable past and present residents of the U.S. city of Austin, Texas, and its surrounding metropolitan area. It does not include people whose only connection with the city is attending the University of Texas; see: List of University of Texas at Austin alumni.

== A to E ==
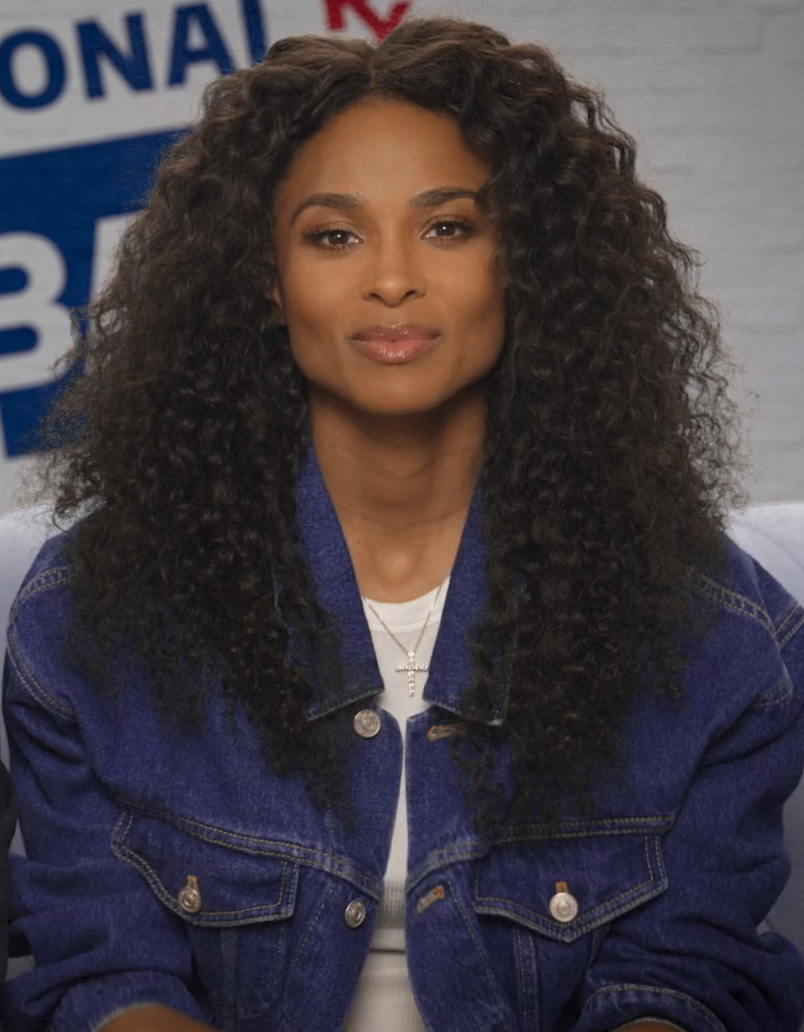
Ciara

- Nathaniel Adamolekun, soccer player
- Paco Ahlgren, writer
- Josh Alcala, soccer player
- Wes Allen, soccer player
- Marshall Allman, actor
- Natalia Anciso, artist and educator
- Wes Anderson, filmmaker
- Clifford Antone, music impresario (deceased)
- Federico Archuleta, artist
- Bob Armstrong, politician, conservationist (deceased)
- Lance Armstrong, cyclist
- Stone Cold Steve Austin, professional wrestler
- Beto Avila, soccer player
- Kerry Awn, artist, comedian, and musician
- Charlie Baird, judge and lawyer
- Marcia Ball, musician
- Nick Barbaro, South by Southwest co-creator; Austin Chronicle publisher
- Eugene C. Barker, historian (deceased)
- Lou Ann Barton, musician
- Bayley, professional wrestler
- Don Baylor, baseball player (deceased)
- Rich Beem, golfer
- Leila Bela, musician
- Dan Benjamin, podcaster, founder of 5by5 Studios
- Cedric Benson, former NFL and University of Texas running back, All-American, and Doak Walker Award winner (deceased)
- Ray Benson, musician
- Raymond Benson, author
- Russell Bentley, volunteer soldier for the Vostok Battalion and YouTuber
- Angela Bettis, actress
- Scott H. Biram, musician
- Louis Black, journalist
- Bobby Boswell, soccer player
- Ken Boswell, MLB baseball player; member of 1969 "Miracle Mets"
- Terry Bozzio, musician
- H.W. Brands, educator, author and historian
- Berkeley Breathed, cartoonist
- Drew Brees, NFL quarterback
- Douglas Brinkley, author and professor of history
- Billy Brooks, NFL player, father of Mehcad Brooks
- Mehcad Brooks, actor, male fashion model
- Danny Brown, rapper, singer, songwriter and podcast host
- Mack Brown, UT football coach
- Brian Brushwood, magician, podcaster, author, lecturer and comedian
- Sandra Bullock, Academy Award-winning actress
- Burnie Burns, director and writer
- Mark Calaway, professional wrestler
- Nicolas Cantu, actor and YouTuber
- Liz Carpenter, Lady Bird Johnson's press secretary, author (deceased)
- Greg Casar, congressman, representing portions of Austin since 2023
- Danny Cater, baseball player
- Michael Ray Charles, artist
- Ciara, singer
- Gary Clark, Jr., musician, actor, and rock star
- Gary Clarke, actor
- Leslie Cochran, Austin icon (deceased)
- Christina Cogdell, art historian
- Tyson Cole, chef
- Dabney Coleman, actor
- Shawn Colvin, musician
- Connie Yerwood Connor, physician (deceased)
- Jody Conradt, retired U.T. women's head basketball coach
- John Cornyn, U.S. senator from Texas since 2002
- Ryan Cownie, stand-up comedian
- Ben Crenshaw, golfer
- Jarrett Crippen, a.k.a. The Defuser, actor
- Ian Crocker, Olympic swimmer
- Alfred Crosby, historian, author (deceased)
- Adam Curry, a.k.a. "The Podfather", co-inventor of podcasting, announcer, Internet entrepreneur and media personality, former MTV VJ, and one of the first celebrities to personally create and administer websites
- John Paul DeJoria, businessman
- Michael Dell, businessman and CEO of Dell Technologies
- Bradley Denton, author
- G.V. Desani, author and educator (deceased)
- Alvin Devane, retired police lieutenant (deceased)
- Geoff Diehl, politician and candidate for the 2022 Massachusetts gubernatorial election
- J. Frank Dobie, author (deceased)
- Lloyd Doggett, congressman, representing portions of Austin since 1995
- Floyd Domino, musician
- Ramón H. Dovalina, retired college president
- Ulrich Ellison, musician
- Joe Ely, musician
- Roky Erickson, musician (deceased)
- Alejandro Escovedo, musician
- Akwasi Evans, journalist (deceased)

== F to Q ==
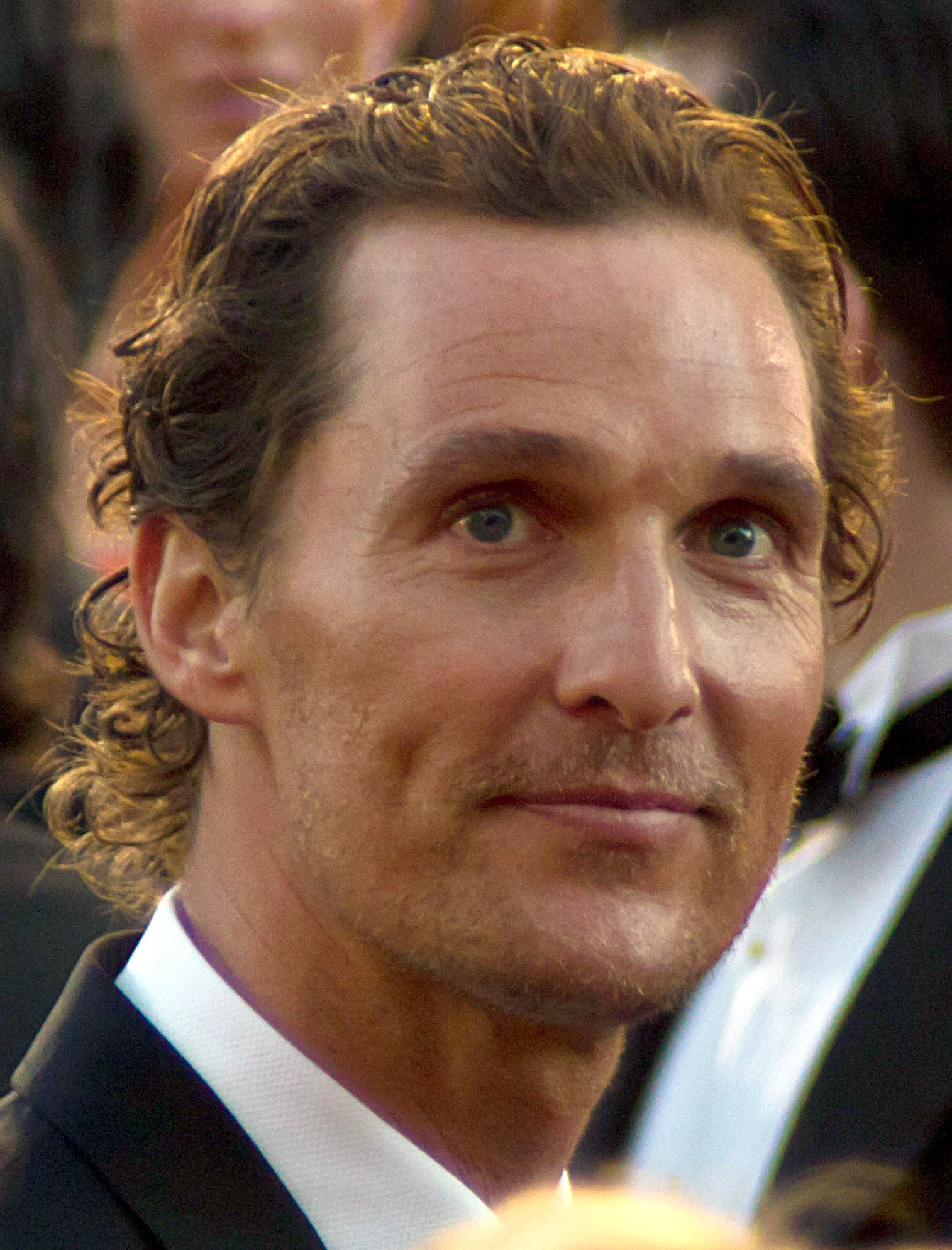
Matthew McConaughey

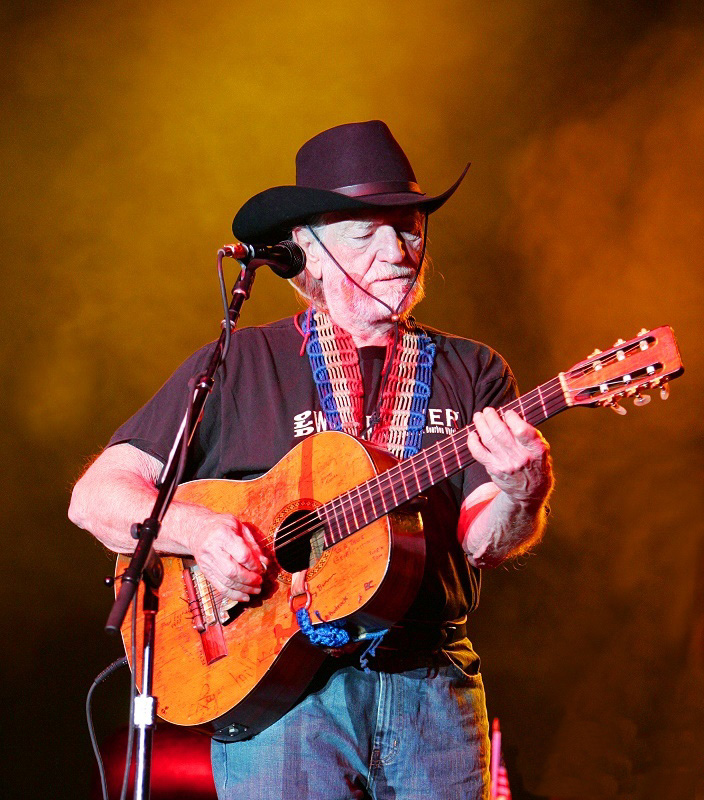
Willie Nelson

- John Henry Faulk, radio personality (deceased)
- Farrah Fawcett, actress (deceased)
- Arthur Fehr, architect (deceased)
- Eric Felton, NFL player
- Charlie Fern, White House speechwriter, journalist
- Carly Fiorina, businesswoman, politician
- Nick Foles, NFL quarterback
- Michelle Forbes, actress
- Tom Ford, fashion designer
- Jim Franklin, artist
- Joe B. Frantz, historian (deceased)
- Gavin Free, Entertainer
- Ben Fricke, NFL football player (deceased)
- Lex Fridman, computer scientist and podcaster
- Kinky Friedman, musician, writer (deceased)
- Max Frost, musician
- Buddy Garcia, interim Texas Railroad Commissioner
- Gustavo L. "Gus" García, mayor of Austin (deceased)
- Richard Garriott, video game developer
- David Garza, musician
- Ricky D. Gibbs, US Army brigadier general, born in Austin
- Eliza Gilkyson, musician
- Jimmie Dale Gilmore, musician
- Alberto Gonzales, U.S. attorney general
- Brea Grant, actress
- Kellye Gray, jazz vocalist
- Jehmu Greene, political activist
- Michael Griffin, NFL player
- Patty Griffin, musician
- Nanci Griffith, musician (deceased)
- Marc Gunn, musician, podcaster
- Sarah Hagan, actress
- Cully Hamner, comic book artist and writer
- Butch Hancock, musician, poet, singer, songwriter
- Brendan Hansen, Olympic swimmer
- Johnny Hardwick, comedian, writer (deceased)
- James C. Harrington, founder of the Texas Civil Rights Project
- Ryan Harrison, tennis player
- Russell Harvard, actor
- Bess Lomax Hawes, folk musician, folklorist, researcher (deceased)
- Ethan Hawke, actor
- Deborah Hay, choreographer
- Gibby Haynes, musician
- Amber Heard, actress
- Sherman Hemsley, actor (deceased)
- Thomas "Hollywood" Henderson, NFL player, civic leader, philanthropist
- John Q. Henion, US Army lieutenant general, retired to Austin
- Mark Henry, professional wrestler
- O. Henry, author (deceased)
- Sophia Hernandez, musician (saxophone)
- Don Hertzfeldt, filmmaker
- Joel Heyman, entertainer
- Sara Hickman, musician
- Bill Hicks, comedian (deceased)
- Jim Hightower, journalist, politician
- Tony Hinchcliffe, comedian and podcast host
- Barbara Hines, immigration rights attorney
- Tish Hinojosa, musician
- Chad Holt, musician (deceased)
- Tobe Hooper, film director (deceased)
- Beau Hossler, professional golfer
- Zachariah Hoyt, Streamer and Political commentator
- Angee Hughes, actress
- Karen Hughes, undersecretary of state, White House counsel
- Matt Hullum, director and writer
- James Hynes, author
- Molly Ivins, author, journalist (deceased)
- Conor Jackson, MLB player
- Lee Jackson, composer
- Steve Jackson, game designer
- Jaxon, comic book artist, historian (deceased)
- Charles J. Jenkins, Illinois state representative and lawyer (deceased)
- Robert Jensen, journalism professor, author, political activist
- Curtis Jerrells (born 1987), basketball player for Hapoel Jerusalem of Israeli Premier League
- Dakota Johnson, actress
- Eric Johnson, guitarist
- Lady Bird Johnson, First Lady (deceased)
- Lyndon B. Johnson, U.S. president (deceased)
- Daniel Johnston, musician (deceased)
- Alex Jones, conspiracy theorist
- Angus T. Jones, actor
- Kydd Jones, musician, rapper and producer
- Janis Joplin, musician (deceased)
- Barbara Jordan, U.S. congresswoman, professor (deceased)
- Mike Judge, cartoonist, actor, voice actor, filmmaker
- Guy Juke, artist
- Douglas Kellner, philosopher, author
- Jeff Kent, former MLB NL MVP
- Hilmer Kenty, world champion boxer, born in Austin
- William Astor Kirk, church lay leader (deceased)
- Tom Kite, golfer
- Taylor Kitsch, actor
- Harry Knowles, film critic
- Kim Krizan, screenwriter, actress
- Kandace Krueger, Miss Texas USA 2001 and Miss USA 2001
- Jimmy LaFave, singer, songwriter, musician (deceased)
- Dick "Night Train" Lane, NFL Hall of Fame defensive back; set single-season record for interceptions (14, in 1950) (deceased)
- Tim League, film producer and founder of the Alamo Drafthouse cinemas
- Russell Lee, photographer (deceased)
- Ryan Lee, actor
- Lashonda Lester, stand-up comedian (deceased)
- Will Licon, swimmer
- Richard Linklater, film director, producer, and screenwriter
- The Lizardman (Erik Sprague), sideshow performer, known for his body modifications
- Alan Lomax, ethnomusicologist (deceased)
- John Lomax, musicologist, folklorist, teacher (deceased)
- Paul London, professional wrestler
- John Mackey, businessman
- Matt Mackowiak, political consultant
- Natalie Maines, singer
- Michael Malice, author, podcaster, and political thinker
- Terrence Malick, film director
- Julian Mandrake, musician
- Nick Matzorkis, entrepreneur, musician
- Tucker Max, author
- Baker Mayfield, professional football player, Heisman Trophy winner
- Terry McBride, musician
- Tim McCanlies, film director
- Michael McCaul, congressman, representing portions of Austin since 2005
- Matthew McConaughey, Academy Award-winning actor
- Michelle McCool, professional wrestler
- Forrest Howard McDonald (born 1950), blues rock musician
- Benjamin McKenzie, actor
- James McMurtry, musician
- Doug Mellard, stand-up comedian
- James Michener, author (deceased)
- Kevin Millar, former MLB player
- Ed Miller, musician, folklorist
- Rhett Miller, musician, singer-songwriter
- Farrah Moan, drag queen, entertainer
- Larry Monroe, radio DJ (deceased)
- Monte Montgomery, guitarist
- Elizabeth Moon, author
- Abra Moore, musician
- Gurf Morlix, musician
- Robert Morrow, Republican Party county chairman
- Kate Moss, model
- Richard Moya, county commissioner
- Elon Musk, businessman
- Edwin Neal, actor, writer, comedian
- Nelly, rap artist
- Willie Nelson, musician
- Elisabet Ney, artist (deceased)
- Matt Noveskey, musician
- Robert N. Noyce, inventor, entrepreneur (deceased)
- Michael O'Brien, photographer
- Madalyn Murray O'Hair, atheist activist (deceased)
- Chad Oliver, author (deceased)
- Ephraim Owens, musician
- David Mercier Parsons, 2011 Texas State Poet Laureate
- Aaron Peirsol, athlete
- Pinetop Perkins, musician (deceased)
- Grace Phipps, actress
- Turk Pipkin, activist, author, actor
- Robert Plant, musician
- Alan Pogue, photojournalist
- Glen Powell, actor
- Priscilla Presley, actress, businesswoman
- Gary Primich, blues musician (deceased)
- Ben H. Procter, historian (deceased)
- Cactus Pryor, radio personality (deceased)

== R to Z ==
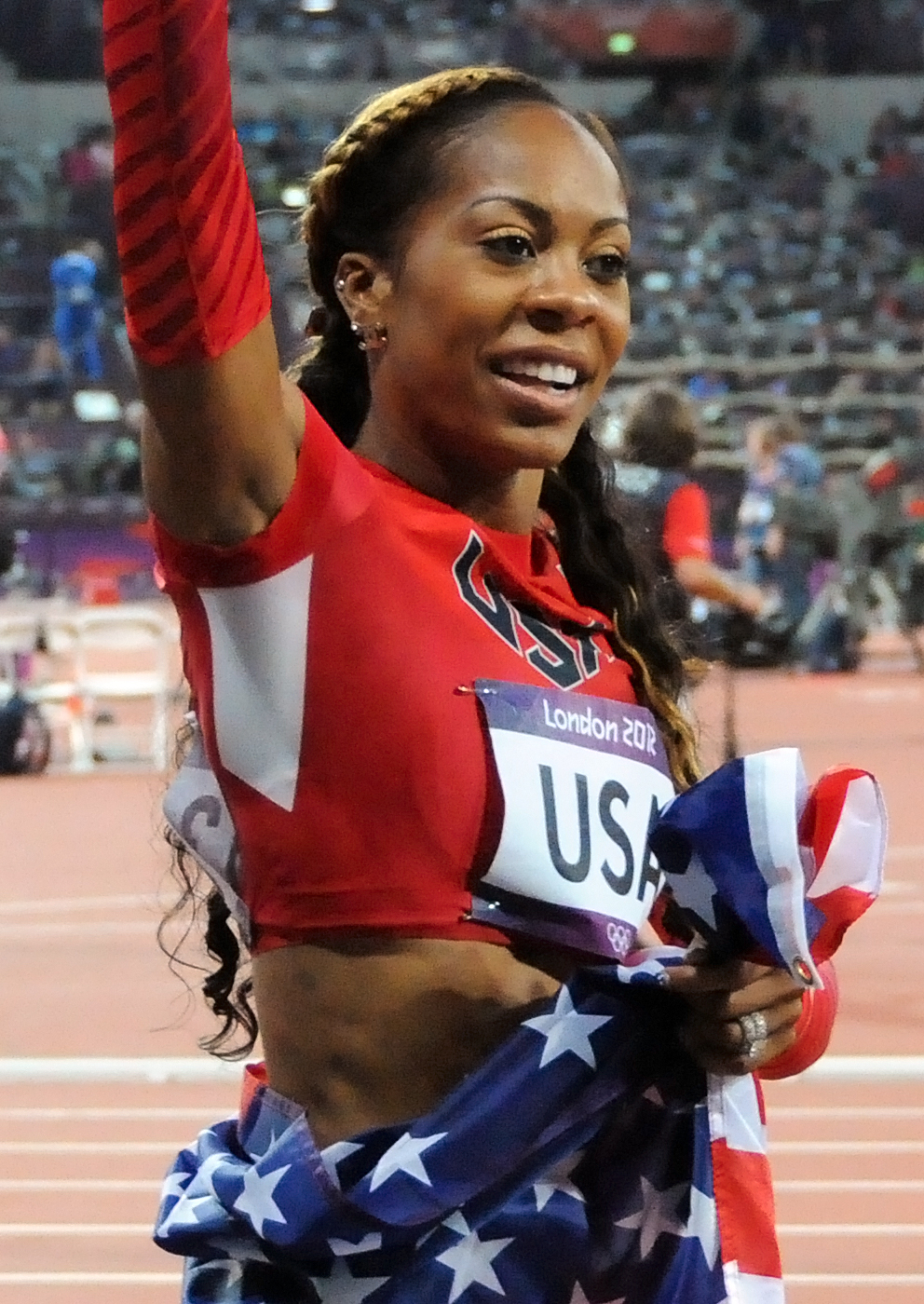
Sanya Richards-Ross

- Geoff Ramsey, entertainer
- Dan Rather, journalist, TV anchor
- Bob Ray, filmmaker
- Luke Redfield, musician, activist
- Spencer Redford, actor
- Coke Reed, mathematician and inventor
- Ryan Rees, rugby union player
- Dustin Rhodes, professional wrestler
- Ann Richards, governor 1991–1995 (deceased)
- Sanya Richards-Ross, athlete
- Rich Riley, executive with Yahoo!
- Chris Roberts, game designer
- Andy Roddick, tennis player
- Robert Rodriguez, film director
- Joe Rogan, actor, comedian, and podcast host
- Christy Carlson Romano, actress, singer, and podcast host
- Daniel "C418" Rosenfeld, musician
- Karl Rove, political advisor
- Chip Roy, U.S. representative, representing parts of Austin since 2019
- Darrell Royal, UT football coach (deceased)
- Justin Ruggiano, MLB baseball player
- Louis Sachar, children's author
- Jay O. Sanders, actor
- Ben Sargent, editorial cartoonist
- Tony Scalzo, musician, songwriter
- Schave & Reilly, comedy duo
- Linda Schele, Mayanist, art historian (deceased)
- Robert Schenkkan, playwright, screenwriter, Pulitzer Prize for Drama
- Denise Schmandt-Besserat, archaeologist
- Kendra Scott, jeweler
- Zachary Scott, actor (deceased)
- John Jarvis Seabrook, theologian, Methodist pastor, and academic administrator; lived in Austin (deceased)
- Austin Wayne Self, NASCAR driver
- Gilbert Shelton, comic book artist
- Gustavo Sorola, Entertainer
- Esperanza Spalding, musician, composer, educator, bandleader
- Warren Spector, game designer
- Julian Spence, football player (deceased)
- David Spicer, organist and choirmaster (deceased)
- Harry Stafford, football player (deceased)
- Tommy Shane Steiner, musician
- Bruce Sterling, author
- Emma Stone, actress
- Carole Strayhorn, politician (deceased)
- David Stuart, Mayanist, epigrapher
- Don Tate, author and illustrator of children's books
- Karen T. Taylor, forensic and portrait artist
- Lia Thomas, swimmer
- Reji Thomas, glass artist and painter
- Kenneth Threadgill, tavern owner and country singer (deceased)
- Chris Tomlin, musician
- John Treviño Jr., first Mexican-American on Austin city council (deceased)
- Charles Umlauf, artist (deceased)
- Kathy Valentine, musician, songwriter
- Townes Van Zandt, musician (deceased)
- John Varley, science fiction writer (deceased)
- Jimmie Vaughan, musician
- Stevie Ray Vaughan, musician (deceased)
- Lizzie Velásquez, motivational speaker and author
- Louis A. Waldman, art historian
- Howard Waldrop, author (deceased)
- Jerry Jeff Walker, musician (deceased)
- Eli Wallach, actor (deceased)
- Don Webb, author
- Walter Prescott Webb, author and historian (deceased)
- Garrett Weber-Gale, Olympic swimmer
- Steven Weinberg, physicist, Nobel laureate (deceased)
- Spencer Wells, geneticist, anthropologist
- Willie Wells, Negro League shortstop; member of three baseball Halls of Fame (US, Mexico, Cuba) (deceased)
- Charles S. West, jurist, politician (deceased)
- Florence Duval West, poet; wife of Charles S. West (deceased)
- Blaire White, gun rights activist
- Julie White, Tony-award winning actress
- Mack White, comic book artist
- Ron White, comedian, actor, and author
- Martha E. Whitten, author (deceased)
- Mike Wiebe, musician (The Riverboat Gamblers), actor, and stand-up comedian
- Wiley Wiggins, actor
- Barry Williamson, lawyer, member of Texas Railroad Commission
- Kelly Willis, musician
- Cody Wilson, founder and director of Defense Distributed; inventor of the Liberator 3D printed gun
- Eddie Wilson, co-founder of the Armadillo World Headquarters and owner of Threadgill's restaurants
- Owen Wilson, actor
- Robin Wilson, eco-designer, author and lifestyle brand
- Roxanne Wilson, attorney
- Elijah Wood, actor
- Chuck Woolery, game show host, conservative activist (deceased)
- Lawrence Wright, writer, journalist
- Zack Wright, professional basketball player
- Cale Yarborough, athlete, adventure racer (Eco-Challenge Fiji), producer (deceased)

== See also ==
- Music of Austin
