= Allen West (politician) =

American politician & military officer (born 1961)

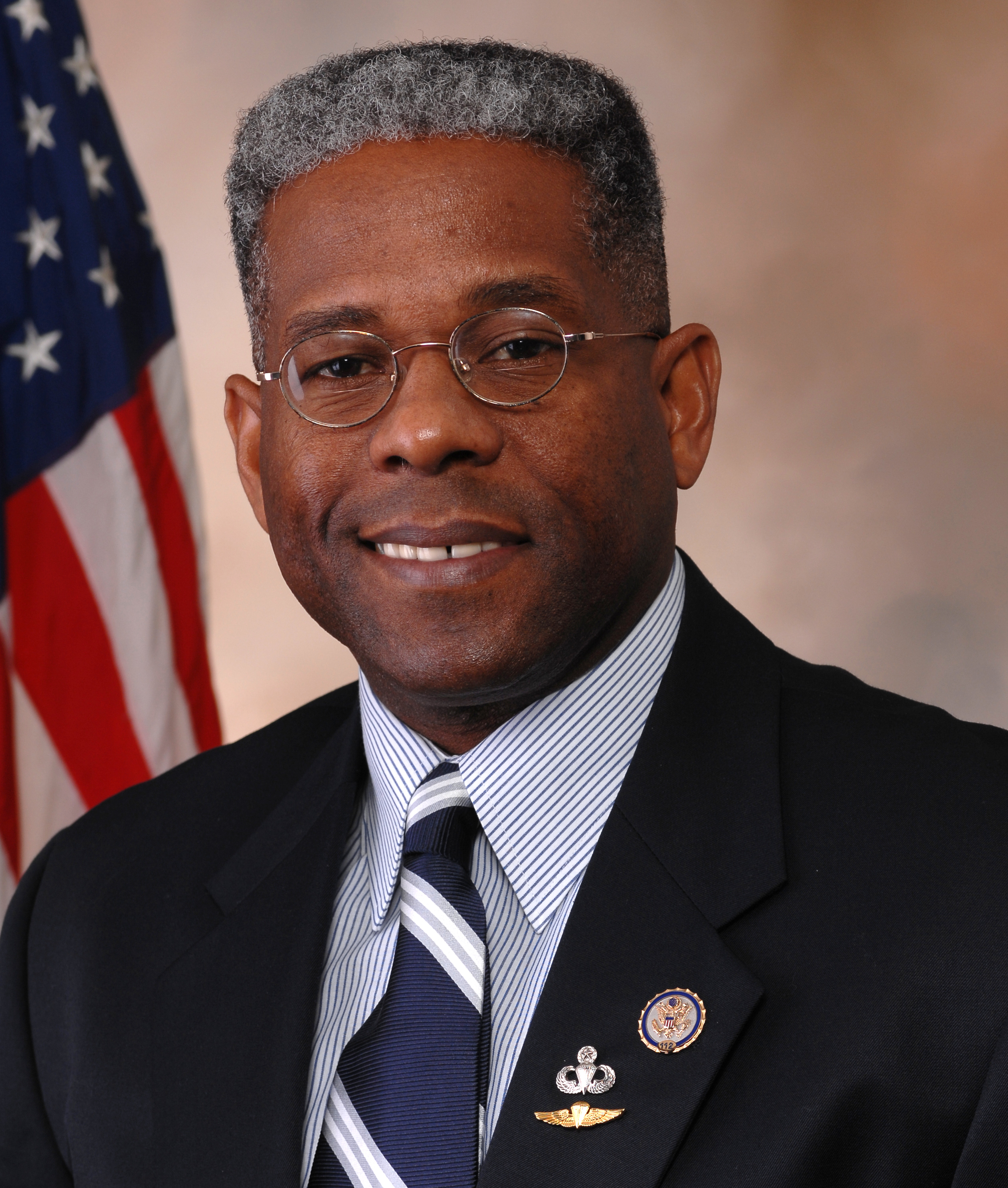
- Official portrait, 2011

Chair of the Texas Republican Party
- In office July 20, 2020 – July 11, 2021
- Preceded by: James Dickey
- Succeeded by: Matt Rinaldi

Member of the U.S. House of Representatives from Florida's 22nd district
- In office January 3, 2011 – January 3, 2013
- Preceded by: Ron Klein
- Succeeded by: Lois Frankel

Personal details
- Born: Allen Bernard West; February 7, 1961 (age 65) Atlanta, Georgia, U.S.
- Party: Republican
- Spouse: Angela Graham (m. 1989)
- Children: 2
- Education: University of Tennessee (BA); Kansas State University (MA); United States Army Command and General Staff College (MMAS)

Military service
- Branch/service: United States Army
- Years of service: 1983–2004 (Army); 2019–present (Guard)
- Rank: Lieutenant Colonel
- Unit: Texas State Guard
- Commands: 2nd Battalion, 20th Field Artillery Regiment
- Battles/wars: Gulf War; Iraq War
- Awards: Bronze Star; Meritorious Service Medal; Army Commendation Medal; Army Achievement Medal

Allen Bernard West (born February 7, 1961) is an American politician and retired military officer. A member of the Republican Party, West represented Florida's 22nd congressional district in the United States House of Representatives from 2011 to 2013 and served as the chairman of the Republican Party of Texas from 2020 to 2021. He was the chairman of the Dallas County Republican Party from 2024 to April 2026.

West was born and raised in Atlanta, Georgia, and began his military career in 1983 after graduating from the University of Tennessee. He was deployed to Kuwait in 1991 and Iraq in 2003. In 2003, West was charged in an incident that involved the beating and mock execution of an Iraqi policeman, with West firing a gun near the Iraqi man's head during an interrogation. After an Article 32 hearing was held, West accepted non-judicial punishment, was fined $5,000, and allowed to retire as a lieutenant colonel. After leaving the army, West moved to Florida, where he taught at a high school for a year and worked for a defense contractor, part of this time spent in Afghanistan as a civilian adviser to the Afghan National Army.

West entered politics in 2008 as the Republican nominee for Florida's 22nd congressional district, losing to Democratic incumbent Ron Klein. In a rematch in 2010, he won the seat, coinciding with significant Republican gains in that year's midterm elections. West took office in January 2011 as the first African-American Republican member of Congress from Florida since Josiah T. Walls left office in 1876 near the end of Reconstruction. In Congress, West was a high-profile member of the Tea Party Caucus and the Tea Party movement. Widely described as a "firebrand conservative", West stirred controversy during his time in Congress for incendiary comments about Islam, descriptions of President Barack Obama as a "low-level Socialist agitator", and unfounded accusations that 81 Democratic members of Congress were members of the Communist Party. Redistricting due to the 2010 census resulted in West switching to Florida's 18th congressional district for the 2012 House elections. He narrowly lost to Democratic nominee Patrick Murphy in what was the most expensive congressional House race that year.

West ran for the chairmanship of the Republican Party of Texas in 2020. West became the new state chairman after he defeated the incumbent chairman, James Dickey, on July 20, 2020. On June 4, 2021, West announced his resignation as GOP chair, fueling speculation that he would challenge Governor Greg Abbott in the 2022 gubernatorial primary. On July 4, 2021, West announced his run for governor of Texas from his church in Carrollton, Texas. His resignation was effective July 11, when the State Republican Executive Committee met to select his successor. On the way out, West has received criticism within the Texas GOP for having a conflict of interest; it has been alleged that he should not have served as Texas GOP chair and campaigned for governor at the same time. He was defeated by Abbott in the primary.

== Early life and education ==
Allen Bernard West was born in Atlanta, Georgia, to Elizabeth (Thomas; 1931–1994) West and Herman West, Sr. (1920–1986) on February 7, 1961. His father and older brother were both career military officers; West's father served in World War II, and his brother served in Vietnam. His mother was a civilian employee of the United States Marine Corps. Although both of his parents were registered Democrats, West has remarked that they raised him "very conservatively".

In the tenth grade of high school, West joined the Junior Reserve Officers' Training Corps program. After graduation from high school, he attended the University of Tennessee, where he joined the Army ROTC program. Upon graduation from the University of Tennessee in 1983, he was commissioned as an officer in the Field Artillery branch and entered active duty in the U.S. Army. West is the third of four consecutive generations in his family to serve in the U.S. Armed Forces. He later received a master's degree in political science from Kansas State University. He also earned a master of military arts and sciences degree from the U.S. Army Command and General Staff Officer College in political theory and military history and operations.

== Military career (1983–2004, 2019–present) ==
=== Overview ===
West entered active duty on November 1, 1983, at Fort Sill, Oklahoma, where he completed the Field Artillery Officer's Basic Course (FAOBC). He then proceeded to airborne training at Fort Benning, Georgia, where he received his Parachutist Badge. His first assignment was as an airborne infantry fire support officer and platoon leader, as well as battalion training officer for the 4th BCT(Battalion Combat Team), 325th Airborne Infantry Regiment, SETAF (Southern European Task Force) under the command of LTC Thomas R. Needham at Caserma Ederle in Vicenza, Italy. In 1987, West was promoted to captain and attended the Field Artillery Officer's Advanced Course. Following graduation, West took command of B Battery, 6th Field Artillery Regiment, 1st Infantry Division. He served as the battalion task force fire support officer for 2d Battalion, 16th Infantry Regiment. As a member of the 1st Infantry Division he deployed for Operation Desert Shield and Operation Desert Storm.

After returning from Kuwait, West served as an Army ROTC instructor at Kansas State University from 1991 to 1994, becoming the U.S. Army ROTC Instructor of the Year in 1993. In January 1995 he was assigned to the 2nd Infantry Division Support Command as the assistant operations/combat plans officer. West was promoted to major before he attended the U.S. Army Command and General Staff College in 1997. Upon completion, he became the operations officer for the 18th Field Artillery Brigade before being assigned as executive officer of 1st Battalion, 377th Field Artillery Regiment. Afterward, West served as an Army exchange officer at the II Marine Expeditionary Force at Camp Lejeune from 1999 to 2002 and was promoted to lieutenant colonel.

The culminating assignment of West's career was his assumption of command of the 2nd Battalion, 20th Field Artillery Regiment, 4th Infantry Division on June 6, 2002. During the Iraq War in 2003, he deployed with his battalion until he was relieved of command by the Army following a use-of-force incident concerning an Iraqi policeman. At his Article 32 hearing, West admitted violating Army rules by holding the policeman captive, punching him in the face, conducting a mock execution and by dry-firing an unloaded pistol held against the Iraqi's head. West was subsequently allowed to retire in 2004.

West's awards and decorations include the Bronze Star; Meritorious Service Medal (two Oak Leaf Clusters); Army Commendation Medal (three Oak Leaf Clusters, one Valor Device); Army Achievement Medal (one Oak Leaf Cluster); Valorous Unit Award; Air Assault Badge; and the Master Parachutist Badge.

=== Iraq torture incident ===
While serving in Taji, Iraq, West received information from an intelligence specialist about a plot to ambush his unit. The alleged plot involved Yahya Jhodri Hamoodi, an Iraqi police officer. West had his men detain Hamoodi. Soldiers testified that in the process of detaining Hamoodi, he appeared to reach for his weapon and needed to be subdued. Hamoodi was beaten by four soldiers from the 2/20th Field Artillery Battalion on the head and body. West then fired his pistol near Hamoodi's head, after which Hamoodi provided West with names and information, which Hamoodi later described as "meaningless information induced by fear and pain". At least one of these suspects was arrested as a result, but no plans for attacks or weapons were found. West said "At the time I had to base my decision on the intelligence I received. It's possible that I was wrong about Mr. Hamoodi."

West was charged with violating Articles 128 (assault) and 134 (general article) of the Uniform Code of Military Justice. During a hearing held as part of an Article 32 investigation in November 2003, West stated, "I know the method I used was not right, but I wanted to take care of my soldiers." The charges were ultimately referred to an Article 15 proceeding rather than court-martial, at which West was fined $5,000. West accepted the judgment and retired with full benefits as a lieutenant colonel in the summer of 2004. Asked if he would act differently under similar circumstances, West testified, "If it's about the lives of my soldiers at stake, I'd go through hell with a gasoline can." At his hearing, West said that there were no ambushes against American forces in Taji until he was relieved of his leadership post a month later. After West's retirement he received more than 2,000 letters and e-mails offering him moral support. A letter supporting West was signed by 95 members of the U.S. Congress and sent to the Secretary of the Army.

=== Texas State Guard ===
On August 29, 2019, West was sworn into the Texas State Guard. The ceremony took place at Globe Life Park in Arlington, Texas as part of the festivities of a Texas Rangers–Seattle Mariners baseball game. As per the policies of the Texas Military Department, West retained the same rank he held while in federal military service, lieutenant colonel.

== Post-active duty military career (2004–2007) ==
After retiring from the Army, West and his family moved to Florida. He taught U.S. history and coached track and field at Deerfield Beach High School for a year. He then spent two years working for Military Professional Resources Inc. (MPRI), a private military company. While with MPRI, West was positioned in Kandahar, Afghanistan. In that capacity, he was an adviser to the Afghan National Army.

== U.S. House of Representatives ==
=== Elections ===
2008

In 2006, 25-year incumbent Republican E. Clay Shaw, Jr. was defeated by Democrat Ron Klein in Florida's 22nd Congressional District. The district was located in Broward and Palm Beach counties, and included parts of Fort Lauderdale, Boca Raton and Palm Beach. Allen West entered politics in 2008 to regain the lost House seat, challenging freshman incumbent Klein. West received the Republican nomination without opposition. However, he lost to Klein by a margin of 9.4% of the votes. The official results were Klein with 169,041 votes (54.7%), and West with 140,104 votes (45.3%).

2010

West ran in a rematch with Klein. He spoke at the Conservative Political Action Conference on February 20, 2010, and was endorsed by former Alaska Governor Sarah Palin. West was one of 32 African-American Republican candidates for Congress in 2010. He said he supported the Tea Party movement and rejected the notion that the movement was motivated by racism, saying the accusation was a creation of liberal critics and the news media. He was described as a "tea party star" became a member of the congressional Tea Party Caucus in February 2011.

In September 2010, the Florida Democratic Party produced a flyer that contained West's unredacted Social Security number. While the party called it an "oversight" and offered to pay for identity theft protection, West harshly condemned the flyer for exposing his family to identity theft.

West defeated Klein by a margin of 8.8%. Along with newly elected South Carolina Representative Tim Scott, he was one of the first African-American Republicans in Congress since J.C. Watts retired in 2003. West raised $5.4 million for his campaign, while his incumbent opponent raised $2.5 million. According to West, "...over 97 percent of our donations have come from individual contributions."

2012

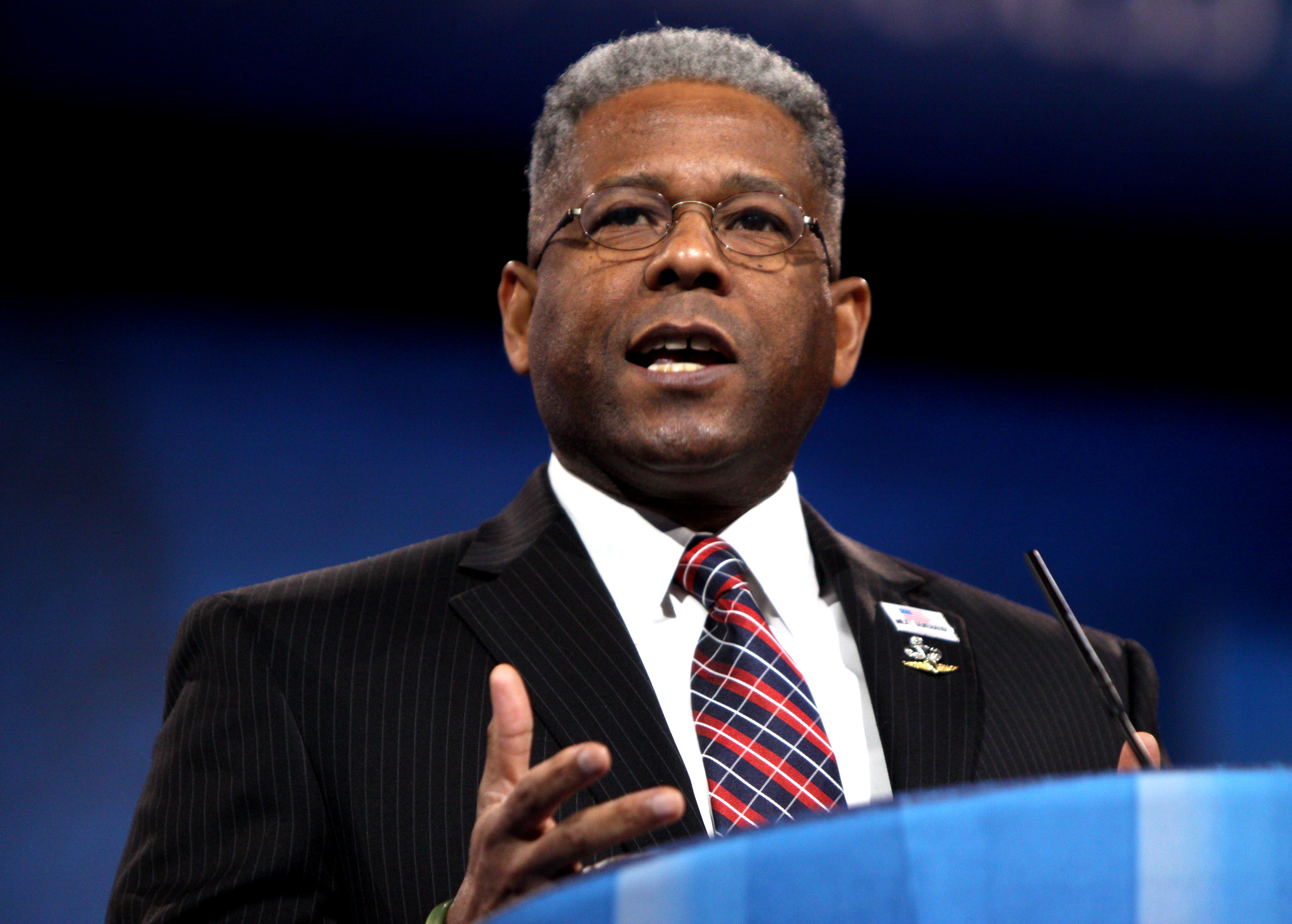
West speaking at the 2013 Conservative Political Action Conference (CPAC) in Washington, D.C.

West raised more than $1.5 million in the 2011 second quarter to support his 2012 reelection bid. The National Journal's Cook Political Report in 2011 named West one of the top 10 Republicans most vulnerable to redistricting in 2012.

Redistricting made the 22nd, which already had a modest Democratic lean, even more Democratic. West faced the prospect of running against West Palm Beach mayor Lois Frankel in the general election. On February 1, 2012, West announced that he would run for reelection in the neighboring 18th District. That district had previously been the 16th, represented by fellow Republican Tom Rooney. However, Rooney opted to seek reelection in the newly created 17th District, a move that was considered likely to dramatically improve West's chances of reelection, although it was still a competitive race.

In the new district, West received a primary challenge from Martin County Sheriff Robert Crowder. West did not debate Crowder and said "debating an uninformed opponent would waste voters' time". Incumbent West defeated Crowder in a landslide, receiving 74.4% of the vote.

His general election opponent was Democrat Patrick Murphy, a political newcomer and a Republican until 2011. The campaign featured several negative ads, including one released by American Sunrise PAC that was extremely critical of West's policies and depicted him in violent cartoon action against several individuals. West issued a statement condemning the ad, stating that it "plays on stereotypes" with the goal of diverting Americans from more pressing matters at hand such as high unemployment. He claimed the ad was released by the family of his opponent. The campaign manager of his opponent, said the ad was from a third party and therefore held no liability for it. After primary opponent Crowder endorsed Murphy, a spokesman of the West campaign said "Crowder is a Democrat and a sore loser. I'm shocked he waited this long. Perhaps Crowder hopes to continue cozying up to local Democrats so he can be their nominee against Allen West in 2014."

Initial vote counts showed Murphy defeating West by a narrow margin of 2,000 votes. West did not concede, citing irregularities in St. Lucie County where some early ballots may have been counted twice. Florida state election officials unofficially certified Murphy as the winner. A partial recount of early ballots cast between November 1 and 3, 2012, in St. Lucie County slightly decreased the margin separating the candidates, and the West campaign sought further recounts. West said that if the final results show a loss, he would not cling to his title as a member of Congress, but wanted to ensure a fair election was carried out, raising the potential of a protracted legal battle. As of the November 18 state deadline, the St. Lucie County election officials had not completed a recount of all of the early ballots, and so the previously submitted vote count which showed Murphy as the winner by 2,146 votes was submitted to the state election officials. The West campaign conceded the election on November 20, 2012. Meanwhile, Frankel went on to victory in the 22nd.

=== Tenure ===
There are those who will hate your own country, America, regardless of the self-evident truths. To you I say that life just does not get any better than the 'Land of the all night IHOP' … and if you truly hate America so much, you are also free to find another home. There is surely an illegal immigrant who will be happy in yours.

— Allen West, in his 2007 debut monthly "Column From Kandahar" for Pamela Geller's Atlas Shrugs blog

West's rhetoric won him both support and condemnation from differing groups along the American political spectrum. Members of the conservative movement viewed him as a "torch bearer" and "conservative icon", with Sarah Palin and Ted Nugent both suggesting him for vice president, and Glenn Beck supporting him for president. In January 2013, U.S. Representatives Paul Broun (R-Georgia) and Louie Gohmert (R-Texas) both voted for West as Speaker of the House, even though he was no longer a member of Congress. Some of his statements include calling President Barack Obama "an abject failure", ordering both pro-Palestinian demonstrators and the views of "chicken men" Democrats to "get the hell out" of the United States, opining that drivers with Obama bumper stickers are "a threat to the gene pool", and pronouncing that African American Democrats are trying to keep African Americans "on the plantation", while casting himself as the "modern-day Harriet Tubman" ferrying them to rescue. In a critical summation of West's style, the liberal magazine Mother Jones opined that "[for West] every sentence is a proxy war in the larger struggle between patriots and the 'people in this world that just have to have their butts kicked'".

In January 2011, West joined House Foreign Affairs Committee chairwoman Ileana Ros-Lehtinen (R-FL) in condemning the official flying of a Palestine Liberation Organization flag in Washington D.C. West said that the raising of the flag is "an attempt to legitimize an organization with a known history of terrorist actions". In February, West described Michael Ledeen as one of his "foreign policy heroes", and implored his followers to read Saul Alinsky's Rules for Radicals to "understand what they're up against". Other authors West has cited in helping him shape his worldview include philosopher John Stuart Mill and Union Army General William Tecumseh Sherman.

On June 2, 2011, Allen West wrote a letter to President Obama urging him to grant clemency to Jonathan Pollard. Mr. West wrote, "After serving 26 years behind bars, Jonathan Pollard's health is deteriorating, as is his wife's. If we can consent to the release by the British of the Lockerbie bomber back to Libya due to health concerns, how can we justify keeping Mr. Pollard behind bars when his crimes were clearly not as serious as a terrorist who murdered hundreds of Americans?" Pollard was released on November 20, 2015, in accordance with federal guidelines in place at the time of his sentencing. Anne Pollard, his ex-wife, said "No one helped him. No government reduced his sentence by even one day."

West attempted to cast his work overseas in historical terms, theorizing that America is following in the footsteps of Charles Martel at the Battle of Tours, or the 300 Spartan Hoplites at the Battle of Thermopylae, in defending Western civilization against Muslim threats from the Middle East. In speaking on what he believed to be Islam's proclivity for violence, West remarked that "Something happened when Mohammed enacted the Hijra and he left Mecca and he went out to Medina, it became violence." Because of this view, in February 2011, West cited the threat of "radical Islamic terrorists" as his motivation for voting to extend provisions of the Patriot Act; He voted against another extension in May 2011. When asked during an interview with The Shalom Show how he would work with others "like Keith Ellison, who supports Islam", West stated that Ellison, a Minnesota representative and practicing Muslim, represents the "antithesis of the principles upon which this country was established". West later argued that his initial comment was misconstrued. He said the comments were "not about his Islamic faith, but about his continued support of the Council on American-Islamic Relations (CAIR)". In a Boynton Beach Town Hall meeting, West told the Miami leader of CAIR that "I will always defend your right to practice a free religion under the First Amendment, but what you must understand, if I am speaking the truth, I am not going to stop speaking the truth. The truth is not subjective." West has been on the Advisory Board of the International Free Press Society, and has been described as a part of the counter-jihad movement.

On July 19, 2011, West sent an email to Democratic representative and Democratic National Committee chairwoman Debbie Wasserman Schultz in response to comments directed at him in a speech the congresswoman made on the floor of the House of Representatives after West had departed the chamber. West's email, which he copied to members of House Democratic and Republican leadership, characterized Wasserman as "the most vile, unprofessional, and despicable member of the US House of Representatives", said that she was "not a lady" and asked that she focus, instead, on her own congressional district. This is a long-standing dispute that West says "dates back to the disgusting protest you ordered at my campaign headquarters, October 2010 in Deerfield Beach".

At a town hall meeting in Palm City, Florida on April 11, 2012, West was asked by a man in the audience, "What percentage of the American legislature do you think are card carrying Marxists or International Socialists?" West responded that "there's about 78 to 81 members of the Democratic Party that are members of the Communist Party." When asked to name them, he replied "It's called the Congressional Progressive Caucus."

=== Committee assignments ===
West was appointed to the House Armed Services Committee and the Small Business Committee.

- Committee on Armed Services
  - Subcommittee on Emerging Threats and Capabilities
- Committee on Small Business
  - Subcommittee on Contracting and Workforce
  - Subcommittee on Investigations, Oversight and Regulations

=== Caucus memberships ===
- Republican Study Committee
- Tea Party Caucus
- Congressional Black Caucus

When West joined the Congressional Black Caucus (CBC) on January 5, 2011, he became the first Republican to join the CBC since former Congressman Gary Franks of Connecticut retired in 1997.

== Post-congressional career (2013–present) ==
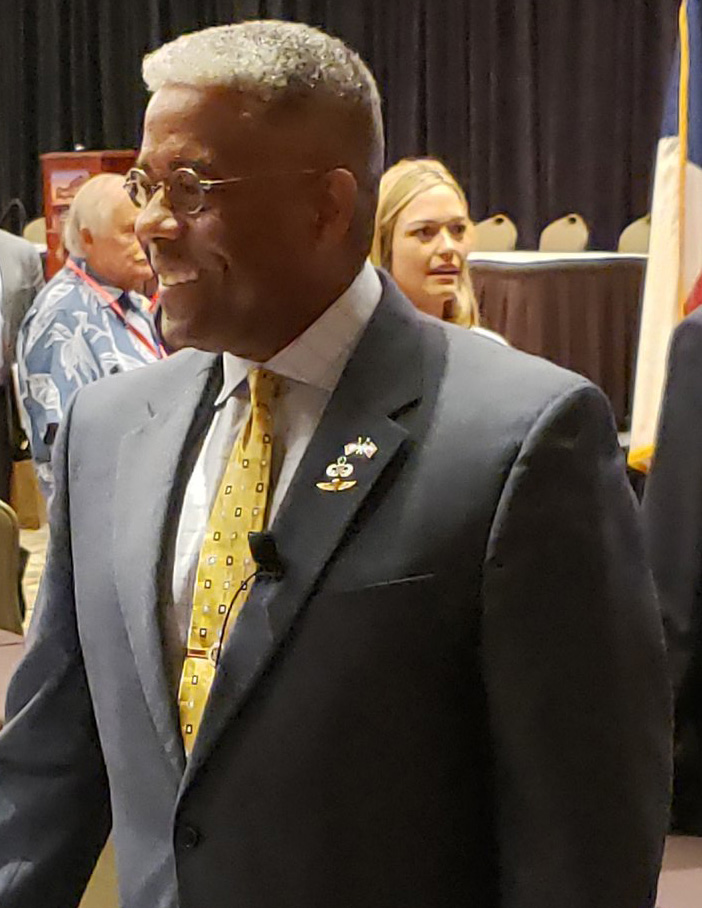
Allen West at the National Pachyderm Convention in Galveston, Texas on September 7, 2019.

In January 2013, West was hired as a full-time director of programming for Next Generation.TV, part of PJ Media; in mid-September 2013 his role changed to a twice-a-month contributor. On May 16, 2013, Fox News announced it had hired West as a contributor to offer political commentary during the network's daytime and prime time shows.

Following the Charleston church shooting in June 2015, South Carolina Governor Nikki Haley called for the Confederate Battle flag to be removed from a memorial outside the state capital. West referred to the debate over the flag as a "manufactured crisis" invented by liberals to distract from black-on-black violence.

In September 2015, West was nominated to the Sunset Advisory Commission, which oversees the need for Texas state agencies, as the Texas Senate's appointed public member.

West is a Life and Endowment Member of the National Rifle Association of America (NRA). In May 2016, he announced that he had been elected as a member of the NRA Board of Directors for a three-year term.

On December 9, 2016, West's official Facebook page posted that Trump had selected James Mattis as Secretary of Defense to exterminate Muslims. Michele Hickford, the editor-in-chief of West's website, removed the post, apologized to readers, claimed she did not post it, took responsibility as editor-in-chief, and stated West had no part in the post.

West was an Executive Director of the National Center for Policy Analysis, a free-market public policy research organization, from July 2016 until it ceased operations in mid-2017.

== Chairman of the Texas Republican Party ==
In July 2019, West announced that he would run for Chairman of the Republican Party of Texas, challenging the incumbent chair, James Dickey. Among the issues he ran on, West stated he wanted to "strengthen our families," "stand up for life," and secure the U.S.–Mexico border. He also stated that House Speaker Dennis Bonnen should resign. West was endorsed by former state party chairs Tom Mechler and Cathie Adams and former vice-chair David Barton. He was elected chair in the early morning hours of July 20, 2020. The chairman position was voted on at the Texas state Republican convention, where West won 22 of the Texas’s 31 Senate district caucuses, with Dickey winning only 9 of the caucuses.

Shortly after West's election the party adopted the slogan "We are the storm", a phrase also used by believers in the QAnon conspiracy theory, which West characterized as a quotation from a poem which he declined to identify. On December 11, 2020, after the Supreme Court of the United States rejected Texas's attempt to invalidate election results from four states, West said "Perhaps law-abiding states should bond together and form a Union of states that will abide by the Constitution." Some observers interpreted this as an encouragement of secession from the United States.

On June 4, 2021, he announced he would resign effective July 11, 2021.

== Texas gubernatorial campaign ==
On July 4, 2021, West announced that he would challenge incumbent Greg Abbott for the Republican nomination for Governor of Texas in 2022. West was defeated in the Republican primary on March 1, 2022 with 12% of the vote.

== Chairman of the Dallas County Republican Party ==
On March 5, 2024, West was elected as the chairman of the Dallas County Republican Party, beating the incumbent chair with slightly over 70% of the vote. Since taking office as chair, he has attempted to get an audit of the Dallas County electoral process underway. He has also suggested that there should be increased surveillance at polling places within the county. West resigned from this position on April 15, 2026.

== Personal life ==
West married Angela M. Graham on December 24, 1989. She holds a Ph.D. in education from Kansas State University, and received a gubernatorial appointment to the board of trustees of Florida Atlantic University. They have two daughters. West and his family moved to Garland, Texas after he became CEO of the Dallas-based National Center for Policy Analysis in January 2015. West identifies as a Christian.

West is a certified master scuba diver, motorcycle enthusiast, and honorary member of the Blue Knights International Law Enforcement Motorcycle Club. He was a co-host for Troopathon 2013.

On May 23, 2020, while participating in a protest against lockdowns during the COVID-19 pandemic, West was involved in a motorcycle crash just outside Waco, Texas. He was airlifted to the hospital, and his social-media team announced that he was in "stable condition."

On August 20, 2021, West’s wife, Angela West, was arrested for DWI with her grandchild in the vehicle. George R. Milner released a statement that the Dallas County District Attorney’s Office will not file charges against Angela after "thoroughly" reviewing all evidence. He added that the toxicology report proved that there was no alcohol in her blood, as well as no drugs in her system. The district attorney’s office confirmed that the charge had been dropped, releasing the following statement: "This office rejected the case after reviewing the toxicology results which showed conclusively that there were no drugs or alcohol in Ms. West’s system at the time of the drawing of her blood."

In October 2021, West was diagnosed with COVID-19, with an x-ray showing pneumonia; he self-treated with ivermectin and hydroxychloroquine. West, who was not vaccinated against COVID-19, was hospitalized and received monoclonal antibody injections. He was subsequently released from the hospital and continued to criticize COVID-19 vaccination programs.

== Electoral history ==
2008 Florida's 22nd congressional district election
Party	Candidate	Votes	%
Democratic	Ron Klein (incumbent)	169,041	54.7
Republican	Allen West	140,104	45.3
Total votes		309,145	100.0
Democratic hold			

2010 Florida's 22nd congressional district election
Party	Candidate	Votes	%
Republican	Allen West	115,411	54.3
Democratic	Ron Klein (incumbent)	97,051	45.7
Total votes		212,462	100.0
Republican gain from Democratic			

2012 Florida's 18th congressional district election
Party	Candidate	Votes	%
Democratic	Patrick Murphy	166,799	50.4
Republican	Allen West (incumbent)	164,370	49.6
Total votes		331,169	100.0
Democratic gain from Republican			

== See also ==
- List of African-American Republicans
- List of African-American United States representatives

== Published works ==
- West, Allen; Hickford, Michele (2014). Guardian of the Republic: An American Ronin's Journey to Faith, Family and Freedom. Crown Forum. ISBN 978-0804138109.
- West, Allen (2018). Hold Texas, Hold the Nation: Victory or Death. Brown Books Publishing Group. ISBN 978-1612542980.

U.S. House of Representatives
Preceded by Ron Klein	Member of the U.S. House of Representatives from Florida's 22nd congressional district 2011–2013	Succeeded by Lois Frankel
Party political offices
Preceded by James Dickey	Chair of the Texas Republican Party; 2020–2021	Succeeded by Matt Rinaldi
U.S. order of precedence (ceremonial)
Preceded by David Rivera as Former U.S. Representative	Order of precedence of the United States as Former U.S. Representative	Succeeded by Joe Garcia as Former U.S. Representative
