= Forensic facial reconstruction =

Recreating faces from skeletal remains

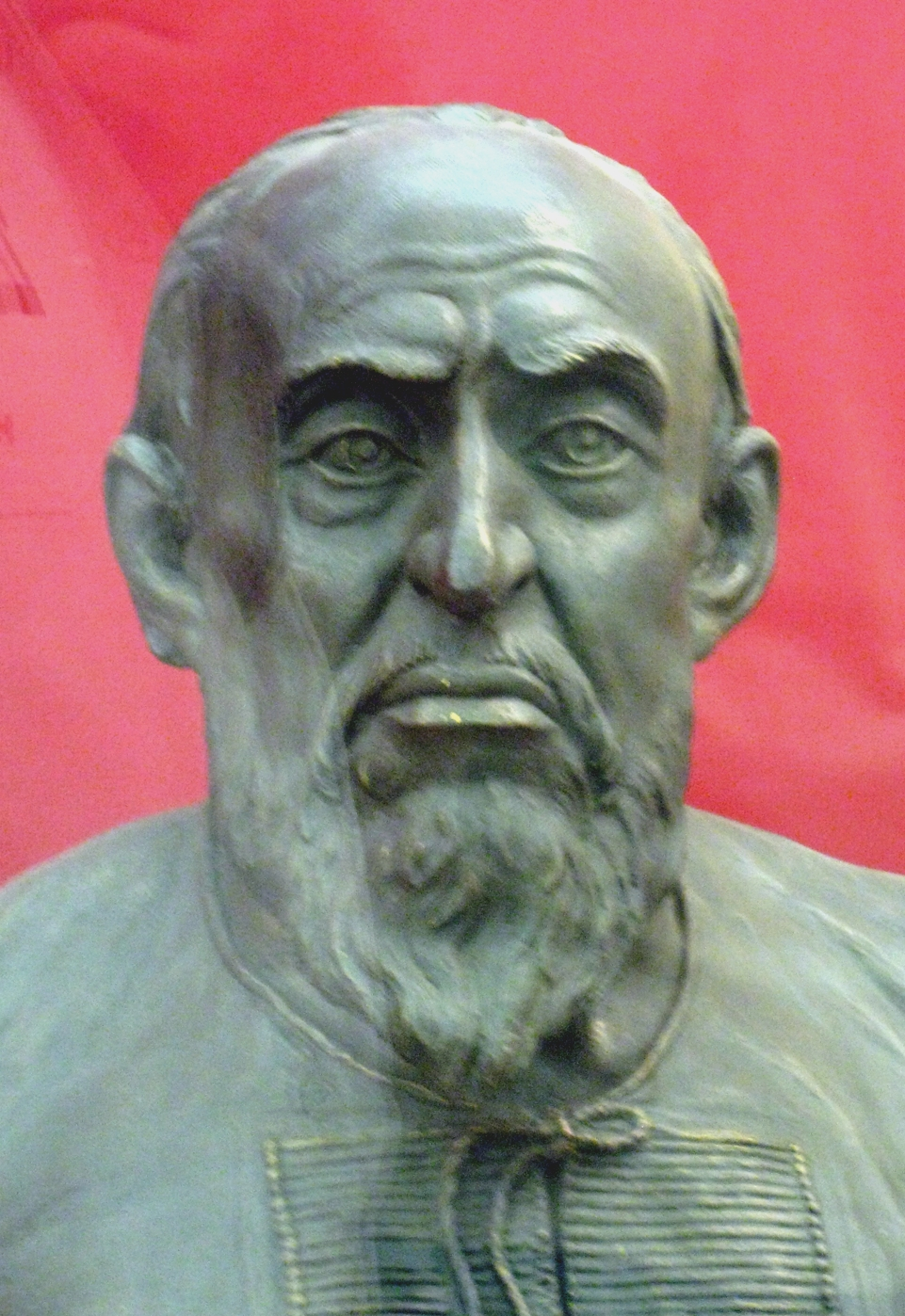
Reconstruction of Tsar Ivan the Terrible of Russia by Mikhail Gerasimov, the Soviet archaeologist and anthropologist who developed the first technique of forensic sculpture (1965)

Forensic facial reconstruction (or forensic facial approximation) is the process of recreating the face of an individual (whose identity is often not known) from their skeletal remains, combining artistic skill with anthropology, osteology and anatomy. It is among the most subjective and most disputed techniques in forensic anthropology. Even so, reconstructions have led to enough identifications to sustain research into the method.

Besides the identification of unidentified decedents, facial reconstructions are made for remains of historical value and for those of prehistoric hominids and humans.

== Types of identification ==
Forensic identification in forensic anthropology takes two forms, circumstantial and positive.

- Circumstantial identification is established when an individual fits the biological profile of a set of skeletal or largely skeletal remains. It does not prove identity, because many individuals may fit the same biological description.
- Positive identification, one of the main goals of forensic science, is established when a unique set of biological characteristics is matched to a set of skeletal remains. It requires the remains to correspond with medical or dental records, unique ante mortem wounds or pathologies, DNA analysis or other evidence.

When every other method has failed, facial reconstruction gives investigators and families a further avenue in cases involving unidentified remains, and approximations have often prompted the information that led to a positive identification.

== Legal admissibility ==
In the United States, the Daubert standard, set by the Supreme Court in 1993, governs the admissibility of expert witness testimony. It requires such testimony to rest on sufficient facts or data and on reliable principles and methods. When several forensic artists work from the same skull, no two reconstructions are identical, and the data behind them are largely incomplete. For that reason facial reconstruction is not treated as a legally recognized method of positive identification and is not generally admitted as expert testimony; reconstructions are used only to support identification by verified methods.

== Types of reconstructions ==
=== Two-dimensional reconstructions ===
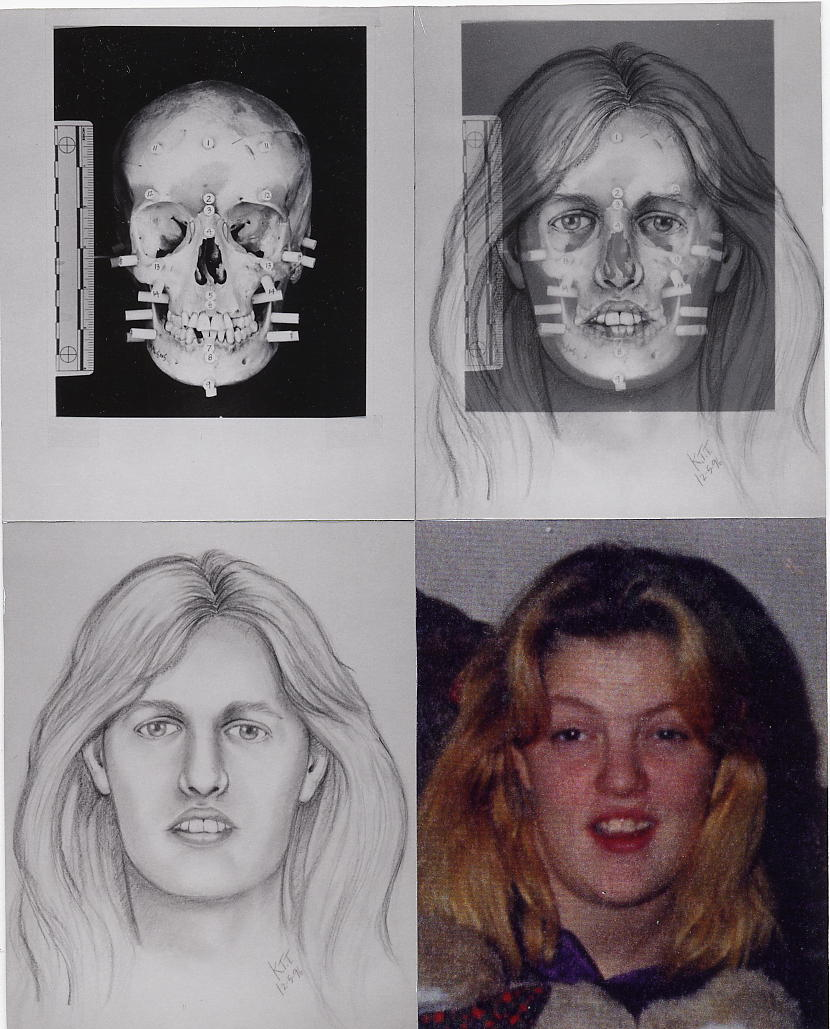
An example of a 2D facial reconstruction conducted by forensic artist Karen T. Taylor, and the subsequent identification, April Dawn Lacy.

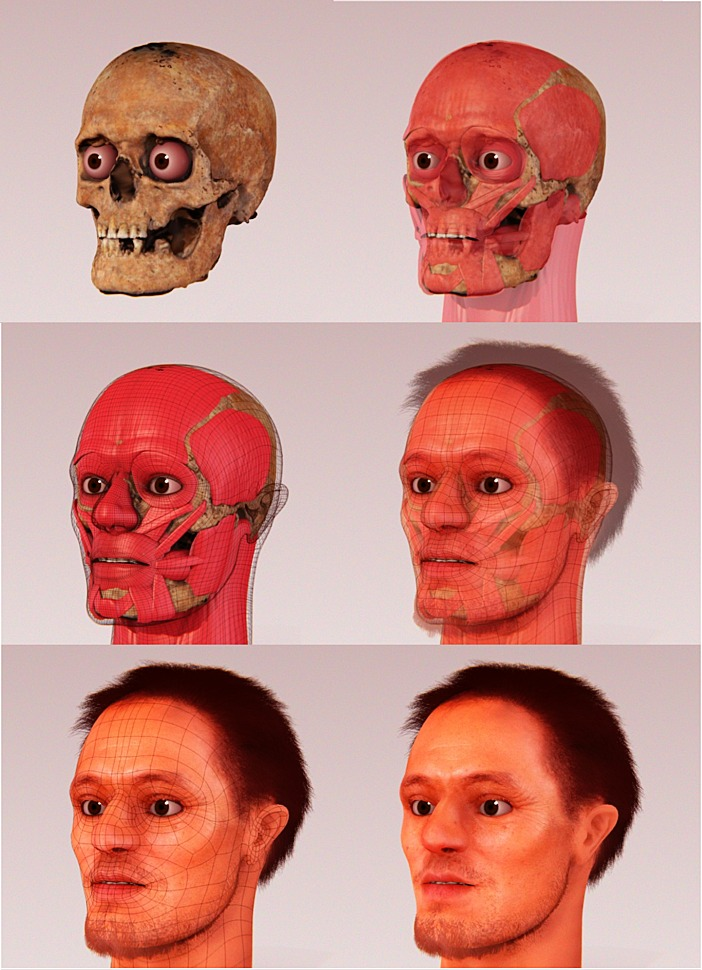
Forensic facial reconstruction of Alberto di Trento by Arc-Team and the 3D artist Cicero Moraes

Two-dimensional reconstructions are based on ante mortem photographs and the skull. Skull radiographs are sometimes used, but many cranial structures cannot be seen in them or are not at the correct scale. The work usually requires an artist and a forensic anthropologist working together. A common method was pioneered by Karen T. Taylor of Austin, Texas, in the 1980s. Taylor's method fixes tissue-depth markers to an unidentified skull at anthropological landmarks and photographs it; full-size frontal and lateral prints are then used as the base for a drawing on transparent vellum. Computer programs such as F.A.C.E. and C.A.R.E.S. produce two-dimensional approximations quickly and allow the drawing to be edited, which can shorten the process, though the results are often more generic than a hand-drawn portrait.

=== Three-dimensional reconstructions ===
Three-dimensional reconstructions are either sculptures, built up in modeling clay over a cast of the cranial remains, or high-resolution three-dimensional computer images. Like two-dimensional work, three-dimensional reconstruction usually needs both an artist and a forensic anthropologist. Computer programs build these images by manipulating scans of the cranial remains, stock photographs of facial features and other reconstructions; the results tend to look less artificial than a photograph of a clay model. The National Center for Missing & Exploited Children regularly issues computer reconstructions of unidentified decedents to the public in the hope of identifying them.

=== Superimposition ===
Superimposition is sometimes counted among the methods of facial reconstruction, though not always, because the investigator must already have some idea who the remains belong to, whereas two- and three-dimensional reconstructions are made when the identity is unknown. A forensic superimposition places a photograph of the suspected person over an X-ray of the unidentified skull; if the two are of the same individual, the facial features should line up.

=== Methods of reconstruction ===
Versions of craniofacial reconstruction have been used in several disciplines since the technique was developed. Forensic specialists use the facial musculature and its attachments to the skull to suggest what a victim looked like. This requires attention to the appearance of the skull, to any soft tissue still attached and to scans of the remains such as X-rays, CT scans and ultrasound. Three approaches have since been named after the schools that developed them: the Russian, American and Manchester methods.

The Russian method models the musculature of the skull in a clay-like material, working from where the muscles attach to bone. The American method instead works from the soft tissue that lies over the skull, using tissue-depth data recorded from other remains or from living people, measured with tissue markers or ultrasound. The two approaches suit different combinations of sex, age and ancestry. The Manchester method, the most widely used, combines them, using both the musculature and tissue-depth markers and landmarks.

== History ==
Hermann Welcker published the first measurements of facial tissue depth in 1883, and Wilhelm His Sr. made the first scientific facial reconstruction in 1895, building the face of Johann Sebastian Bach over a cast of his skull. Kollmann and Buchly later extended the tissue-depth data, and their tables remain in use in many laboratories.

Facial reconstruction grew out of two of the four main subfields of anthropology. In biological anthropology it was used to approximate the appearance of early hominid forms, and in archaeology to check the identity of historic figures. In 1936 Rose Koller, of the Natural History Museum in Vienna, led a team of sculptors in recreating the likenesses of "ancient Austrians" from their skulls. Mikhail Gerasimov made his first reconstructions of a prehistoric Neanderthal and of Java Man in 1927; they are displayed in the museum at Irkutsk. Working from elaborate measurements and anatomical study, he built faces that people could recognize, sometimes including a typical expression. A decade of study passed before he reached portrait quality, though his first public work of this kind dates from 1930, the face of Maria Dostoyevskaya, mother of Fyodor Dostoevsky. Gerasimov also used paleoanthropological reconstruction to estimate the appearance of ancient peoples.

In 1932 he moved to Leningrad for postgraduate study, where he experimented with skulls to see whether faces could be reconstructed by racial type. Between 1937 and 1939 he reconstructed three faces from skulls held by the Academy of Sciences of the Soviet Union – a Papuan, a Kazakh and a Khevsur – and carried out numerous forensic reconstructions for the NKVD. He became widely known through his reconstructions of Yaroslav the Wise (1938) and Andrey Bogolyubsky (1939).

Gerasimov set out his method in Основы восстановления лица по черепу (Basics of Facial Reconstruction from the Skull, 1949) and again in Восстановление лица по черепу (Reconstruction of the Face from the Skull, 1955). His students later applied the techniques to criminal cases, and Wilton M. Krogman did much to popularize facial reconstruction in the forensic field, setting out his method for approximation in a 1962 book. Others who helped popularize three-dimensional reconstruction include Cherry (1977), Angel (1977), Gatliff (1984), Snow (1979) and Iscan (1986).

Anthropological data were also used in 1991 to reconstruct the head of Mozart; the bust was unveiled at the Salon du Son in Paris that year.

In 2003–04 the Canadian artist Christian Corbet reconstructed the face of the Sulman mummy, a roughly 2,200-year-old Egyptian mummy in the Chatham-Kent Museum, working from CT and laser scans with Andrew Nelson of the anthropology department at the University of Western Ontario. The team believed it was the first reconstruction of a mummy made without unwrapping the body.

== Technique for creating a three-dimensional clay reconstruction ==
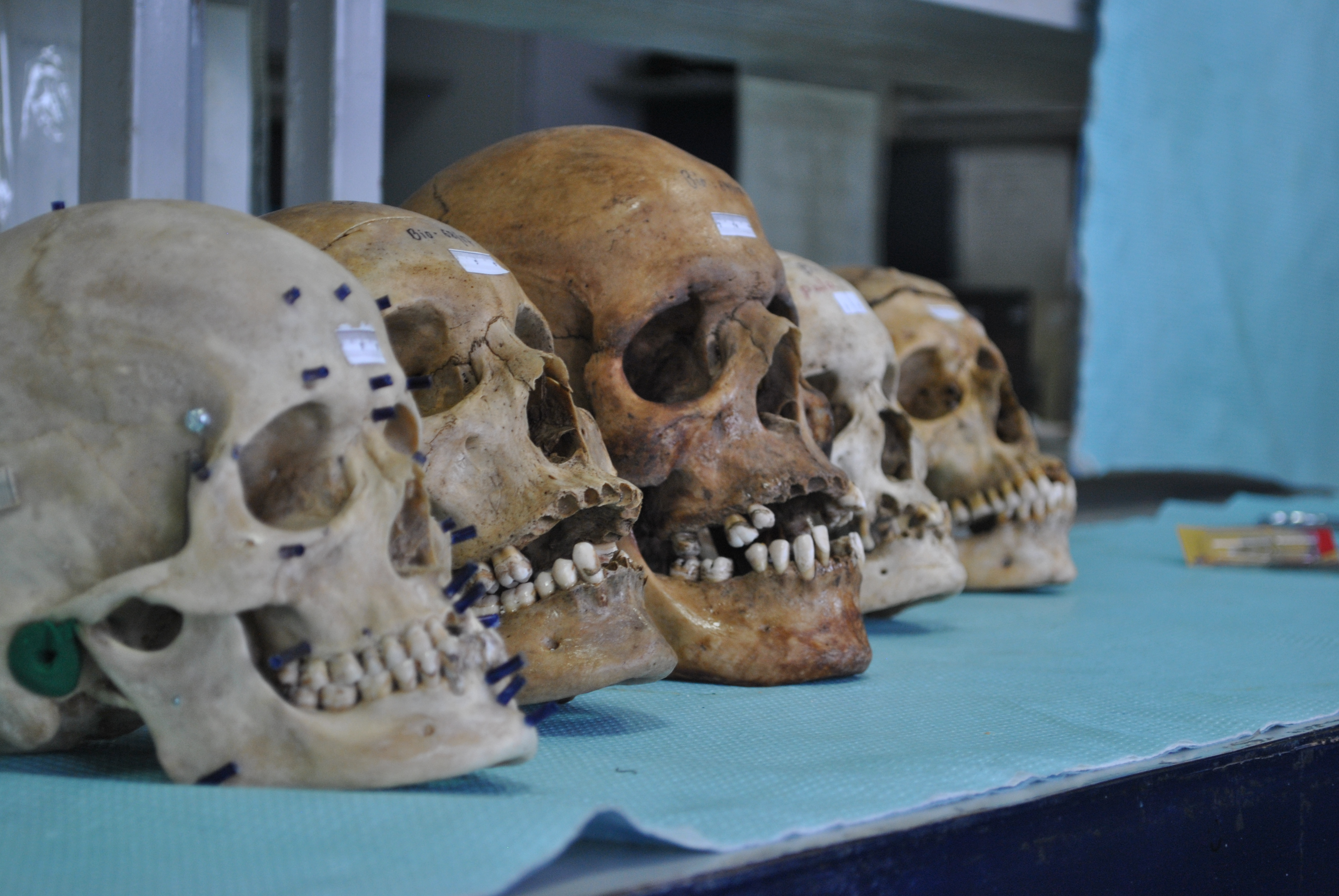
Skulls for facial approximation

No single method of building a three-dimensional reconstruction has been agreed, and several are in use. The process below follows the method set out by Taylor and Angel in Craniofacial Identification in Forensic Medicine, pp. 177–185. It assumes that the sex, age and ancestry of the remains have already been established by standard forensic anthropological methods.

The skull is the basis of a reconstruction, but other remains can be valuable. When fragments of soft tissue survive, close inspection lets the artist estimate tissue thickness over the rest of the skull, which removes one of the hardest parts of the task. Personal effects found with the remains, such as jewelry, hair or glasses, matter in the final stages because they show directly how the person appeared.

Steps of forensic facial reconstruction of a mummy

Usually, though, the artist receives a bare skull with little or no soft tissue. The skull is then examined for bony pathologies and unusual landmarks, the ruggedness of muscle attachments, the profile of the jaw, the symmetry of the nasal bones, the dentition and the wear on the occlusal surfaces, all of which affect the appearance of the face.

The skull is then cleaned and damaged or fragmented areas are repaired with wax. The jaw is reattached with wax, aligned by the teeth or, where teeth are missing, by averaging the vertical distance between the mandible and maxilla. Undercuts such as the nasal opening are filled with modeling clay, and prosthetic eyes are set in the orbits, centered between the upper and lower orbital rims. A plaster cast of the skull is then made.

Once the cast has set, colored plastic or the colored ends of safety matches are fixed at 21 landmark points matching the reference data, each representing the average facial tissue thickness for a person of the same sex, ancestry and age as the remains. From here every feature is added in modeling clay.

The facial muscles are layered on in order: temporalis, masseter, buccinator and occipitofrontalis, then the soft tissues of the neck. The nose and lips are reconstructed before the remaining muscles. The lips are about as wide as the interpupillary distance, though that varies with age, sex, ancestry and occlusion. The nose is among the hardest features to reconstruct, because so little of the underlying bone constrains its shape. The nasal profile is set by measuring the width of the nasal aperture and the nasal spine; three times the length of the spine plus the depth of tissue marker five gives the approximate nose length. The pitch of the nose follows the direction of the nasal spine, which may point down, straight or up. A block of clay of the right length is placed on the nasal spine and the tissue filled in using markers two and three as a guide to the bridge. The alae are marked five millimeters below the bottom of the nasal aperture, built as small egg-shaped balls of clay five millimeters across and blended into the nose.

The muscles of facial expression and the soft tissue around the eyes come next, with further measurements adjusted for ancestry, including the eye folds common in people of Asian descent. The tissues are then built up to within a millimeter of the markers and the ears, which are difficult to reproduce, are added. Finally the face is "fleshed": clay is built up until the markers are covered and individual features such as hair, wrinkles, glasses or distinguishing marks are added.

== Problems ==
Facial reconstruction faces several unresolved problems.

=== Insufficient tissue thickness data ===
Reconstruction and actual photograph of Green River victim Gail Mathews. The victim had distinctive lips, which could not be represented in the reconstruction, as her body was decomposed.

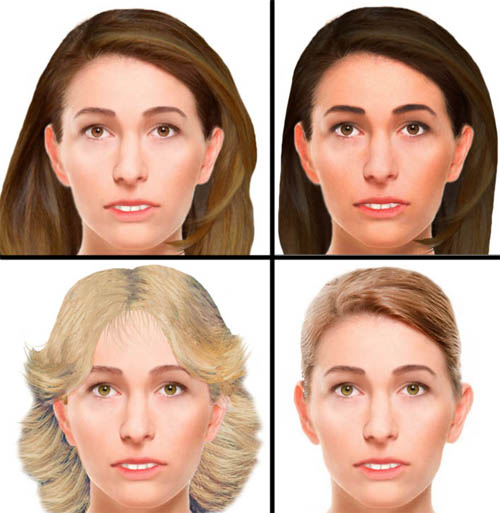
In many cases, the subject's hairstyle is unknown, which causes an artist to guess possible solutions, such as this unidentified woman found in Ontario, Canada.

The most pressing issue is the data used to average facial tissue thickness. The samples available to artists remain narrow in age, sex and build, which limits accuracy; until they are widened, the best possible reconstruction cannot be produced reliably.

=== Lack of methodological standardization ===
A second problem is the absence of agreed standards for approximating facial features. No single official method has been recognized, which is a particular weakness for the eyes, the nose and individuating traits such as hairstyle; these are the features witnesses are most likely to remember. Research on computer-assisted methods, including automated and AI-based systems, may reduce these limits.

=== Subjectivity ===
Because artistic choices enter at every stage, a reconstruction shows only the kind of face a person may have had. Soft tissue is approximated from osteological measurements, so identifying characteristics can be missed. The position and general shape of the main features are usually accurate, being largely set by the skull.

== Neolithic dog ==
The technique has also been applied to animals. In 2019 the forensic artist Amy Thornton modeled the head of a Neolithic dog from Cuween Hill Chambered Cairn in Orkney, working from a CT scan of one of the 24 canine skulls found at the site, taken at the Royal (Dick) School of Veterinary Studies and printed in 3D. Alison Sheridan of National Museums Scotland said the animal was the size of a large collie and resembled a European gray wolf, and that the team knew of no earlier attempt to reconstruct an animal from the period forensically.
