= Karen T. Taylor =

American forensic and portrait artist (born 1952)

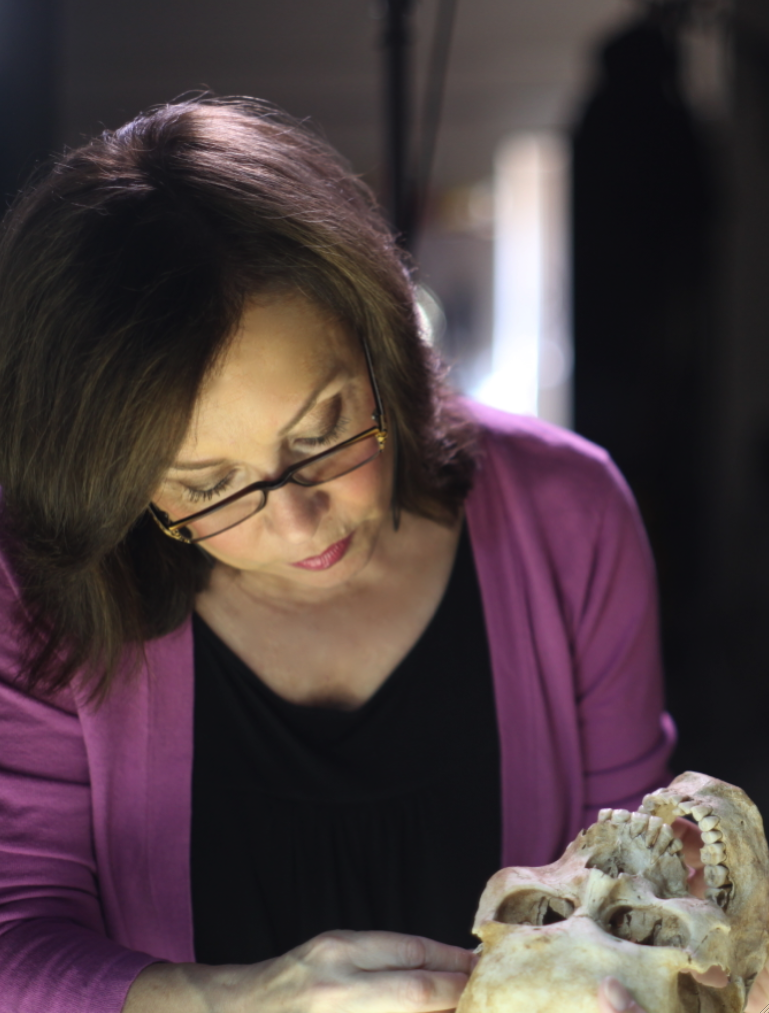
- Taylor on the television set of The Decrypters, Spring 2012
- Born: March 6, 1952 (age 74); Fort Worth, Texas, U.S.
- Occupations: Forensic Artist; Portrait Sculptor; Facial Identification Specialist; Art Educator and Author
- Website: Karen T. Taylor: Facial Images

Karen T. Taylor (born March 6, 1952) is an American forensic and portrait artist who has worked to help resolve criminal cases for a variety of law enforcement agencies throughout the world. Her primary expertise includes composite imagery, child and adult age progression, postmortem drawing and forensic facial reconstruction. In the mid-1980s, Taylor pioneered the method of 2-dimensional facial reconstruction, by drawing facial features over frontal and lateral skull photographs based on anthropological data. Taylor is also well-established as a forensic art educator, fine art portrait sculptor, and specialist in the human face.

== Background ==
Taylor, a native of Fort Worth, Texas, developed an early aptitude for drawing and sculpting faces. She attended R. L. Paschal High School, the University of Texas School of Fine Arts in Austin and the Chelsea School of Fine Art in London. While in England, she worked as a portrait sculptor for Madame Tussaud's Wax Museum. Taylor returned to Texas and spent over 18 years as the Texas Department of Public Safety's first full-time forensic artist.

Taylor was a forensic art instructor for over twenty years at the FBI Academy in Quantico, Virginia (through the fall of 2006) and other law enforcement academies, universities, art and medical schools internationally. She also conducts face-related training workshops for fine artists and specializes in highly accurate and subtly expressive portraits in bronze.

Taylor now lives in the Austin, Texas area.

== Special recognition ==
Director's Citation

In October, 1997 Texas Department of Public Safety, Colonel Dudley M. Thomas honored Taylor with a "Director's Citation" for service beyond the normal course of duty, "performing the difficult task of identifying victims and assisting in bringing dangerous criminals to justice". Director Thomas recognized her "professionalism, ambition, and talent which advanced her status as a forensic artist to a position that leads the nation in providing a variety of forensic art techniques and services". The award made particular note of Taylor's ingenuity and initiative which led to the development of the 2-dimensional facial reconstruction technique that "has been recognized internationally, revolutionizing skull-to-face reconstruction and making an invaluable contribution to the Department, law enforcement and anthropological research."

Colonel Thomas cited Karen's "expertise, diligence and dedication in the performance of her duties" as "reflecting great credit upon her, the profession of law enforcement and the Texas Department of Public Safety".

Texas Women of the Century

After years of success as a forensic artist, helping capture criminals and identify their victims, Taylor was named one of the "Texas Women of the Century" in 1999, a tribute to the 100 most influential Texas women of the past century. The twenty four collaborating organizations of the Women of the Century Project described her as "the premier forensic artist in the world". Taylor shared the honor with fellow recipients, Barbara Bush, Dale Evans, Senator Kay Bailey Hutchison, Lady Bird Johnson, Barbara Jordon, Justice Sandra Day O'Connor, Governor Ann Richards, Mary Kay Ash, Elisabet Ney and others.

Dondero Award

In 2002, she was the first woman to receive the "Dondero Award" from the International Association for Identification for her "outstanding contribution in the field of scientific identification". Previous Dondero Award recipients include J. Edgar Hoover and Dr. Henry Lee.

== Portrait sculpture ==
After years of artistically depicting "Bad Guys" and their victims, Taylor now focuses on honoring the "Good Guys" with a series of bronzes which commemorate various individuals who have made a significant contribution to society. Taylor's bronze sculpture of forensic scientist George Taft is displayed at the Alaska State Troopers Museum in Anchorage, Alaska. Taft's sculpture was the first in the series of Taylor's "Good Guys."

A portrait sculpture of Barbara Benton (wife of Thomas Hart Benton V) resides in the International Headquarters of the Order of the Eastern Star in the Embassy Row area of Washington, D.C.

== Consultant work ==
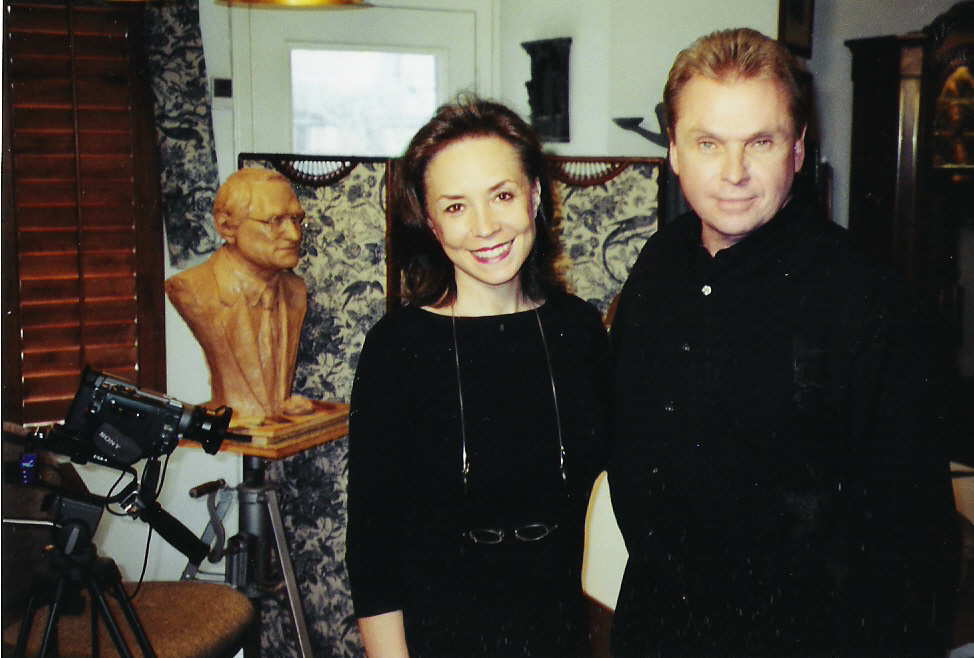
Taylor filming an episode of America's Most Wanted with correspondent Ed Miller

Beginning in 1990, Taylor was a contributor to America's Most Wanted on FOX, and remained so until the show's cancellation. One unidentified deceased case, done for the Chicago Police Department and AMW, could be seen on the show's website. Taylor's reconstruction of the young murdered girl led to her identification.

Taylor's work has also been featured on ABC, NBC, CBS, CNN, Court TV, the Discovery Channel, the History Channel, Telemundo and the BBC. CBS drama CSI: Crime Scene Investigation created a forensic artist character based on Taylor and her artwork and hands have appeared on both the Las Vegas-based and New York-based shows. Taylor served as a "real life" consultant to museum exhibit "CSI: the Experience", a traveling interactive exhibition developed by the Fort Worth Museum of Science and History. Taylor has also contributed to the popular program Bones on FOX.

Taylor did a “facial reconstruction” prop sculpture that was used on Body of Proof on ABC on the episode called “Occupational Hazards” written by Corey Miller and produced by Matthew Gross. Actress Jeri Ryan was coached by Taylor in sculptural hand movements so that Ryan's character realistically portrayed a forensic sculptor.

In collaboration with Dr. Nancy Etcoff, professor of neuropsychology at Harvard Medical School, Taylor developed a generalized universal template for idealized feminine beauty. Taylor's drawings aired on Discover Channel feature Survival of the Prettiest, based on Etcoff's book by the same name. More recently, this work has been broadcast on Discovery's How Stuff Works, in a segment called "Prescribing Beauty: Faces and Perceptions of Perfection".

Taylor's resolved forensic identification cases have been profiled on various reality-based crime shows. The New Detectives featured Taylor and her work in episodes "Faces of Tragedy", "Cold Cases" and "Drawing Conclusions". Forensic Files has interviewed Taylor and shown her work in episodes entitled "Headquarters" and "Saving Face".

Taylor has also created numerous reconstructions of unidentified murder victims, including April Lacy, "Orange Socks" and the Walker County Jane Doe.

The FBI in Washington, D.C. commissioned Taylor to do an age progression sculpture of fugitive suspected family annihilator William Bradford Bishop. Bishop was added to the FBI's 10 Most Wanted List on April 10, 2014.

== Historical projects ==
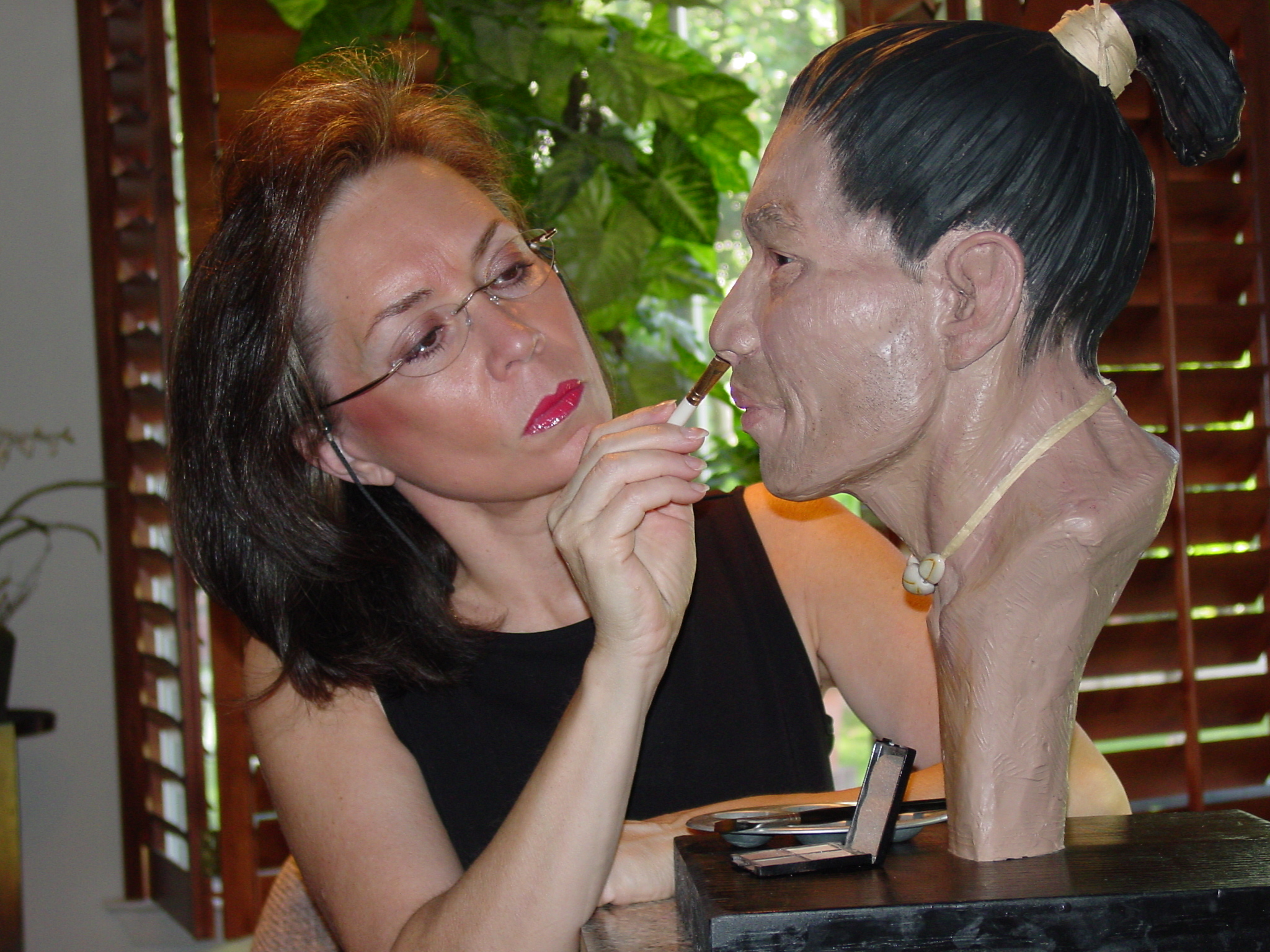
Taylor working on the reconstructed Bo Man from Southern China

Taylor has been involved in a variety of special art projects, particularly those of historical significance, which utilize modern forensic art identification techniques in a historical context. She created the first sculpted facial reconstruction of one of the Bo people of southern China, based on an 800-year-old skull. The Bo interred their dead in mysterious hanging coffins suspended from sheer cliffs.

Using a skull casting, Taylor also revealed, for the first time, the sculpted face of the Red Queen of Palenque, a Mayan queen who lived 1000 years ago. Teamed with a bioarchaeologist, Taylor's work on this historical case is documented in a video entitled "Mesoamerica: Forensic Artist Gives the Red Queen a Face".

Premiering in 2012, Taylor acted as part of the "Texas Team" for the television series The Decrypters, produced by Shine Television of London. In the US, the show aired on the National Geographic Channel. For each episode, the team, primarily composed of anthropologists from the Forensic Anthropology Center at Texas State University (FACTS), examined historically interesting skeletal cases using modern investigative methods. Taylor's task was to assess the various skulls and artistically determine how the individual would have appeared in life.

In early 2012, members of the Dubuque County Historical Society and curators at the National Mississippi River Museum asked Taylor to create a 2D facial reconstruction based on the skull of Julien Dubuque, founder of Dubuque, Iowa. Taylor was able to produce a reconstruction using photos of Dubuque's skull taken in 1887.

== Publications ==
Taylor authored the in-depth textbook, Forensic Art and Illustration, CRC Press, Boca Raton, London, New York, Washington DC, 2001.

Taylor was featured in American Artist Drawing magazine, Summer 2006 in an article titled, "Understanding Faces from the Inside Out" by Edith Zimmerman.
