= James Dickey (Texas politician) =

American businessperson and politician (born 1966)

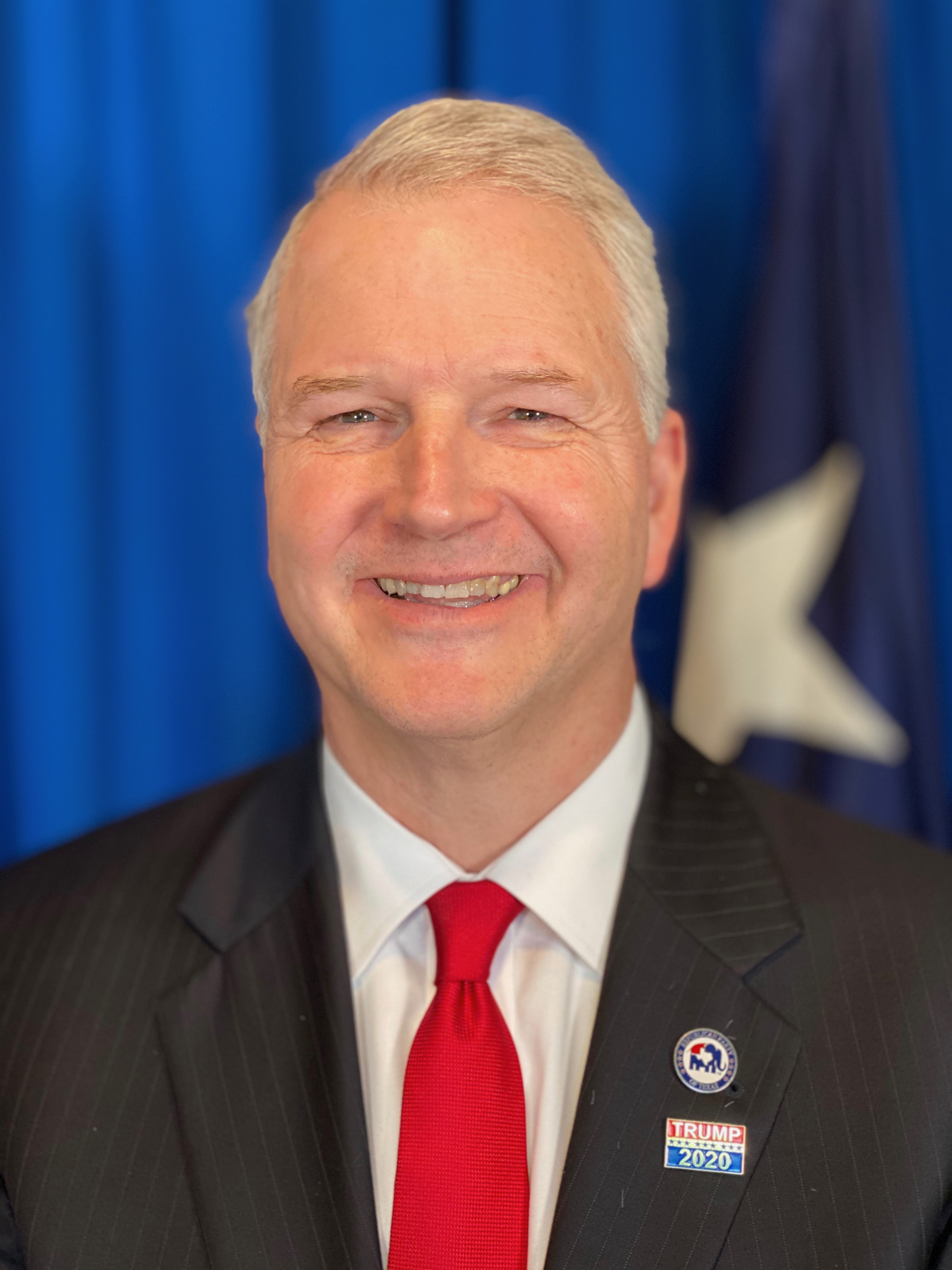

Chair of the Texas Republican Party
- In office June 3, 2017 – July 20, 2020
- Preceded by: Tom Mechler
- Succeeded by: Allen West

Personal details
- Born: James Roy Dickey; November 23, 1966 (age 59)
- Party: Republican
- Spouse: Lynda Dickey (1989–present)
- Children: 3
- Education: Stanford University (BA); Baylor University (MBA)
- Website: jdkey.com

James Roy Dickey (born November 23, 1966) is an American government relations executive, political strategist, and former chairman of the Republican Party of Texas. He was elected by the 64-member Republican State Executive Committee meeting in Austin on June 3, 2017, and re-elected at the state convention on June 15, 2018. In his third campaign he was defeated by Allen West on July 20, 2020. As state party chairman, he also served on the Republican National Committee (2017–2020), overseeing a voter registration initiative that registered over 223,000 new Republicans, including 87,900 in the final 90 days before the 2020 general election.

Dickey is the founder and principal of JD Key Consulting, an Austin-based government relations firm providing strategic advisory and regulatory compliance expertise to businesses in data centers, energy, banking, and manufacturing.

== Early life and education ==
Dickey moved to Texas with his family when he was in elementary school and attended Polytechnic High School in Fort Worth where he graduated valedictorian of his class. Dickey then attended Stanford University, where he received bachelor's degrees in Political Science and English and later Baylor University, where he received a Master of Business Administration.

== Career ==
=== Travis County Republican Party ===
On March 4, 2014, Dickey was elected Travis County Republican Party chairman, in an uncontested Republican primary. He succeeded Rosemary Edwards, who served in that position from 2008 until Dickey's election.

Dickey ran for reelection as Travis County chair in 2016, but he was defeated in the March 1, 2016 election, 26,619 to 20,543 (56.4% to 43.6%) by Robert Morrow. Travis County Republican Party leaders immediately wanted to remove Morrow because he would wear a court jester's hat to county party meetings, speculated on famous assassinations and conspiracy theories, and promoted his book on the Clintons he co-authored with Roger Stone. With Dickey's assistance they implemented a plan that turned over operations of the Party to an executive committee and other officers of the Party.

Morrow held the Travis County chairmanship from March 1 to September 20, 2016. Dickey was re-elected as the Travis County chair after Morrow was disqualified by filing to run for U.S. President against Donald Trump. After Morrow's removal, Dickey defeated, 62–26, the political consultant Brendan Steinhauser of Austin, who managed the successful John Cornyn Senate re-election campaign in 2014. Steinhauser said he could not say he would vote for Trump. Dickey made it clear that Trump was not his original choice but that it was the duty of the Party Chair to support nominees elected by the voters.

=== Texas Republican Party ===
On May 20, 2017, Tom Mechler of Amarillo, Texas announced his resignation, citing time constraints and business and family matters. Mechler set the election date for his successor less than two weeks later. Mechler's choice for party chair, Brenham, Texas wealth management executive Richard Scott "Rick" Figueroa, immediately announced his candidacy.

Dickey announced a few days later, and during the less than 10-day campaign Dickey and Figueroa participated in debates in Fort Worth, Houston, San Antonio, Round Rock, and Austin.

On June 3, 2017, the 62-member State Republican Executive Committee and the vice chair narrowly elected Dickey to succeed Mechler as state chair. Dickey received 32 votes to 31 for Rick Figueroa. Matt Mackowiak of Austin was elected to finish the one year remaining in Dickey's unexpired term as Travis County Republican Party Chairman.

Dickey ran for reelection in 2018 as Texas state party chair. He was opposed by Cindy Asche, a precinct chair in Collin County, Texas, north of Dallas. Asche loaned herself almost $200,000 to finance her campaign. On June 15, 2018, at the Republican Party of Texas convention in San Antonio, Dickey received the votes of 22 of the 31 Texas Senate districts. Asche of Frisco, Texas, a nurse and the chaplain for the Texas Federation of Republican Women, demanded that all of the delegates to the state convention vote on the state party chairman contest. Dickey won the vote of the full convention with 5,680 votes to Asche's 3,009 votes, 65.4% to 34.6%, growing Dickey's win to 24 of the 31 Senate districts. Asche ran a negative campaign focusing on the complaints of former state party employees and a 2004 Securities and Exchange Commission complaint against Dickey as a result of his past partnership at a hedge fund that lost $20 million in 2001 for the Art Institute of Chicago. The SEC filed a lawsuit alleging Dickey violated securities registration provisions, antifraud provisions, and broker-dealer registration provisions of the securities laws. The SEC settled the lawsuit with Dickey after he paid a fine without admitting guilt.

In July 2019, Dickey announced he would be running for reelection. He was challenged by former Congressman Allen West.

The state convention was originally scheduled for Houston in May 2020, but was postponed until mid-July to allow time for the county and Senate district conventions to be safely held and safeguards to be put in place.

After President Donald Trump proposed to move the 2020 Republican National Convention from North Carolina amid Coronavirus restrictions, Dickey volunteered Texas as a potential venue, saying, "Texans know how to and can safely have a big event like that as we reopen Texas." Dickey later mentioned Fort Worth, San Antonio, Dallas, and Houston as possible locations if the convention were hosted in Texas. The Republican National Committee ultimately decided to move its convention to Jacksonville, Florida.

On July 8, 2020, contrary to prior statements, Houston Mayor Sylvester Turner issued an order prohibiting the convention, scheduled for the following week. The next day the Party filed a lawsuit demanding specific performance of the lease between the state party and the Houston First, the management team of the Brown convention center. After the suit failed to achieve the restraining orders sought at both the Harris County district court and Texas Supreme Court, the convention had to be held virtually for the first time ever.

On July 20, 2020, during that virtual convention, he was defeated by Allen West, who won the vote in 22 of the 31 Senate districts.

During his three-year tenure as state chairman, Dickey oversaw a voter registration program that registered over 223,000 new Republicans, including 87,900 in the final 90 days before the 2020 general election—outpacing Texas Democrats in voter registration. He also recruited 3,862 Republican candidates for the 2018 primary elections.

In 2022 the 333rd District court in Harris County, Texas ruled in favor of Houston First Corporation in the lawsuit. On March 3, 2022, the Fourteenth Texas Courts of Appeals reversed and remanded the case, which the Republican Party of Texas ultimately won in a multiple-six-figure judgment.

=== Post-political career ===
Following his tenure as state party chairman, Dickey founded JD Key Consulting, an Austin-based government relations firm. The firm provides strategic advisory and regulatory compliance services to businesses in data centers, energy, banking, and manufacturing.

Dickey also hosts Winning On Issues, a podcast featuring interviews with Texas political leaders, policy experts, and elected officials on legislative strategy and public policy. Guests have included Texas Land Commissioner Dawn Buckingham and acting Comptroller Kelly Hancock.

== Media ==
Dickey is a frequent political commentator on Texas affairs, appearing on national and local television programs.

=== National television ===
- Fox & Friends (Fox News) – Discussed Texas hosting the 2020 Republican National Convention (May 2020)
- Washington Journal (C-SPAN) – Interviewed on Texas Republican politics during C-SPAN's 50 Capitals Tour (November 2, 2017)

=== Local television ===
Dickey regularly appears on FOX 7 Austin's political discussion segments, providing Republican perspective on Texas policy issues.

He also regularly appears on Spectrum News Austin's Capital Tonight program and has been interviewed by KXAN and KVUE news on multiple occasions.

=== Print and online media ===
Dickey has been quoted and profiled in major national and Texas publications including Newsweek, The Washington Times, NBC News, The Texas Tribune, Texas Monthly, Texas Observer, and Houston Chronicle.

== Private life ==
Dickey married his wife, Lynda, in 1989, and they live in Spicewood, Texas, in unincorporated Travis County, Texas in the Texas Hill Country. They have three children. The eldest is James Dickey, Jr., cofounder of Dickey Law Group in the Woodlands.

Party political offices
Preceded by Tom Mechler	Chair of the Texas Republican Party; 2017–2020	Succeeded by Allen West
