= Rose Koller =

Austrian sculptor

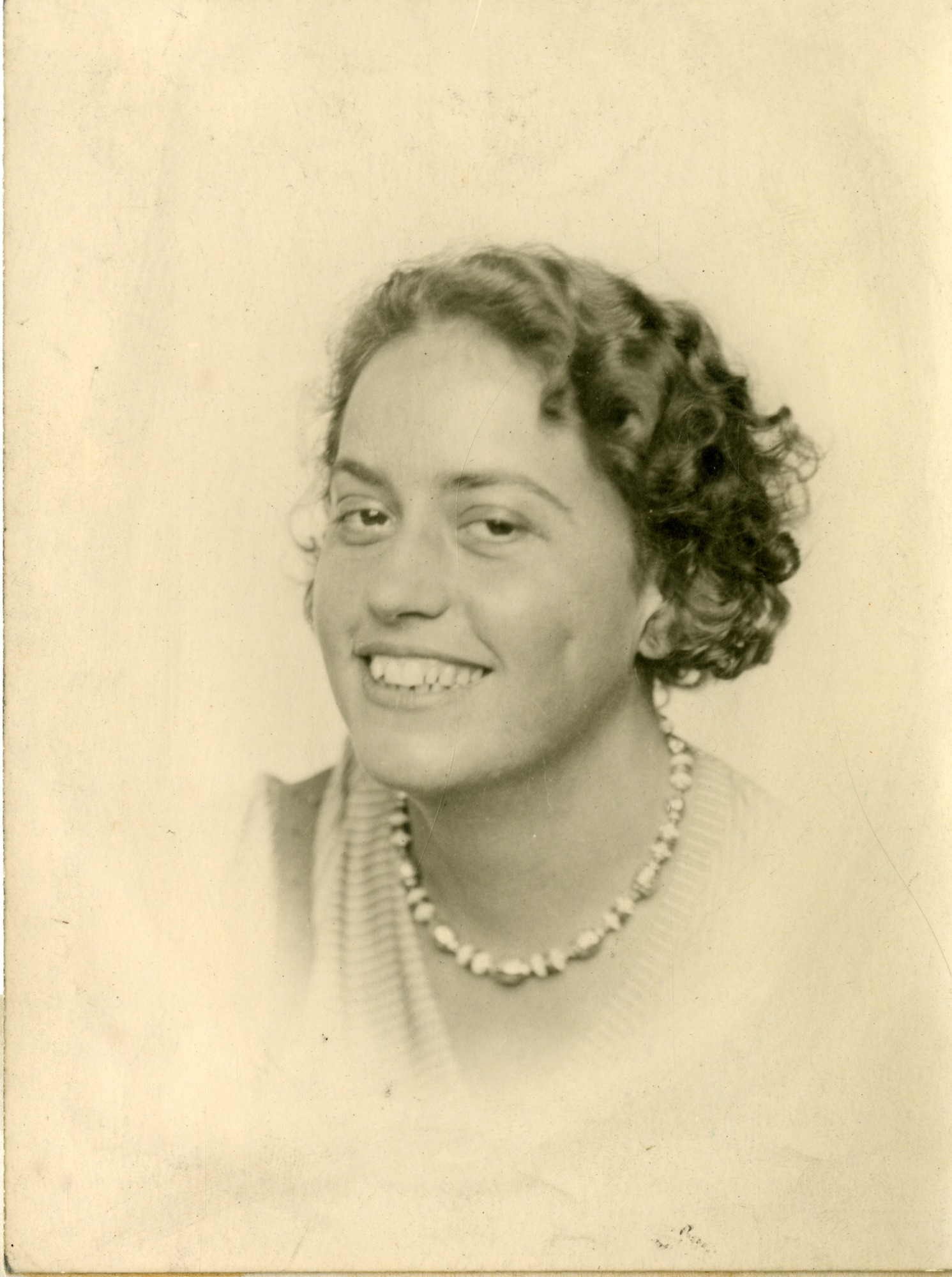
- Born: February 10, 1909
- Died: September 3, 2008 (aged 99)

Rose Koller (February 10, 1909 - September 3, 2008) was an Austrian sculptor.

Koller worked for the Natural History Museum in Vienna starting in 1933. In 1936, the Smithsonian's Anthropological Department commissioned a series of "family portrait-sculptures of ancient Austrians." Koller worked with a sculptor team. They used prehistoric skulls to model scientifically accurate heads for exhibition in an early example of forensic facial reconstruction.

Koller published a paper in 1935, Ein Beitrag zur Schädelkunde der Juden (Skull science of the Jews), which was a craniologic study of the Jewish population of Constantinople. She joined the NSDAP in 1938.

Koller worked for the Natural History Museum where she created a historical bust of St. Leopold which was exhibited at the 500th anniversary of his canonization.
