= The Shalom Show =

- Genre: Public affairs
- Created by: Richard Peritz
- Starring: Richard Peritz
- Country of origin: United States

Production
- Production companies: RCP Productions, Inc.

Original release
- Network: Syndicated (1979-2010); Jewish Life Television (2010-present)
- Release: 1979

The Shalom Show on TV is a public affairs television program that focuses on Israel and Jewish life subject matter with cultural, educational, and entertainment programming of interest to the American Jewish community. The show features magazine-style specials and in-depth interviews with Israeli and American leaders in politics, business, technology, medicine, education, culture, and entertainment.

The Shalom Show airs throughout the United States on the Jewish Life Television network. The Shalom Show first aired in South Florida in 1979 on local broadcast stations.

Guests on The Shalom Show include Senior Pastor Bob Coy of the Calvary Chapel, Dr. Abraham S. Fischler, Congressman Allen West, and Stan Chesley. It has filmed segments and interviews in Israel.

The show was created and is hosted by Richard Peritz.
