= Murder of April Lacy =

Unsolved murder of American girl

April Lacy
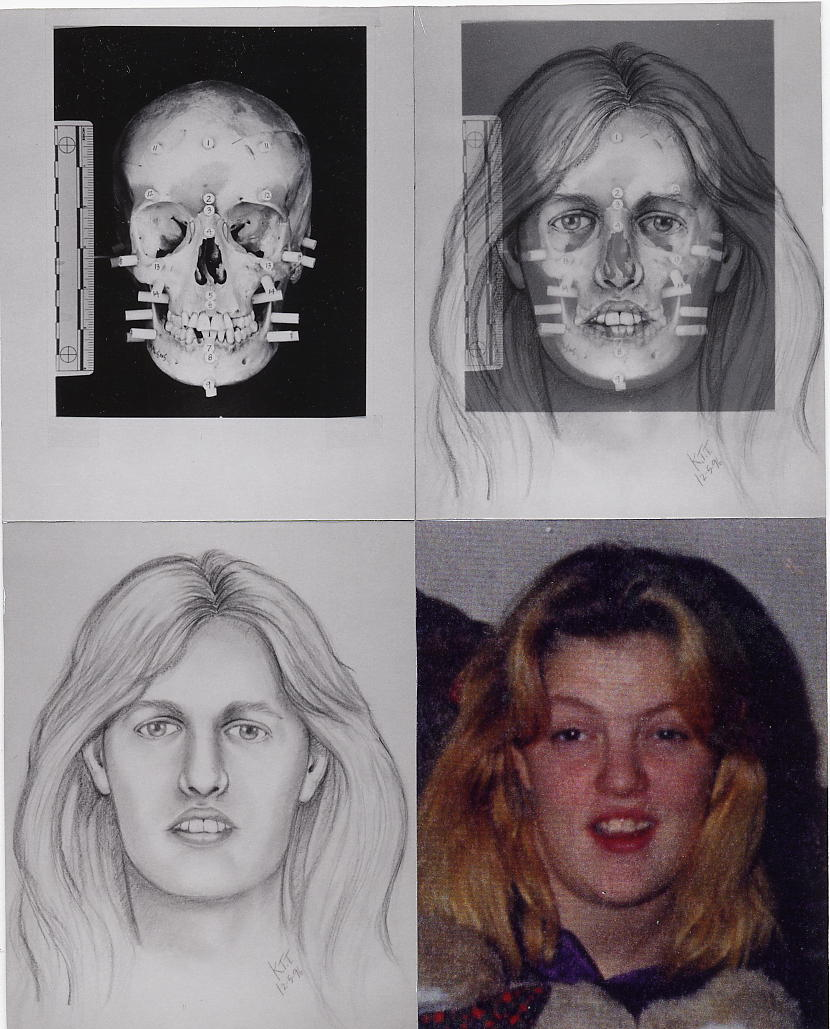
- Forensic facial reconstruction process of Brush Girl alongside photograph of April Lacy
- Born: April Dawn Lacy; June 2, 1982; Oklahoma City, Oklahoma, US
- Died: October 3–8, 1996 (aged 14); Decatur, Texas, US
- Cause of death: Homicide by strangulation
- Body discovered: October 8, 1996
- Other name: Brush Girl
- Known for: Former unidentified victim of homicide

April Dawn Lacy (nicknamed "Brush Girl") was a previously unidentified American homicide victim who was discovered in 1996 in Decatur, Texas. She was identified in 1998 after her face was reconstructed and dental information was compared between both subjects. Although her body was identified, her murder remains unsolved. The circumstances surrounding it are unknown, although she is believed by police to have run away from home and may have been a victim of sex trafficking and sexual assault.

== Circumstances ==
April was born in Oklahoma City, Oklahoma, on June 2, 1982. She grew up in a poor family who used both drugs and alcohol and was often estranged from them, as she frequently stayed at a friend's house.

April had a dysfunctional relationship with her parents, who allowed her to use substances such as cigarettes at a young age. The family reportedly lived in cheap hotels and rummaged through garbage for aluminum cans and other items to provide money for food and drugs. It is also believed that her mother, Jacqueline, had coerced her into prostitution and shoplifting to provide for her cocaine addiction, although she claims April was not involved with sex trafficking. When she failed to succeed with these tasks, April claimed that she was physically abused.

April ran away from home after an argument with Jacqueline, who refused to converse with her for reasons unknown, possibly due to conflict between her parents. Jacqueline reported her missing on October 3, 1996, which she claimed was the day the argument took place. Her father, Dale, also reported her missing three months later.

Members of the police force have stated that they believe Jacqueline knew more about April’s murder than she had said, as there is strong evidence that Jacqueline had prostituted her. The state of her remains suggested that she had been missing for longer than reported, as it appeared that she had died at least a week, instead of five days, before their discovery.

== Discovery ==
On October 8, 1996 a farmer discovered a girl's nude body in a pile of dead branches outside Decatur. When police officers came to the scene, it was presumed that she had been strangled and then dragged by the arm to the pile of brush, judging by the position of her body. It had decomposed to a point where she was not in a recognizable state, which often causes problems with body identification. Investigators noted that the victim had dyed her hair blonde, bit her nails, and was between 5′4″ and 5′5″ tall (~164 cm) at a weight of 110 to 130 pounds (~54 kg). She also lacked any visible identifying features, such as scars or tattoos. A forensic dentist examined her teeth and concluded she was around 14 when she was murdered, although initial reports stated she was between 20 and 40.

== Investigation ==
Because the girl remained unidentified for some time, the officer investigating the case dubbed her as "Brush Girl". Authorities attempted to identify her body by using her physical description to match to missing persons, who were ruled out of the case. Because her body was found near the border between Texas and Oklahoma, it was presumed she may have been native to Oklahoma City or possibly Dallas, Texas.

April's face was reconstructed by forensic artist Karen T. Taylor to aid in her future identification. Authorities interviewed Dale and Jacqueline about the circumstances of her disappearance and showed them the sketch of the unidentified girl, which bore a strong resemblance. The Lacy family was reportedly in denial about the possibility that she was murdered, as they "wanted more proof" than a match of dental records, which was made after the teeth of the victim and X-rays taken of her teeth were compared. Additionally, comparison of sinus passages also matched between the subjects, but did not convince her family. DNA was eventually compared and matched.

It is believed that April was murdered by a serial killer who had preyed on prostitutes in the same area. There was also a possibility that she was a victim of the Redhead murders, although her murder took place over a decade after it began. Authorities have also traced leads across Oklahoma with no results.

== See also ==
- Cold case
- Crime in Texas
- Forensic facial reconstruction
- List of solved missing person cases: 1990s
- List of unsolved murders (1980–1999)
- National Center for Missing and Exploited Children
- The Doe Network
- Unidentified decedent

== Cited works and further reading ==
- Finkelhor, David; Sedlak, Andrea; Hotaling, Gerald T. (1990). Missing, Abducted, Runaway, and Thrownaway Children in America. New York: Officers of Juvenile Justice and Delinquency Prevention. ISBN 0-788-12651-2.
- Halber, Deborah (2015). The Skeleton Crew: How Amateur Sleuths Are Solving America's Coldest Cases. New York: Simon & Schuster. ISBN 978-1-451-65758-6.
- Pettem, Silvia (2013). Cold Case Research: Resources for Unidentified, Missing, and Cold Homicide Cases. Boca Raton: CRC Press. ISBN 978-1-466-57053-5.
- Taylor, Karen T. (2000). Forensic Art and Illustration. New York: CRC Press. ISBN 978-0-849-38118-8.
