= Robert Morrow (Texas politician) =

American politician (born 1964)

Robert Partlow Morrow
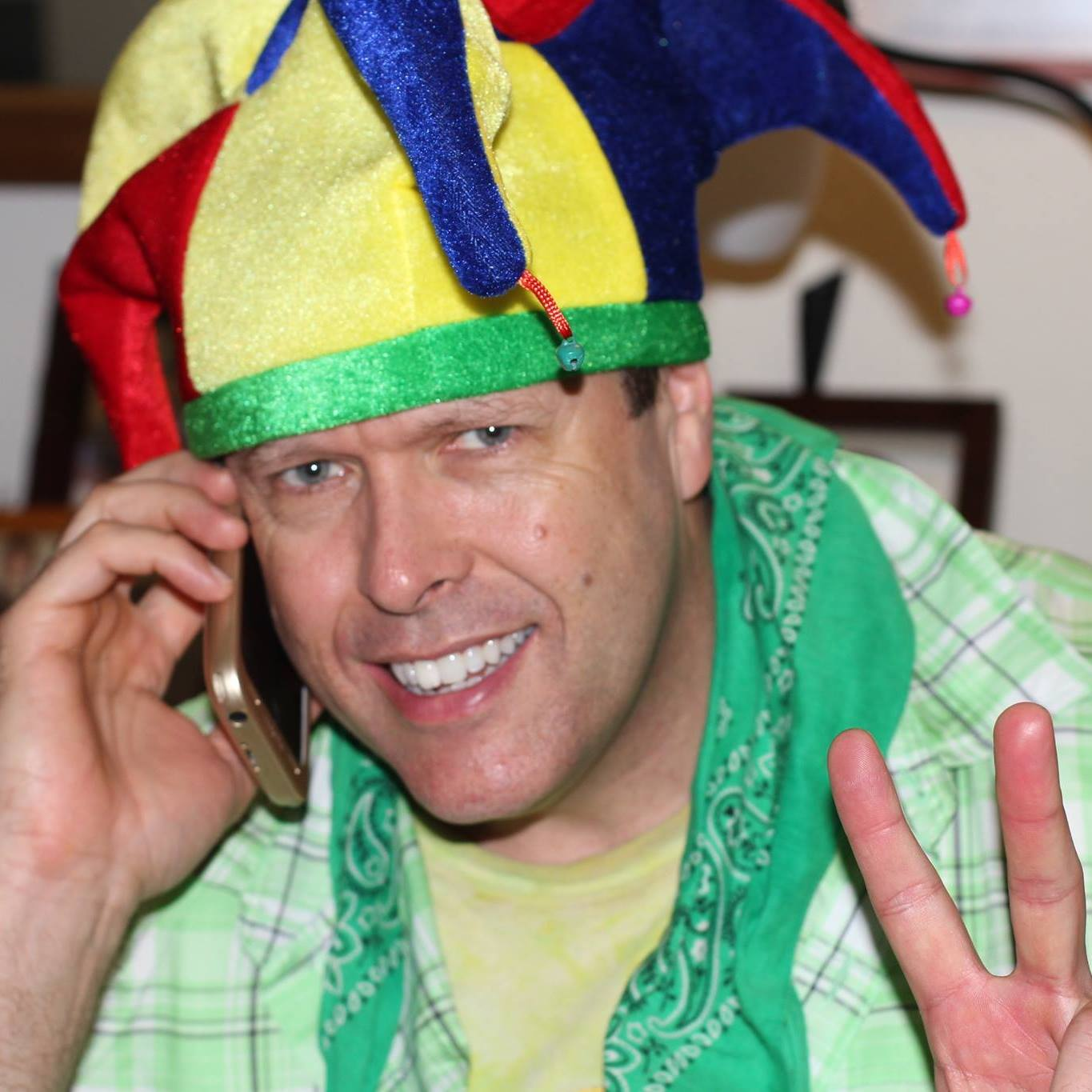

Chairman of the Travis County Republican Party
- In office June 13, 2016 – August 19, 2016
- Preceded by: James Dickey
- Succeeded by: James Dickey

Personal details
- Born: June 20, 1964 (age 62) Tuscaloosa, Alabama, U.S.
- Education: Princeton University (BA); University of Texas at Austin (MBA)
- Occupation: Investor; Co-author with Roger Stone, The Clintons' War on Women

Robert Partlow Morrow (born June 20, 1964) is the former chairman of the Republican Party of Travis County in the capital city of Austin, Texas. When he unseated chairman James R. Dickey in the primary election held on March 1, 2016, media reports referred to him as a conspiracy theorist. Morrow gave up his post when he filed as a write-in candidate for president.

== Background ==
Morrow is from Tuscaloosa, Alabama, where his father was engaged in the real estate business. He graduated in 1987 with a Bachelor of Arts in history from Princeton University in New Jersey, and received a Master of Business Administration degree in 1990 from the University of Texas at Austin. He is a self-employed investor and author.

Morrow was a star basketball player in high school at Tuscaloosa Academy where his basketball teams were 90–0 from 1981 to 1983. He considered himself a political liberal and supported then Governor Michael Dukakis in Dukakis' unsuccessful Democratic 1988 campaign against Republican Vice President George Herbert Walker Bush. As a child, he helped his mother, Rosa Partlow Morrow, first win election in 1978 from legislative district 47 to one of 133 seats on the Alabama State Democratic Executive Committee, a position which his grandfather, William Dempsey "Billy" Partlow, Jr. (1907–1975), had formerly held until his death and which she held first for two years by appointment. Like her son, Rosa Morrow was later active in the GOP, having donated $5,000 in 2004 to the Republican National Committee.

== Political activities ==
Morrow has garnered national media coverage for his offensive comments and his erratic behavior on social media. Esquire magazine compared Morrow to then–Republican presidential front-runner Donald Trump as reflecting the "rampaging id" of the party. Morrow said that he planned to use his position "as a bully platform to educate and inform the American public about the criminals and vipers who have run both the Republican and Democratic parties". He remarked that he would out the sexuality of conservatives with a record of anti-gay activism: "I love exposing these sexual hypocrites in the Republican Party". On March 8, a week after his election, a meeting of the Travis County party voted to disavow him. Morrow responded, "I'm going to do what I'm going to do."

Morrow claims that Vice President Lyndon B. Johnson of Texas, with the help of the CIA, was involved in the 1963 assassination of John F. Kennedy. Morrow claims to be an expert on the topic because he claims to own four hundred books on the assassination. He says the three-pointed jester's hat he wears represents three covered-up murders by U.S. politicians.

Morrow called the 2016 Democratic presidential candidate Hillary Clinton an "angry bull dyke" and Republican former Governor Rick Perry "a rampaging bisexual adulterer." He says that "much of the Bush family should be in jail."

Governor Greg Abbott, Perry's successor, unable to prevent Morrow from being seated as county chairman, said that he did not consider Morrow a spokesman for the party. Vice chairman Matt Mackowiak called Morrow's election "a coup" and has sought to prevent him from becoming chairman. Morrow said that the leadership which opposes him can "go fuck themselves." Mackowiak also called Morrow "a conspiracy theorist to the extreme" and termed his election as chairman a "disaster" for the party. The chairman principally recruits, trains, and encourages volunteers for the general election and usually shuns political positions for the sake of getting out the vote for the slate of nominees. Travis County is a Democratic stronghold in Texas, but some Republicans have won local offices there in recent years.

Morrow could not be removed from office except for conviction of a felony. Otherwise, Mackowiak said that he would try to form an alternate Republican organization that will bypass Morrow, with critical establishment support, and function as the real Republican Party in Travis County for the two years of Morrow's term.

James Dickey attributed his defeat as chairman to voters uninformed about the two candidates and their positions. A similar situation of concern developed when the Democrat District Attorney Rosemary Lehmberg of Travis County did not resign in 2013 after her arrest for driving while intoxicated. After two months, Dickey regained the position when Morrow was forced out by Republican Party leaders and later disqualified for his chairmanship after his write-in presidential bid.

In 2015, Morrow co-authored with Roger Stone, and foreword by Kathleen Willey, The Clintons' War on Women. The book has been described by Politico as a "sensational" work that contains "explosive, but highly dubious, revelations about both Bill Clinton and Hillary Clinton" with a focus on Bill Clinton sexual misconduct allegations. Morrow calls himself "a truth seeker and a truth teller. Even if it's the ugly truth." In a 2008 article on Morrow, the St. Petersburg Times described him as "devot[ing] his life to hating the Clintons and spreading wild, unsubstantiated allegations about them".

Morrow first backed U.S. Senator Ted Cruz of Texas for the 2016 nomination. When Cruz withdrew from the race, Morrow switched his support to party frontrunner Donald Trump, for whom Stone had earlier been an advisor and still supports. Morrow later endorsed Libertarian Gary Johnson for president and stated that he believes the child rape allegations regarding Trump, as detailed in Jane Doe v. Donald J. Trump and Jeffrey E. Epstein, are true. In June 2016, Morrow described Trump as "a disgrace to the human species." Morrow decried Senator Bernie Sanders of Vermont as a "coward" and a "loser" for not challenging what Morrow calls "the Hillary Clinton crime family." He strongly opposed Jeb Bush's presidential candidacy in 2016 and though he admits to having voted for George W. Bush twice for both governor and President, he said that he now deeply regrets those decisions. Considered a libertarian, Morrow also formerly supported Ron Paul in his unsuccessful presidential bid.

Morrow supports abortion and restrictions on immigration. He is very pro-gun rights. He opposes same-sex marriage. Morrow is strongly opposed to Israel and is a supporter of the "USS Liberty Veterans Association" which seeks an investigation of the 1967 USS Liberty incident.

== See also ==
Political offices
Preceded by James Dickey	Travis County Republican chairman June 13 to August 19, 2016	Succeeded by James Dickey
