= Ulrich Ellison =

American singer-songwriter

- Born: Ulrich Guggenberger; December 14, 1980 (age 45)
- Occupations: Guitarist, Singer-songwriter, recording artist, producer
- Instruments: guitar, vocals, piano, synthesizer
- Years active: 1994–present
- Website: www.ulrichellison.com

Ulrich Ellison (born December 14, 1980) is an American singer, songwriter, guitarist and music producer from Austin, Texas. He is the founder of the group Ulrich Ellison and Tribe, which won the 2015 Austin Music Award for "Best Funk/Soul/Blues" live band.

== Life and career ==
Ellison was born and raised in Graz, Austria. He originally started on classical piano and got admitted to the Johann Josef Fux Konservatorium. His career as a guitarist started after moving to Vienna where he studied music at the University of Music and Performing Arts, Vienna, while playing for several Austrian pop and rock acts. In 2007 Ellison came to the United States on a Fulbright scholarship and studied jazz guitar at the Sarah and Ernest Butler School of Music at the University of Texas at Austin. In his two years as a US student he won three of the International Downbeat Awards in the category "Blues/Rock/Pop soloist, college winner". After graduation he became sideman for several notable Austin acts, including soul singer Nakia and Grammy-nominated singer Abra Moore. In 2010 he founded the Ulrich Ellison Trio and has since then progressed his sound in several formations and different lineups.

== Awards and recognition ==
- 2008 Downbeat Student Award, Winner, "Blues/Rock/Pop Soloist"
- 2009 Downbeat Student Award, listed for Outstanding Performance, "Blues/Rock/Pop Soloist"
- 2010 Downbeat Award, "Blues/Rock/Pop Soloist", outstanding performance
- 2014 Austin Music Award, "Best Funk/Soul/Blues" live band
- 2015 Austin Music Award, "Best Funk/Soul/Blues" live band
- 2015 Austin Music Award, "Best Guitar"

== Discography ==
- 2007 Tales From The Kingdom Electric
- 2012 Lose Yourself
- 2014 Synergy
- 2015 Dreamchaser
