= Robin Wilson (eco-designer) =

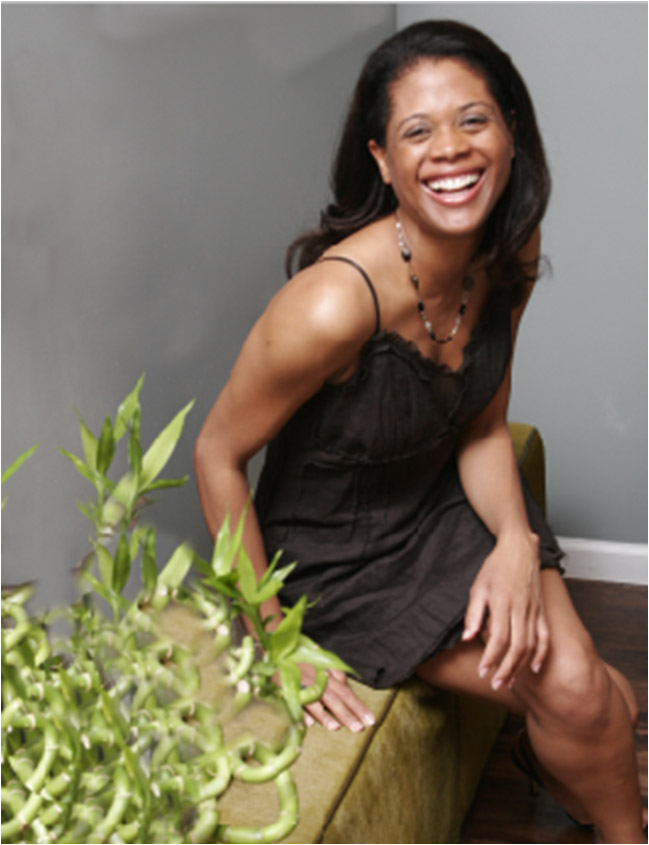
- Portrait photo of Wilson
- Born: September 26, 1969 (age 57); Austin, Texas, United States
- Education: New York University (MS, Real Estate Finance); University of Texas at Austin (BA, Economics/History)
- Occupations: Lifestyle Brand, Author, Interior Designer
- Employer: Clean Design Home
- Known for: Entrepreneur, Author, Clean Design expert
- Title: Chairman, CEO, Founder
- Spouse: divorced
- Children: daughter
- Website: Clean Design Home

Robin Wilson (born September 26, 1969) is an American entrepreneur, author, interior designer, and a wellness/sustainability advocate. She is the founder of a lifestyle brand that relaunched as CLEAN DESIGN HOME at Macy's in 2021, and later BELK, Bed Bath, HSN, Meijer, Amazon, Wayfair and every branch of the military.

Her third book is a hybrid business/memoir, "Combing Cotton: Transform Your Ancestry into Your Competitive Advantage", scheduled for release Q4 2026. (Matt Holt Books/Simon & Schuster, 2026 - ISBN 9781637749821)

Wilson's design work emphasizes the Clean Design protocol discussed in her second book, 'Clean Design: Wellness for Your Lifestyle' (Greenleaf, 2015). Her first book was 'Kennedy Green House: Designing an Eco-Friendly Home from the Foundation to the Furniture' (Greenleaf, 2010), with the foreword written by Robert F. Kennedy, Jr.

She has partnered with Joe Torre " to help domestic violence survivors. Her firm created Project Lilac which provides lilac sheet sets to safe houses identified by the Safe at Home Foundation led by Joe Torre. In 2023, this Project Lilac initiative won a Silver Anthem Award in the category Humanitarian Action & Services-Corporate Social Responsibility-Community Engagement (For Profit).

== Career achievements ==
In 2024, she was named a Distinguished Alumnus by the New York University-SPS School and delivered the convocation to the graduate students at Radio City Music Hall. A few months later, she was named to the Tisch Center Hospitality Innovation Hub list.

She founded her firm in 2000 and rebranded it to the eponymous Robin Wilson Home in 2006. As an early advocate for clean construction method, she insists that work teams use low-VOC paints in both residential and commercial spaces to limit the wheezes and sneezes.

Wilson has done work for President Clinton's Harlem office, the Good Housekeeping Showhouse, the private residence of Robert F. Kennedy, Jr., White House Fellows organization, and in 2014, she completed the EcoBungalow-LA project to rebuild a home for a family who lost everything in a fire.

Wilson was the first woman to license her name to eco-friendly kitchen cabinetry through Holiday Kitchens (licensed from 2008 to 2017), made in the US in Rice Lake, Wisconsin, and sold at over 400 independent dealers nationwide.

She is considered an expert on Clean Design, healthy homes and asthma/allergy friendly information. In June 2011, the Asthma and Allergy Foundation of America announced that she would serve as an ambassador.

Her furniture line, Nest Home by Robin Wilson, premiered at the International Contemporary Furniture Fair (ICFF) in May 2013 in New York City.

In 2020, she rebranded her product line to CLEAN DESIGN HOME which is trademarked and is sold online and at stores including Macy's, BELK, and sold globally to all branches of the military through their online commissary system. Products sold include bed textiles, bath towels, candles, cleaners and other categories.

Wilson is a paid speaker on the topics of entrepreneurship, brand building and Clean Design and is represented by All American Speakers. Plus, she wrote a byline article on the Huffington Post, where she has written about eco-healthy issues.

She had a byline in the Washington Post regarding healthy living in an article about wellness living with allergies.

Robin Wilson has been recognized by the Library of Congress/History Makers project and her oral history has been catalogued.

Inc magazine selected Robin Wilson for the Female Founders 100 (October 2020), its 3rd annual global list of leading women entrepreneurs.
