= Tom Mechler =

Former State Chair of the Texas GOP and past Vice-Chair of TX Board of Criminal Justice

Chairman of the Republican Party of Texas
- In office March 7, 2015 – May 20, 2017
- Preceded by: Steve Munisteri
- Succeeded by: James Dickey

Personal details
- Born: April 1957 (age 69)
- Spouse(s): Tomoko Hayes Mechler (divorced 1997); Rebecca Hill Mechler (divorced 2023)
- Children: 6
- Education: Texas A&M University (BS); Wharton School of the University of Pennsylvania (MBA)
- Occupation: Businessman

Thomas Richard Mechler (born November 1956), is an American engineer and entrepreneur as well as volunteer political organizer who served as the chairman of the Republican Party of Texas.

== Career ==
At the time of Mechler's election as State Chairman, Governor Greg Abbott said that he expected Mechler to "strengthen the party [and] continue the momentum of our state's Republican victories and preserve the very values that have made Texas the greatest state in the nation to live, work and raise a family."

In 2005, then-Governor Rick Perry appointed Mechler to the board of the Texas Department of Criminal Justice where he served for nine years, the last five as the Board Vice-chair. Mechler has served as a Volunteer Prison Chaplain since 2002. On June 25, 2021, the Texas Board of Criminal Justice voted to rename the Tulia Unit in Tulia, Texas the Thomas R. Mechler Unit in Mechler's honor.

Mechler has been a grassroots leader since first becoming involved in Republican Party politics in 1986 in Wasilla, Alaska where he was first elected as a Precinct Chair, followed by his election as the District 16 vice-chair and subsequently becoming the District 16 Chair and member of the Alaska Republican State Central Committee. He held these positions until leaving Alaska to attend the Wharton Business School in 1990. He became reinvolved as a Republican grassroots leader when he was elected the Gray County GOP Chair in 1993 (Pampa, Texas), a position he held until he moved to Armstrong County in 2000. He became the County Chair in Claude, Texas in 2001, serving for a year when he was elected to the Texas State Republican Executive Committee ("SREC") where he served from 2002 to 2006. Mechler first became involved in politics because of his strong pro-life beliefs which he continues to hold to this day.

In his statement of resignation as state Republican chairman, Mechler cited time constraints and business and family matters. Having worked in 2016 to unify the Donald Trump and Ted Cruz factions in the Texas GOP, Mechler called for party unity and outreach in his departing statement. A successor for a two-year term was chosen on June 3 at the state Republican Executive Committee meeting in Austin. Candidates who sought the position were Travis County chairman James Dickey, Rick Figueroa of Brenham, and Mark Ramsey, a state committee member from Spring in Harris County.

The 62-member State Republican Executive Committee and the vice chair narrowly chose Dickey to succeed Mechler. Dickey polled thirty-two votes to thirty-one for rival Rick Figueroa.

Party political offices
Preceded by Steve Munisteri	Texas Republican Party State Chairman; 2015–2017	Succeeded by James Dickey
