= Schave & Reilly =

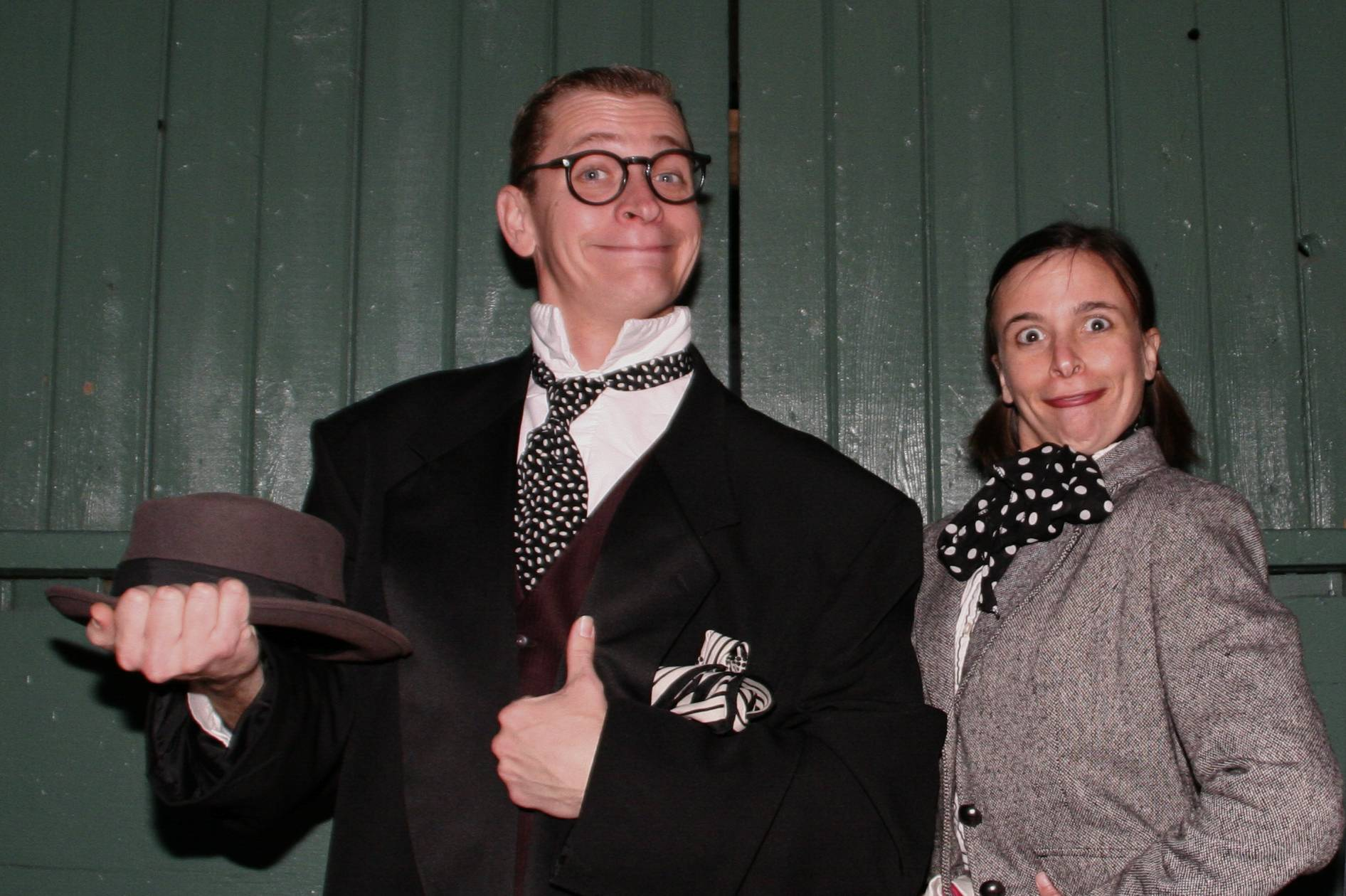
Schave & Reilly at South by Southwest in 2007

Schave & Reilly are a modern-day version of Vaudeville’s “baggypants comedians" who perform physical comedy. The duo is the husband and wife team of Ben Schave and Caitlin Reilly who have worked together over ten years. The pair collaborate to create original material, using the themes of love, relationship, sports, and the workplace to develop their shows . Schave & Reilly are based in Austin, Texas. Trained at the schools of the Dell'Arte International School of Physical Theatre and the University of Texas, the couple met while learning their physical comedy craft at the Ringling Bros. and Barnum & Bailey Circus Clown College. Both performers were influenced by performers such as Charlie Chaplin and by Ray Bolger, the scarecrow from The Wizard of Oz. Bolger was a vaudevillian dance performer whose work in the movie was derived from his vaudeville act.”

In 2001, they toured their original show, "Still Life with Tablecloth, Towel, and Knickers" throughout England. Subsequently, they performed in festivals, fairs, and cabarets across the United States and also on cruise ships They were awarded the Wild Card Best of the Fest Award for their show, "Department of Angels," by the Hyde Park Theatre's FronteraFest in 2007. The duo also received the Best Neo-Vaudeville and Miscellany Award at the Texas Burlesque Festival. Schave and Reilly were designated as Touring Artists of the Texas Commission on the Arts for 2008–2010, bringing their performances to public school audiences across the state of Texas.

Schave and Reilly, true to the spirit of vaudeville, learn and perform a variety of vaudeville skills rather than working as part of a large troupe in which each individual focuses on their own specialization. The duo has mastered and practices fire eating, juggling, stilt-walking, roller-skating and other skills.
