= Doug Sahm discography =

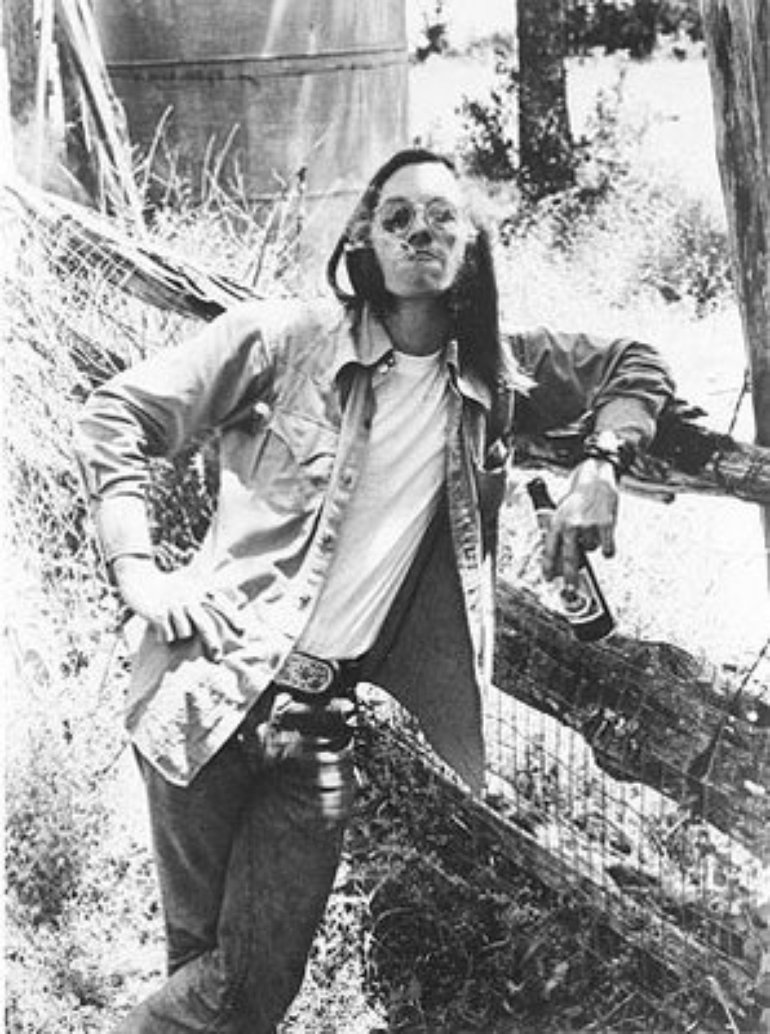
- Sahm in 1974
- Studio albums: 10
- Live albums: 6
- Singles: 27

The discography of Doug Sahm started in 1955 with the release of "A Real American Joe" on Sarg Records. Sahm fronted three bands early in his career: The Pharaohs, The Dell-Kings and The Markays. He released the song "Crazy Daisy" (1959), and he had a local hit in San Antonio, Texas with "Why Why Why" (1960) on Renner Records. Sahm had another local hit with "Crazy, Crazy Feeling" (1961). After he disbanded the Sir Douglas Quintet in 1972, he was signed by Atlantic Records in October 1972, and he released his solo debut album Doug Sahm and Band.

As his record sales continued to decline in the mid 1970s, Sahm rarely performed concerts outside of the Austin club scene. He started the 1980s recording for Takoma Records. He then moved to the Swedish label Sonet Records. With Sonet Records, Sahm found local success in Sweden and Scandinavia. By 1989, he recorded for Antone's Record Label. In 1999, Sahm started his own label, Tornado Records. His last album, entitled The Return of Wayne Douglas, was released posthumously by his label in 2000.

== Studio albums ==
Title	Details	Peak positions	
Title	Details	Billboard 200	Canadian Top 100
Doug Sahm and Band	Release date: 1973; Label: Atlantic Records	125	54
Texas Tornado	Release date: 1973; Label: Atlantic Records	—	—
Groover's Paradise	Release date: 1974; Label: Warner Bros. Records	—	—
Texas Rock For Country Rollers	Release date: 1976; Label: ABC-Dot Records	—	—
Hell of a Spell	Release date: 1980; Label: Takoma Records	—	—
Juke Box Music	Release date: 1989; Label: Antone's	—	—
The Last Real Texas Blues Band Featuring Doug Sahm	Release date: 1995; Label: Antone's	—	—
Get A Life / S.D.Q. '98	Release date: 1998; Label: Munich Records, Watermelon Records	—	—
The Return of Wayne Douglas	Release date: 2000; Label: Evangeline	—	—

== Live albums ==
Title	Details	Peak positions
Title	Details	US Country
Back to the 'Dillo	Release date: 1988; Label: Edsel Records	—
Live	Release date: 1988; Label: Bear Family Records	—
Live in Japan	Release date: 1990; Label: Mobile Fidelity Sound Lab	—
Live From Austin: Doug Sahm	Release date: 2007; Label: New West Records	—
Inlaws and Outlaws: 1973 Radio Broadcast	Release date: 2013; Label: All Access	—
Texas Tornado Live: Doug Weston's Troubadour, 1971	Release date: 2023; Label: Liberation Hall Records	—

== Collaboration albums ==
Title	Details	Peak positions
Title	Details	US Country
Still Growin (with Augie Meyers)	Release date: 1982; Label: Sonet	—
The "West Side" Sound Rolls Again (with Augie Meyers)	Release date: 1983; Label: Teardrop Records	—
Tex-Mex Breakdown (with Augie Meyers and Flaco Jimenez)	Release date: 1983; Label: Sonet	—
The Return of the Formerly Brothers (with Amos Garrett and Gene Taylor)	Release date: 1987; Label: Stony Plain Records, Rykodisc	—
Who Are These Masked Men? (with the Texas Mavericks)	Release date: 1989; Label: Rykodisc	—
Day Dreaming at Midnight (with Shandon and Shawn Sahm)	Release date: 1994; Label: Elektra Records	—

== Singles ==
Year	Single	Peak chart positions			Album
Year	Single	US Country	US	CAN Country	Album
1955	"A Real American Joe"	—	—	—	—N/a
1958	"Crazy Daisy"	—	—	—	—N/a
1959	"Crazy Daisy"	—	—	—	—N/a
1960	"Why, Why, Why"	—	—	—	—N/a
1960	"Baby Tell Me"	—	—	—	—N/a
1960	"Slow Down"	—	—	—	—N/a
1961	"Saphire"	—	—	—	—N/a
1961	"Makes No Difference"	—	—	—	—N/a
1961	"Baby What's on Your Mind"	—	—	—	—N/a
1962	"Just Because"	—	—	—	—N/a
1963	"Cry"	—	—	—	—N/a
1963	"Lucky Me"	—	—	—	—N/a
1964	"Mister Kool"	—	—	—	—N/a
1964	"Cry"	—	—	—	—N/a
1966	"It's a Man Down There" (recorded by Sahm under the pseudonym "Him")	—	—	—	—N/a
1966	"Wine, Wine, Wine" (recorded by Sahm under the pseudonym "The Devons")	—	—	—	—N/a
1970	"Be Real" (recorded by Sahm under the pseudonym "Wayne Douglas")	—	—	—	—N/a
1973	"(Is Anybody Goin' to) San Antone"	—	115	—	Doug Sahm and Band
1973	"Texas Tornado"	—	—	—	Texas Tornado
1974	"Groover's Paradise"	—	—	—	Groover's Paradise
1974	"El Paso Train"	—	—	—	—N/a
1974	"If You Really Want Me To I'll Go"	—	—	—	—N/a
1976	"Cowboy Peyton Place"	100	—	—	Texas Rock For Country Rollers
1976	"Cryin' Inside-Sometime"	—	—	—	Texas Rock For Country Rollers
1984	"I'm Not A Fool Anymore"	—	—	—	The West Side Sound Rolls Again
1988	"Will You Love Me Mañana" (recorded by Sahm under the pseudonym "Sir Doug Saldaña")	—	—	—	—N/a
1990	"You're Gonna Miss Me"	—	—	—	Where the Pyramid Meets the Eye: A Tribute to Roky Erickson
