= Juke Box Music (album) =

Studio album by Doug Sahm
- Released: January 1989
- Recorded: 1988
- Studio: The Fire Station (San Marcos, Texas)
- Genre: Rhythm and blues, doo wop
- Length: 41:53
- Label: Antone's Record Label
- Producer: George Rains

Doug Sahm chronology
Hell of a Spell (1980)	Juke Box Music (1989)	The Last Real Texas Blues Band Featuring Doug Sahm (1995)

Juke Box Music is an album by singer Doug Sahm released by Antone's Record Label in January 1989. Sahm returned to Austin, Texas in 1988 after living and experiencing success with his music in Sweden and Canada. Upon his return, Sahm started to perform at the Austin night club Antone's. The owner of the club, Clifford Antone signed him to his independent record label.

The concept for Juke Box Music was originally discussed by Sahm and the album's producer, George Rains, as they lived in San Francisco in the 1960s. The release was positively received by the critics.

== Background and recording ==
In the early 1980s, Doug Sahm enjoyed success in Sweden and Scandinavia with his collaboration releases with the Sir Douglas Quintet. Sahm then moved to Canada, where his collaboration release with Amos Garrett and Gene Taylor, The Return of the Formerly Brothers, earned them the Juno Award for Best Roots and Traditional Album.

In 1988, Sahm returned to Austin, Texas, where he began to perform at the blues night club Antone's. The owner of the club, Clifford Antone, signed Sahm to the Antone's Record Label. Sahm started to plan his debut release with the label under the name Triplets for a Dying World, as a reference to the type of beat that the songs featured. The musical styles covered included 1950s and 1960 doo wop and rhythm and blues, and the title for the release was changed to Juke Box Music. The sessions were recorded at The Fire Station studio in San Marcos, Texas. Drummer George Rains produced the record. Sahm and Rains originally discussed the project in the late 1960s as the two of them lived in San Francisco. The liner notes of the album were written by Sahm's former Atlantic Records producer Jerry Wexler.

== Release and reception ==
Professional ratings
Review scores
Source	Rating
AllMusic	4.5 stars
Austin American-Statesman	3/5 stars
Robert Christgau	B+
(The New) Rolling Stone Album Guide	3.5/5 stars

The album was released in January 1989, on LP record, cassette tape and on an extended CD version. Sahm started a tour with the Antone's Texas Rhythm and Blues Revue, Angela Strehli, Flaco Jiménez and the West Side Horns of San Antonio.

Juke Box Music received favorable reviews. The Los Angeles Times praised the album as a "delightful ramble through gritty blues, jumping R&B ... and doo wop ballads". The Austin American-Statesman declared that "Sahm just rares back and rips through the material, totally unselfconscious and invariably on target with every bent-nose solo and soulful vocal infection". Texas Monthly defined the sound of the album as "more fresh than nostalgic", and Sahm's voice as "full-bodied and forceful". The Sacramento Bee called Juke Box Music a "pleasure-packed rhythm and blues album".

United Press International commented: "Sahm's singing is in top form". For the Star Tribune, Juke Box Music consisted of a "rollicking collection of vintage R&B and blues." Meanwhile, the Lincoln Star stressed the use of Sahm's "searing vocals, a blaring brass section and a selection of good ol' R and B favorites." The Courier-Journal deemed it a "superbly crafted, roots-rocking, Texas-shuffling, honky tonkin', rhythm and blues." In its review for the version of the album distributed in Canada by A&M Records the Victoria newspaper Times Colonist considered Sahm's vocals "rich and soulful". AllMusic called the music "just terrific", the performances "relaxed" and the collection of songs "a little treasure for fans of R&B and American roots music." Critic Robert Christgau commented: "I've never heard him in better voice than on this unexpected r&b record."

== Track listing ==
No.	Title	Writer(s)	Length
1.	"I Won't Cry"	Dorothy LaBostrie, Joe Ruffino	3:23
2.	"Money Over Love"	Doug Sahm	2:32
3.	"Crazy Baby"	Lawrence Rodriguez, Bryan Thomas	1:52
4.	"You're Mine Tonight"	Glenn Wells, Huey P. Meaux	3:43
5.	"Hey Little Girl"	Z.Z. Hill	3:38
6.	"It Hurts to Love Someone"	Eddie Jones	2:53
7.	"Buzz Buzz Buzz"	Robert Byrd, John Gray	2:27
8.	"My Dearest Darling"	Eddie Bocage, Paul Gayten	3:05
9.	"She Put the Hurt on Me"	Otis Redding	2:46
10.	"What's Your Name?"	Claude Johnston	3:13
11.	"Golly Gee"	Doug Sahm	2:28
12.	"I Don't Believe"	Don Robey	3:08
13.	"The Chicken and the Bop"	Lloyd Price	2:11
14.	"Talk to Me"	Joe Seneca	3:26
15.	"Goodnight My Love"	John Marascalco, George Motola	1:29

== Personnel ==
Musicians:

- Doug Sahm - vocals, piano and guitar
- Rocky Morales - tenor saxophone
- Charlie McBurney - trumpet
- Mark Kazanoff - baritone saxophone
- Jack Barber - bass
- George Rains - drums
- Wayne Bennett - guitar
- Mel Brown - keyboards
- Reese Wynans - keyboards
- Derek O'Brien - rhythm guitar
- Randy Garibay Jr. - vocals

Studio:

- George Rains - producer
- Clifford Antone - executive producer
- Gary Hickinbotham - sound engineer
