= Texas Rock for Country Rollers =

Studio album by Doug Sahm
- Released: August 1976
- Studio: SugarHill (Houston, Texas)
- Genre: Country, country rock, blues rock
- Length: 32:14
- Label: ABC-Dot
- Producer: Huey P. Meaux

Doug Sahm chronology
Groover's Paradise (1974)	Texas Rock for Country Rollers (1976)	Hell of a Spell (1980)

Texas Rock for Country Rollers is the third album by American country-music singer Doug Sahm. Sahm composed for the album seven original songs, while covers constituted the rest of the album. It was released by ABC-Dot in 1976.

== Recording ==
The album was recorded at SugarHill Recording Studios, in Houston, Texas. The session was produced by Huey P. Meaux and engineered by Mickey Moody. Meaux financed the costs with the success of his Freddy Fender recordings. In addition to vocals, Sahm contributed to the album by playing the lead guitar, fiddle and piano. The backup band consisted of Augie Meyers (keyboards, organ, piano, vocals), Atwood Allen (backing vocals), Harry Hess (steel guitar), Jack Barber (bass) and George Rains (drums).

Covers in the album included Allen's penned "I Love the Way You Love (The Way I Love You) ", Merle Kilgore/Claude King's "Wolverton Mountain", and a Gene Thomas-medley of "Cryin' Inside"-"Sometime". The rest of the songs were seven Sahm-written originals. Sahm played the ballad "I'm Missing You" inspired in the style of Buddy Holly, while "You Can't Hide a Redneck (Under That Hippy Hair)" featured an intro based in Bo Diddley's "I'm a Man".

== Release and reception ==
Professional ratings
Review scores
Source	Rating
AllMusic	4/5 stars
Christgau's Record Guide	B

Two singles were released promoting the album: "Cowboy Peyton Place" / "I Love the Way You Love" (ABC/Dot 17656) and "Cryin' Inside-Sometime" / "I'm Missing You" (ABC/Dot 17674). The ten-track Texas Rock For Country Rollers was released in August 1976 by ABC-Dot Records (Dot DOSD 2057). Upon its release it did not earn major sales, but garnered positive reviews.

It was credited to Sir Doug and The Texas Tornados. The band featured in the record is not the later Texas Tornados, the tejano supergroup that Sahm and Meyer joined in 1989.

Village Voice critic Robert Christgau responded favorably to the country influence on the first side but lamented the use of the steel guitar. Meanwhile, he praised the second side, calling it "redneck hoohah". Dave Marsh opened his Rolling Stone critic by calling Sahm "the greatest of country-rockers". He considered that the country-themed album "flatten(ed) out" his usual blend of "rock, Mexican and country influences". While he praised song "You Can't Hide a Redneck (Under that Hippy Hair)" and the Thomas medley. He concluded that "Sahm owes himself, and us, better than this".

Allmusic rated the album with four out of five stars. The review concluded that the album had "good playing and better vibes" but criticized the producer by declaring that "there is the feeling that somebody was asleep at the wheel".

== Track listing ==
Side one
No.	Title	Writer(s)	Length
1.	"I Love the Way You Love (The Way I Love You)"	Atwood Allen	5:17
2.	"Cowboy Peyton Place"	Doug Sahm	3:35
3.	"Give Back the Key to My Heart"	Doug Sahm	2:51
4.	"Wolverton Mountain"	Merle Kilgore, Claude King	2:30
5.	"Texas Ranger Man"	Doug Sahm	3:24

Side two
No.	Title	Writer(s)	Length
1.	"Float Away"	Doug Sahm	2:38
2.	"I'm Missing You"	Doug Sahm	3:02
3.	"Gene Thomas Medley: Sometime/Cryin' Inside"	Gene Thomasson	2:41
4.	"Country Groove"	Doug Sahm	2:31
5.	"You Can't Hide a Redneck (Under That Hippy Hair)"	Doug Sahm	3:55

== Personnel ==
- Doug Sahm - vocals, lead guitar, fiddle, piano
- Atwood Allen - rhythm guitar, vocals
- Harry Hess - steel guitar, slide guitar, harmonica
- Jack Barber - bass guitar
- Augie Meyers - piano, organ
- George Rains - drums
- "Uncle" Mickey Moody - acoustic guitar, engineer
