= Clay Blaker =

American singer-songwriter

- Birth name: Randall Clay Blaker
- Born: June 27, 1950 (age 74); Houston, Texas, United States
- Genres: country
- Occupation(s): Musician, songwriter, producer
- Instruments: Vocals; guitar
- Years active: 1970–present
- Labels: Texas Musik, Neobilly

Randall Clay Blaker (born June 27, 1950) is an American country musician, singer-songwriter, and producer based in Texas for most of his career. His songs have been recorded by many other artists, including George Strait, Tim McGraw, The Derailers, LeAnn Rimes, Doug Sahm, Johnny Mathis and Barbra Streisand. Blaker has also been a popular regional entertainer and has released several albums of his own material with his band, the Texas Honky-Tonk Band.

== Biography ==
After growing up in Texas, Blaker spent time in Hawaii and California before returning to Texas in the 1970s. In San Marcos, Texas he got to know the members of the Ace in the Hole Band, including their front-man George Strait. Blaker's Texas Honky Tonk Band played with the Ace in the Hole Band at a number of venues in Houston and Central Texas.

In 1982, Strait included Blaker's song "The Only Thing I Have Left" on his second album, Strait from the Heart. Tim McGraw later covered the song. Strait has since recorded six more songs by Blaker, including "She Lays It All on the Line" for the soundtrack to Strait's 1992 film Pure Country.

In 1999, Barbra Streisand recorded his song "We Must Be Loving Right", co-written with Roger Brown, after hearing Strait's version of it. According to Blaker, Streisand's husband James Brolin had been playing Strait's album, and Streisand "heard the song and liked it enough to put it on her next album. That album was all love songs, so it fit right in." He has also written songs with Jim Lauderdale and others.

Also in 1999, Blaker participated in Doug Sahm's last recording project, "Doug Sahm – The Return of Wayne Douglas", which turned out to be Sahm's final album, as he died later that year. The Austin Chronicle called it "... pure Texas-style country music ...". Blaker was the acoustic guitarist and assistant engineer on the album and co-wrote one of the songs with Sahm that they recorded as a duet, "I Don’t Trust No One When it Comes to My Heart".

Blaker has produced records, mostly for himself and other regional Texas artists, including the Ed Burleson song "My Perfect World".

In 2002, Blaker announced that he was retiring and moving to an island off the coast of Panama. Although retired from touring, Blaker is still writing songs and in 2015 released a trilogy of EPs of all new music called "Still Swingin'", "Still Rockin'", and "Still Country".

In 2017, a double live album was released of Blaker and his Texas Honky-Tonk Band called "Live-Through the Years 1979–2002". Also in 2017, an article in the Houston Chronicle named Blaker's 1998 album "Rumor Town" one of the best Texas singer-songwriter albums of all-time.

== Discography ==
Blaker recorded the following albums:

- What a Way to Live – Texas Musik Records (1982)
- Sooner or Later – Texas Musik Records (1986)
- Layin' it All on the Line – Neobilly Records (1993)
- Rumor Town – Neobilly Records (1998)
- Welcome to the Wasteland – Neobilly Records (2000)
- Still Rockin' – Neobilly Records (2015)
- Still Swingin' – Neobilly Records (2015)
- Still Country' – Neobilly Records (2015)
- The Early Singles: 1978–1987' – Neobilly Records (2016)
- What a Way To Live – Re-release Edition' – Neobilly Records (2016)
- Through the Years 1979–2002, Vol. 1 (Live)' – Neobilly Records (2017)
- Through the Years 1979–2002, Vol. 2 (Live)' – Neobilly Records (2017)
- The Lost Nashville Session' – Neobilly Records (2019)
