= Border Wave =

Studio album by Sir Douglas Quintet
- Released: 1981
- Studio: Electric Lady
- Label: Takoma
- Producer: Craig Leon, Cassell Webb

Sir Douglas Quintet chronology
The Best of the Sir Douglas Quintet (1980)	Border Wave (1981)	Live Texas Tornado (1983)

Border Wave is an album by the American band the Sir Douglas Quintet, released in 1981. Doug Sahm was inspired to record the album after the success of Joe Carrasco and Elvis Costello. It was Sahm's second album for Takoma Records. Border Wave peaked at No. 184 on the Billboard 200. The band supported the album with a North American tour.

== Production ==
Recorded at Electric Lady Studios over five days, the album was coproduced by Craig Leon. Sahm was joined by original bandmembers Johnny Perez and Augie Meyers. Speedy Sparks played bass and Alvin Crow played guitar. "You're Gonna Miss Me" is a cover of the Roky Erickson song. "I Keep Wishing for You" was written by Butch Hancock. "Who'll Be the Next in Line" is a cover of the Kinks song.

== Critical reception ==
Professional ratings
Review scores
Source	Rating
AllMusic	4.5/5 stars
Robert Christgau	A−
The Encyclopedia of Popular Music	3/5 stars
MusicHound Blues: The Essential Album Guide	4/5 stars
Omaha World-Herald	3.5/5 stars
The Rolling Stone Album Guide	4/5 stars
Ukiah Daily Journal	B+

The New York Times wrote that "Mr. Sahm and his cohorts, whether from age or their record production, sound older and heavier, too." Robert Christgau determined that "he handles horns better than most, but the quintet is Doug's home concept, and this reunion could be his best LP ever." The Guardian stated that "the playing is tight, sparse, and energetic, with that Mexican organ played off against neat guitar licks and a tight rhythm section." The Buffalo News praised the "pumping staccato organ and the drawling harmonies." The Cambridge Evening News panned the album, labeling it "bland, irritating, dated and full of jumpy, up-beat Sixties Searchers-type songs." The Omaha World-Herald considered the lyrics to be "painfully thin."

AllMusic wrote: "How someone as old wave as Doug Sahm hooked into the new wave of the 80s is not exactly so mysterious if one examines the rich stylistic makeup of the Sir Douglas Quintet repertoire, and how so many of these grooves were finding their way into the sounds of the so-called new wave era." Reviewing a reissue, the Edmonton Journal stated that "Sahm never had any problem switching gears or focus as he was a true chameleon, comfortably moving from country to rock to blues to Tex-Mex music over the space of three or four releases." In 2012, the Houston Press opined that the band "gives Joe King Carraso & the Crowns a run for their money when the still-bizarre Tex-Mex/New Wave craze was at its height."

== Track listing ==
No.	Title	Length
1.	"Who'll Be the Next in Line"
2.	"It Was Fun While It Lasted"
3.	"Down on the Border"
4.	"I Keep Wishing for You"
5.	"Revolutionary Ways"
6.	"Old Habits, Die Hard"
7.	"You're Gonna Miss Me"
8.	"Sheila Tequila"
9.	"Tonite, Tonite"
10.	"Border Wave"
