= Mendocino (album) =

Studio album by The Sir Douglas Quintet
- Released: April 1969
- Recorded: Columbus Recorders, Sentinel Building, San Francisco, CA; Amigo Studios, North Hollywood, CA
- Genre: Tex-Mex, country rock
- Length: 31:05
- Label: Smash
- Producer: Amigos de Musica, assisted by Frank Morin

The Sir Douglas Quintet chronology
Sir Douglas Quintet + 2 = Honkey Blues (1968)	Mendocino (1969)	1+1+1=4 (1970)

Singles from Mendocino
- 1. "She's About a Mover" Released: February 1965; 2. "Mendocino" Released: October 1968

Professional ratings
Review scores
Source	Rating
Allmusic	link
Rolling Stone	(positive)

Mendocino is the second album by country rock group The Sir Douglas Quintet, released in April 1969 on Smash Records. The release of the album was expedited as the result of the success of the title song, which peaked at No. 27 on the Billboard Hot 100 chart during a fifteen-week stay in early 1969. The album peaked at No. 81 on the Billboard 200 charts. Neon Records re-released the album in 2001 and 2008.

== Track listing ==
All tracks written by Doug Sahm, except where noted.

No.	Title	Writer(s)	Length
1.	"Mendocino"		2:40
2.	"I Don't Want"		3:45
3.	"I Wanna Be Your Mama Again"		3:10
4.	"At the Crossroads"		4:30
5.	"If You Really Want Me to I'll Go"	Delbert McClinton	2:35
6.	"And It Didn't Even Bring Me Down"	Martin Fierro, Frank Morin, Sahm	2:30
7.	"Lawd, I'm Just a Country Boy in This Great Big Freaky City"		2:45
8.	"She's About a Mover"		3:20
9.	"Texas Me"	Augie Meyers, Morin, John Perez, Sahm	2:35
10.	"Oh, Baby, It Just Don't Matter"		3:15

== Personnel ==
The Sir Douglas Quintet

- Doug Sahm – vocals, guitar, pedal steel guitar, fiddle
- Frank Morin – vocals, horns
- Harvey Kagan – bass guitar
- Augie Meyers – organ, piano, keyboards
- John Perez – drums
