= Day Dreaming at Midnight =

Studio album by Sir Douglas Quintet
- Released: 1994
- Label: Elektra
- Producer: Doug Sahm, Doug Clifford

Sir Douglas Quintet chronology
The Best of Doug Sahm & the Sir Douglas Quintet 1968–1975 (1990)	Day Dreaming at Midnight (1994)	S.D.Q. '98 (1998)

Day Dreaming at Midnight is an album by the American band the Sir Douglas Quintet, released in 1994. Doug Sahm was motivated to reform the band due to his son Shawn's musicianship and the encouragement from Metallica's manager Cliff Burnstein.

== Production ==
The album was produced by Sahm and Doug Clifford; Clifford also played drums. Doug's sons, Shandon and Shawn, played drums and guitar, respectively. Augie Meyers contributed on Vox organ. John Jorgenson played guitar; Speedy Sparks played bass.

Sahm wrote "Dylan Come Lately" in Copenhagen; he told an amused Dylan about it during Bill Clinton's inaugural festivities. "You Don't Know How Young You Are" is a cover of the 13th Floor Elevators song. Several songs reflect on the band's early days and life in the 1960s.

== Critical reception ==
Professional ratings
Review scores
Source	Rating
AllMusic	4/5 stars
The Atlanta Journal-Constitution	3/4 stars
Calgary Herald	B+
Robert Christgau	(2-star Honorable Mention)
The Encyclopedia of Popular Music	4/5 stars
Entertainment Weekly	C+
The Indianapolis Star	2.5/4 stars
MusicHound Rock: The Essential Album Guide	2/5 stars
The Province	3/5 stars
(The New) Rolling Stone Album Guide	2.5/5 stars

Entertainment Weekly dismissed the album, writing that "mostly it’s just rote bar-band junk: clumsy and powerless." Robert Christgau praised "She Would If She Could, She Can't So She Won't". The Indianapolis Star noted the "mixture of twanging, Tex-Mex and bluesy rock, simple Vox organ chords that got kids dancing at the high school hop 30 years ago, and some power 'wall of guitars' sound to remind you that it's 1994."

The Baltimore Sun admired that "one of the best things about this new Sir Douglas Quintet is that it has no qualms about updating its sound, be it through the guitar crunch in 'Intoxication' or the wah-wah guitar and synths that flesh out the title tune." The Calgary Herald determined that "the ol' cosmic cowboy-rocker leads his new Sir Douglas Quintet through vintage and yet still vital territory, somewhere between John Hiatt and Roky Erickson, between the '60s and the '90s, and somewhere all its own."

AllMusic called the album "the first one that featured Sahm in a totally hard rocking context, the tracks jumping from one heavy groove to the next like some kind of old Saturday night FM underground radio show hosted by rowdies."

== Track listing ==
No.	Title	Length
1.	"Too Little Too Late"
2.	"Twisted World"
3.	"Darling Dolores"
4.	"Day Dreaming at Midnight"
5.	"Into the Night"
6.	"Dylan Come Lately"
7.	"She Would If She Could, She Can't So She Won't"
8.	"You Don't Know How Young You Are"
9.	"County Line"
10.	"Romance Is All Screwed Up"
11.	"Freedom Is Mine"
12.	"Intoxication"
