= Texas Tornado (album) =

Studio album by Doug Sahm
- Released: December 1973
- Recorded: October 1972
- Studio: Atlantic Studios; Wally Heider Studios
- Genre: rock and roll, tejano, blues, jazz
- Length: 37:55
- Label: Atlantic
- Producer: Doug Sahm, Jerry Wexler, Arif Mardin

Doug Sahm chronology
Doug Sahm and Band (1973)	Texas Tornado (1973)	Groover's Paradise (1974)

Texas Tornado is the second solo album by Doug Sahm, released by Atlantic Records in December 1973. Sahm co-produced the album with Jerry Wexler and Arif Mardin. Wexler signed Sahm to Atlantic records after the opening of the label's country music division.

Sahm recorded with Atlantic during October 1972. Texas Tornado was constituted by the leftover tracks of his debut album, Doug Sahm and Band. Sahm's second album was favored by the critics.

== Background ==
Interested in the development of alternative country, Atlantic Records producer Jerry Wexler started a Country & Western division in the label in 1972. Wexler signed Doug Sahm among his acts. Sahm recorded material for the label during October 1972 and his debut solo album, Doug Sahm and Band, was released in 1973. Following his move to Austin, Texas Sahm released the leftover material of his Atlantic sessions as Texas Tornado. The album was credited to the "Sir Douglas Band" and produced by Sahm, Wexler and Arif Mardin.

== Release and reception ==
Professional ratings
Review scores
Source	Rating
The Kansas City Star	Favorable
Detroit Free Press	Favorable
The Cincinnati Enquirer	Favorable
Austin American-Statesman	Favorable
Robert Christgau	B+
AllMusic	4.5/5 stars

Texas Tornado was released in December 1973. The Kansas City Star delivered a favorable review that stated on the album Sahm "proves just how good a writer, composer and vocalist ... [he] is." Critic Bob Talbert of the Detroit Free Press favored the album, and commented on the variety of musical genres and Sahm's "taste of every musical style." Meanwhile, The Cincinnati Enquirer also remarked the mixture of styles and Sahm's voice changing from "the twangy nasal country sound to the mellow crooning style". the Austin American-Statesman considered the album "more consistent overall" in comparison to Sahm's debut release with the label.

Critic Robert Christgau gave the album a B+, and he compared it with previous Sahm releases: "the singing especially has the kind of force and definition he's always rendered irrelevant in the past". AllMusic gave the album four-and-a-half stars out of five. Stephen Thomas Erlewine determined that the album "captures (Sahm) at an undeniable peak and it's undeniably irresistible."

== Track listing ==
Side one
No.	Title	Length
1.	"San Francisco FM Blues"	3:30
2.	"Someday"	3:21
3.	"Blue Horizon"	4:25
4.	"Tennessee Blues"	5:34
5.	"Ain't That Loving You"	4:57

Side two
No.	Title	Length
1.	"Texas Tornado"	2:56
2.	"Juan Mendoza"	2:59
3.	"Chicano"	2:18
4.	"I'll Be There"	2:38
5.	"Hard Way"	2:12
6.	"Nitty Gritty"	3:05

== Personnel ==
Musicians

- Doug Sahm - vocals, guitar, bajo sexto, fiddle, electric piano
- Flaco Jiménez - accordion
- Augie Meyers - Vox Continental
- David "Fathead" Newman - tenor saxophone, flute
- Dr. John - piano, organ
- David Bromberg - dobro
- Kenny Kosek - fiddle
- Andy Statman - mandolin
- Mike Nock - electric piano
- George Stubbs - electric piano
- George Rains - drums
- Rocky Morales - tenor saxophone
- Martin Fierro - tenor saxophone
- Mel Martin - tenor and baritone saxophone
- Wayne Jackson - trumpet
- Jack Wilmoth - trumpet
- Charley MacBirney - trumpet
- Neil Rosengarden - flugelhorn
- Jack Barber - bass
- Steve Vargas - bass
- Frank Paredes - rhythm guitar, vocals
- Luis Ortéga - rhythm guitar, vocals
- Atwood Allen - acoustic guitar, harmony
- Charlie Owens - steel guitar
- Pancho Morales - percussion
- Warren Chiasson - vibraphone

Studio

- Doug Sahm - producer, arrangements
- Jerry Wexler - producer
- Arif Mardin - producer
- Jimmy Douglass - engineer
- Dan Healy - mixing
- Lew Hahn - mixing
- Ken Hopkins - engineer, mixing
