= Groover's Paradise =

Album by Doug Sahm

Studio album by Doug Sahm
- Released: 1974
- Recorded: May–June 1974
- Studio: Cosmo's Factory
- Genre: Rock and roll, tejano, blues
- Length: 34:20
- Label: Warner Records
- Producer: Doug Clifford

Doug Sahm chronology
Texas Tornado (1973)	Groover's Paradise (1974)	Texas Rock for Country Rollers (1976)

Groover's Paradise is an album by Doug Sahm, produced by musician Doug Clifford and released on Warner Records in 1974. Following his return to Texas after his success with the Sir Douglas Quintet in California, Sahm settled in Austin, Texas. As the local music scene thrived, he was featured as the main attraction in local clubs and he recorded his debut album for Atlantic Records.

In California, Sahm became acquainted with the members of Creedence Clearwater Revival, and he signed an agreement with Clifford and Stu Cook to record for their production company after his second Atlantic release was unsuccessful. Groover's Paradise found success in Austin, but it failed to chart on a national level. Meanwhile, it was favored by the critics.

== Background ==
After a drug arrest in Corpus Christi, Texas in 1965, Doug Sahm left Texas to move to California. With the Sir Douglas Quintet, he made hit records, and he performed in San Francisco venues as the hippie scene grew. Sahm left California in 1971 to return to his home in San Antonio, Texas, and he then moved the same year to Austin, Texas. By the early 1970s, the musical scene of Austin soared. Due to the city's low cost of living, between 1972 and 1974, 200 musicians moved to Austin. Sixty-five bands were based around the area, while there were twenty-eight night clubs. The Ritz theater was re-opened to host large shows, as Willie Nelson, Waylon Jennings and Jerry Jeff Walker found major success.

Sahm made appearances at the Armadillo World Headquarters and the Soap Creek Saloon. The Armadillo World Headquarters became a popular club, with a crowd constituted by country music fans, hippies and students. Sahm was often featured as the main attraction of the club. In 1972, he disbanded the Sir Douglas Quintet. He was signed by Jerry Wexler to Atlantic Records, and he released his debut solo album in 1973: Doug Sahm and Band.

== Recording ==
"Groover's Paradise"
Sahm performing the title track of his album

During his time in California, Sahm befriended members of Creedence Clearwater Revival. In 1974, following a second unsuccessful album release with Atlantic Records, Sahm traveled to Berkeley, California to record the single "Groover's Paradise". He signed a contract with DSR Productions, owned by former Creedence Clearwater Revival members Doug Clifford (drummer) and Stu Cook (bassist). The company had an agreement with Warner Records to record Sahm and to provide them with the masters. Sahm was backed by a band dubbed the Tex -Mex Trip. The band included saxophonist Frank Rodarte, session musician Link Davis, Jr. and Los Angeles session musicians. Clifford produced the album and joined the band on drums, while Cook played the bass. All the songs of the album were written by Sahm, except Luis Guerrero's "La Cacahuata". Groover's Paradise was recorded at Cosmo's Factory studio in Berkeley, California. The record sleeve featured art by Kerry Awn, while the armadillos were drawn by Jim Franklin. The cover depicted "various well-known local scenes" of Austin. The recording of Groover's Paradise took place between May and June 1974. The recording featured a blend of country music, tejano, blues and rock.

== Release and reception ==
Professional ratings
Review scores
Source	Rating
United Press International	Favorable
Austin American-Statesman	Favorable
Robert Christgau	Favorable
AllMusic	4.5/5 stars
Austin Chronicle	Favorable
Texas Monthly	Favorable

The single "Groover's Paradise" was released in July 1974. Backed with "Girls Today (Don't Like to Sleep Alone)", it was cataloged under WB 7819. The album was released in August 1974, and Sahm begun a national tour to promote it. Upon its release, Groover's Paradise became a hit in Austin, but it failed to succeed in other cities.

United Press International called it "the best thing Doug has done in quite a while", and attributed it to Clifford's work as a producer. the Austin American-Statesman favored the album, as the reviewer considered it was performed with "finesse and simplicity". Critic Robert Christgau gave the album a B+ grade. Christgau considered Sahm a "master whose core simplicity is completely unassailable". AllMusic gave Groover's Paradise four-and-a-half stars out of five. Critic Eugene Chadbourne opined: "the tracks indicate a mastery of many basic forms such as blues, rhythm & blues, norteño, country, and Cajun and the players always seem to be probing beyond this to find something new." Meanwhile, Austin Chronicle deemed it "the quintessential Austin album" and called its cover art "the ultimate hippie version of Austin". Texas Monthly considered that the album captured Austin's "insouciant essence" as a "carefree hippie mecca".

== Track listing ==
Side one
No.	Title	Length
1.	"Groover's Paradise"	3:25
2.	"Devil Heart"	4:20
3.	"Houston Chicks"	3:48
4.	"For the Sake of Rock 'N Roll"	3:17
5.	"Beautiful Texas Sunshine"	3:30

Side two
No.	Title	Writer(s)	Length
1.	"Just Groove Me"		3:27
2.	"Girls Today (Don't Like to Sleep Alone)"		2:29
3.	"La Cacahuata (Peanut)"	Luis Guerrero	1:45
4.	"Her Dream Man Never Came"		3:06
5.	"Catch Me in the Morning"		5:07

== Personnel ==
Musicians

- Doug Sahm - vocals, guitar, bajo sexto
- Link Davis, Jr. - vocals, fiddle, piano, organ, alto and tenor saxophone
- Frank Rodarte - alto and tenor saxophone, flute, vocals
- Doug Clifford - drums
- Stu Cook - bass, guitar
- Gary Potterton - steel guitar
- Ron Stawlings - tenor saxophone
- John Wilmeth - trumpet
- Johnny Rae - marimba
- The Valley Boys - backup vocals
- The Stovalls - backup vocals

Studio

- Doug Clifford - producer
- Malory Earl - sound engineer
- John Flores - sound engineer
- Russ Gary - sound engineer
