= The Return of Wayne Douglas =

Album by Doug Sahm

Studio album by Doug Sahm
- Released: July 2000
- Recorded: December 28, 1998–April 6, 1999
- Studio: Cherry Ridge Studios (Floresville, Texas)
- Genre: Country
- Length: 46:03
- Label: Tornado Records
- Producer: Doug Sahm, Tommy Detamore

Doug Sahm chronology
| Get a Life / S.D.Q. 98' (1999) | The Return of Wayne Douglas (2000) |

The Return of Wayne Douglas is the last studio album recorded by Doug Sahm. It was released by his own label, Tornado Records.

Following his work producing the first record of the label with singer Ed Burleson, Sahm booked more studio time for himself and the band he used for the Burleson sessions. Sahm recorded all country music tracks. In November 1999, Sahm died during a vacation trip to New Mexico.

The album was finished by co-producer Tommy Detamore and released posthumously. It was made available in Austin in July 2000 and nationally in November 2000. The release received positive reviews from the critics.

== Background and recording ==
In 1998, Doug Sahm started the label Tornado Records with David Katznelson and Bill Bentley. Sahm's first project was the debut album release of Dallas singer Ed Burleson's My Perfect World. The album was recorded at Cherry Ridge Studios in Floresville, Texas. Following the sessions for Burleson, Sahm decided to book more studio time and he held sessions for an album release of his own. The material was mainly recorded in two one-day sessions: one on December 28, 1998, and the next one on April 6, 1999.

The tracks featured honky-tonk music, and the album was Sahm's first to feature only country music. Sahm often used the pseudonym "Wayne Douglas" as his alter-ego for the album credits in which he performed country music songs. The name first appeared on the Sir Douglas Quintet album 1 + 1 + 1 = 4. The name is a transposition of Sahm's birth name. Sahm covered songs that appeared in previous releases such as "Beautiful Texas Sunshine" and "Cowboy Peyton Place". The track "Oh No! Not Another One" criticized country music produced in Nashville. Sahm considered that the musical style of the new releases differed greatly from the genre, and he considered "insulting calling that stuff country music." The Return of Wayne Douglas was produced by Sahm and Tommy Detamore. It featured appearances by Augie Meyers and former Commander Cody and His Lost Planet Airmen's guitarist Bill Kirchen.

During a vacation trip to New Mexico in November 1999, Sahm started to feel sick as he drove from Texas to his destination. His condition worsened and Sahm was advised by the staff of the Kachina Lodge Hotel to visit the local emergency room. Sahm declined, and returned to his room. The cleaning staff of the hotel found him unresponsive and he was pronounced dead on November 18, 1999.

Sahm's son, Shawn, then contacted Detamore for the final details of the recording. Detamore, Meyers, fiddler Bob Flores and Clay Blaker worked to finish the tracks. A number of the songs had been recently written by Sahm, and did not have a name. The final version featured an anecdote by Sahm at the end of "They'll Never Take Her Love from Me". Sahm recounted how he met the writer of the song, Leon Payne, as he traveled with his father. Meanwhile, the album featured a hidden track: Sahm's answering machine greeting message. Nine of the songs were written by Sahm.

== Release ==
Professional ratings
Review scores
| Source | Rating |
|---|---|
| Billboard | Favorable |
| The Monitor | Favorable |
| The News-Press | Favorable |
| The Santa Fe New Mexican | Favorable |
| Austin American-Statesman | Favorable |
| Austin Chronicle | 3/5 stars |
| AllMusic | 4/5 stars |

The posthumous release of The Return of Wayne Douglas was announced for June 2000. The release was then delayed after the distribution company, Alternative Distribution Alliance, dropped Tornado Records the month the record was scheduled to be released. The label's CEOs David Katznelson and Bill Bentley then made a deal with the Houston company Wholesale for the national distribution of the record. Meanwhile, the album was locally released in Austin, Texas in July 2000. It was made available at the stores Waterloo Records and Antone's Records. It was released nationally in November 2000. A celebration of the album release and Sahm's birthday took place at the Hole in the Wall bar in Austin. The evening featured appearances by The Gourds, Alvin Crow and Joe Carrasco among others.

Billboard praised the album as a "divine send-off for a great musician." The Monitor called it a "near-patented Doug Sahm musical feast, a south Texas hippie album that twangs without mercy while two-stepping in tie-dye without apology." For The News-Press the release "sounds at once timeless and old-fashioned". The Santa Fe New Mexican considered it a "bittersweet joy".

The Austin American-Statesman considered The Return of Wayne Douglas the second best album of 2000, and declared it "a reminder of Sahm's immortal versatility." Austin Chronicle gave it three stars out of five. The review opined that The Return of Wayne Douglas represented "not so much a return to (Sahm's) many personas as it is a return to his first love: pure, Texas-style country music." For AllMusic, critic Bryan Thomas gave the album four stars out of five. Thomas expressed that "the album is almost an homage to the state of Texas."

== Track listing ==
| No. | Title | Writer(s) | Length |
|---|---|---|---|
| 1. | "Beautiful Texas Sunshine" | Doug Sahm | 3:22 |
| 2. | "Oh No! Not Another One" | Doug Sahm | 2:54 |
| 3. | "Love Minus Zero/No Limit" | Bob Dylan | 4:59 |
| 4. | "You Was For Real" | Doug Sahm | 3:11 |
| 5. | "Cowboy Peyton Place" | Doug Sahm | 4:45 |
| 6. | "They'll Never Take Her Love from Me" | Leon Payne | 3:46 |
| 7. | "Huggin' Thin Air" | Doug Sahm | 2:52 |
| 8. | "Yesterday Got in the Way" | Doug Sahm | 4:55 |
| 9. | "I Can't Go Back to Austin Anymore" | Doug Sahm | 3:38 |
| 10. | "Dallas Alice" | Doug Sahm | 3:38 |
| 11. | "I Don't Trust No One When It Comes to My Heart" | Clay Blaker, Doug Sahm | 3:21 |
| 12. | "Texas Me" | Doug Sahm | 4:28 |

== Personnel ==
Musicians

- Doug Sahm – vocals, guitar (electric and acoustic), twelve string guitar (electric and acoustic)
- Shawn Sahm – background vocals
- Bill Kirchen – electric guitar
- Augie Meyers – organ, piano
- Bobby Flores – fiddle
- Clay Blaker – vocals, acoustic
- David Carroll – upright bass
- Tommy Detamore – steel guitar
- Dan Dreeben – drums
- Ronnie Huckaby – piano

Studio

- Doug Sahm – producer
- Tommy Detamore – producer, sound engineer, mixing
- Bill Bentley – executive producer
- David Katznelson – executive producer
- Clay Blaker – assistant engineer
- Augie Meyers – assistant engineer
- Billy Stull – mastering
