= Playboy (Gene & Debbe song) =

Single by Gene & Debbe

from the album Hear & Now
- B-side: "I'll Come Running"
- Released: November 17, 1967
- Genre: Pop
- Length: 2:52
- Label: TRX
- Songwriter(s): Gene Thomas
- Producer(s): Don Gant

Gene & Debbe singles chronology
"Go with Me" (1967)	"Playboy" (1967)	"Lovin' Season" (1968)

"Playboy" is a song written by Gene Thomas and performed by Gene & Debbe. It reached No.17 on the U.S. pop chart in 1968 and was featured on their 1968 album Hear & Now.

Don Gant produced it and the recording sold over one million discs; it was awarded a gold record in June 1968.

The song ranked No.41 on Billboard magazine's Top 100 singles of 1968.
