= Sometime (Gene Thomas song) =

Single by Gene Thomas
- B-side: "Everynight"
- Released: 1961
- Recorded: 1961
- Studio: Gold Star (Houston, Texas)
- Genre: Pop
- Length: 2:15
- Label: Venus Records
- Songwriter: Gene Thomas
- Producer: Bill Quinn

Gene Thomas singles chronology
"Sometime" (1961)	"Lamp Of Love" (1961)

"Sometime" is a song written by Gene Thomas, originally released by Venus Records in 1961. After it enjoyed regional success, it was reissued on the United Artists label. The song became a top 100 hit on the national chart. The song was later covered by Paul Revere & the Raiders, Doug Sahm and by the Flamin' Groovies.

== Recording and release ==
"Sometime" was recorded during Gene Thomas' first session at Gold Star Studios in Houston, Texas, produced by Bill Quinn. Thomas wrote the lyrics, while his performance was influenced by the contemporary success of Joe Barry and Rod Bernard.

The song was credited to "Thomasson" (the real surname of Thomas) and published by Grand Prize Music. The flipside featured another Thomas original, "Everynight". It was released on United Artists Records' subsidiary Venus Records in April 1961 (VR 1439), and soon became a local hit throughout Texas. In late July, the Baytown Sun noted it in its rank as the most played in Baytown, Texas and described it as "simple and slightly draggy".

== Critical reception ==
Following its regional success, it was reissued on the United Artists label (UA 338). The reissue entered the market in October 1961 and peaked at number fifty-three on the Billboard. The song peaked at number sixty-two on the Cashbox pop singles chart. Gene Summers recorded a 45 rpm single of the song in 1971 on Maridene Records.

Paul Revere & the Raiders recorded a version of the song with the slightly altered title, "Sometimes," in 1965. Their cover debuted at number 31 on the Billboard Bubbling Under Hot 100 Singles charts on May 15, 1965.

Doug Sahm covered the song in his 1976 album Texas Rock For Country Rollers in a medley that included the Thomas song "Cryin' Inside". A review in the Corpus Christi Caller-Times described both songs as "two obscure Texas hits".

The song became the first of two Thomas songs that would turn into national chart hits featuring him as a solo act, before forming with Debbe Neville the duo Gene & Debbe.
