= Hell of a Spell =

Studio album by Doug Sahm
- Released: January 1980
- Recorded: 1979
- Studio: Sonoma Recorders, Santa Rosa, California
- Genre: blues
- Length: 36:58
- Label: Takoma Records
- Producer: Dan Healy

Doug Sahm chronology
| Texas Rock For Country Rollers (1976) | Hell of a Spell (1980) | Juke Box Music (1989) |

Hell of a Spell is an album by singer-songwriter Doug Sahm released by Takoma Records in January 1980. Sahm was signed to the label in 1979 after it was acquired by Chrysalis Records the same year. Upon request of the president of Takoma, Sahm recorded blues numbers and he dedicated the record to Guitar Slim. While the album was well received by the critics, it was a commercial failure.

== Background ==
After the release of Texas Rock For Country Rollers, Sahm's sales and live performances decreased. Sahm coached a local softball team in Austin, Texas and he hosted a jazz show at a local radio. Sahm was unhappy with the growth that the city of Austin experienced since his move in 1971, and he grew interested in the musical scene of the East coast. With Roy Bechtol, Sahm started Rolling Stranger Productions in 1979.

In 1979, the label Chrysalis Records purchased Takoma Records and it expanded its lineup of artists. Doug Sahm and the Sir Douglas Quintet were added to the lineup. Sahm recorded Hell of a Spell with sound engineer Dan Healy, his friend and collaborator of the Grateful Dead. The sessions took place at Sonoma Recorders in Santa Rosa, California under the production of Healey. Upon request from Takoma Records president Denny Bruce, the songs consisted of blues numbers. Sahm dedicated the album to Guitar Slim.

== Release and reception ==
Hell of a Spell was released in January 1980. With the release of the album, Sahm started a national tour. The album received positive reviews, but it failed to succeed commercially. The Los Angeles Times regarded the album as Sahm "returning to the basics" and defined him as "the reigning master" of the "Texas Blues style". Rolling Stone gave the album three stars out of five. the Austin American-Statesman considered that Sahm "archived a near time-warp effect of returning to a golden age of modern music". The Morning Call defined the release as a "worthwhile trip into the past" that "delivers the goods". AllMusic gave the album three-and-a-half stars out of five. Critic Bob Gottlieb commented that Hell of a Spell "shows off some of the remarkable range of Sahm's abilities and genius".

The album was reissued by the label in 1980, and then in 1988. The catalog of the Takoma label was purchased by Fantasy Records in 1995. Hell of a Spell was re-released by the label in July 1999.

== Track listing ==
Side one
| No. | Title | Writer(s) | Length |
|---|---|---|---|
| 1. | "Tunnel Vision" | Doug Sahm | 2:29 |
| 2. | "Ain't into Letting You Go" | Doug Sahm | 5:17 |
| 3. | "All the Way to Nothing" | Doug Sahm | 3:13 |
| 4. | "Hangin' on by a Thread" | Doug Sahm | 2:37 |
| 5. | "I'll Take Care of You" | Brooke Benton | 4:19 |

Side two
| No. | Title | Writer(s) | Length |
|---|---|---|---|
| 1. | "The Things That I Used to Do" | Guitar Slim | 5:17 |
| 2. | "I Don't Mind at All" | Doug Sahm | 1:18 |
| 3. | "Nothin' But the Blues" | Doug Sahm | 2:15 |
| 4. | "Hell of a Spell" | Doug Sahm | 3:30 |
| 5. | "Can't Fake It" | Doug Sahm | 4:12 |
| 6. | "Next Time You See Me" | Earl Forest, Bill Harvey | 3:23 |

== Personnel ==
Musicians

- Doug Sahm – vocals, guitar
- John Reeds – guitar
- Jack Barber – bass
- John Oxendiner – drums
- Kelly Dunn – keyboards
- Louie Bustos – baritone and tenor saxophone
- Charles McBurney – trumpet
- Rocky Morales – saxophone

Studio

- Dan Healy – producer, engineer
- Jerry Meltzer – executive producer
- Paul Stubblebine – engineer
- Russ Gary – mix
