= She's About a Mover =

- Cover of the 1965 Germany single

Single by Sir Douglas Quintet

from the album Mendocino
- B-side: "We'll Take Our Last Walk Tonight"
- Released: February 1965
- Studio: Gold Star (Houston, Texas)
- Genre: Garage rock; Tex-Mex
- Length: 2:05
- Label: Tribe; London
- Songwriter: Doug Sahm
- Producer: Huey P. Meaux

Sir Douglas Quintet singles chronology
"She's About a Mover" (1965)	"The Tracker" (1965)

Official audio
- "She's About a Mover" on YouTube

She's About a Mover is a 1965 song by the Sir Douglas Quintet that was quickly covered by several other artists. The song has a 12-bar blues structure, and is essentially a rewrite of the Coasters' 1957 hit "Searchin'". The song was recorded in Houston, Texas, at Gold Star Studios.

"She's About a Mover" was named the No. 1 Texas song by Texas Monthly, peaked at No. 13 on the Billboard Hot 100 chart on June 5, 1965, No. 15 on the UK Singles Chart, and No. 8 in Canada. With a Vox Continental organ riff provided by Augie Meyers and a soulful vocal by lead singer-guitarist Doug Sahm, the track has a Tex-Mex sound. The regional smash became a breakaway hit, and the song was later used in the soundtracks of the films Echo Park (1986 – cover version by Jimmie Wood & The Immortals), American Boyfriends (1989), The Doors (1991), Riding in Cars with Boys (2001), Sorority Boys (2002), and Beautiful Darling (2010).

In 1983, the song appeared on Ringo Starr's ninth album Old Wave.
