= Doug Sahm and Band =

- Gilbert Shelton's cover art for Doug Sahm and Band

Studio album by Doug Sahm
- Released: January 1973
- Recorded: October 1972
- Studio: Atlantic Studios, New York, NY
- Genre: Country rock, country
- Length: 45:05
- Label: Atlantic Records
- Producer: Jerry Wexler, Arif Mardin, Doug Sahm

Doug Sahm chronology
Doug Sahm and Band (1973)	Texas Tornado (1973)

Doug Sahm and Band is the debut solo album of American singer-songwriter Doug Sahm. In 1972, after leaving the Sir Douglas Quintet, Sahm moved to Austin, Texas. He was signed by Jerry Wexler to the newly opened country music division of Atlantic Records, and started the album sessions by October 1972. It featured appearances by Bob Dylan, Dr. John, David "Fathead" Newman, Flaco Jimenez, David Bromberg and Kenny Kosek.

The album garnered mixed reviews upon release and sold poorly. It was listed by Billboard in Top LP's and Tapes at 125. The album was favored in later reviews.

== Background ==
After a string of successful recordings in the late sixties, the Sir Douglas Quintet split in 1972. Doug Sahm, then based in San Francisco, decided to return to Texas and moved to Austin. The burgeoning alternative musical scene of the city included artists such as Willie Nelson and Jerry Jeff Walker. Venues frequented by Sahm included the Soap Creek Saloon and Armadillo World Headquarters.

Interested in the development of alternative country, Atlantic Records producer Jerry Wexler started a Country & Western division in the label. Wexler signed Sahm among his acts.

== Recording ==
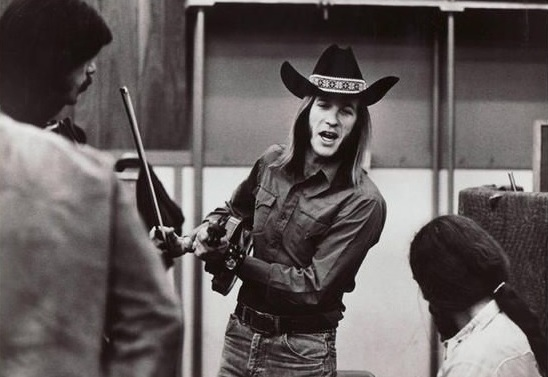
Sahm recording for Atlantic in 1972

Produced by Sahm, Wexler and Arif Mardin, the recording sessions took place during the first two weeks of October 1972, at the Atlantic Records recording studios on West 60th Street in New York. Guest musicians included Bob Dylan, Dr. John, David "Fathead" Newman, Flaco Jiménez, David Bromberg and Kenny Kosek. Meanwhile, Elton John visited the studio.

"Is Anybody Goin' to San Antone" opened the album. It included twin fiddles by Sahm and Ken Kosek, with the steel guitar of Charlie Owens, while Dylan contributed with harmony vocals. Dylan appeared again singing harmony in "It's Gonna Be Easy", written by Atwood Allen, while Allen and Sahm sung the lead. Then, a horn section composed by Newman, Wayne Jackson and Willie Bridges assist Sahm on the Blues number "Your Friends". In "Poison Love" the vocals of Sahm are complemented by Jimenez on the accordion with Augie Meyers on piano, Bromberg on dobro and Andy Statman on mandolin. The Dylan-written "Wallflower" was a lead collaboration between Sahm and Dylan. In "Dealer's Blues" the horn section led by Newman also featured Jack Walrath, Martin Fierro and Mel Martin.

Kosek returned with Sahm with in the twin fiddles in the cover of Bob Wills' "Faded Love". Dylan returned in "Blues, Stay Away From Me", also playing a guitar solo. T-Bone Walker's "Papa Ain't Salty" and Willie Nelson's "Me and Paul" follow. Newman returned in "Don't Turn Around", followed by the closing "I Get Off".

== Release and reception ==
Professional ratings
Review scores
Source	Rating
Christgau's Record Guide	B−

The album was released in January 1973. The singles were "Is Anybody Goin' to San Antone" and "It's Gonna Be Easy". The album garnered mixed reviews and sold poorly, reaching 125 on Billboard's Top LPs & Tapes.

The Billboard review was favorable, calling the LP "the ultimate in mellow country contemporary". The review remarked the importance of Dylan's support. Robert Hilburn of the Los Angeles Times wrote a mixed review, saying "There are some rather ordinary moments in the album, but there are some tracks [...] that you just shouldn't do without". The Rolling Stone album guide declared that Sahm "faltered" on "[a] forgettable album". Robert Christgau rated the album "B−", calling Sahm a "talent, not a genius", and opined that the accompanying artists "only inhibit[ed] him".

Later reviews praised the album. AllMusic rated the album with five stars out of five, with critic Stephen Thomas Erlewine concluded "this is music that is vividly, excitedly alive and captures Sahm at a peak. It's pretty much irresistible". The Vinyl District rated the album "A", and opined that it was "an instant classic—energetic, ecstatic, and in general the kind of LP guaranteed to put a smile on your face".

== Track listing ==
Side one
No.	Title	Writer(s)	Length
1.	"Is Anybody Goin' to San Antone"	Dave Kirby, Glen Martin	3:10
2.	"It's Gonna Be Easy"	Atwood Allen	3:32
3.	"Your Friends"	Deadric Malone	5:24
4.	"Poison Love"	Elmer Laird	4:22
5.	"Wallflower"	Bob Dylan	2:41
6.	"Dealer's Blues"	Doug Sahm	2:58

Side two
No.	Title	Writer(s)	Length
1.	"Faded Love"	Bob Wills	3:57
2.	"Blues Stay Away from Me"	Alton Delmore, Henry Glover, Rabon Delmore & Wayne Raney	3:58
3.	"Papa Ain't Salty"	Grover McDaniel, T-Bone Walker	4:31
4.	"Me and Paul"	Willie Nelson	3:35
5.	"Don't Turn Around"	Doug Sahm	3:29
6.	"I Get Off"	Doug Sahm	2:38

== Personnel ==
- Doug Sahm – vocals, rhythm guitar, rhythm electric guitar, acoustic guitar, bajo sexto, bass, organ, piano
- Doug Sahm and Ken Kosek – twin fiddles
- George Rains – drums
- Jack Barber – bass, vocals
- Augie Meyers – guitar, electric guitar, piano
- Dr. John – organ, piano
- David Bromberg – dobro, slide guitar
- David "Fathead" Newman – tenor saxophone
- Wayne Jackson – trumpet
- Willie Bridges – baritone saxophone
- Martin Fierro – tenor saxophone
- Mel Martin – baritone saxophone
- Jack Walrath – trumpet
- Charlie Owens – steel guitar
- Andy Statman – mandolin
- Arif Mardin – electric piano
- Flaco Jimenéz – accordion
- Atwood Allen – vocals, guitar, acoustic guitar, rhythm acoustic guitar
