= The Last Real Texas Blues Band Featuring Doug Sahm =

Studio album by Doug Sahm
- Released: February 1995
- Recorded: 1988 and 1995
- Venue: Antone's (Austin, Texas)
- Studio: Perdernales Studio, Arlyn Studios (Austin, Texas)
- Genre: Rhythm and blues, blues
- Length: 56:30
- Label: Antone's Record Label
- Producer: Doug Sahm, Derek O'Brien

Doug Sahm chronology
Juke Box Music (1989)	The Last Real Texas Blues Band Featuring Doug Sahm (1995)	Get a Life (1998)

The Last Real Texas Blues Band Featuring Doug Sahm is an album by Doug Sahm released by Antone's Record Label in February 1995.

Following the release of his label debut Juke Box Music, Sahm recorded studio tracks that complemented 1988 recordings of his live performances at Antone's nightclub in Austin, Texas, which he then combined with the earlier live recordings into his second release for the label. The album was favored by the critics and received a Grammy nomination for Best Traditional Blues Album.

== Background and recording ==
During the beginning of the 1990s, Doug Sahm was part of the Texas Tornados. In 1994, he formed another lineup of the Sir Douglas Quintet. Intermittently, he continued to perform at the Austin blues nightclub Antone's. Sahm started to perform at the club following his return to Austin in 1988, and he was signed by Clifford Antone to Antone's Record Label. His first release, Juke Box Music, was issued in 1989. In 1993, Sahm performed during the eighteenth anniversary of the club with a backing group that consisted of house band musicians Derek O'Brien and Randy Garaby, with the addition of Sahm's usual collaborators: saxophonist Rocky Morales, keyboardist Sauce Gonzalez, drummer George Rains and bassist Jack Barber.

In early 1995, he performed blues at Antone's with the Doug Sahm Orchestra. In 1995, Sahm and the band recorded material at Pedernales Studio and Arlyn Studios for a new album. Sahm's live performances from 1988 had been recorded by Reelsound Recording Company. The album was produced by Sahm and O'Brien.

== Release ==
An album consisting of the collection of tracks was presented by Sahm at Antone's in January 1995, at which time he was calling his backing band "The Last Real Texas Blues Band". Sahm then announced an album release called The Last Texas Blues Band featuring Doug Sahm due for February 1995, and a subsequent tour. The album was nominated for Best Traditional Blues Album at the 38th Annual Grammy Awards.

The Austin American-Statesman favored the album in its review, while it remarked that the release was "less consistent and polished" than that of Juke Box Music. The Fort Worth Star-Telegram gave it three-and-a-half stars out of five; of the performances, the reviewer considered the band as "well-rehearsed, but still loose", while he felt that Sahm "sings his skinny behind off". The Atlanta Constitution gave it three stars out of five as it declared that the release "mixes the right amount of reverence and hokum". The Detroit Free Press found it "nothing startling, but a lazy good time", as it rated it with two-and-a-half stars out of five. The Lincoln Journal Star gave it four stars out of five; the reviewer felt that the record was "about loving and living the music and playing and singing it with heart and soul." The Central New Jersey Home News deemed it Sahm's "best release in years." The St. Louis Post-Dispatch delivered a favorable review; the reviewer felt that Sahm "sings his heart out", while the band "is stunning throughout". AllMusic gave it three stars out of five, with critic Thom Owens opining that it was "a nearly perfect roots record" and "arguably (Sahm's) best record ever."

== Track listing ==
No.	Title	Writer(s)	Length
1.	"Reconsider Baby"	Lowell Fulson	4:48
2.	"My Dearest Darling"	Eddie Bocage, Paul Gayten	3:26
3.	"Bad Boy"	Lil Armstrong, Avon Long	3:36
4.	"My Girl Josephine"	Fats Domino, Dave Bartholomew	2:24
5.	"I'm a Fool to Care"	Ted Daffan	2:33
6.	"Something to Remember You By"	Guitar Slim	3:15
7.	"Home at Last"	Rudy Toombs	4:06
8.	"Do Something for Me"	Rose Marks, Billy Ward	3:40
9.	"Intro by Clifford Antone"	N/A	0:06
10.	"Blessed Are These Tears"	Joseph Arrington	4:11
11.	"Loan a Helping Hand"	Don Robey	3:38
12.	"When I Fall in Love"	Edward Heyman, Victor Young	3:46
13.	"Honky Tonk"	Billy Butler, Bill Doggett, Clifford Scott, Berisford Shepherd	6:43
14.	"Tell Me the Truth"	Doug Sahm	4:22
15.	"Round of Drinks"	N/A	0:25
16.	"T-Bone Shuffle"	T-Bone Walker	5:31

== Personnel ==
Musicians:

- Doug Sahm - vocals, piano and guitar
- Rocky Morales - tenor saxophone
- Louis Bustos - tenor saxophone
- Charlie McBurney - trumpet
- Al Gomez - trumpet
- John Blondell - trombone
- Mark Kazanoff - baritone saxophone
- Jack Barber - bass, vocals
- Louie Terrazas - bass
- George Rains - drums
- Denny Freeman - guitar
- Sauce Gonzalez - Hammond organ
- Mel Brown - keyboards
- Derek O'Brien - rhythm guitar

Studio:

- Doug Sahm - producer, mixing
- Derek O'Brien - producer, mixing
- Clifford Antone - executive producer
- Randy Kling - mastering
- Larry Greenhill - sound engineer
- Stuart Sullivan - sound engineer
- Malcom Harper - sound engineer, mastering
