= Get a Life (Doug Sahm album) =

Studio album by Doug Sahm
- Released: 1998
- Recorded: 1998
- Genre: Country
- Length: 36:19
- Label: Munich Records
- Producer: Mike Stewart, Billy Stull, Doug Sahm and Bob Flick

Doug Sahm chronology
The Last Real Texas Blues Band Featuring Doug Sahm (1995)	Get a Life (1998)	The Return of Wayne Douglas (1999)

S.D.Q 98'
- Cover for the release in the United States

Get a Life is a 1998 album by Doug Sahm released by the Dutch label Munich Records. The tracks were recorded in Austin and San Marcos, Texas, Seattle, Washington and Los Angeles, California. The producers of the tracks included Sahm, Mike Stewart, Billy Stull and Bob Flick. Sahm wrote the liner notes for the album. The recordings featured The Gourds, as well as Augie Meyers. Sahm met The Gourds as he performed at a music festival in Belgium in 1997. Sahm approached the band after he heard them sing a cover of his original "At the Crossroads".

The release was credited to Doug Sahm - A.K.A. The Texas Tornado. Watermelon Records released the album as S.D.Q. 98' in the United States in October 1998. The Austin American-Statesman gave the album three stars out of five, and called it a "happily jumbled affair". Meanwhile, AllMusic rated it with four-and-a-half stars out of five. Critic Eugene Chadbourne felt that "musically there is enough (on the album) to create a tidal wave."

== Track listing ==
No.	Title	Writer(s)	Length
1.	"Get a Life"	Doug Sahm	4:21
2.	"St. Olav's Gate"	Tom Russell	4:28
3.	"Goodbye San Francisco - Hello Amsterdam"	Doug Sahm	3:31
4.	"Give Back The Key To My Heart"	Doug Sahm	3:12
5.	"Malmö Mama"	Doug Sahm	4:34
6.	"On Bended Kee"	Bobby Charles	2:05
7.	"Louis Riel"	Doug Sahm	3:50
8.	"The Ballad of Davy Crockett"	George Bruns, Thomas W. Blackburn	3:28
9.	"Sooner Or Later"	R.L. Flick	3:49
10.	"Invitation to the Blues"	Roger Miller	3:01

== Personnel ==
- Doug Sahm - vocals, guitar, fiddle, bajo sexto, steel guitar, hammond organ, piano
- Augie Meyers - vocals, accordion, Vox organ, piano
- Shawn Sahm - guitar
- The Gourds (Kevin Russel, Jimmy Smith, Claude Bernard) - vocals
- Clay Meyers - drums, maracas
- Ernie Durawa - drums
- George Rains - drums
- Keith Langford - drums
- Rocky morales - tenor saxophone
- Mike O'Dowd - tenor saxophone
- Tommy Detamore - pedal steel guitar, guitar
- Kevin Russell - guitar, mandolin
- Speedy Sparks - bass
- Jimmy Smith - bass

Studio:

- Doug Sahm - producer, arrangements
- Bob Flick - producer, arrangements
- Mike Stewart - producer, sound engineer
- Billy Stull - producer, sound engineer
- Bobby Arnold - sound engineer
- Gary Higganbotham - sound engineer
- Boo McLoed - sound engineer
- P.T. Huston - sound engineer
- Debora Hanson - production coordinator
