= James Harman =

American blues harmonica player (1946–2021)

- Born: James Gary Harman; June 8, 1946; Anniston, Alabama
- Died: May 23, 2021 (aged 74)
- Genres: Blues
- Occupations: Musician, singer, songwriter
- Instrument: Harmonica
- Years active: 1970s–2020s
- Label: Black Top

James Gary Harman (June 8, 1946 – May 23, 2021) was an American blues harmonica player, singer, and songwriter. The music journalist Tony Russell described Harman as an "amusing songwriter and an excellent, unfussy blues harp player".

== Biography ==
Born in Anniston, Alabama, Harman began taking piano lessons at the age of four. He also sang in his local church choir. Harmonicas owned by his father were stored in the piano bench, and James tried playing them after his piano lessons ended. In time, he learned to play several other musical instruments, including the guitar, electronic organ, and drums.

In 1962, he relocated to Panama City, Florida, where he played in many rhythm and blues bands, of which the Icehouse Blues Band was the last. Earl Caldwell, the manager of the Swinging Medallions, signed Harman to a recording contract. In 1964 in Atlanta, Georgia, Harman recorded the first of nine early singles, which were variously released on five different record labels.

Harman performed as a blues harmonica player and singer in Chicago, New York City, and elsewhere before moving to southern California in the 1970s. There, his Icehouse Blues Band played alongside Big Joe Turner, John Lee Hooker, Freddie King, Muddy Waters, Albert King, B. B. King, T-Bone Walker, Lowell Fulson, Eddie "Cleanhead" Vinson, Johnny "Guitar" Watson, and Albert Collins. In 1977 he formed the James Harman Band. Over the years the band's lineup has included Phil Alvin and Bill Bateman, who left in 1978 to form the Blasters; Gene Taylor, who departed in 1981, also to join the Blasters before moving on to the Fabulous Thunderbirds; and Kid Ramos. Among other members of the band was Hollywood Fats, who left his own band in 1980 to play alongside Harman for five years.

Harman became known as a skilled, reliable musician, whether for a backing band or leading his own ensemble. His band recorded several albums during the 1980s, before settling in 1990 at Black Top Records.

Numerous songs by Harman have been used in films and on television, including "Kiss of Fire" (from the album Those Dangerous Gentlemen), which was used for the soundtrack of The Accused. Harman has received several W. C. Handy Blues Award nominations, for songs on his own releases and on other artists' albums. He was inducted into the Alabama Music Hall of Fame and received an award for Best Blues Album of the Year from Real Blues magazine.

In 1995, Harman recorded "Everybody's Rockin' (At the Zoo Bar)", a song about the Zoo Bar, a club in Lincoln, Nebraska, for the album Black & White. Harman has performed at the Long Beach Blues Festival and in concerts staged around the world.

In 2003, Harman contributed to the ZZ Top album Mescalero, on the song "Que Lastima" and, in 2012, on La Futura, on the song "Heartache In Blue". Bonetime, his first studio album in over 12 years, was released in 2015. Fineprint followed in 2018.

== Death ==
Harman died of a heart attack on May 23, 2021. He had been undergoing chemotherapy during a five-month battle with stage 4 esophageal cancer. Harman's legacy was celebrated in depth on the May 31, 2021, edition of Dr Boogie's radio show, which included a rare recording of Harman's 1971 guest performance fronting Canned Heat.

== Discography ==
- This Band Just Won't Behave (1981, Ice Pick [7-inch EP])
- Thank You Baby (1983, Enigma)
- Those Dangerous Gentlemen (1987, Rhino)
- Extra Napkins (Strictly the Blues) (1988, Rivera; reissued 1997 on Cannonball Records)
- Strictly Live...In '85! (Vol. 1) (1990, Rivera; reissued 2005 on Pacific Blues/Gulf Coast as Strictly Live In '85 ...Plus! (Vol. 1))
- Two Sides to Every Story (1990, Black Top)
- Do Not Disturb (1991, Black Top)
- Cards on the Table (1994, Black Top)
- Black & White (1995, Black Top)
- Icepick's Story (1996, Continental Record Services/CRS; reissued 1999 on Me & My Blues Records) note: compilation of Black Top recordings
- Takin' Chances (1998, Cannonball)
- Mo' Na' Kins, Please! (Strictly the Blues, Vol. 2) (1999, Cannonball)
- Lonesome Moon Trance (2003, Pacific Blues)
- Side Dishes (2007, Gulf Coast) note: 13-track compilation
- James Harman's Bamboo Porch: Live at Little Village, Volume One (2012, Gulf Coast)
- Bonetime (2015, Electro-Fi)
- Fineprint (2018, Electro-Fi)
- Liquor Parking (2019, BigTone)
- Sparks Flying: Live in 1992 (2022, JSP)
- Back Door Rumba: Live Sessions, Volume Two (2023, JSP)
- Didn't We Have Some Fun Sometime (2024, Electro-Fi)
