= Gene & Debbe =

Country music duo

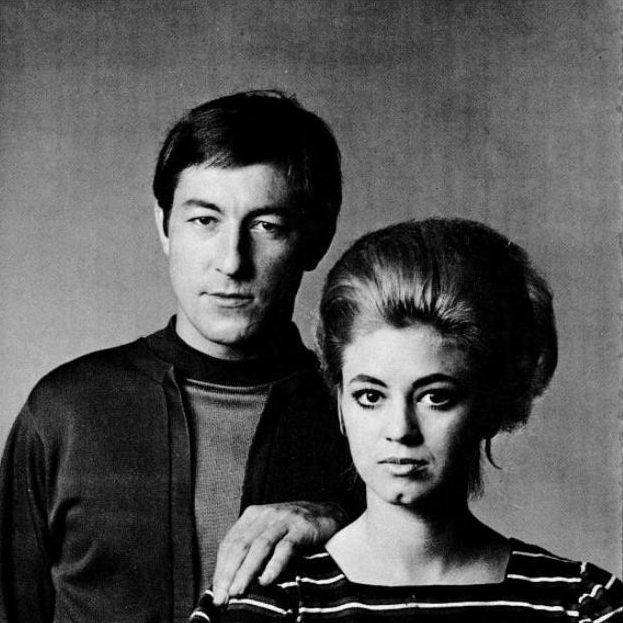
- Gene & Debbe in 1968

Background information
- Origin: Nashville, Tennessee, United States
- Genres: Pop, country

Gene and Debbe were an American pop/country duo hailing from Nashville, Tennessee, United States. They had some brief successes on the U.S. Billboard Hot 100 chart.

Gene Thomas (born Gene Thomasson on 28 December 1937, Palestine, Texas, died 26 August 2012 in Fredericksburg, Texas) had some minor success in the early 1960s with the songs "Sometime" and "Baby's Gone" (1964). After the latter, he dabbled in writing music for a few years. His songs have been performed or covered by numerous other country singers including Waylon Jennings, Kenny Rogers and Everly Brothers as well as Tina Turner. After a few years, Gene met with aspiring crooner, Debbe Neville, (or Nevills as some sources say). In an Everly Brothers style of harmonizing, they launched a career at Acuff-Rose music, singing romantic country style pop melodies.

They were signed to a recording contract with the subsidiary of Hickory Records, TRX, where they recorded their two biggest hits, "Go With Me" and "Playboy". The latter had an eventual combined sales figure of one million discs being awarded a gold record in June 1968. That same year Gene married Debbe and together had a son, Gebron. They shortly after parted ways, professionally and privately ending their union in divorce court. After hitting the charts with "Playboy" at No. 17, they both faded into chart (but not musical) obscurity.

The couple produced one album Hear and Now in 1968, which is a rarity to find. It contains the single "Playboy".

After leaving Gene, Debbe, with son Gebron (a name formed from "Gene" and "Debron") in tow, worked on her solo career. Shortly after her divorce from Gene, Debbe remarried this time to a Houston club owner, Pat Patterson, with whom she had a second son. The marriage was short lived and the two divorced around 1973. She continued on with her solo act until settling down and marrying her third husband in the early 1980s, with whom she gave birth to their daughter in 1983. After the birth of her daughter, Debbe retired from the music business.

Gene Thomas died on August 26, 2012, of lung cancer at the age of 74.

== Discography ==
Title	Release date	Label
Hear and Now	1968	TRX LPS 1001
