= Federico Archuleta =

American artist

- Born: El Paso, Texas, U.S.
- Other names: El Federico
- Occupation: Graffiti artist
- Known for: Murals in Austin, Texas
- Style: Stencil art
- Patrons: Jarritos

Federico Archuleta, also known as El Federico, is an Austin, Texas-based graffiti artist who has created several notable murals in Austin.

Archuleta draws on his Catholic upbringing as a first generation American in creating his works, including Lets Band Together and Virgen de Guadalupe. Most prominent are the stencil-graffiti portraits of Johnny Cash, Willie Nelson, the Clash and others on the old Tower Records/Varsity Theater building, as well as his portrait of Bob Dylan on the Hole in the Wall.

He generates and creates ideas for his art in his garage which in turn is used for the public. He uses a stencil for his sketches and his ideas for his drawing career. In which his work is influential in Mexican pop culture.

He was commissioned by Jarritos to create some murals in southern California.
