= The Return of the Formerly Brothers =

Studio album by Doug Sahm, Amos Garrett and Gene Taylor
- Released: 1987
- Genre: Roots revival, Blues, Americana
- Length: 43:12
- Label: Stony Plain
- Producer: Holger Petersen

Doug Sahm, Amos Garrett and Gene Taylor chronology
| The Return of the Formerly Brothers (1987) | Live in Japan (1991) |

The Return of the Formerly Brothers is an album by Doug Sahm, Amos Garrett and Gene Taylor, released in 1987 on Stony Plain Records.

The album was recorded after the three musicians played a collaborative set together at the Edmonton Folk Festival in 1986. The album's title was a self-mocking reference to the fact that all three of the musicians were frequently billed by the media as "formerly of" various notable bands. Although the album was credited to the musicians as individuals, some later sources have reified "The Formerly Brothers" into the actual band name of the project. The album was supported by a tour, which also included supporting musicians Bohdan Hluszko on drums and Kit Johnson on bass guitar.

The album won the Juno Award for Best Roots & Traditional Album at the Juno Awards of 1989. In the same year, it was released in the United States on Rykodisc.

The trio released a second album together, Live in Japan, in 1991.

== Track listing ==
| No. | Title | Writer(s) | Length |
|---|---|---|---|
| 1. | "Smack Dab in the Middle" | Chuck Calhoun | 3:44 |
| 2. | "Big Mamou" | Link Davis | 2:51 |
| 3. | "Teardrops on Your Letter" | Henry Glover | 4:02 |
| 4. | "Drunk" | Jimmy Liggins | 4:08 |
| 5. | "Don't Tell Me" | Amos Garrett, Gene Taylor | 3:14 |
| 6. | "Coming Back Home" | Gene Taylor | 1:59 |
| 7. | "Sure Is a Good Thing" | Gene Taylor | 3:40 |
| 8. | "Amarillo Highway" | Terry Allen | 4:01 |
| 9. | "Banks of the Old Pontchartrain" | Ramona Vincent, Hank Williams | 3:19 |
| 10. | "Just Like a Woman" | Bob Dylan | 5:15 |
| 11. | "Gene's Boogie" | Gene Taylor | 3:02 |
| 12. | "Queen of the Okanagan" | Amos Garrett, Doug Sahm | 3:57 |
