= Gene Taylor (pianist) =

American musician (1952–2021)

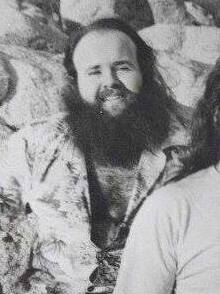
- Taylor with Canned Heat in 1976

Background information
- Born: July 2, 1952; Norwalk, California, U.S.
- Died: February 20, 2021 (aged 68) Austin, Texas, U.S.
- Genres: Boogie rock
- Occupation: Musician
- Instruments: Piano; guitar
- Years active: 1968–2021
- Website: www.gene-taylor.com

Gene Taylor (July 2, 1952 – February 20, 2021) was an American pianist and guitarist best known for his boogie woogie style. Over a career spanning more than 50 years he accompanied many musicians, produced several solo albums and was briefly part of Canned Heat.

== Early life ==
Taylor began his musical training as a drummer at age eight but two years later he had picked up both the guitar and his initial piano skills from boogie-woogie pianist-neighbours. By the age of 16 he was an orphan and was essentially forced to fund himself - his receding hairline disguising his remarkable youth. He soon found himself working with some of the big names in the West Coast blues scene including Big Joe Turner and T-Bone Walker, aided by the fact that he "was cheap" and had a driver's license and was thus able to not only add piano parts but also make sure that the musicians reached their gigs.

== Harman and Canned Heat ==
In the mid-seventies he joined the James Harman Band and had a stint as pianist for boogie group Canned Heat between November 1974 and May 1976. There are no known recordings of Taylor playing with Canned Heat during this period but ten songs were later recorded with part of the band, Taylor playing piano with Larry Taylor and Fito de la Parra. According to Canned Heat historian, Walter de Paduwa, Taylor's abrupt departure from the band came in 1976 when an apparently banal spat over a pizza at a restaurant in the south of France turned into a full blown argument. Taylor returning to Long Beach, California, then, two years later relocating to Toronto. He would remain based in Canada, on and off, until 1993, often playing with his friend Morgan Davis and the Downchild Blues Band.

== 1980s and 1990s ==
From 1981 to 1984 he first toured with The Blasters, with whom he formed one of his most lasting and important collaboration that would eventually yield three albums. In 1986 Taylor finally recorded his first solo album, Handmade. His The Return of the Formerly Brothers, recorded with Amos Garrett and Doug Sahm in 1987, won a Juno Award the following year for Best Roots & Traditional Album.

In 1993, Taylor relocated from Canada to Austin, Texas. Here he began to play with The Fabulous Thunderbirds, a partnership which would last until 2006 and included two 'solo' albums with the band's leader Kim Wilson. In 2002, he also found time to join the tours and recordings for the “Original Blasters Reunion”. He recorded an eponymous second solo album for Pacific Blues in 2003 partly accompanied by James Harman and Bill Bateman. This album included a version of "Pinetop's Boogie Woogie".

== Belgium ==
From 2007, Taylor was often based in Belgium, playing and recording with Fried Bourbon, CC Jerome's Jet Setters, Dave Alvin and Jo' Buddy. He toured as the Gene Taylor Trio, with drummer Nico Vanhove, and the guitarist Bart De Mulder. He played at the Brussels Boogie-Woogie Festival of 2012, which took place at the Théâtre St Michel on November 24. Shortly after his death, the Dr Boogie show on Belgium's Classic 21 radio commemorated Taylor with an hour of programming and cited him as 'almost Belgian'.

== Death ==
On February 20, 2021, Taylor's housemate - the filmmaker Monty McMillan - found him dead in his bed in their home in Austin, Texas. The cause of death was suspected to be hypothermia, as the house had been without heat in the dead of winter amid the 2021 Texas power issue .

== Discography (selection since 1981) ==
- 2017: It's Too Late Now (with Chris Ruest)
- 2013: Roadhouse Memories (solo)
- 2010: Let Me Ride In Your Automobile (with CC Jerome's Jetsetters)
- 2009: Introducing... (with CC Jerome's Jetsetters)
- 2008: Live!!! 605 Boogie!!! (live, Gene Taylor Blues Band featuring Dave Alvin)
- 2007: James Harman's Bamboo Porch (with James Harman)
- 2007: Hell Can Wait (with Carlos Guitarlos)
- 2007: Boogie Blend Blues (with Fried Bourbon)
- 2005: Painted On (with The Fabulous Thunderbirds)
- 2005: Live (with The Fabulous Thunderbirds)
- 2004: Come On In (with The Downchild Blues Band), winner at the 2005 Maple Blues Awards
- 2003: Lonesome Moon Trance (with James Harman)
- 2003: Going Home (live, with The Blasters)
- 2003: Gene Taylor (solo)
- 2002: Trouble Bound (live, with The Blasters)
- 2002: Testament (with The Blasters)
- 2002: Bogart's Bounce (with JW-Jones)
- 2002: If I Had A Genie (with Junior Watson), Taylor plays on all but 4 tracks
- 2000: Mo Na'kins, Please! (with James Harman)
- 1999: Kid Ramos (with Kid Ramos)
- 1998: Takin' Chances (with James Harman)
- 1996: Icepick's Story (with James Harman)
- 1995: That's Life (with Kim Wilson)
- 1995: Roll Of The Dice (with The Fabulous Thunderbirds)
- 1995: In My Time (with Charlie Musselwhite)
- 1995: Black & White (with James Harman)
- 1994: Tiger Man (with Kim Wilson)
- 1994: Cards On The Table (with James Harman)
- 1993: Two Sides To Every Story (with James Harman)
- 1992: King King (live, with The Red Devils)
- 1992: Bluesology (Pyramid Records compilation)
- 1992: I Was Just Thinking That... (live album with Jackson Delta)
- 1991: Do Not Disturb (with James Harman)
- 1990: Live In Japan (as The Amos Garrett, Doug Sahm, Gene Taylor Band)
- 1990: Collection (with The Blasters)
- 1989: Gone Fishing (with The Downchild Blues Band)
- 1988: Extra Napkins (with James Harman)
- 1987: Those Dangerous Gentlemen (with James Harman)
- 1987: The Return Of The Formerly Brothers (The Amos Garrett, Doug Sahm, Gene Taylor Band)
- 1987: Pigus Drunkus Maximus (with Top Jimmy & The Rhythm Pigs), actually recorded in 1981 but delayed 6 years before release/issue
- 1987: Nobody But You (with John Hammond)
- 1987: It's Been So Long (with The Downchild Blues Band)
- 1986: Handmade (solo)
- 1986: Guitars, Cadillacs, Etc., Etc. (with Dwight Yoakam)
- 1985: Hard Line (with The Blasters)
- 1984: Streets of Fire - Original Movie Soundtrack (2 songs with The Blasters that are featured in the movie of the same name)
- 1983: Thank You Baby (with James Harman)
- 1983: Non-Fiction (with The Blasters)
- 1982: Over There (live, with The Blasters)
- 1981: This Band Just Won't Behave (with James Harman)
- 1981: The Blasters (with The Blasters)
