= Sir Douglas Quintet =

American rock band

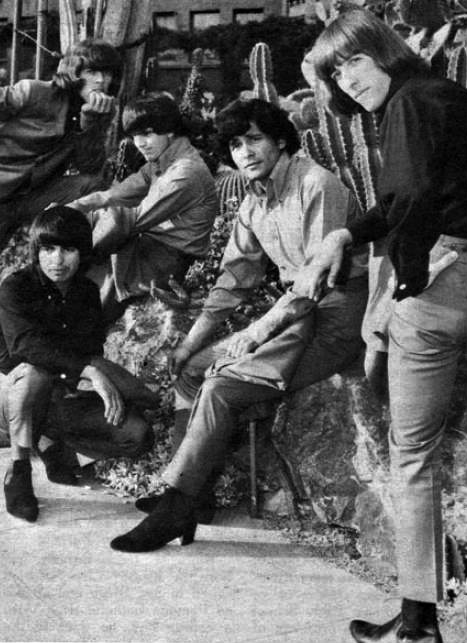
- Sir Douglas Quintet in 1965

Background information
- Origin: San Antonio, Texas, U.S.
- Genres: Tex-Mex; country rock; garage rock; progressive country
- Years active: 1964–1973
- Labels: Tribe; Smash; Philips; Mercury
- Past members: See members section

The Sir Douglas Quintet was an American country and rock band formed in San Antonio, Texas, in 1964. With their first hits, they were acclaimed in their home state. When their career was established (subsequent to working with Texas record producer Huey Meaux), the band relocated to the West Coast. Their move coincided with the burgeoning San Francisco psychedelic rock scene of the mid 1960s to early 1970s. Overall, the quintet were exponents of good-times music with strong roots in blues and Texas-regional traditions. The band's songs were most noted for the instantly distinguishable organ sound of Augie Meyers' Vox Continental.

== Group's origins ==
Doug Sahm, a veteran of the professional music scene who first sang on radio at the age of five, formed the Quintet (first called simply "Sir Douglas") in 1964 with longtime friend Augie Meyers and the other original members, Jack Barber, Frank Morin, and Johnny Perez. Sahm had started in country music and had played (at age eleven) on-stage with Hank Williams, Sr. during the latter's final performance. Sahm went on to play in blues clubs in his teenage years and had gained experience as a band leader.

The initial success of the new group, the Quintet, on the airwaves and sales charts was achieved when they made records in conjunction with Houston music producer Huey P. Meaux. Houston's recording industry had become the center of Texas R&B music.

The Quintet was born in a cross-cultural south Texas musical melting pot that included the sounds and traditions of Mexico, Ireland, Scotland, Appalachia, Bohemia, Poland, Czechoslovakia, Germany, and African-America. Aware of major trends, producer Huey Meaux advised connecting the new group with the English pop-music trend. As a consequence, the Texas-local R&B, Tex-Mex, and other veins the musicians were familiar with initially went through a period of influence by the British pop bands of the early and mid 1960s. For a short while, the youthful members of the group emulated Beatles-like "mop-top" demeanor and antics on stage. However, they soon outgrew these trappings.

== Best known tracks ==
The Quintet is perhaps best known for the 1965 hit single "She's About a Mover" written by Doug Sahm. The song, which has a 12-bar blues structure, was once named the number one 'Texas' song by Texas Monthly. With an infectious Vox Continental organ riff provided by Augie Meyers and soulful vocals from Sahm, the track has a Tex-Mex sound. The regional smash became a breakaway hit, and the recording was used in the soundtracks of the films Echo Park (1986), American Boyfriends (1989), The Doors (1991), Riding in Cars with Boys (2001), Sorority Boys (2002), and Beautiful Darling (2010). The Quintet's recordings were used as well in the soundtracks of other films, such as Cisco Pike and An Officer and a Gentleman.

In addition to "She's About a Mover," the band is known for its songs "The Rains Came" (1966), "Mendocino" (1968), "It Didn't Even Bring Me Down" (1969), and "Dynamite Woman" (1969). "Mendocino" was released in December 1968 and reached No. 27 in the U.S. Billboard Hot 100 by early 1969, spending 15 weeks in the chart. It was more successful in Europe, selling over three million copies there. The track was featured in the generally highly regarded film High Fidelity, starring John Cusack and Jack Black. Having made considerable musical impact, the Quintet at one point went on to share the same European bill as the Beach Boys and the Rolling Stones.In 1983, Sahm and Augie Meyers signed with the Swedish Sonet label, and made several extensive European tours that revitalized their careers. The single "Meet Me In Stockholm" from their Midnight Sun LP went platinum and was one of the biggest selling records ever in Scandinavia. "We were having riots on stage," said Doug. "Swedish chicks (were) running up on stage, knocking me over, ripping my clothes."

== Style ==
The Quintet played varied styles with an instrumental lineup that was typical of blues bands: one guitarist, keyboardist, bassist, and drummer, and a member who could play either trumpet or saxophone. Despite the blues band lineup and a musical influence from the blues, the Quintet's live sets did not overemphasize misery or tension in the lyrical content or musical feeling of the songs. In their sets and on record, the Quintet included such blues classics as "I Don't Believe" (originally by Bobby Blue Bland) along with the upbeat "Hey Little Girl" (originally by Texas blues man Frankie Lee Sims) and "T-Bone Shuffle" (originally by blues giant T-Bone Walker).

"The hallmark of Doug Sahm's warm, reliable, steady-rocking Tex-Mex is that it always sounds like you've heard it before—not the lyrics, which Doug just jotted down on some rolling papers five minutes ago, but the riffs. This can drive you crazy ... When the mood is right, though, it gives the music a kind of folkish inevitability that doesn't get boring because Tex-Mex is such a stew of influences."

— Christgau's Record Guide: Rock Albums of the Seventies (1981)

The Sir Douglas Quintet is considered a pioneering influence in the history of rock and roll for incorporating Tex-Mex and Cajun styles into rock music. However, early influences on the band's emerging Texas style were of course broader than this, and included ethnic and pop music from the 1950s and 1960s, such as doo-wop, electric blues, soul music, and British Invasion.

In the mid-1960s, the band relocated to the San Francisco Bay Area and absorbed features of the nascent San Francisco Sound, including the electric bass and freer percussion and guitar stylings. Band members also explored musical elements specific to modern jazz. For studio recordings, they sometimes added an extra session musician or two, often to flesh out the brass dimension of a track's sound. Good examples of what they produced by absorbing the new jazz and psychedelic elements into their music can be found on the album Sir Douglas Quintet + 2. The lyrics in a Quintet song such as "The Song of Everything" are plainly in the realm of the mystical, whimsical lyrics regarded as one of the characteristics of psychedelic music.

In live performances, blues, often with swing or shuffle beats, was usually a substantial component of the set. Besides doing their own original material, the Quintet revived several classics such as Jimmie Rodgers' "In the Jailhouse Now" and Freddy Fender's "Wasted Days and Wasted Nights" to be found on the albums Son of San Antonio (originally on The Best of The Sir Douglas Quintet, 1966) and Texas Fever (originally on The Return of Doug Saldana, 1971), respectively.

In 2005, they were among the new class of musicians nominated for induction into the Rock and Roll Hall of Fame for the 2006 induction ceremony.

== Members ==
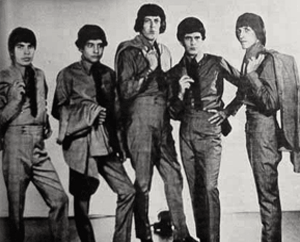
Portrait of the Sir Douglas Quintet. (L-R) Johnny Perez, Frank Morin, Augie Meyers, Jack Barber, Doug Sahm.

In addition to Sahm and Meyers, original Sir Douglas Quintet members included Jack Barber on bass; Frank Morin on saxophone, trumpet, and keyboards; and Johnny Perez, Ernie Durawa, or T.J. Ritterbach on drums. Martin Fierro joined the band on tenor sax in 1968. In 1969 Harvey Kagan joined the Quintet on bass, forming their most familiar line up – Kagan, Morin, Perez, Sahm, and Meyers. Bassist Jim Stallings also contributed to several albums during this period of shifting personnel which included, among others, guitarist Tom Nay of Sarasota, Florida, (who played with the group for about a year) and John York, who later replaced Chris Hillman in The Byrds, and contributions from San Antonio crooner/saxophonist Danny Segovia. Sahm and Meyers were later also members of the Texas Tornados (with Freddy Fender and Flaco Jiménez) in the early 1990s. Frank Morin and Martin Fierro both appeared on the first Mother Earth album Living With the Animals (1968).

In 1972, the group split up when Sahm contracted to produce a solo album. Meyers, Perez, Morin, and Stallings briefly regrouped as The Quintet, with Sonny Farlow taking Sahm's place. In 1973, several Sir Douglas Quintet outtakes were released in their final album from the group's classic era, Rough Edges.

Sahm and Meyers continued to work together throughout the late 1970s, and rejoined with Perez in 1980 for a reunion tour and album. Throughout the 1980s and 1990s, the band was joined by Louie Ortega, formerly of the 1960s band Louie & the Lovers and currently of the Texas Tornados.

Founder Doug Sahm died of a heart attack in his sleep in a motel room in Taos, New Mexico, on November 18, 1999, at the age of 58.

Johnny Perez owned Topanga Skyline Studios, with "the vibe and the magic of the '70s". Skyline's grand woodwork, welcoming business culture, and "western fort" dirt courtyard set the stage for drummer Perez to mentor and inspire generations of young artists – until his death on September 11, 2012, at the age of 69, in a California hospital, from complications of cirrhosis.

Harvey Kagan performed with a San Antonio area wedding/event band, The Oh So Good! Band, best known for discovering American Idol contestant Haley Scarnato. Kagan died on July 5, 2019, aged 73.

Frank Morin remained active in music, with teaching, production, and film soundtrack work. He died on December 4, 2020, in Monett, Missouri.

Augie Meyers toured and recorded on his own independent record labels, based in Bulverde, Texas until his death on March 7, 2026.

Jim Stallings lives in Albuquerque, New Mexico, where he plays bass, guitar, and keyboards at local Pro-Jam sessions. He is also in the process of writing his autobiography with heavy emphasis on his time with the Sir Douglas Quintet and the effect that experience had on his life.

== Selected discography ==
=== Albums ===
- 1966 – The Best of Sir Douglas Quintet (Tribe) (Contains 6 previously released A & B-side singles, plus 6 tracks recorded in 1965)
- 1968 – Sir Douglas Quintet + 2 = Honkey Blues (Smash)
- 1969 – Mendocino (Smash)
- 1970 – Together After Five (Smash)
- 1970 – 1+1+1=4 (Philips)
- 1971 – The Return of Doug Saldaña (Philips)
- 1972 – Future Tense (as simply The Quintet) without Doug Sahm
- 1973 – Rough Edges (Mercury)
- 1975 – Reunion of The Cosmic Brothers (Crazy Cajun) LIVE SDQ with Freddy Fender, Roky Erickson at Armadillo World HQ
- 1977 – Live Love (Texas Re-Cord Co.) recorded at Armadillo World HQ, Austin, Texas in 1977
- 1978 – The Tracker (Crazy Cajun)
- 1978 – Don Goldie & The Sir Douglas Quintet (Crazy Cajun)
- 1979 – Wanted: Very Much Alive (Sonet, UK) same 1977 LIVE material as "Live Love"
- 1980 – Motive (Mercury, W. Germany) "Sir Douglas Quintett" spelled with a double "t" at the end(?) on cover and labels
- 1981 – Border Wave (Takoma)
- 1981 – The Tracker (UDL 2343) white cover unauthorized LP release
- 1981 – Quintessence (Varrick)
- 1982 – Still Growing (Sonet, Sweden) Augie Meyers with Doug Sahm
- 1983 – Live Texas Tornado (Takoma)
- 1983 – Midnight Sun (Sonet)
- 1984 – Rio Medina (Sonet)
- 1985 – Luv Ya' Europa (Sonet)
- 1994 – Day Dreaming at Midnight (Elektra / Nonesuch)
- 1998 – S. D. Q. '98 (Watermelon) with The Gourds
- 2006 – Live from Austin, Texas (New West) 1981 LIVE recordings from Austin City Limits TV show
- 2007 – Live from Austin, Texas (New West) 1975 LIVE recordings from Austin City Limits TV show
- 2013 – Nuevo Wave Live (Fuel Records) Re-release of "Live Texas Tornado"
- 2018 – Live From Austin, TX (180 g Limited Edition New West Records 2LP) Recorded Live January 21, 1981, at Austin City Limits

=== Compilation albums ===
- 1969 – The Best of The Sir Douglas Quintet (DBI)
- 1970 – What About Tomorrow? (Mercury, Switzerland)
- 1975 – Pop Gold (Oval, W. Germany)
- 1980 – The Best of the Sir Douglas Quintet (Takoma)
- 1986 – The Collection (Castle Communication, UK) reissue of 2 Takoma LP releases
- 1988 – Sir Doug's Recording Trip: The Mercury Years (Edsel)
- 1988 – Spotlight (Sonet)
- 1990 – The Best of Doug Sahm & the Sir Douglas Quintet 1968–1975 (Mercury)
- 1994 – Collection (San Juan Music Group) 22 LIVE tracks from all eras of Doug Sahm performances
- 1994 – KGSR Broadcasts Vol. 2 (KGSR) 1 live track by the SDQ + other artists
- 2000 – The Best of the Sir Douglas Quintet (Sundazed / Beat Rocket)
- 2004 – Prime of Sir Douglas Quintet: The Best of the Tribe Recordings (Westside)
- 2005 – The Complete Mercury Masters (Hip-O Select)
- 2008 – Scandinavian Years (Universal Music, Norway)
- 2011 – The Mono Singles '68-'72 (Sundazed)

=== Singles ===
Year	Title	US	UK	AU	CA	DE	Label
1965	"She's About a Mover"	13	15	21	8	-	Tribe
1965	"The Tracker"	105	-	95	-	-	Tribe
1965	"In Time"	-	-	-	-	-	Tribe
1966	"The Rains Came"	31	-	-	19	-	Tribe
1966	"Quarter to Three"	129	-	-	-	-	Tribe
1966	"Beginning of the End"	-	-	-	-	-	Tribe
1966	"She Digs My Love"	132	-	-	-	-	Tribe
1968	"Are Inlaws Really Outlaws?"	-	-	-	-	-	Smash
1968	"Mendocino"	27	-	15	14	2	Smash
1969	"It Didn't Even Bring Me Down"	108	-	-	-	-	Smash
1968	"Dynamite Woman"	83	-	41	75	7	Smash
1969	"At the Crossroads"	104	-	-	-	-	Smash
1970	"Nuevo Laredo"	-	-	74	-	24	Smash
1971	"Wasted Days and Wasted Nights"	-	-	-	-	-	Philips
1975	"Roll with the Punches"	-	-	-	-	-	Casablanca
1981	"Sheila Tequila" + 3 Others EP	-	-	-	-	-	Chrysalis
1983	"Meet Me in Stockholm"	-	-	-	-	-	Sonet

== Awards and legacy ==
- February 1965 – "She's About a Mover" was recorded at Houston's Gold Star Studios and peaked at No. 13 on the Billboard Hot 100 (June 5 1965) and No. 15 on the UK Singles Chart.
- 1983 – Ringo Starr covered "She's About a Mover" on his album Old Wave.
- 2015 – A feature-length documentary, Sir Doug & The Genuine Texas Cosmic Groove, premiered, chronicling Doug Sahm's life and music.
- 2016 – Their 1965 single "She's About a Mover" was inducted into the Grammy Hall of Fame
- October 18 2024 – "Concert Club: A Tribute to Doug Sahm", featuring his son Shawn Sahm, was held at Austin's Rollins Studio Theatre.

== See also ==
- Doug Sahm
- Texas Tornados
