= Augie Meyers =

American musician (1940–2026)

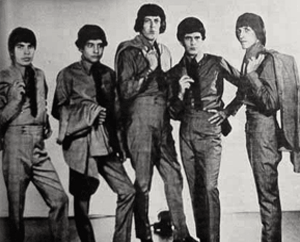
- Meyers (middle) in the Sir Douglas Quintet in 1966

Background information
- Also known as: Lord August
- Born: August Edmond George Meyer Jr. May 31, 1940; San Antonio, Texas, U.S.
- Died: March 7, 2026 (aged 85) San Antonio, Texas, U.S.
- Genres: Garage rock; country rock; psychedelic rock; rock; soul; folk; Tejano/Tex-Mex; country
- Occupations: Musician; record producer; record label owner
- Instruments: Keyboards; guitar; accordion; vocals
- Formerly of: Sir Douglas Quintet; Texas Tornados
- Website: augiemeyers.com

August Edmond George Meyer Jr. (May 31, 1940 – March 7, 2026), known professionally as Augie Meyers, was an American musician, songwriter, studio musician, record producer and record label owner. He is perhaps best known as a founding member of the Sir Douglas Quintet and the Texas Tornados.

== Life and career ==
Meyers was born August Edmond George Meyer Jr. in San Antonio, Texas, United States on May 31, 1940. In the early 1960s, Meyers and Doug Sahm founded the Sir Douglas Quintet. His Vox organ was a familiar element of the group's sound, as heard on tracks like "She's About a Mover" (1964), "Mendocino" (1969), and "Nuevo Laredo" (1970).

In the 1990s, Meyers co-founded the successful supergroup known as the Texas Tornados with Doug Sahm, Flaco Jiménez, and Freddy Fender.

From the 1970s on, Meyers operated several of his own record labels, including the Texas Re-Cord Company (co-founded with Lucky Tomblin), Superbeet Records, White Boy Records, and El Sendero.

As a studio musician, Meyers played on numerous releases by other artists, including Bob Dylan, John P. Hammond, Tom Jones, John & Mary, Tom Waits, Raul Malo, and Doug Sahm.

Meyers lived in the Texas Hill Country town of Bulverde. He died from pneumonia at his home in San Antonio on March 7, 2026, at the age of 85. At the time of his death he was the last survivor of the four original members of The Texas Tornados.

== Select album discography ==
- 1971: The Western Head Music Co. (Polydor)
- 1972: You Ain't Rollin' Your Roll Rite (Paramount)
- 1975: Live At The Longneck (Texas Re-Cord Company)
- 1977: Finally In Lights (Texas Re-Cord Company)
- 1982: Still Growin (Sonet)
- 1984: August in New York (Sonet)
- 1986: Augie's Back (Sonet)
- 1986: My Main Squeeze (Superbeet)
- 1988: Sausalito Sunshine (Superbeet)
- 1992: White Boy (White Boy)
- 1996: Alive & Well At Lake Taco (White Boy)
- 2002: Blame It On Love (Texas World)
- 2006: My Freeholies Ain't Free Anymore (El Sendero)
- 2013: Loves Lost and Found (El Sendero)

== Select collaborations ==
- 1991: John and Mary, Victory Gardens (Rykodisc)
- 1997: Bob Dylan, Time Out Of Mind (Columbia)
- 2001: Bob Dylan, Love And Theft (Columbia)
- 2005: John P. Hammond, In Your Arms Again (Back Porch)
- 2014: Ben Vaughn, Texas Roadtrip (Many Moods)
- 2021: The Mal Thursday Quintet, If 6 Was 5 (Chunk Archives Recordings)
