= Leviathan (disambiguation) =

Leviathan is a Biblical sea monster.

Leviathan may also refer to:

== Entertainment and media ==
=== Books ===
- Leviathan (Hobbes book), a 1651 book of political philosophy by Thomas Hobbes
- Leviathan (Auster novel), 1992, by Paul Auster
- Leviathan (Westerfeld novel), 2009, by Scott Westerfeld
- Leviathan, a 1975 novel in The Illuminatus! Trilogy by Robert Anton Wilson and Robert Shea
- Leviathan: The Unauthorised Biography of Sydney, a 1999 book by John Birmingham
- Leviathan, a 2007 book by Eric Jay Dolin about whaling
- Leviathan, or The Whale, a 2008 book by Philip Hoare
- Leviathan and Its Enemies, a 1995 manuscript by Samuel T. Francis published posthumously in 2016

=== Comics ===
- Leviathan (2000 AD), by Ian Edginton and D'Israeli
- Leviathan (comic book), by John Layman
- Leviathan (comic strip), by Peter Blegvad

=== Fictional entities ===
- Leviathan (DC Comics), a terrorist organization the DC Universe against Batman and his allies
- Leviathan, an omnipresent being in the Hellraiser franchise
- Leviathan (Digimon)
- Leviathan (Farscape), a species of sapient spaceships in the Farscape television series
- Leviathan (Marvel Comics), a Soviet counterpart to HYDRA
- Leviathan, a boss from the 2020 video game Ultrakill

=== Film and television ===
- Leviathan (1961 film), a French drama film
- Leviathan (1989 film), a science fiction/horror film
- Leviathan (2012 film), a North American fishing industry film
- Leviathan (2014 film), a Russian film directed by Andrey Zvyagintsev
- Leviathan (TV series), an anime series adaptation based on the novel by Scott Westerfeld
- "Leviathan" (Harsh Realm), an episode of the television series Harsh Realm
- "Leviathan" (Helstrom), an episode of Helstrom
- "Leviathan" (Legends of Tomorrow), an episode of the television series Legends of Tomorrow
- "The Leviathan" (Elementary), an episode of the television series Elementary

=== Games ===
- Leviathan: The Last Day of the Decade, a video game by Lostwood Games
- Leviathan: The Last Defense, a Japanese mobile game later adapted into the 2013 anime Zettai Bōei Leviathan
- Mass Effect 3: Leviathan, a DLC pack for the video game Mass Effect 3
- Leviathan (Devil May Cry), a massive demon from Devil May Cry 3
- Leviathan, the name of the first raid released in the video game Destiny 2
- Leviathan, a 1987 video game from English Software
- Leviathan, a massive airborne organism from the video game Starcraft II
- Leviathan class organisms, a type of lifeform in the 2018 video game Subnautica

=== Music ===
==== Groups ====
- Leviathan (musical project), a solo artist black metal band from San Francisco
- Leviathan, a late 1960s British rock band previously known as the Mike Stuart Span
- The New Leviathan Oriental Fox-Trot Orchestra, dance band from New Orleans

==== Albums ====
- Leviathan (Mastodon album), a 2004 album by American progressive/sludge metal band Mastodon
- Leviathan (Therion album), a 2021 album by Swedish symphonic metal band Therion

==== Songs ====
- "Leviathan" (Manic Street Preachers song)
- "Leviathan" (Esprit D'Air song), 2020
- "Leviathan", by Leathermouth from XO, 2009
- "Leviathan", by Impellitteri from Stand in Line, 1988

=== Other media ===
- Dave Bautista, WWE wrestler (former stage name "Leviathan")

== Science and technology ==
- 8813 Leviathan, a main belt asteroid
- Leviathan (cipher), a stream cipher
- Leviathan, junior synonym of the genus Mammut, or mastodons
- Leviathan gas field in the Eastern Mediterranean
- Leviathan of Parsonstown, a telescope in Birr, Ireland
- Leviathan Patera, a depression on Neptune's moon Triton
- Livyatan melvillei (formerly Leviathan melvillei), a species of extinct whale

== Transport ==
- Leviathan (1849), the first train ferry
- 5704 Leviathan, a British LMS Jubilee Class steam locomotive
- HMS Leviathan, several ships
- INS Leviathan, several ships
- SS Great Eastern, a 19th-century ocean liner, once called Leviathan
- SS Leviathan, a 20th-century ocean liner
- Leviathan (locomotive), an American 4-4-0 steam locomotive owned by the Central Pacific Railroad

== Other uses ==
- Leviathan (clothing), an Australian sportswear brand
- Leviathan (cross-stitch), a type of cross-stitch
- Leviathan (Canada's Wonderland), a roller coaster at Canada's Wonderland
- Leviathan (Gold Coast, Australia), a wooden roller coaster at Sea World in Australia
- Leviathan (horse), a racehorse
- Leviathan gas field, a natural gas field in the Mediterranean Sea near Israel
- Leviathan, a line of high-alcohol beers from Harpoon Brewery
- Leviathan Movement, a far-right Serbian organization
