= Hot Tamale (disambiguation) =

Hot Tamale may refer to:

- Hot Tamales, a brand of cinnamon candy
- Hot Tamale, a 2006 American film
- Hot tamale, a type of tamale originating in the Mississippi Delta area that is spicy and is made from corn meal instead of masa
- Hot tamale, a term for a sloppy joe in use in the Sheboygan, Wisconsin area
- HOT Tamale, a bicycle tour, held annually on the first Saturday in June, in Marion County, Ohio. The name derives from Heart of Ohio Tailwinds (the name of the sponsoring bicycling club) Tour Around Marion at Low Elevation

== See also ==
- Tamale
- Hot Tamale Baby, a 1985 blues album by Macia Ball
- "Hot Tamale Alley", an 1896 song written by May Irwin
- Hot Tamale Brass Band
- "Hot tamale train", a recurring phrase on So You Think You Can Dance
- Here Comes the Hot Tamale Man, an album by The New Leviathan Oriental Fox-Trot Orchestra
