= Presumed Innocent =

Presumed Innocent may refer to:

- Presumption of innocence, a legal principle
- Presumed Innocent (novel), a 1987 novel by Scott Turow
  - Presumed Innocent (film), a 1990 adaptation of the novel, directed by Alan J. Pakula
  - Presumed Innocent (TV series), a 2024 miniseries adaptation of the novel, created by David E. Kelley
- "Presumed Innocent" (The Bill), a 1996 TV episode
- "Presumed Innocent" (Judging Amy), a 1999 TV episode
- Presumed Innocent (album), by Marcia Ball, 2001
