= So Many Rivers =

So Many Rivers may refer to:

- So Many Rivers (Bobby Womack album), 1985
- So Many Rivers (Marcia Ball album), 2003
