= Let Me Play with Your Poodle =

Let Me Play With Your Poodle may refer to:

- "Let Me Play with Your Poodle" (song), a 1942 hokum blues song by Tampa Red
- Let Me Play with Your Poodle (album), a 1997 blues album by Marcia Ball
