= Yuiko Tatsumi =

Japanese voice actress (born 1987)

- 巽 悠衣子
- Born: September 17, 1987 (age 38); Osaka Prefecture, Japan
- Occupation: Voice actress
- Years active: 2008–present
- Agent: I'm Enterprise
- Children: 2

Yuiko Tatsumi (巽 悠衣子, Tatsumi Yuiko; born September 17, 1987) is a Japanese voice actress. She is affiliated with I'm Enterprise.

== Personal life ==
Tatsumi has been married to a man outside the entertainment industry since 2017. They have two children, a son born in 2022, and a second child born in 2024.

== Filmography ==
=== Anime series ===
2009

- K-ON! (Student)
- The Girl Who Leapt Through Space (Mitchan)

2010

- Ōkami-san & Her Seven Companions (Saitou's)
- Kiss×sis (Riko Suminoe)
- K-ON! (First Year Student)
- Chu-Bra!! (Clerk, Female Student, Student, Suzuki)

2011

- The IDOLM@STER (Child A)
- Heaven's Memo Pad (Vocalist)
- Zoobles! (Coron)
- The Qwaser of Stigmata II (Ayame Satsuki)
- Softenni (Azusa Mizumori, Female Student)
- Hanasaku Iroha (Motoko, Student A, Student C)

2012

- Upotte!! (Fara)
- Campione! (Pandora)
- Koi to Senkyo to Chocolate (Schoolgirl A)
- Saki Episode of Side A (Riko Yasufuku, Hitomi Ezaki)
- Joshiraku (Fund-Raising Student)
- Say "I love you." (Girl)
- Muv-Luv Alternative: Total Eclipse (Imperial Army Soldier F, Soldier)
- High School DxD (Mittelt)
- Hidamari Sketch × Honeycomb (Arisawa's friend, Cafeteria lady, Female student A, Female teacher, Girl D)
- Bodacious Space Pirates (April Lambert)
- Little Busters! (Mio Nishizono)
- Lagrange - The Flower of Rin-ne (Emiri Nozu)

2013

- Cuticle Detective Inaba (Noah)
- Day Break Illusion (Ginka Shirokane)
- Leviathan: The Last Defense (Ninja)
- Tamako Market (Committee Chairman)
- Angel's Drop (Hibachi)
- Problem Children Are Coming from Another World, Aren't They? (Leticia Draculair)
- Ro-Kyu-Bu! SS (Mayumi Odaka, Nobue Okuda)

2014

- Witch Craft Works (Gibraltar)
- Daimidaler the Sound Robot (Humboldt, Reporter)
- Selector Infected Wixoss (Honoka)
- Narihero www (Prato Bon)
- No-Rin (Announcer)
- The Irregular at Magic High School (Shizuku Kitayama)

2015

- Etotama (Shima)
- Charlotte (Nomura)
- Tantei Team KZ Jiken Note (Aya Tachibana)
- Durarara!!×2 Shō (Tsukiyama)
- Durarara!! ×2 The Second Arc (Girl)
- Ultimate Otaku Teacher (Miho Kitō)
- Dog Days" (Jonu Crafty, Kanata)

2017

- Classroom of the Elite (Haruka Hasebe)
- The Irregular at Magic High School: The Movie – The Girl Who Summons the Stars (Shizuku Kitayama)

2018

- Uma Musume Pretty Derby (Hishi Amazon)

2020

- The Irregular at Magic High School: Visitor Arc (Shizuku Kitayama)
- Dropout Idol Fruit Tart (Tone Honmachi)
- Wandering Witch: The Journey of Elaina (Sister)

2021

- The Honor Student at Magic High School (Shizuku Kitayama)

2022

- Classroom of the Elite 2nd Season (Haruka Hasebe)

2023

- By the Grace of the Gods 2nd Season (Miyabi)

=== Original video animation ===
2008

- Kiss×sis (Riko Suminoe)

2012

- Holy Knight (Chizuru Makimura)
- Otome wa Boku ni Koishiteru: Futari no Elder (Utano Sasō)

=== Video games ===
- Blue Roses: Yousei to Aoi Hitomi no Senshitachi
- Hyperdevotion Noire: Goddess Black Heart
- Granblue Fantasy (Philosophia)
- Hyrule Warriors (Agitha)
- Sword Art Online: Hollow Realization (Premiere)
- Sword Art Online: Fatal Bullet (Premiere)
- Azur Lane (Bremerton, Asashio)
- Tokyo 7th Sisters (Mimori Matsuri)
- Umamusume: Pretty Derby (Hishi Amazon)

=== Drama CD ===
- My Little Monster (Asako Natsume)
