= What's a Girl to Do? (disambiguation) =

"What's a Girl to Do?" is a music single by Australian band Sister2Sister. It may also refer to:

== Music ==
- "What's a Girl to Do?", a song from the album Fur and Gold by Bat for Lashes
- "What's a Girl to Do?", a song from the album Ear to the Street by The Conscious Daughters
- "What's a Girl to Do", a song from the album Sleep It Off by Cristina
- "What's a Girl to Do", a single by Annette Funicello
- "What's a Girl to Do", a single by Bas Bron
- "What's a Girl to Do", a song from the album Gatorhythms by Marcia Ball
- "What's a Girl to Do", a song from the self-titled album Toya (album) by Toya
- "Take Good Care of My Baby / What's a Girl to Do", a song from the album Keeping Time by Paul Jabara

== Other ==
- What's a Girl to Do?, a solo poetry performance by Deidre Rubenstein
- What's a Girl to Do?, a book in the Girls of Canby Hall series, written by Julie Garwood
- What's a Girl to Do?, a novel by Tyne O'Connell
