= Day Break Illusion =

Japanese anime television series

- Promotional poster of Day Break Illusion.

幻影ヲ駆ケル太陽 - il sole penetra le illusioni (Gen'ei o Kakeru Taiyō)
- Genre: Magical girl
- Created by: Haruyasu Akagi; Hidenori Tanaka
- Light novel
- Written by: Michiko Itō
- Illustrated by: Gomoku Akatsuki
- Published by: Kadokawa Shoten
- Original run: June 10, 2013 – October 10, 2013
- Manga
- Written by: sole;viola
- Illustrated by: Kōki Katō
- Published by: Square Enix
- Magazine: Gangan Online
- Original run: June 27, 2013 – February 20, 2014
- Volumes: 4
- Anime television series
- Directed by: Keizō Kusakawa; Assistant director: Harume Kosaka
- Produced by: Haruyasu Akagi; Kazuhiro Asō; Tsuyoshi Oda; Ayako Yokoyama; Masayuki Nishide; Fuminori Tanaka
- Written by: Michiko Itō
- Music by: Tatsuya Kato
- Studio: AIC
- Licensed by: NA: Aniplex of America
- Original network: Tokyo MX, BS11 ABC, tvk, TV Aichi
- Original run: July 6, 2013 – September 28, 2013
- Episodes: 13 + OVA

Day Break Illusion - il sole penetra le illusioni (幻影ヲ駆ケル太陽, Gen'ei o Kakeru Taiyō; "The Sun That Penetrates Illusions") is an original anime series produced by AIC and Aniplex. The series aired in Japan between July and September 2013, and was simulcast by Crunchyroll. A manga adaptation was serialized in the June 2013 issue of Square Enix's online magazine Gangan Online. A light novel adaptation written by Michiko Itō with illustrations by Gomoku Akatsuki was serialized from June 10, 2013, in the monthly magazine Newtype, published by Kadokawa Shoten. The story follows a group of magical girls whose powers and personalities are based on the Major Arcana as they fight monsters born from humans that succumbed to despair.

== Plot ==
In a world plagued by the Daemonia, creatures that take advantage of the negative emotions of people and transform them into monsters, girls from 22 special bloodlines are chosen to wield the power of the Elemental Tarot and confront them. The story follows Akari Taiyo, a twelve-year-old girl who becomes the wielder of card "The Sun" and joins the mysterious organization "Sefiro Fiore" to confront the Daemonia along other card wielders. However, it does not take long for Akari to learn that with their duty comes an unbearable guilt, as to defeat the Daemonia, the humans afflicted by them must perish as well.

== Characters ==
=== Main characters ===
Akari Taiyo (太陽 あかり, Taiyō Akari)
Voiced by: Mai Kadowaki
Akari is a cheerful and upbeat twelve-year-old girl who aims to be a fortune-teller like her late mother, making use of the Tarot deck inherited from her. Her card is "The Sun" and she fights wielding a flaming rapier. Thanks to the power of her card, plants close to her tend to grow at an accelerated rate. She soon gains the ability to hear a Daemonia's thoughts, which is transferred to others via touch, and that ability is revealed to be because her father had been possessed by a Daemonia. She is twelve years old.
Luna Tsukuyomi (月詠 るな, Tsukuyomi Runa)
Voiced by: Sora Tokui
Luna is a shy girl who fights summoning magic vines and has healing powers. Her card is "The Moon." She seems to be best friends with Akari, which appears to have stemmed from her admiration of her missing twin sister, Serena, and becomes jealous when Akari grows close with others. When Luna leaves Sefiro Fiore after Ginka's disappearance, Cerebrum poses as Akari in order to get close to her, forcing a Diabolic Tarot card into her body, turning her into a demonic wolf hybrid, but she regains her humanity after Akari makes a deal with Cerebrum. Afterwards she gains the ability to turn her fingers into wolf claws. She is twelve years old.
Seira Hoshikawa (星河 せいら, Hoshikawa Seira)
Voiced by: Eri Kitamura
Seira is a calm, yet strict girl who fights with an icy bow and arrow. She has a firm hatred of Daemonia after her childhood friend, Manami, was killed by one of them. Her card is "The Star". She is thirteen years old.
Ginka Shirokane (白金 ぎんか, Shirokane Ginka)
Voiced by: Yuiko Tatsumi
Ginka is an easygoing and laid-back girl who can summon coins which convert into a sword, an axe, shields and other weapons. She has a strong sense of justice and speaks in a kansai accent. Her card is "Temperance". She is thirteen years old. Her father mentions that Ginka's aunt held the Power of the Temperance card prior to Ginka. She disappears when she destroys her counterpart Daemonia, and returns in episode 12 to save Seira and Luna after hearing Akari's voice.

=== Sefiro Fiore Nagataki Branch ===
Etia Visconti (エティア・ヴィスコンティ, Etia Visukonti)
Voiced by: Aya Endō
The head of the Sefiro Fiore Nagataki Branch, she has a kind and polite attitude and is the literature teacher. She follows the order of the Sefiro Fiore, but often doesn't agree with them, wanting to put her students first. Her card is "The World".
Ariel Valtiel Westcott (アリエル・ヴァルティエル・ウェストコット, Arieru Varutieru Wesutokotto)
Voiced by: Kikuko Inoue
The deputy head of the Sefiro Fiore Nagataki Branch, she has a strict demeanor. Her card is "Judgement" and she is the P.E. teacher.
Priscilla Twilight (プリシラ・トワイライト, Purishira Towairaito)
Voiced by: Ruriko Aoki
A woman armed with magic daggers. Her card is "The Fool" and she is the music teacher.
Meltina Melvis (メルティナ・メルヴィス, Merutina Meruvisu)
Voiced by: Nao Tōyama
A woman armed with an artifact resembling a Jack-o'-lantern. Her card is "The Magician" and she is the chemistry teacher.
Itsuki Tendo (天道 いつき, Tendō Itsuki) , Mutsumi Tendo (天道 むつみ, Tendō Mutsumi) andNanase Tendo (天道 ななせ, Tendō Nanase)
Voiced by: Atsumi Tanezaki
Three homunculus girls who work at the command center of the Sefiro Fiore Nagataki Branch. They conduct various research experiments and use a dimensional device to send the Elemental Tarot users to the location of a Daemonia attack. Their card is "Wheel of Fortune".
Laplace (ラプラス, Rapurasu)
Voiced by: Chado Horii
A talking crow who provides counseling to Etia.
Schrödinger (シュレティンガー, Shuretingā)
Voiced by: Shiori Izawa
A talking cat and Laplace' companion.

=== Other characters ===
Fuyuna Shinzaki (心崎 冬菜, Shinzaki Fuyuna)
Voiced by: Ayane Sakura
Akari's cousin. She is a bookish honors student whose jealousy of Akari for the attention she gets for her fortune telling talent leads her to be possessed by a Daemonia. She transforms into a plant monster and is unwittingly killed by Akari, with her existence erased as if she never existed.
Hinata Taiyo (太陽 ひなた, Taiyō Hinata)
Voiced by: Aya Hisakawa
Akari's late mother and a fortune teller. She was a member of Sefiro Fiore and the previous wielder of "The Sun". For some reason, she did not teach her daughter to use her powers as she wanted her to live a normal life. She is the protagonist of the light novel prequel.
Mama Nagataki (永瀧の母, Nagataki no Haha)
Voiced by: Mao Uchino
A woman who works at Akari's fortune-teller shop.
Lymro (リムロ, Rimuro)
Voiced by: Minami Takahashi
A young woman who works with Mama Nagataki.
Hanayume (華夢)
Voiced by: Hironori Kondō
Another fortune teller who works with Mama Nagataki.
Yatarou Shirokane (白金 弥太郎, Shirokane Yatarō)
Voiced by: Masuo Amada
Ginka's father who used to live in poverty with his daughter until he manages to get from rags to riches with a successful business and is now one of the sponsors of Sefiro Fiore's activities.
Cerebrum (ケルブレム, Keruberemu)
Voiced by: Takashi Kondō (male), Aya Suzaki (female), Ikumi Hayama (nurse), Misaki Kuno (little girl)
A shapeshifting villain who tempts people to become Daemonia in order to collect their souls.
Den'ichirō Hakama (袴 田一郎, Hakama Den'ichirō)
Voiced by: Kanehira Yamamoto
A corrupt politician Cerebrum aids from time to time.
Amelie Lamour (アメリー・ラムール, Amerī Ramūru)
A character from the light novel. She is a member of Sefiro Fiore and a comrade of Hinata, and her card is "The Lovers." She uses a crossbow in her Tenebrae form.
Hajime Takatori (高取 肇, Takatori Hajime)
A character from the light novel. He is a Daemonia researcher for Sefiro Fiore and is implied to be Akari's father.

== Media ==
=== Light novel ===
A light novel written by Michiko Itō and illustrated by Gomoku Akatsuki was serialized by Kadokawa Shoten in the magazine Newtype, and five chapters were published between June 10, 2013, and October 10, 2013. It is titled Gen'ei o Kakeru Taiyō: Scattered and Spilled Sand of Fate (幻影を駆ける太陽～こぼれ散るは運命の砂～, Gen'ei o Kakeru Taiyō: Kobore Chiru ha Unmei no Suna), and it is a prequel to the anime series, focusing on Akari's mother Hinata Taiyo.

A web novel titled The Silver That Dances in the Illusion (幻影に舞う白銀, Gen'ei ni Mau Hakugin) with illustrations by Ryu Knight was also serialized, and it focuses on Silvia Leonhart, wielder of the Justice card. A volume collecting the chapters was released along with a revised version of Scattered and Spilled Sands of Fate and a drama CD. A third web novel, titled Messiah of Illusion (幻影のメサイア, Genei no Messiah), serves as an epilogue and includes characters from both the television anime and The Silver That Dances in the Illusion web novel.

=== Manga ===
A manga adaptation illustrated by Kōki Katō began serialization in Square Enix's Gangan Online magazine on June 27, 2013, and ended on February 20, 2014. The sixteen chapters have been collected into four bound volumes, with the first being released on July 22, 2013, the second on September 27, 2013, and the third and fourth on March 22, 2014.

==== Volume list ====
No.	Japanese release date	Japanese ISBN
1	July 22, 2013	978-4757540095
01: "Akari Taiyo" (太陽 あかり, Taiyō Akari); 02: "Luna Tsukuyomi" (月詠 るな, Tsukuyomi Runa); 03: "Dark Spot of the Sun" (太陽の黒点, Taiyō no Kokuten); 04: "Sefiro Fiore" (セフィロ・フィオーレ)
2	September 27, 2013	978-4757540811
05: "The Blood-Soaked Future" (血塗られた未来, Chinurareta Mirai); 06: "Voices of Condolence" (とむらいの声, Tomurai no Koe); 07: "Is This a Painting?" (これは絵なのだろうか?, Kore wa E Nano Darō ka?); 08: "Ah, Money, Money! How Many Sad Things Must Occur in This World Due to Money?" (ああ、金、金! この金のためにどれほど多くの悲しいことがこの世に起こることであろうか!, Aa, Kane, Kane! Kono Kane no Tame ni Dorehodo Ōku no Kanashii koto ga Kono Yo ni Okoru koto de Arō ka!)
3	March 22, 2014	978-4757542457
09: "To the Ends with the Star" (星とともの果てに, Hoshi to Tomo no Hate ni); 10: "A Lovely Holiday" (華麗なる休暇, Karei Naru Kyūka); 11: "The Overflowing Water" (こぼれおちる水, Koboreochiru Mizu); 12: "The Moon's Light, The Sun's Shadow" (月の光、太陽の影, Tsuki no Hikari, Taiyō no Kage)
4	March 22, 2014	978-4757542464
13: "Like Burning Away" (燃え尽きるような, Moetsukiru Yōna); 14: "Your Path" (君のみち, Kimi no Michi); 15: "Choosing Your Destiny" (運命の選択, Unmei no Sentaku); 16: "The Sun's Smile" (太陽の微笑み, Taiyō no Hohoemi)

=== Radio show ===
A radio show to promote the series titled Gen'ei o Kakeru Radio (幻影ヲ駆ケルRadio) began broadcasting via the anime's official website on June 27, 2013. The show is hosted by Sora Tokui and Yuiko Tatsumi, who voice Luna and Ginka respectively.

=== Anime ===
An anime television series by AIC aired in Japan between July 6, 2013, and September 28, 2013, and was simulcast by Crunchyroll. The opening theme is "Träumerei" by Lisa and the ending theme is "Mirage" by Natsumi Okamoto. The series is licensed in North America by Aniplex of America. A fourteenth episode was streamed on Niconico on November 16, 2013, and was included with the fourth BD/DVD released on December 25, 2013.

==== Episode list ====
No.	Title	Original release date
1	"Dark Spot of the Sun"; Transliteration: "Taiyō no Kokuten" (Japanese: 太陽の黒点)	July 6, 2013
Akari Taiyo is a girl who takes after her late mother Hinata as an apprentice fortune-teller. She lives with her aunt and uncle, and her cousin Fuyuna Shinzaki, who is jealous of the attention Akari receives. One night, Akari has an apparent dream in which she is attacked by a giant plant monster, and sees herself as a magical girl killing it. When she awakens, she finds Fuyuna lying dead in her bedroom. The events of the previous day then repeat themselves; this time Fuyuna is completely absent, and Akari and her relatives appear to have no memory of her. Akari later goes to the fortune-telling house where she works to find it has been set ablaze by a middle-aged man, who transforms into a giant, flaming monster and attacks her. Akari transforms into a magical girl wielding the power of the Sun Tarot and fights back, but is overpowered and knocked unconscious. She is rescued by three other magical girls, who kill the monster and bring her out of the burning house.
2	"The Blood-Soaked Future"; Transliteration: "Chinurareta Mirai" (Japanese: 血塗られた未来)	July 13, 2013
Akari awakens at the Sefiro Fiore institution, where the headmaster Etia Visconti tells her about the organization's use of the Elemental Tarot in their ongoing battle against the Daemonia, monsters that possess humans overtaken by negative emotions. Akari moves to the school and meets her new teammates: Seira Hoshikawa, who wields the Star card; Luna Tsukuyomi, who wields the Moon card; and Ginka Shirokane, who wields the Temperance card. During a seemingly normal day of lessons, the girls are dispatched to kill a Daemonia. As Akari fights the monster, she regains her memories of Fuyuna and loses her transformation out of shock, forcing Luna to help her retreat while Seira and Ginka finish their duty. Etia explains to Akari that those possessed by Daemonia cannot be saved, and that everything pertaining to that person's existence is erased once they are killed. Filled with anger and guilt, Akari runs from the academy and cries in apology to her aunt, who still remembers nothing of Fuyuna. Later, Akari spots a possessed man attempting to kill a happy father and son, and becomes conflicted on whether to act or not.
3	"Voices of Condolence"; Transliteration: "Tomurai no Koe" (Japanese: とむらいの声)	July 20, 2013
Akari chooses to fight against the Daemonia to protect the innocent, but once again hesitates to finish it off. Priscilla Twilight and Meltina Melvis, wielders of the Fool and Magician cards, arrive to fight it. Akari hears the Daemonia's voice crying for help and stands against Priscilla and Meltina. The Daemonia escapes, and Akari is brought back to Sefiro Fiore and detained in a cell for her disobedience. The next day, Akari tells Etia and deputy head Ariel Valtiel Wescott about the voices she heard. The two hesitate to believe her, but let her out when she promises to fight again. Akari and her companions prevent the Daemonia from killing a kindergarten teacher and her students. Akari attempts to listen to the voice, which tells her that it no longer wants to kill and asks Akari to kill it, to which Akari reluctantly obliges. Akari accepts her destiny, though choosing to respect the wishes of those who are possessed, to Etia's approval.
4	"Is This a Painting?"; Transliteration: "Kore wa E Nano Darō ka?" (Japanese: これは絵なのだろうか?)	July 27, 2013
A young painter named Kiyone feels resentment towards a popular painter, Yume Hashiyagama. One night, Kiyone comes across a mysterious silver-haired fortune-teller named Cerebrum, who gives her a tarot card and tells her to be true to her feelings. The next day, when she sees Yume kissing the boy she has a crush on, she uses the power of the tarot card, which is revealed to be a Diablos Tarot card that creates Daemonia, in order to have Yume killed by a truck and take her fame at the art contest with a twisted piece of her own. Meanwhile, Akari becomes upset at Seira, who claims only weak people become possessed by Daemonia, lamenting that she was unable to help Fuyuna when she needed it. Driven further by the Daemonia's influence, Kiyone begins killing more of the people who had looked down on her, at which point Akari and the others are called to face her. As they fight, Luna also becomes able to hear the Daemonia's resentful thoughts by touching Akari, with Seira killing it off before Akari can hear her true feelings. Afterwards, as Akari reads a journal left behind by Fuyuna, Luna states she is grateful to be able to hear the Daemonia.
5	"Ah, Money, Money! How Many Sad Things Must Occur in This World Due to Money?"; Transliteration: "Aa, Kane, Kane! Kono Kane no Tame ni Dorehodo Ōku no Kanashii koto ga Kono Yo ni Okoru koto de Arō ka!" (Japanese: ああ、金、金! この金のためにどれほど多くの悲しいことがこの世に起こることであろうか!)	August 3, 2013
Ginka's father Yataro, who helps fund Sefiro Fiore's operations as thanks for helping his family out when they were in debt, comes to visit and invites the girls to a fancy party. While there, Ginka and Yataro hear about one of his old friends, Honda, who is facing financial struggles and is now in debt to loan sharks. That night, as Honda prepares to commit suicide, Cerebrum, this time taking the form of a young girl, gives Honda a Diablos Tarot card that he uses to kill the loan sharks and escape his debt. The next evening, Cerebrum instructs Honda to kill Yataro for possessing the Elemental Tarot user's blood, sending a wave of environmental hazards to attack him, but Akari and the others arrive to help him. Learning that the Daemonia is Honda, Ginka uses Akari's link to hear his thoughts, lamenting his weak heart. Realizing the only thing she can do for him is let him rest in peace, Ginka destroys the Daemonia. Being the only one left who remembers Honda, Ginka sympathizes with Akari's concerns.
6	"To the Ends with the Star"; Transliteration: "Hoshi to Tomo no Hate ni" (Japanese: 星とともの果てに)	August 10, 2013
Seira helps Priscilla and Meltina fight a pair of Daemonia, commending their teamwork while stating she has never considered her own group a team. Later, a pair of schoolgirls, Minori and Hanae, encounter Seira and Ginka and befriend them. After Minori ends up misplacing her phone in Seira's bag, they meet with her again, during which time Minori undergoes an attack caused by her heart problems. As Minori is hospitalized, Seira recalls how her old friend, Manami, was killed by a Daemonia. Meanwhile, Hanae is lured by the power of the Diablos Tarot card, using it to kill a compatible donor to allow Minori to have an operation. Back at Sefiro Fiore, Seira requests to join Priscilla's team, but she is convinced to give Akari's team one more chance. When she discovers Hanae has become a Daemonia, she agrees to use Akari's strength to listen to Hanae's voice, asking her to take care of Minori in her place. Seira hesitates to finish her off, but Akari convinces her that because they hear the Daemonia's voices, they must strengthen their resolve, allowing her to make the kill. With a hairpin Hanae bought with Seira the only thing left behind of her new friend, Seira gives it to Minori, who is able to undergo her surgery. Afterwards, Akari tells Seira about how she feels hearing the Daemonia's voice is important, while Seira confesses all of her insecurities to her.
7	"A Lovely Holiday"; Transliteration: "Karei Naru Kyūka" (Japanese: 華麗なる休暇)	August 17, 2013
Etia and Ariel are informed that the wielder of the Lovers card in Sefiro Fiore's Moscow branch has disappeared. Etia decides to give the girls a day off, not wanting to concern them with this development so quickly. As the girls tour the city, Akari and Seira become more friendly with each other, though Luna appears concerned. The girls meet Akari's old fortunetelling mentors Mama Nagasaki, Lymro, and Hanayume, who let them spend the night at their new home. Mama Nagasaki reads the girls' fortune, and predicts that their future will be filled with hardship and destruction. The girls affirm that they will be able to overcome any challenges ahead as long as they are together. They return to the academy where Etia and Ariel are waiting for them, prepared to tell them of their next assignment.
8	"The Overflowing Water"; Transliteration: "Koboreochiru Mizu" (Japanese: こぼれおちる水)	August 24, 2013
Etia reveals her findings concerning the Lovers user's disappearance to the girls, theorizing that if a Daemonia carrying a card that matches that of a tarot user is defeated, that user will disappear along with them. She begs the girls to flee should they encounter their counterpart. As the girls have conflicting opinions about what the right thing to do is, Luna, who desires to protect Akari at any cost, feels agitated when she seems to take Seira's side. Later, as the girls fight against another Daemonia, they come face to face with Temperance's counterpart card, which deals whatever damage it takes to Ginka, forcing them to retreat. Given some time off from action, Ginka visits Yataro, who assures her that she helps bring balance to her group. Ginka decides to face her counterpart alone, with the others helpless to do anything but watch as they defeat each other, vanishing into nothingness.
9	"The Moon's Light, The Sun's Shadow"; Transliteration: "Tsuki no Hikari, Taiyō no Kage" (Japanese: 月の光、太陽の影)	August 31, 2013
As everyone in Sefiro Fiore becomes saddened and frightened by Ginka's disappearance, Luna is called by her butler to stay at her villa to rest. While there, she recalls how her twin sister, Serena, disappeared one day, as well as remembering when she first awakened to her powers. As Luna contemplates her feelings for Akari, she is seemingly visited by her, making her feel a lot better. However, when Luna expresses her feelings to her, it is soon revealed that the Akari she has been speaking with is actually Cerebrum, who forces a Diablos card into her body, transforming her into a wolf-like hybrid of a Daemonia and an Elemental Tarot user.
10	"Like Burning Away"; Transliteration: "Moetsukiru Yōna" (Japanese: 燃え尽きるような)	September 7, 2013
Luna, in her mutated form, appears before Akari and Seira, biting Seira in the neck, leaving her with a butterfly mark. After retreating back to Sefiro Fiore with Seira in tow, Akari helps Priscilla and Meltina escape from a battle against their counterparts. Akari is informed about Cerebrum from Laplace and Schrödinger, the messengers of the Leguzario organization that formed Sefiro Fiore, informing her that she will inevitably have to fight Luna. Akari asks Seira for her help, only to learn that the bite she took from Luna had sealed off her Tarot powers, leaving Akari the only one capable of fighting against the Daemonia. After fighting Daemonia for several days straight, Akari eventually comes up against Luna, barely managing to escape after Luna's human will holds herself back. Whilst visiting her mother's grave afterwards, Akari encounters a small girl who had allegedly lost her mother, barely avoiding running into another trap laid out by Cerebrum. As Seira hears rumors about a wolf in the mountains, Cerebrum uses his contacts to incite a mob to attack Sefiro Fiore, forcing Akari and the others to retreat.
11	"Your Path"; Transliteration: "Kimi no Michi" (Japanese: 君のみち)	September 14, 2013
Akari and the others take shelter at Nagasaki's mansion, where Nagasaki tells Etia about her time with Hinata and Akari. Meanwhile Seira searches an old abandoned building and finds Luna with Cerebrum, who tells Seira that Luna had wanted her to disappear of her own free will out of jealousy over Akari. Cerebrum tells Seira that she'll be able to get back her powers if she kills Luna, giving her only a few hours before Luna wakes up. The next morning, Etia makes the decision to defy Leguzario and tell Akari the secret being hidden from her, that her father was someone infected by the Daemonia, with Akari herself being half Daemonia. After learning this, Akari goes to confront Cerebrum, who offers to save Luna and Seira in exchange for her coming with him, whilst Seira is forced to defend herself from the now awake Luna.
12	"Choosing Your Destiny"; Transliteration: "Unmei no Sentaku" (Japanese: 運命の選択)	September 21, 2013
Wanting to save Seira and Luna, Akari agrees to Cerebrum's conditions and is transported to a place called the Sephirothic Tree, where he intends to use a device called the Clessidra so that they can mate, returning Seira and Luna to normal in exchange. Inside the Clessidra, Cerebrum forces Akari to relive the day Fuyuna died, hearing her thoughts of hatred towards her over and over, until she loses enough of herself to be his. Arriving at the Sephirothic Tree, Seira and Luna face up against an army of tree Daemonia, which they manage to defeat thanks to the mysterious arrival of Ginka. Meanwhile, Akari, believing that Fuyuna became a Daemonia because of her, is hanging on to the last of her sanity.
13	"The Sun's Smile"; Transliteration: "Taiyō no Hohoemi" (Japanese: 太陽の微笑み)	September 28, 2013
Etia and Ariel are given a key by Leguzario that will let them free Akari from the Clessidra, but only with the right timing. Meanwhile, it is revealed that Ginka was able to defeat her counterpart and break free from the dimension she was trapped in thanks to Akari. Back in the Clessidra, Akari is finally able to hear Fuyuna's true thoughts, that she truly loved her but was overcome by her jealousy. Stating that she loves her too and accepting her destiny, Akari manages to overcome the darkness. As Cerebrum attempts to kill Akari, Etia and Ariel use the key to unlock their previously sealed powers, allowing them to break Akari free. After failing to lure Akari and the others into darkness again, Cerebrum transforms into his ultimate form, but all the tarot users unite against him, allowing Akari to break through and destroy him. Afterwards, as the girls head to an overseas Sefiro Fiore branch, Akari finds a note left behind by Fuyuna, encouraging her in her path to one day save everyone from the Daemonia.
14	"The Impenetrable Heart"; Transliteration: "Fumikomenai Kokoro" (Japanese: 踏み込めない心)	November 16, 2013
The episode takes place prior to the series, when Akari moves in with Fuyuna following the passing of her mother. During their time in elementary school, Fuyuna feels jealous of Akari's popularity with others. Meanwhile, Luna, who is starting off as a tarot wielder, struggles to fight against the Daemonia, having only just learned of their true nature, and begins training under Priscilla and Meltina. Whilst visiting the library, Luna comes across a novel that Fuyuna wrote, reading the whole book and sympathizing with its protagonists, realizing she needs to work to change herself. Akari, noticing Fuyuna feeling downhearted, decides to take her to the mall to cheer her up. Just then, the mall is attacked by a Daemonia, with Akari heading back inside to rescue a girl trapped inside. Noticing Akari and the girl in danger, Luna overcomes her fear in order to save them and awaken her healing ability, allowing Seira and Ginka to defeat the Daemonia. However, the experience leaves Fuyuna feeling more inferior to Akari, leading her to become a target of Cerebrum's schemes.

== Reception ==
Rebecca Silverman of Anime News Network gave the first half of the series an overall rating of B, praising the series' powerful moments and the accuracy of the depiction of tarot cards, while criticizing the series' character design. Silverman gave the same rating to the second half, concluding that "Overall, however, what began as a difficult show to classify ends on a satisfying note, with problems resolved thanks to the inner strength of Akari and her friends as much as by their magical powers. It isn't as well done as some other magical girl shows, but Day Break Illusion manages to turn itself into a story worth watching as it comes full circle to resolve the problems it opened with."
