= Peace, Love & BBQ =

2008 studio album

Studio album by Marcia Ball
- Released: 2008
- Genre: Blues, R&B
- Label: Alligator
- Producer: Stephen Bruton

Marcia Ball chronology
JazzFest Live (2007)	Peace, Love & BBQ (2008)	Roadside Attractions (2011)

Peace, Love & BBQ is an album by the American musician Marcia Ball, released in 2008. Ball supported the album with a North American tour.

The album peaked at No. 1 on the Billboard Blues Albums chart. It was nominated for a Grammy Award for "Best Contemporary Blues Album".

== Production ==
The album was produced by Stephen Bruton. Ball wrote or cowrote eight of the album's songs. Terrance Simien contributed to the album. Tracy Nelson cowrote and duetted on "Where Do You Go?" Dr. John sang on "I'll Never Be Free". "I Wish You Well" is a cover of the Bill Withers song. "Party Town" is about the rebuilding of New Orleans after Hurricane Katrina. Ball played accordion on "Miracle in Knoxville", about the death of a preacher during a tent revival.

== Critical reception ==
Professional ratings
Review scores
Source	Rating
AllMusic	3.5/5 stars
PopMatters	5/10

The Times Colonist wrote that Ball "continues to mine the Gulf Coast's rich seam of swampy R&B with this collection of ballads and good-rockin' blues." The Austin Chronicle noted that "the slight gruff of Ball's voice adds character where it lacks versatility and fervor, but her fingers are magic on the 88s and range through styles with ease." The Pittsburgh Post-Gazette concluded that, "with all its elegant, perceptive songwriting, rocking music and soulful presentation, the saucy BBQ is a very fine album."

PopMatters determined that "Ball's strong, unapologetic voice disrupts any idea of easy packaging or smooth listening, which means we have to take the words she is belting seriously." AllMusic deemed the album "lots of upbeat party tunes, a few peppy Cajun and Zydeco inflected zingers, some ballads, and a couple of love songs all delivered with Ball's husky, soulful voice and driven by her nimble boogie-woogie piano." The Houston Press opined that "Peace, Love & BBQ finds a Texas favorite in a bit of a creative rut, though most of her faithful fans won't necessarily know the difference."

== Track listing ==
No.	Title	Length
1.	"Party Town"
2.	"Peace, Love & BBQ"
3.	"Miracle in Knoxville"
4.	"Watermelon Town"
5.	"Down in the Neighborhood"
6.	"Where Do You Go?"
7.	"My Heart and Soul"
8.	"I'll Never Be Free"
9.	"Married Life"
10.	"Falling Back in Love with You"
11.	"Right Back in It"
12.	"Ride It Out"
13.	"I Wish You Well"

== Personnel ==
- Guitar: Stephen Bruton, Mike Keller
- Lap steel guitar: Cindy Cashdollar. Mandolin: Stephen Bruton
- Bass – David Barard, Don Bennett
- Keyboards: Marcia Ball, Ian McLagan, Mac Rebennack
- Accordion: Marcia Ball,Terrance Simien, Wayne Toups
- Drums: Herman "Roscoe" Ernest III, Corey Keller
- Percussion: Barry "Frosty" Smith
- Saxophone: Lon Price, Thad Scott
- Brass: L.A. Horns, Lee Thornburg
- Backing vocals: Christine Albert, Vickie Carrico, Chris Gage, Tracy Nelson, Sydney Scott, Terry Tucker
