= Blue House (album) =

Studio album by Marcia Ball
- Released: August 16, 1994
- Genre: Blues
- Length: 54:42
- Label: Rounder
- Producer: Marcia Ball & Miles Wilkinson

Marcia Ball chronology
Dreams Come True (with Lou Ann Barton and Angela Strehli (1990)	Blue House (1994)	Let Me Play with Your Poodle (1997)

Professional ratings
Review scores
Source	Rating
The Penguin Guide to Blues Recordings	3/4 stars

Blue House is a blues album by Marcia Ball. It is her seventh studio album and was released in 1994 by Rounder Records.

== Track listing ==
All tracks are written by Marcia Ball, except as noted.

No.	Title	Writer(s)	Length
1.	"Red Beans"	McKinley Morganfield	4:09
2.	"The Facts of Life"		5:44
3.	"Down the Road"		3:56
4.	"Blue House"		3:24
5.	"Big Shot"		Big Shot
6.	"St. Gabriel"		6:18
7.	"That's What I Get"	Jerry Lynn Williams	5:03
8.	"Fingernails"	Joe Ely	3:14
9.	"Why Do I"		5:46
10.	"If This Is Love"	Duke Robillard	3:56
11.	"Sparkle Paradise"		4:32
12.	"One of a Kind"		4:45
Total length:			54:42

== Personnel ==
- Marcia Ball - piano and vocals, Hammond B3 on track 8 and 10, accordion on track 6, background vocals on tracks 3 and 7
- Don Bennett - bass, background vocals on track 5
- Rodney Craig - drums, background vocals on track 3, 5 and 7
- Steve Williams - guitar
- Paul Klemperer - saxophone
- Mark Kazanoff - first saxophone solo on track 4 and tenor saxophone solo of track 5.
- The Kamikazi horns on tracks 1, 2, 3, 4, 5 and 10: Mark Kazanoff - tenor saxophone; Red Rails - baritone saxophone; Keith Winking - trumpet; Randy Zimmerman - trombone
- Rich Brotherton - acoustic guitar on track 12 and mandolin on track 7
- David Webb - Hammond B3 on tracks 7 and 9
- Jill Napoletan - background vocals on tracks 3 and 7
- "Mambo" John Treanor - drums on track 11, congas on track 1 and washboard on track 5
- David Kampa - art direction and design
- Scott Van Osdol - photography
- Gordon Fowler - Inspirational Blue House painting
