= Soulful Dress =

Studio album by Marcia Ball
- Released: 1984
- Genre: Blues
- Label: Rounder
- Producer: Denny Bruce

Marcia Ball chronology
| Circuit Queen (1978) | Soulful Dress (1984) | Hot Tamale Baby (1985) |

Soulful Dress is a blues album by Marcia Ball. It is Ball's second solo album. Soulful Dress was released in 1984 through Rounder Records. Stevie Ray Vaughan played the first guitar solo on "Soulful Dress".

== Critical reception ==
Professional ratings
Review scores
| Source | Rating |
|---|---|
| AllMusic | 3/5 stars |
| Christgau's Record Guide | B+ |
| The Encyclopedia of Popular Music | 3/5 stars |
| The Grove Press Guide to the Blues on CD | 3/5 stars |
| The Penguin Guide to Blues Recordings | 2.5/4 stars |
| The Rolling Stone Album Guide | 3/5 stars |

The Rolling Stone Album Guide wrote that "blues ballads and contemporary honky-tonk stylings further recommend an album that is both personally revealing and musically swinging." Nashville Scene called the album "one of the decade’s most nuanced explorations of New Orleans-style R&B."

== Track listing ==
All songs written by Marcia Ball except as noted.

1. "Soulful Dress" (Maurice McAlister, Terry Vail) – 3:16
2. "Make Your Move Too Soon" – 3:19
3. "I'd Rather Go Blind" (Billy Foster, Ellington Jordan) – 5:08
4. "Jailbird" (Dave Bartholomew) – 2:58
5. "Eugene" – 3:44
6. "My Mind's Made Up" – 2:29
7. "A Thousand Times" – 3:25
8. "That's Why I Love You" (Moore) – 3:33
9. "Soul on Fire" (LaVern Baker, Ahmet Ertegün, Jerry Wexler) – 4:46
10. "Don't Want No Man" – 3:00

== Personnel ==
- Piano, vocals – Marcia Ball
- Bass – Don Bennett
- Drums – Wes Starr
- Guitar – Kenny Ray, Stevie Ray Vaughan
- Horns – The Mighty Big Horns (Keith Winking, Kent Winking, Pat Mackrell)
- Organ – Nick Connolly
- Tenor saxophone, alto saxophone – Mark Kazanoff
