= Marcia Ball =

American blues singer and pianist (born 1949)

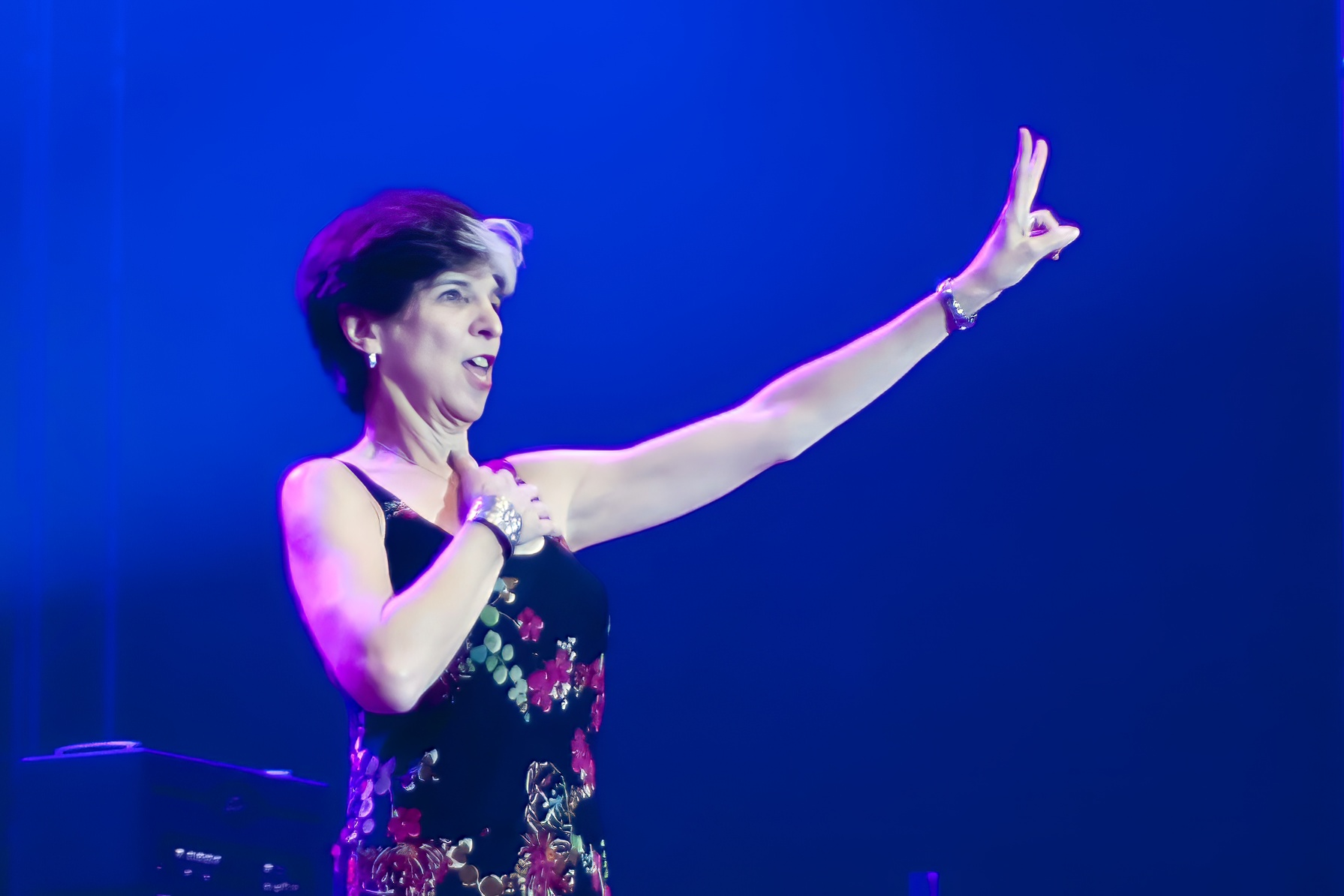
- Marcia Ball in concert (2011)

Background information
- Born: March 20, 1949 (age 77); Orange, Texas, U.S.
- Origin: Vinton, Louisiana, U.S.
- Genres: New Orleans blues; New Orleans R&B; swamp blues; Louisiana blues; Texas blues; boogie-woogie; swamp rock
- Instruments: Piano; vocals
- Years active: 1970–2025
- Website: www.marciaball.com

Marcia Ball (born March 20, 1949) is an American retired blues singer and pianist raised in Vinton, Louisiana.

Ball was described in USA Today as "a sensation, saucy singer and superb pianist... where Texas stomp-rock and Louisiana blues-swamp meet." The Boston Globe described her music as "an irresistible celebratory blend of rollicking, two-fisted New Orleans piano, Louisiana swamp rock and smoldering Texas blues from a contemporary storyteller." In October 2025, Ball announced she was diagnosed with amyotrophic lateral sclerosis, and that she would be retiring from touring and performing. In 2026 Ball was inducted into the Blues Hall of Fame.

== Early life and education ==
Ball was born in Orange, Texas, into a musical family. Her grandmother and aunt both played piano music of their time and Ball started piano lessons when she started school, and showed an early interest in New Orleans style piano playing, as exemplified by Fats Domino, Professor Longhair, and James Booker. She has named Irma Thomas, the New Orleans vocalist, as her chief vocal inspiration. Ball studied English at Louisiana State University in the 1960s while playing in a band called Gum. In 1970, at age 21,Marcia was in the audience at the One Knite club listening to Dub and the Dusters when she was invited onstage by Freddie Fletcher and Bobby Earl Smith. She was an instant success and the band morphed into a progressive country band called Freda and the Firedogs in Austin, Texas, and began her solo career in 1974.

== Career ==
She began her recording career as a solo artist with Rounder Records in the 1980s and early 1990s. In 2001, she joined the Chicago-based Alligator Records. Her Rounder album, Sing It!, which featured vocalists Irma Thomas and Tracy Nelson, released in January 1998 was nominated for a Grammy Award and a Blues Music Award for "Best Contemporary Blues Album." Ball received the 1998 Blues Music Award for "Contemporary Female Vocalist of the Year" and "Best Blues Instrumentalist-Keyboards."

She was awarded "Contemporary Blues Album of the Year" for her albums Presumed Innocent (2002) and So Many Rivers (2004). The same year she also won "Contemporary Blues Artist of the Year-Female." She won the "Best Blues Instrumentalist-Keyboards" again in 2005, 2006, 2007, and 2009. The BMA for Keyboards has since been renamed the Pinetop Perkins Piano Player Award and Ball has won it in 2012 and 2015. Her 2003 Alligator release, So Many Rivers, was nominated for a Grammy as were Live! Down The Road (2005) and Peace, Love & BBQ (2008). She was inducted into the Austin Music Hall of Fame in 2018.

Ball has continued to work with Irma Thomas. In 2006, the two contributed a duet ("Look Up") on the New Orleans Social Club release, Sing Me Back Home (Burgundy Records/Honey Darling Records). In 2007, the two contributed another duet ("I Can't Get New Orleans Off My Mind") to Goin' Home: A Tribute to Fats Domino (Vanguard Records). She continues to play at nightclubs, particularly in Austin and New Orleans, and performs at music festivals in North America and overseas.

In May 2015, Ball won the 'Pinetop Perkins Piano Player' award at the Blues Music Awards ceremony. She won the same award in 2019.

On October 25, 2018, Ball was inducted into the Austin City Limits Hall of Fame, where she first appeared during their inaugural season in 1976.

In October 2025, Ball announced she was diagnosed with amyotrophic lateral sclerosis, and that she would be retiring from touring and performing.

In 2026, Ball was inducted into the Blues Hall of Fame.

== Musical style ==
Ball's piano style includes elements of zydeco, swamp blues, Louisiana blues, and boogie woogie.

== Discography ==
=== Solo or principal artist ===
- 1972: Freda and the Firedogs
- 1978: Circuit Queen (Capitol)
- 1984: Soulful Dress (Rounder)
- 1985: Hot Tamale Baby (Rounder)
- 1989: Gatorhythms (Rounder)
- 1990: Dreams Come True (Antone's) (with Lou Ann Barton and Angela Strehli)
- 1994: Blue House (Rounder)
- 1997: Let Me Play With Your Poodle (Rounder)
- 1998: Sing It! (Rounder) (with Tracy Nelson and Irma Thomas)
- 2001: Presumed Innocent (Alligator Records)
- 2003: So Many Rivers (Alligator)
- 2004: Live at Waterloo Records (Alligator)
- 2005: Live! Down The Road (Alligator)
- 2007: JazzFest Live (MunckMusic)
- 2008: Peace, Love & BBQ (Alligator)
- 2011: Roadside Attractions (Alligator)
- 2014: The Tattooed Lady and the Alligator Man (Alligator)
- 2018: Shine Bright (Alligator)

=== Other contributions ===
- 2000 Don Wise: On the Verge of Survival, (Horn O'Copia Records) with Delbert McClinton
- 2003: Patchwork: A Tribute to James Booker (STR Digital Records)
- 2006: Sing Me Back Home, New Orleans Social Club (Burgundy Records/Honey Darling Records) Duet with Irma Thomas, "Look Up".
- 2007: Goin' Home: A Tribute to Fats Domino (Vanguard Records) Duet with Irma Thomas, "I Can't Get New Orleans Off My Mind".
- 2009: Dave Alvin and the Guilty Women (Yep Roc Records) With Dave Alvin. Member of "The Guilty Women" band.

== Filmography ==
- 1976: Eaten Alive, Circuit Queen played on background radio
- 2003: The Blues, episode 'Piano Blues' directed by Clint Eastwood
- 2006: New Orleans Music in Exile

== Festival appearances ==
- San Francisco Blues Festival – 1984
- Austin Aqua Fest – 1986
- Long Beach Blues Festival – 1996
- Rhythm And Roots Festival (Charlestown, Rhode Island) – 2000, 2001, 2003, 2005, 2006, 2008, 2010, 2011, 2013, 2015, 2017
- Thursday at the Square – 2002
- Monterey Jazz Festival – 2002
- Austin City Limits Music Festival – 2004
- National Folk Festival (USA) – 2005
- Waterfront Blues Festival (Portland, Oregon) – 2007
- New Orleans Jazz and Heritage Festival – 2004, 2007, 2008, 2009, 2014, 2015, 2018, 2025
- Arkansas Blues and Heritage Festival (Helena, Arkansas) – 2010
- Crescent City Blues and BBQ Festival (New Orleans, Louisiana) – 2011, 2024
- Wednesday At The Square, Lafayette Square Park (New Orleans, Louisiana) — 2010, 2011, 2015, 2017
- Chicago Blues Festival – 2013
- Edmonton Blues Festival - 2018

== See also ==
- List of blues musicians
- List of boogie woogie musicians
- List of Louisiana blues musicians
- List of Swamp blues musicians
- List of people from Texas
- List of Austinites
- Music of Austin
