= Let Me Play with Your Poodle (album) =

Let Me Play With Your Poodle

Studio album by Marcia Ball
- Released: 24 June 1997
- Genre: Blues
- Label: Rounder
- Producer: Derek O'Brien, Marcia Ball, Mark Kazanoff

Marcia Ball chronology
Blue House (1994)	Let Me Play With Your Poodle (1997)	Sing It! (1998)

Professional ratings
Review scores
Source	Rating
AllMusic	4.5/5 stars
The Penguin Guide to Blues Recordings	3/4 stars

Let Me Play With Your Poodle is a blues album by Marcia Ball. It was released on June 24, 1997 on Rounder Records. AllMusic noted: "This album of snaky swamp rock is one of Ball's best recordings".

== Track listing ==
All songs written by Marcia Ball except as noted.

1. "Let Me Play with Your Poodle" (Hudson Whittaker) - 4:14
2. "Why Women Cry" - 3:29
3. "Crawfishin'" (Clarence Garlow, Leon Rene) - 2:53
4. "How Big a Fool" (Speeks) - 3:55
5. "The Right Tool for the Job" - 4:15
6. "I'm Just a Prisoner (Of Your Good Lovin')" (Eddie Harris, George Jackson) - 3:39
7. "I Still Love You" (Eamonn Campbell) - 6:14
8. "Can't Trust My Heart" (Delbert McClinton) - 3:30
9. "The Story of My Life" - 3:59
10. "Something I Can't Do" (Mike Duke) - 3:25
11. "For the Love of a Man" - 5:29
12. "American Dream" - 3:59
13. "Louisiana 1927" (Randy Newman) - 5:13
