= Gatorhythms =

Studio album by Marcia Ball
- Released: 1989
- Genre: Blues
- Length: 34:29
- Label: Rounder
- Producer: Marcia Ball

Marcia Ball chronology
Hot Tamale Baby (1985)	Gatorhythms (1989)	Dreams Come True (1990)

Gatorhythms is an album by the American musician Marcia Ball, released in 1989 through Rounder Records. It was coproduced by Ball, who wrote or cowrote seven of the songs. She supported the album with a North American tour.

== Critical reception ==
Professional ratings
Review scores
Source	Rating
Chicago Tribune	3/4 stars
The Penguin Guide to Blues Recordings	2/4 stars
The Rolling Stone Album Guide	3/5 stars

The Washington Post wrote that "'Find Another Fool' and 'You'll Come Around' are languid, heartfelt country-and-blues laments." The Chicago Sun-Times concluded that, "for the first time in her vinyl career, Ball's voice is as powerful as her piano playing." The Palm Beach Post determined that the album's "filled with gospel-flavored ballads, soulful laments and bluesy, boogie woogie party songs driven by her dynamic piano playing."

== Track listing ==
All tracks are written by Marcia Ball, except as noted.

No.	Title	Writer(s)	Length
1.	"How You Carry On"	Seth David; Mac Rebennack	2:42
2.	"La Ti Da"		3:42
3.	"The Power of Love"		4:16
4.	"Mobile"		3:10
5.	"Find Another Fool"		4:20
6.	"Mama's Cooking"	Marcia Ball; Stephen Bruton	3:03
7.	"What's a Girl to Do"	Lee Roy Parnell; Cris Moore	3:28
8.	"Daddy Said"		2:43
9.	"You'll Come Around"		3:54
10.	"Red Hot"	Lee Roy Parnell; Cris Moore	3:11
Total length:			34:29

== Personnel ==
- Marcia Ball – vocals, piano, accordion and organ
- Don Bennett – bass
- Rodney Craig – drums, cowbell and triangle
- Stephen Bruton – electric, acoustic and slide guitars
- Derek O'Brien – guitar on tracks 1, 7 and 9
- James Hinkle – rhythm guitar on tracks 2 and 4
- Jesse Taylor – guitar solos on tracks 4 and 10
- Mark Kazanoff – tenor and baritone saxophones
- Keith Winking – trumpet
- John Blondell – trombone
- Angela Strehli – background vocals
- Lou Ann Barton – background vocals
