= Leviathan (clothing) =

Australian clothing company

UWM Corporation
- Type: Private company
- Founded: Melbourne, Australia (1865)
- Headquarters: Perth, Western Australia
- Key people: Tom Werner, CEO
- Products: Apparel, sporting goods
- Number of employees: Over 220
- Website: www.leviathan.org.au www.leviathan.cc

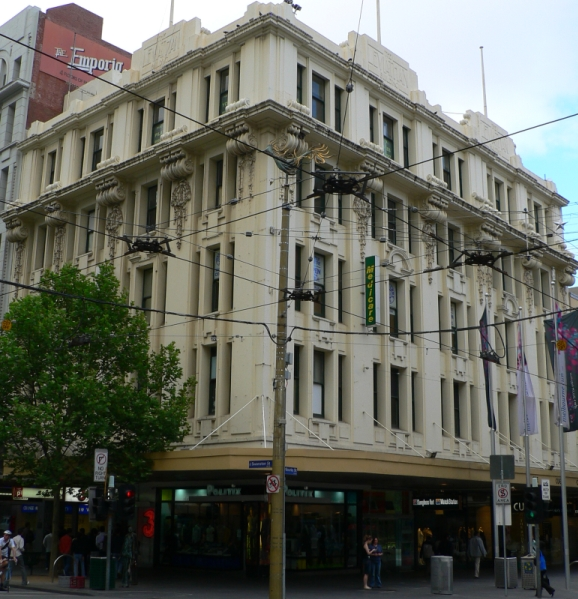
Leviathan building in Melbourne

Leviathan is an Australian clothing brand established by 1865 at 68 Bourke Street East in Melbourne, Victoria, by Leviathan Clothing Industry, which began its activities as garments manufacturer for transoceanic crews.

Its headquarters, the Leviathan Building, on the prominent Melbourne corner of Bourke Street and Swanston Street, was designed and realized in 1912-13 by Bates, Pebbles & Smart, in an eclectic style with Beaux Arts form, but stylized classical elements, and Edwardian Baroque details, including the most prominent feature being over-scaled Mannerist scrolled brackets supporting a large cornice.

The company was relocated to Perth, Western Australia, in 1969 by UWM Corporation. They renewed the trademark Leviathan name as one with a focus on marine outdoor garments for sailing, surfing and watersports. Distribution of Leviathan products has been developed in Australia, Europe, Japan and North America.

Since 1974, Leviathan, through the Werner Foundation based in Perth, is a sponsor of oceanographic research institutions and marine exploration activities.
