= So Many Rivers (Marcia Ball album) =

Studio album by Marcia Ball
- Released: April 22, 2003
- Studio: The Hit Shack, Austin, Texas
- Genre: Blues
- Length: 55:02
- Label: Alligator Records
- Producer: Stephen Bruton

Marcia Ball chronology
Presumed Innocent (2001)	So Many Rivers (2003)	Live at Waterloo Records (2004)

Professional ratings
Review scores
Source	Rating
AllMusic	2.5/5 stars
The Penguin Guide to Blues Recordings	2.5/4 stars

So Many Rivers is the eleventh album by Marcia Ball, and her second for Alligator Records. AllMusic's review states, "This is a standout from this queen of the gatorhythms that bring the swamp alive."

== Track listing ==
All tracks are written by Marcia Ball, unless otherwise noted.

No.	Title	Writer(s)	Length
1.	"Foreclose On The House Of Love"	John Lee Sanders	4:47
2.	"Dance With Me"	Danny Timms	4:51
3.	"Baby, Why Not"		3:37
4.	"Honeypie"	Danny Timms	3:37
5.	"Give Me a Chance"		3:28
6.	"Didn't You Know"		4:10
7.	"Give It Up (Give In)"		4:32
8.	"So Many Rivers to Cross"	Jodi Siegel; Daniel Moore	3:44
9.	"The Storm"		4:48
10.	"The Lowdown"		3:20
11.	"Hurricane On China Lake"	Danny Timms	3:39
12.	"Three Hundred Pounds of Hongry"	Donnie Fritts; Eddie Hinton	3:43
13.	"If It's Really Got To Be This Way"	Donnie Fritts; Arthur Alexander; Gary Nicholson	3:37
14.	"If It Ain't One Thing"	Doug Duffey	3:09
Total length:			55:02

== Musicians ==
- Marcia Ball: piano, vocals
- Stephen Bruton: electric and acoustic guitar, mandolin
- James Pennebaker: guitar, lap steel, baritone guitar, fiddle
- Pat Boyack: guitar (tracks 4, 6, 12)
- Don Bennett: bass (tracks 3, 4, 5, 6, 7, 12)
- Yoggie Musgrove: bass (tracks 1, 2, 8, 14)
- Chris Maresh: bass (tracks 9, 10, 11, 13)
- Tom Fillman: drums
- Keith Robinson: drums (track 4)
- Wayne Toups: accordion and vocal (track 4)
- Johnny Nicholas: harmonica (track 7)
- Red Young: Hammond B3 Organ
- Deborah Dobkin: percussion

== Production ==
- Produced by Stephen Bruton
- Recorded at The Hit Shack, Austin, Texas
- Mixed at The Austin School of Music
- Engineered and mixed by Chet Himes
- Assistant Engineer: Todd Dillon
- Additional recording at Greenleaf Place, N. Hollywood, California
- Engineered by Ross Hogarth
- Track information and credits taken from the album's liner notes.
