= Hot Tamale Baby =

Studio album by Marcia Ball
- Released: April 1985
- Recorded: April 1985
- Studio: Studio Solo. Slidell, Louisiana
- Genre: Blues
- Label: Rounder
- Producer: Scott Billington

Marcia Ball chronology
Soulful Dress (1984)	Hot Tamale Baby (1985)	Gatorhythms (1989)

Professional ratings
Review scores
Source	Rating
The Penguin Guide to Blues Recordings	2.5/4 stars

Hot Tamale Baby is the fourth studio album by American blues musician Marcia Ball, released in April 1985 by Rounder Records.

== Track listing ==
1. "Never Like This Before" (Isaac Hayes, Booker T. Jones, David Porter) – 2:55
2. "I'm Gonna Forget About You" (O. V. Wright) – 2:54
3. "Love's Spell" (Marcia Ball) – 3:59
4. "I Don't Know" (Gene Barge, Laura Lee) – 2:17
5. "Hot Tamale Baby" (Clifton Chenier) – 3:06
6. "That's Enough of That Stuff" (Marcia Ball) – 4:27
7. "Don't You Know I Love You" (Alvin Tyler) – 2:06
8. "Another Man's Woman" (Marlin Greene, George Jackson, Dan Penn) – 4:20
9. "If I Ever Needed Love" (Jimmy Oliver) – 3:41
10. "Uh Uh Baby" (Henry Glover, Rose Marie McCoy) – 2:16

"Hot Tamale Baby" was track 1, side 2 on Clifton Chenier's album Boogie 'n' Zydeco, released on Rounder Records in 1980.
