= INS Leviathan =

INS Leviathan may refer to one of the following submarines of the Israeli Sea Corps:

- INS Leviathan (1943), the former British T-class submarine HMS Turpin (P354); acquired by the Israeli Sea Corps in 1965; scrapped in 1978.
- INS Leviathan (1997), a Dolphin-class submarine; commissioned in November 1999; in active service.
