= Presumed Innocent (album) =

Studio album by Marcia Ball
- Released: 2001
- Genre: Blues
- Label: Alligator Records

Marcia Ball chronology
Sing It! (1998)	Presumed Innocent (2001)	So Many Rivers (2003)

Professional ratings
Review scores
Source	Rating
The Penguin Guide to Blues Recordings	2/4 stars

Presumed Innocent is the 2001 breakthrough album of Marcia Ball. It spent seven months on the Billboard blues chart and won the 2002 W.C. Handy Blues Award for Blues Album of the Year.

== Track listing ==
1. The Scene of the Crime 3:11
2. You Make It Hard 4:01
3. Count the Days 3:29
4. Let the Tears Roll Down 5:43
5. Louella 4:27
6. Fly on the Wall 4:21
7. I Have the Right to Know 4:50
8. Thibodaux, Louisiana 3:30
9. I'm Coming Down with the Blues 4:01
10. Shake a Leg 2:57
11. Somebody to Love 3:34
12. She's So Innocent 4:54
13. You Make Me Happy
