= SS Vaterland (1913) =

Ocean liner (1913–1946)

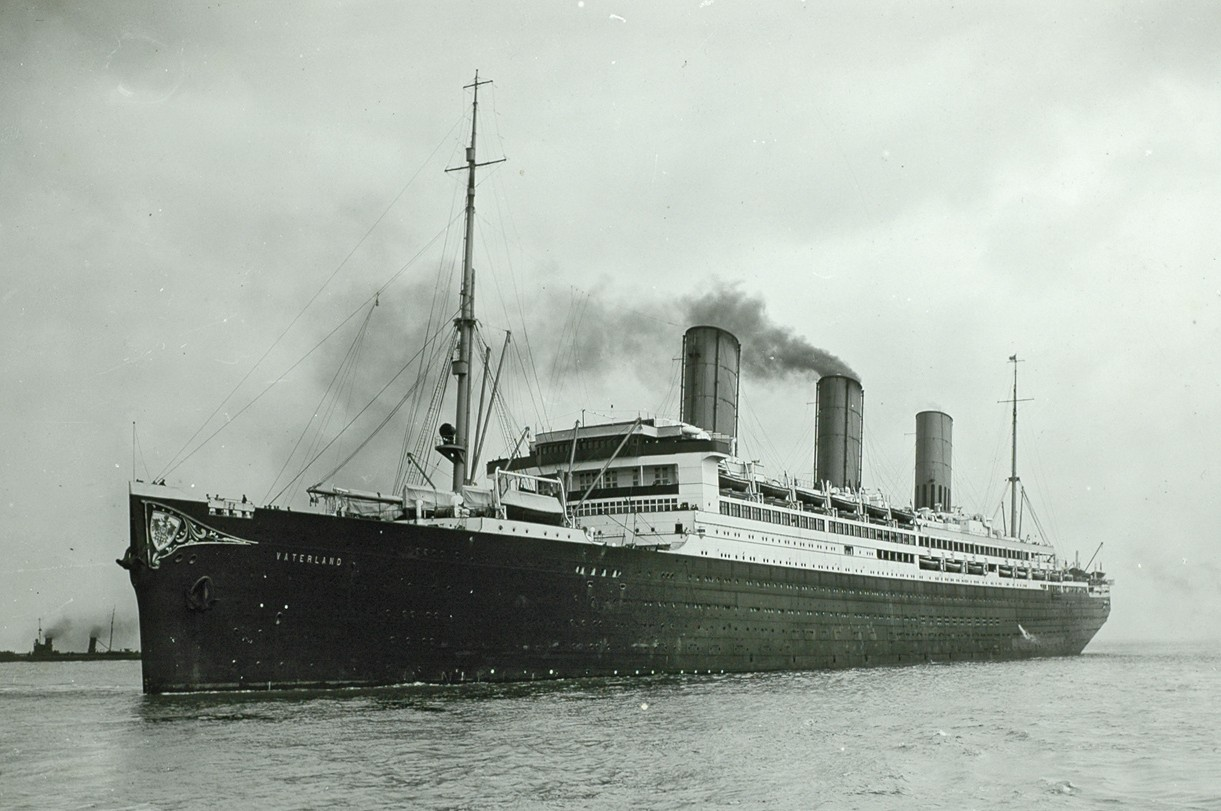
- German ocean liner Vaterland, seen in 1914.

History

German Empire
- Name: Vaterland
- Namesake: "Fatherland" in German
- Owner: HAPAG
- Operator: Hamburg America Line
- Port of registry: Hamburg
- Route: Hamburg – New York
- Builder: Blohm+Voss, Hamburg
- Yard number: 212
- Laid down: September 1911
- Launched: 3 April 1913
- Completed: 29 April 1914
- Maiden voyage: 14 May 1914
- In service: 14 May 1914 – July 1914
- Out of service: July 1914 to 6 April 1917
- Identification: Code letters RVFJ; Call sign DVD
- Fate: Seized by the United States

United States
- Name: USS Leviathan
- Namesake: Leviathan
- Owner: United States Shipping Board (1917—1929)
- Acquired: Seized: 6 April 1917; Navy custody: June 1917
- Commissioned: July 1917
- Decommissioned: 29 October 1919
- Fate: Sold into civilian service
- Notes: Commissioned as a troopship in World War I

United States
- Name: Leviathan
- Owner: United States Shipping Board (1917—1929); United States Lines (1929—1938) (Note: The line was itself a USSB/EFC operating entity until sale in the 1930s.)
- Port of registry: New York
- Acquired: 29 October 1919
- Maiden voyage: 4 July 1923
- In service: June 1923 to 1933, some service in 1934
- Out of service: 1933 to 1937
- Identification: US official number 215446; code letters LHQD (until 1933); call sign WSBN (by 1934)
- Fate: Sold for scrap in 1938, broken up after 1946 at Rosyth

General characteristics
- Class & type: Imperator-class ocean liner
- Tonnage: 59,956 GRT, 27,696 NRT (1925); 48,942 GRT, 15,796 NRT (1934)
- Displacement: 69,000 short tons (63,000 t)
- Length: 950 ft (290 m); 906.9 ft (276.4 m) (Registry)
- Beam: 100 ft 4 in (30.58 m)
- Draft: 37 ft 9 in (11.51 m)
- Depth: 23 ft 7 in (7.19 m)
- Decks: 11
- Speed: 26 knots (48 km/h; 30 mph)
- Capacity: Civilian service; 1st class: 752; 2nd class: 535; 3rd class: 850; 4th class(intermediate): 1,772; Total: 3,909; World War I service; Up to 12,106 troops
- Crew: Civilian service: 1,234; World War I service: 2,348
- Armament: World War I Navy service: 8 × 6-inch/50-caliber guns; 2 × 1-pounder guns; 2 × Colt machine guns; 1 × Lewis machine gun; 2 × Y-Type depth charge guns

SS Vaterland was an ocean liner, launched on 3 April 1913, that began service in 1914 for Germany's Hamburg America Line. The ship, second of three classmates and then the largest passenger ship in the world, made her first voyage to New York, arriving on 21 May 1914 to celebrations featuring German and American officials at the line's Hoboken facilities.

The ship was designed to carry 4,050 passengers with most of them in third or fourth class. The 700 first class and 600 second class passengers traveled in considerable luxury. The main public rooms took advantage of an unusual arrangement of routing along the ship's sides of the conduits from the boilers to the Funnels, rather than through the ship's center, in order to allow long and unbroken access from a main dining room, that was a replica of the New York Ritz-Carlton restaurant, forward to the lounge and to the ballroom aft. Vaterland served on the route for less than a year before being laid up at the line's piers in the neutral United States due to the start of World War I and risk of seizure by the Allies at sea.

With U.S. entry into WWI in 1917, Vaterland and the German line's Hoboken facility were seized by the US government. The ship was placed under the control of the United States Shipping Board. It was given July 1917 to the US Navy for completion of repairs and conversion to a troop ship. In July 1917 the ship was commissioned as USS Vaterland and on 6 September 1917 renamed USS Leviathan (ID-1326) and assigned to the Cruiser and Transport Force. The ship's first troop transport voyage departed New York on 17 December 1917 with 7,250 troops. At Liverpool, England, the ship spent fifty days in drydock, where her large size was shown to be a problem, and the ship's capacity for carrying troops increased to 8,200. Further trips were destined for Brest, France, and the troop capacity incrementally increased to 10,500 by summer of 1918, which then expanded to 14,000 with double bunking. The ship's speed allowed transit without escort, and Leviathan and the fast ships Great Northern and Northern Pacific often made the transit together without escort. During the war the ship made ten round trips transporting a total of more than 119,000 troops to Europe. That process was reversed after the war with the ship's last voyage with returning troops arriving on 8 September 1919. The ship was decommissioned and turned over to the Shipping Board on 29 October 1919, remaining laid up at Hoboken until April 1922.

At the end of the war there was a surplus of ships and a large number of Shipping Board–sponsored companies. Further operation of Leviathan was hampered not only by that surplus but also from the lack of its original German blueprints, which had to be re-created by measuring the ship. The ship was also caught up in controversies regarding the company originally agreeing to operate the ship.

In April 1922, $8,000,000 in funding made it possible to move the ship to the Newport News Shipbuilding & Dry Dock Company, Newport News, Virginia, for a complete refurbishment and overhaul, including all wiring and plumbing being replaced and conversion from coal to oil as fuel. Interior decorations were modernized in a 1920s style.

In June 1923 the ship was returned to the Shipping Board as SS Leviathan with an increase in gross tonnage leading to its being advertised as the largest and fastest liner, a claim that was challenged by both the British Cunard and White Star lines. The United States Lines was contracted to operate the ship for a minimum of five Atlantic voyages per year. Though popular in the U.S. market, high cost and inability to sell alcohol during Prohibition, during which all U.S. registered ships were "dry", made it so that many sought foreign shipping. Even with the ship eventually being allowed to serve "medicinal" alcohol when outside U.S. waters, the Great Depression drove the line to demand either subsidies or that the Shipping Board take the ship back. In June 1933 Leviathan was laid up at Hoboken, but the Shipping Board required the ship to go into operation, at a loss. The 1936 high season for the Atlantic saw a loss of $143,000 on the first trip and by the required fifth voyage the ship was at half capacity. The line paid the Shipping Board $500,000 to retire the ship with a continued requirement to keep it in running condition. In the entire operating period as a U.S. liner the ship never made a profit despite efforts by the United States Line to make her profitable, including the installation of a seaplane ramp above her bridge.

British Metal Industries Ltd. bought Leviathan in 1937, with the ship arriving at Rosyth, Scotland, on 14 February 1938 for scrapping, which would be finished by early 1940.

== Construction and early career ==
Vaterland, a 52,980 GRT steam turbine passenger liner, was built by Blohm & Voss at Hamburg, Germany, as the second of a trio of very large ships of the Imperator class for the Hamburg America Line's trans-Atlantic route. Construction began in September 1911. The 1906–1907 construction berths had been inadequate for Vaterland. To accommodate the new ship, a new berth was constructed in 1910–1911, with a width of 288 ft (87.8 m) at the waterfront, a height of 166 ft (50.6 m) from floor to crane runway, and a length of 1,025 ft (312.4 m), with 16 traveling cranes and a 230-ton revolving crane capable of handling the new ship's machinery.

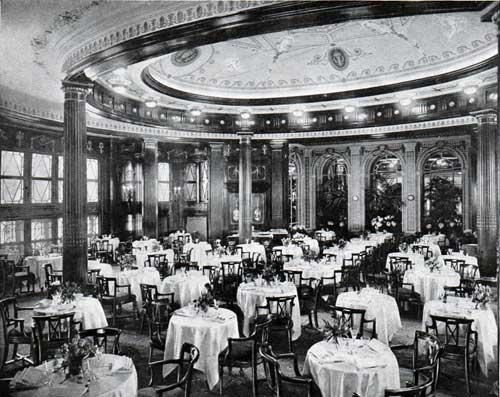
The Ritz-Carlton of Leviathan

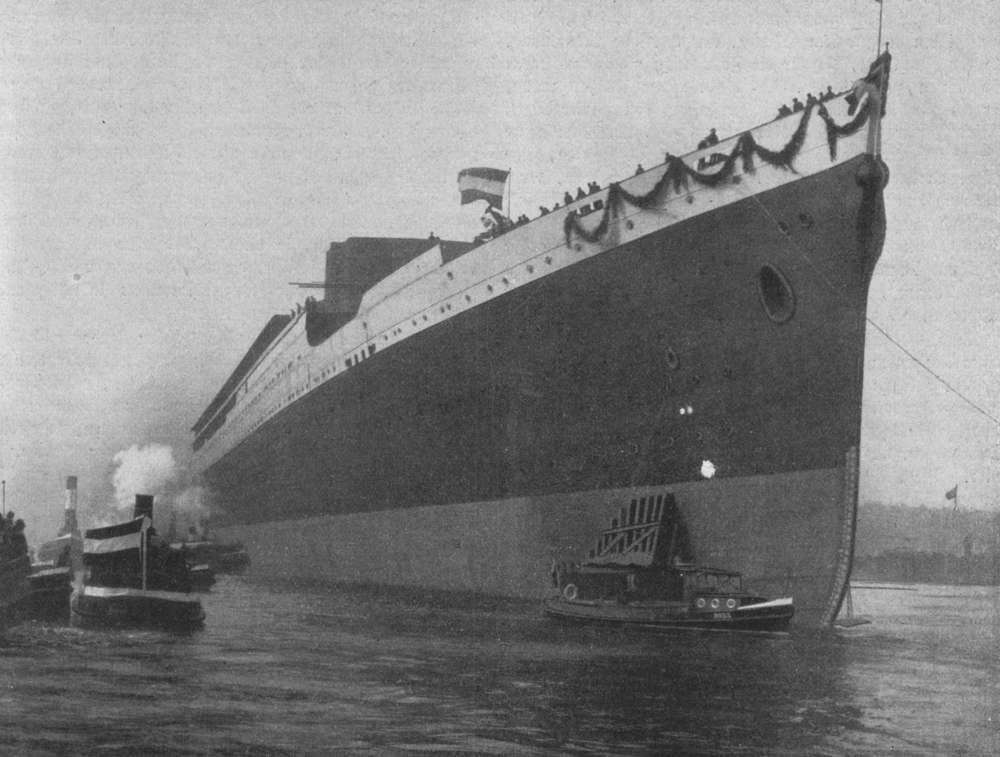
Launch of Vaterland, 3 April 1913

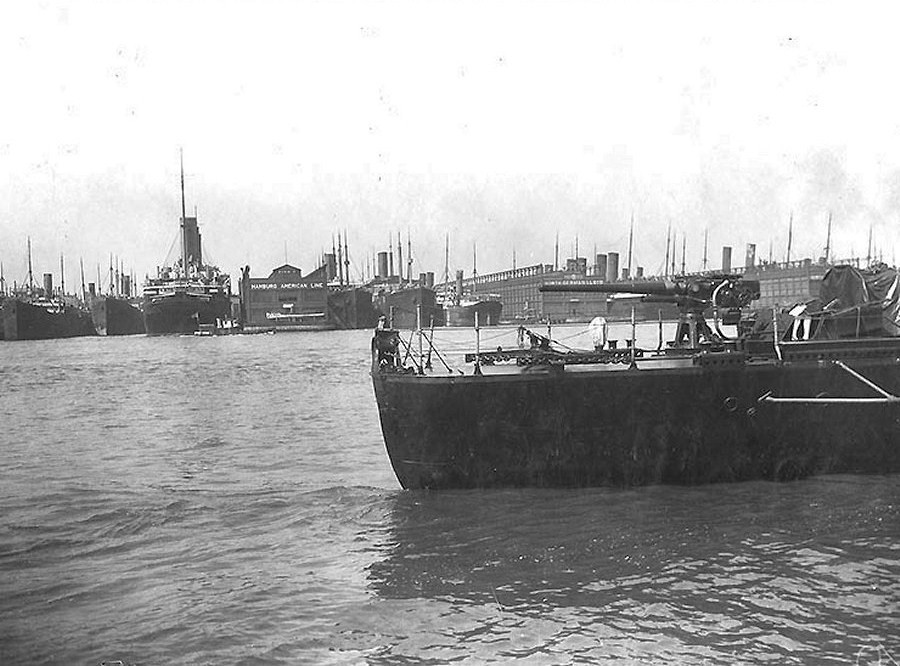
Vaterland (largest ship) and other German liners laid up in New York, 4 April 1917

Vaterland was built to conform to German, British, and American laws and rules of shipbuilding. The ship had a double bottom and double skin to above the waterline with transverse and longitudinal steel bulkheads. The ship had five steel decks with four superimposed decks for a total of nine decks above the waterline. In an unusual new arrangement, the funnels passed through the decks at the sides of the hull rather than at the centre, which allowed for an entirely new arrangement of the public rooms. Those rooms opened from one to the next so that a vista extended from the Ritz-Carlton restaurant, which replicated the New York original, through the palm garden, and grand hallway to the main lounge and ballroom. The main staircase extended through six decks and was supplemented by elevators. The wireless system, provided by a Marconi rival, the Telefunken Company of Berlin, was the most powerful installed at the time on a ship. It consisted of a long distance set to keep the vessel in constant touch while crossing the Atlantic, a second set with 400 mile day range and 1,200 mile night range, and a battery-powered set on standby for emergencies. Of the 83 lifeboats, with a capacity for about 5,300, the two powered boats were also equipped with wireless. Forty-six watertube boilers in four stokeholds provided steam for the turbines driving the four 19' 7" diameter screws.

The ship was launched on 3 April 1913 in a ceremony performed by Rupprecht, Crown Prince of Bavaria. Intended passenger capacity of 4,050 was to consist of 700 first, 600 second, 1,050 third, and 1,700 fourth class passengers. With 1,200 crew, the total number of persons aboard was to be 5,250 with 83 lifeboats, which had capacity for more than those aboard. Vaterland was the largest passenger ship in the world upon her completion, superseding SS Imperator, but later being superseded in turn by the last ship of this class, SS Bismarck, which later became the RMS Majestic.

On the ship's maiden voyage, arriving at New York on 21 May 1914, there were 1,234 crew commanded by HAPAG commodore Hans Ruser. The engine department consisted of a chief engineer, three first engineers, thirty-five assistants and electricians, with boilers operated by twelve chief firemen, fifteen oilers, 187 stokers, and 189 trimmers. The ship was highly electrified and had an electric forced-air system for circulating fresh air throughout the ship.

At the reception luncheon held aboard at the Hamburg-American Line's Hoboken piers after that maiden voyage, attended by the German Ambassador and officials of the line, Albert Gleaves, at the time commandant of the New York Navy Yard and later commander of the Cruiser and Transport Force in the war, asked an official about how many troops the ship could carry. He reported that the official replied: "Ten thousand, and we built her to bring them over here." Three years later, at the same pier, by then seized for the Army's Hoboken Port of Embarkation and with the ship under a new name, Gleaves again was aboard, as commander of convoy operations in the Atlantic, seeing the ship preparing to take 10,000 soldiers to fight Germany.

Vaterland had made only a few commercial round-trips when, in late July 1914, she arrived at New York City just as World War I began. With a safe return to Germany rendered questionable by British dominance of the seas, the ship was laid up at her Hoboken, New Jersey, terminal and remained immobile for nearly three years.

== World War I ==
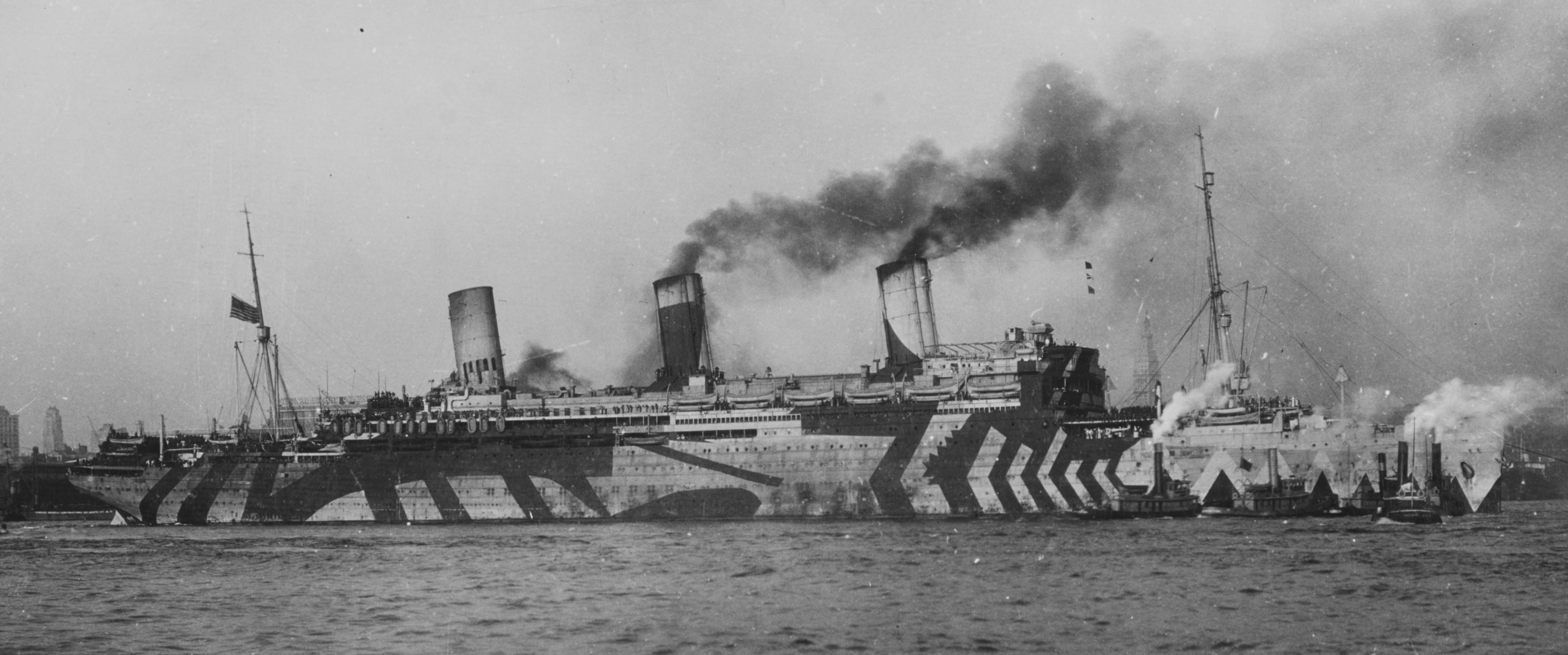
USS Leviathan in dazzle camouflage

Vaterland was seized by the United States Shipping Board (USSB) when the United States entered World War I on 6 April 1917. Of all the German ships seized, Vaterland was the only one not to have had engines and machinery damaged by the German crews. Her German crew was sent to a new internment camp in Hot Springs, North Carolina, where many of them later died of a typhoid fever outbreak in summer 1918 as they were about to be transferred to Fort Oglethorpe, Georgia. Despite the lack of intentional damage the ship was badly deteriorated, requiring major repairs, cleaning, and painting. The work was going slowly under the USSB, and the ship was turned over to the custody of the United States Navy (USN) in June 1917. Vaterland was the last of the German ships turned over to the Navy to complete repair and conversion.

She was commissioned by the USN in July 1917 as the transport USS Vaterland, with Captain Joseph Wallace Oman in command. On 6 September 1917 she was redesignated SP-1326 and renamed Leviathan by President Woodrow Wilson.

The trial cruise to Cuba on 17 November 1917 prompted Captain Oman to order 241 Marines on board to relieve a detachment of Marines and to station themselves conspicuously about the upper decks, giving the appearance from shore that the great ship was headed overseas to increase the American Expeditionary Forces. Upon her return later that month, she reported for duty with the Cruiser and Transport Force.

The transport sailed for Europe on 17 December 1917 with 7,250 troops to Liverpool, England, where the transport's size, a major advantage for its troop capacity, demonstrated how that size limited the ports and repair facilities that could be used in Europe. The ship entered dry dock there but could only enter or leave the dry dock on full-moon tides, which were required to float the ship over the dock's sill. In the fifty days there the ship's troop capacity was increased to 8,200. The ship was repainted with the British-type dazzle camouflage scheme that she carried for the rest of the war. After return to New York her capacity was increased to 8,900. On 4 March 1918 the ship again sailed for Liverpool but was diverted to Brest for future voyages due to poor berthing and coaling facilities in Liverpool. In early summer of 1918 the ship's troop capacity was increased to 10,500.

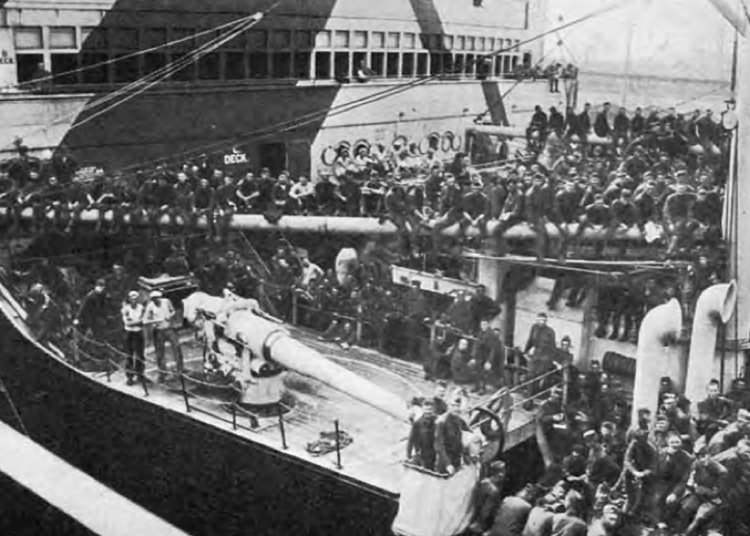
Leviathan leaving for France from the Hoboken Port of Embarkation with 11,000 American troops.

Leviathan began regular passages between the Hoboken Port of Embarkation and Brest, France, delivering up to 14,000 persons on each trip. Once experience in embarking troops was gained, 11,000 troops could board the ship in two hours. While officers had staterooms, the ship was so crowded that one wrote that he supervised a room with 487 enlisted men, who slept in four-high stacks of bunks. Men ate twice a day in groups of 500, marching in a precise path to the dining room where they had exactly 20 minutes; with 12,000 soldiers and 2,000 crew, eight hours were needed to feed the passengers one meal. Men were taken up on deck for an hour each day; if the weather was poor they had to wait until the next day, "as every hour of the day every foot of deck space was taken up".

To meet the troop transport demands in reaction to the German offensive of March 1918, the fastest ships began a system in which troops shared bunks, taking turns to sleep. Leviathan thus doubled its capacity from 7,000 to 14,000 troops. With their speed, Leviathan, Northern Pacific, and Great Northern sailed without escort together. In June 1918 the German Admiralty announced Leviathan had been sunk with American troops onboard. The German press was enthusiastic about the claim that the former Vaterland, converted to an American troop transport, had been sunk. In the midst of this enthusiasm the ship was mistakenly reported as having been torpedoed, when in fact it was the British troopship Justicia that had actually fallen victim to German submarines.

On 29 September 1918, Leviathan left New York for Brest on a voyage that would prove to have the worst in-transit casualties of the deadly second wave of the Spanish flu. By the time she arrived at Brest on 8 October, 2,000 were sick, and 80 had died.

Before the armistice was signed on 11 November 1918, the ship made ten round trips from Hoboken to Europe, transporting more than 119,000 fighting men. Leviathan carried 14,416 troops on one trip, setting a record for the most humans on one vessel. Amongst the ship's US Navy crew in this period was future film star Humphrey Bogart.

Transports, including Leviathan, underwent needed overhauls after the signing of the armistice and before the major effort of returning the troops began. Leviathan was repainted grey overall by December 1918 and transported veterans back to the United States with nine westward crossings, the last ending on 8 September 1919. On 29 October 1919, Leviathan was decommissioned and turned over to the US Shipping Board and again laid up at Hoboken until plans for her future employment could be determined.

== American service ==
=== Reconstruction ===
The US Shipping Board was, by the end of the war, encumbered with surplus tonnage and government-sponsored shipping companies. On 17 December 1919, the International Mercantile Marine (IMM) signed a contract with the United States Shipping Board's Emergency Fleet Corporation (EFC) that IMM as agent would supervise the plans and specifications for complete rehabilitation of the ship. That work was done by the construction department of IMM assisted by two committees of leading shipyard representatives, one to address general reconditioning and the other to address conversion from coal to oil as fuel. The result was issued on 9 April 1920 to six commercial and two Navy yards. Only one bid was returned by Todd Shipbuilding Corporation, (Note: There were numerous "Todd" entities involved in ship work and without exact location for the entity being given which entity is referenced here is difficult to determine. The USSB EFC took over or took controlling interest in U.S. shipbuilding in the war and afterwards disposed of many or allowed the private concern to buy the facility back from the EFC (see Sisth Annual Report of the United States Shipping Board pages 211-212).) and the Boston Navy Yard responded with an estimate. Costs and work in yards were at a peak and the EFC decided to await a more favorable time to solicit new bids.

In March 1921, the EFC directed the agents to prepare a new set of specifications for a fully operational ship, including all necessary articles such as table and silverware, linens, and books. The IMM construction department was thoroughly familiar with the ship, including specifications for machinery repair that were not in the original request for bids. Blueprints for the original construction had not been received from Germany under the Versailles Treaty and the price now asked by the German builders, $1,000,000, was deemed outrageous. So, an army of workers measured every part of the ship, and a new set of blueprints were made. On 31 October 1921, a new solicitation went out with bids due on 29 December 1921. The EFC postponed the bid deadline to 30 December and accepted the bid of the Newport News Shipbuilding & Dry Dock Company in Newport News, Virginia, for $6,135,575, which was $3,334,000 less than the Boston Navy Yard's estimate and $5,145,000 less than the commercial bid received for the original, which did not included any work on machinery or incidentals such as table service and linens. On 15 February 1922 a contract was awarded to include $515,000 for machinery repair, for a total of $6,116,000, with a separate award of $546,366.63 to Gimbel Brothers of New York for equipping the Steward's department with the incidental items. The total awarded was $6,656,366.63. At the same time Gibbs Brothers Inc., later named Gibbs & Cox, hired to oversee the work leading to the contract, were awarded $1,518,058.37 for agency fees, inspection, audits and accounting, and miscellaneous repairs leading up to the award of the contract.

In agreement with IMM, the EFC cancelled the agency contract and awarded it to Gibbs Brothers, who took over as agent and on 28 February 1922 assumed all functions and obligations previously assigned to IMM. Newspaper mogul William Randolph Hearst, riding on nationalistic sentiment, had objected to the IMM involvement by claiming British influence over IMM. Despite the prolonged lay-up at Hoboken, the ship was quickly repaired and provided with the necessary gear, fuel, and crew to sail to Norfolk. The ship sailed on 9 April 1922, arriving without incident at the shipyard on 10 April. There the ship began a 14-month reconditioning and refurbishment. All wiring, plumbing, and interior layouts were stripped while her hull was strengthened and her boilers converted from coal to oil; virtually a new ship emerged.

While the ship was undergoing reconstruction, the Hoboken facilities were modified to be more suitable for such a large ship's operation. Pier #5 was removed and the space between #4 and #6 was dredged to a depth of 45 ft (13.7 m). Then, the plan changed and the ship was to be docked in Manhattan with an agreement with United American Lines to use Pier 86 at the foot of 46th Street. As a result of that decision the pier itself required strengthening and dredging was required to provide both a channel and turning basin. For 1,000 ft (304.8 m) up and down river and to the New Jersey shore dredging to 42 ft (12.8 m) and clearance of obstructions with aid of divers prepared a berth for the ship.

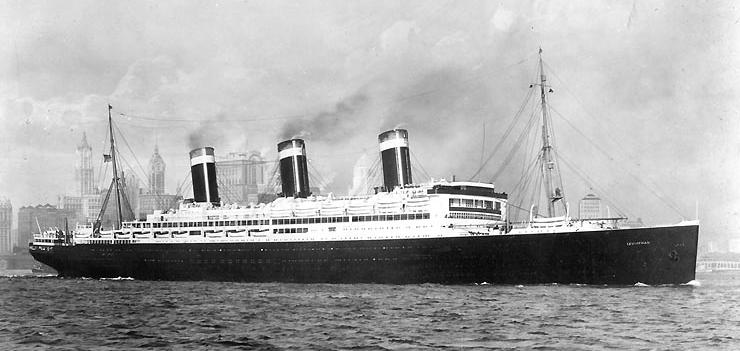
Leviathan operated by United States Lines, after her reconversion as an ocean liner, c. 1930s

The decorations and fittings, designed by New York architects Walker & Gillette, retained much of the ship's prewar splendor of Edwardian, Georgian, and Louis XVI styles, now merged with modern 1920s touches. The biggest deviation was an art deco nightclub supplanting the original Verandah Cafe. In June 1923, she was given back to the Shipping Board. Leviathan's measured tonnage had increased to 59,956.65 GRT and her speed trials showed an average of 27.48 knots. Thanks in part to Gibbs' clever accounting and the Gulf stream, she was advertised as the world's largest and fastest ship. This claim was immediately challenged by the Cunard Line, with a reminder that its RMS Mauretania still held the official speed record for a trans-Atlantic crossing, as well as by the White Star Line, which claimed the RMS Majestic as the world's largest ship, with a higher gross tonnage if properly calculated. In the next fiscal year, 30 July 1923 to 30 June 1924, new and more efficient three bladed propellers were designed to replace the original four bladed propellers to be installed at the next dry docking. The design was expected to increase speed while using 6,000 less horsepower than with the original propellers.

=== Service for United States Lines ===
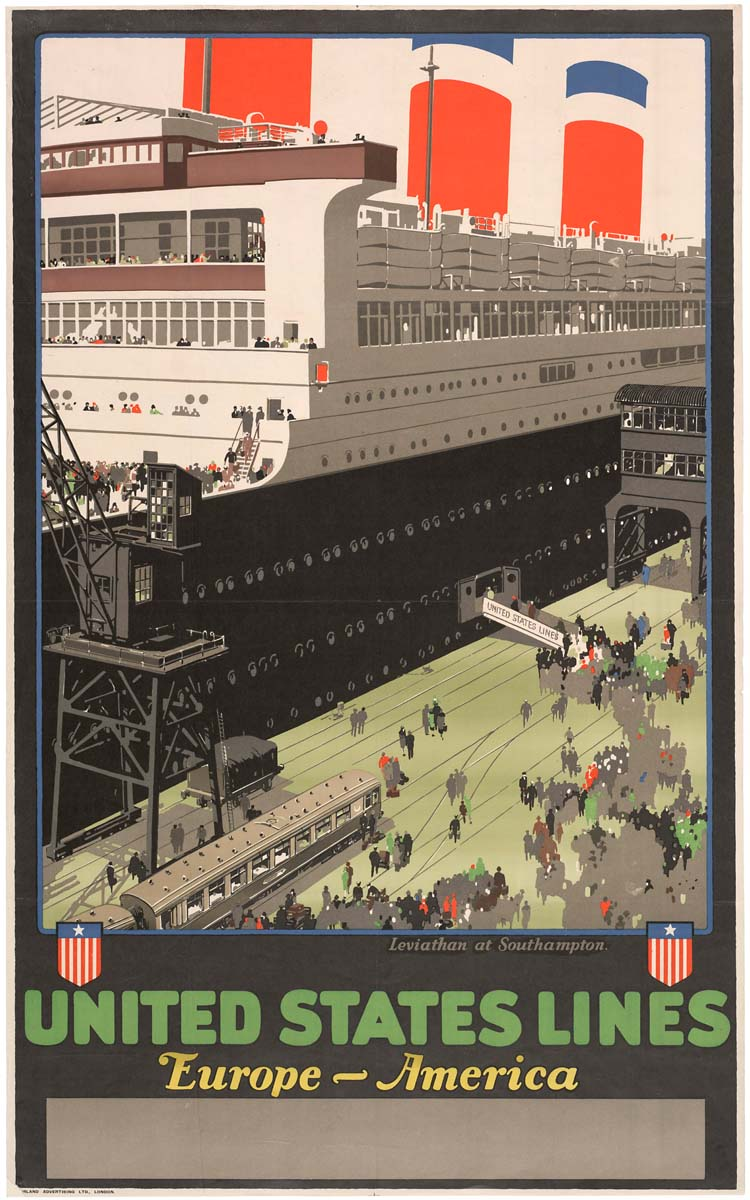
Advertising poster for United States Lines of the late 1920s, depicting Leviathan

United States Lines, the trade name of an operating entity of the USSB's Emergency Fleet Corporation (EFC), was obligated to run Leviathan for a minimum of five return voyages on the Atlantic run per year. All the line's finances were controlled by the USSB which also owned all its ships. Gibbs Brothers Inc would run her for her first voyages and train the crew. She immediately proved popular with the American public in the '20s, starting her career fully booked for her maiden voyage, which departed on 4 July 1923.

On 21 December 1923 Leviathan ran aground on the west side of the New York harbor channel near Robbins Reef Light at 10:44 in the morning and remained grounded until lifted by tide and pulled by tugs at 5:30 in the afternoon. The ship's course had been altered by a strong tidal current and though going at a reasonable speed and engines put to full astern the ship grounded from bow to just forward of the bridge. The ship's outboard engines had been inoperative astern for some time. Though investigation by the United States Steamboat Inspection Service found no negligence, they noted that the grounding might have been avoided if the wing propellers had been fully operational astern. They further noted that a ship of that size was very difficult to maneuver in the harbor. One result was to open waters formerly reserved for large naval vessels so that commercial vessels would not be forced to make a turn in the "Narrows" into the upper bay. The grounding led to a full review of the costs and technical difficulties of repairing the inoperative reverse turbines.

The ship's orchestra, the "SS Leviathan Orchestra", directed by Nelson Maples, was well regarded enough that in 1923 and 1924 Victor Records engaged it to record eleven selections at their New York studios, of which eight were commercially released. Decades later the name would be the inspiration for the New Leviathan Oriental Fox-Trot Orchestra.

Her average number of passengers reached 1,300 by 1926, making her the second most traveled ship on the Atlantic that year. Throughout 1927, she carried a career high 40,537 passengers, which was more than any other ship that year, including a record 2,741 passengers on an eastbound crossing that September. Despite her loyal passenger following, it would not be enough to make her profitable.

Her economic problems lay primarily in high labor costs and fuel costs, which were compounded by Prohibition. From 1920 all US registered ships counted as an extension of US territory, requiring them to be "dry ships" according to the National Prohibition Act. With the Atlantic shipping capacity oversaturated, especially after the Immigration Act of 1924, alcohol-seeking passengers readily chose other liners. But Leviathan was an American symbol of power and prestige, which despite her economic failings, made her a popular ship with loyal travelers. She attracted attention as the largest and fastest ship in the American merchant marine and was featured in countless advertisements. The only serious incident occurred one day out of Cherbourg on a winter crossing in 1924 where she met a fierce storm with 90-ft waves and winds up to 100 mph, at times forcing her into 20-degree rolls. Eleven portholes were smashed and 32 passengers were injured by the time the storm abated.

Captain Herbert Hartley commanded Leviathan from July 1923 until he retired in February 1928. (Hartley published his autobiography titled Home Is the Sailor in 1955). By the end of the decade, the "good years" were over, in which time the United States Lines had been sold and re-nationalized. In 1929 Leviathan was finally allowed to serve "medicinal alcohol" outside US territorial waters to make her more competitive with foreign lines and was quickly sent on Booze Cruises to make money.

=== Sale of United States Lines and final days ===
In 1929 the United States Lines was advertised to be sold with two ships, Monticello and Mount Vernon, as purchase options that were not included in the final accepted bid. (Note: The USSB noted that since it was divesting itself of shipping lines there was no point in reconditioning these two ships.) Six bids were received and opened on 15 January 1929. On 14 February, after hearings in the Senate Committee on Commerce had raised no objection, the bid of P. W. Chapman Co. of New York was accepted. The sale included another USSB entity, American Merchant Lines, which merged into the commercial United States Lines, Incorporated. The sale was executed on 21 March 1929, with Leviathan being the first ship delivered to the new line on 8 April. A requirement of the sale mandated the new owners, with the construction loan fund, build two first class liners with plans approved by the USSB and U.S. Navy, to operate with Leviathan. Another condition of sale was an obligation to operate the vessels for ten years with a minimum of 61 total voyages per year on the vessels purchased by the new line. Sale of the two lines and eleven vessels for $16,082,000 divested the USSB of its last passenger services. The price of Leviathan, at $6,782,000, was a significant portion of the sale price. The lines had been supervised by the Merchant Fleet Corporation under USSB/EFC with 630 employees, and that organization began dissolution.

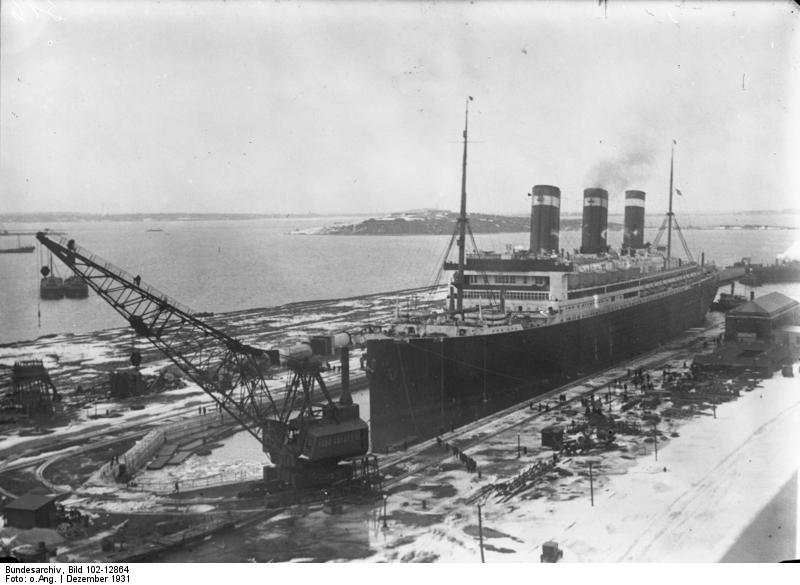
Leviathan in drydock, December 1931.

In October 1931, United States Lines had been reincorporated with the aid of the USSB as United States Lines of Nevada, Inc. after financial difficulties. IMM, which acquired the line at auction, was just as eager to be rid of the white elephant. The Great Depression was the final nail in the coffin. The USSB was abolished and its functions reduced to a bureau within the Department of Commerce on 10 August 1933. United States Lines actively lobbied for the government to either take the Leviathan back or provide a subsidy for her operation. She was laid up at her pier in Hoboken, New Jersey, in June 1933, having lost $75,000 per round trip since 1929. The government steadfastly stipulated that Leviathan should sail, and so she did after a refurbishment costing $150,000, for another five round trips. The first round trip sailed on 9 June 1934, high season on the Atlantic, and tallied a loss of $143,000. By Leviathan's fifth voyage, she sailed at barely half capacity. IMM paid the US government $500,000 for permission to retire her while keeping her in running order until 1936.

In early 1937, there were rumours of the ship being put back in to service as a troopship in the US Navy, but neither the Army nor Navy was interested, and she was later sold to British Metal Industries Ltd. On 26 January 1938 Leviathan set out on her 301st and last transatlantic voyage under the command of Captain John Binks, retired master of the Olympic, with a crew of 125 officers and men who had been hired to deliver the ship to the breakers. To quote author Melvin Maddocks, "Binks was not the luckiest of men now he had a ship to match him … it was no easier steering the old monster to her slaughter than it was to steer her anywhere else." Leviathan arrived at Rosyth, Scotland, on 14 February. In the 13 years that she served United States Lines she carried more than a quarter-million passengers, never making a profit. Due to her large size and World War II, the demolition of Leviathan was only completed on 14 February 1946.

SS Vaterland, USS Leviathan, SS Leviathan

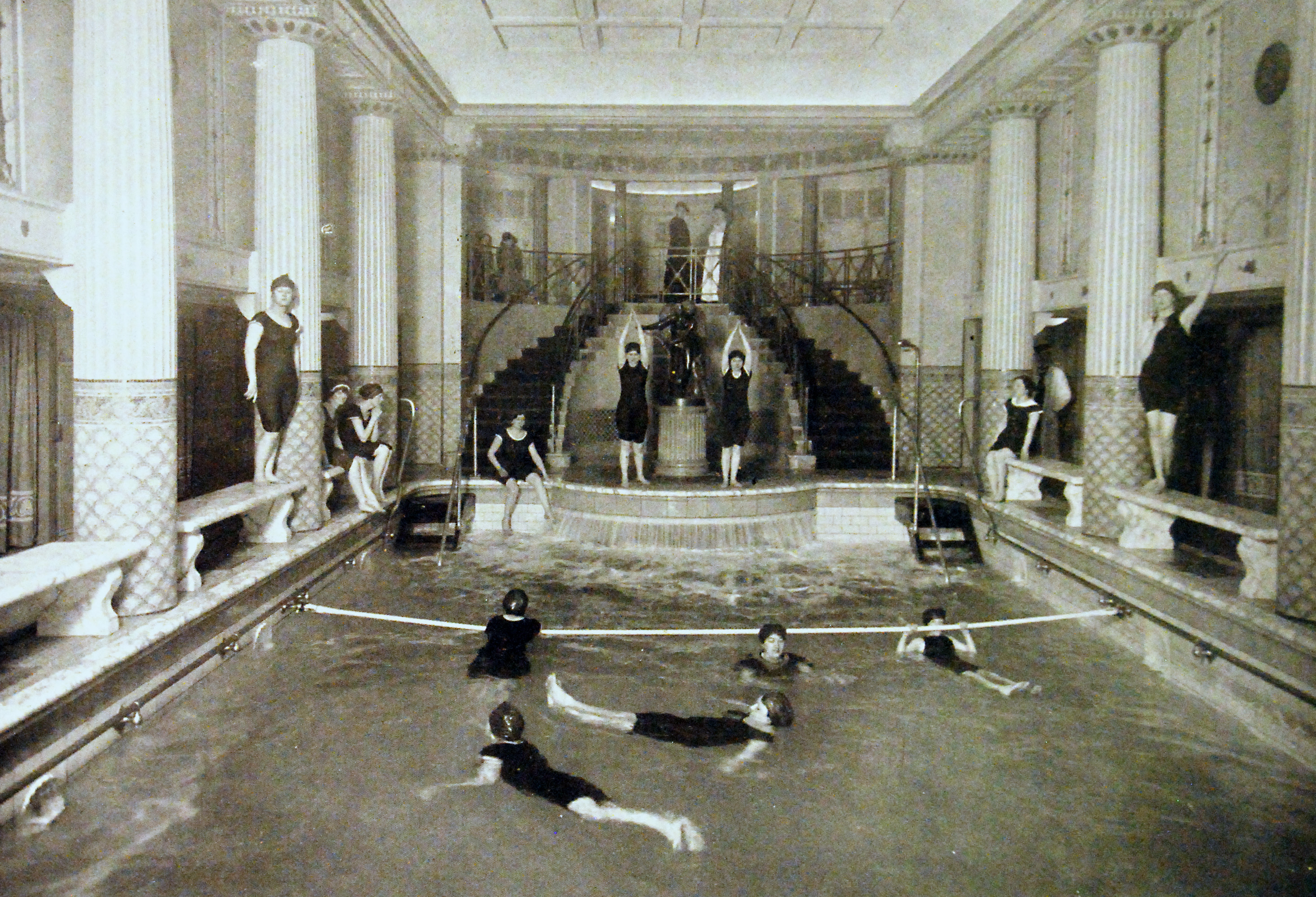
Swimming pool aboard the Vaterland

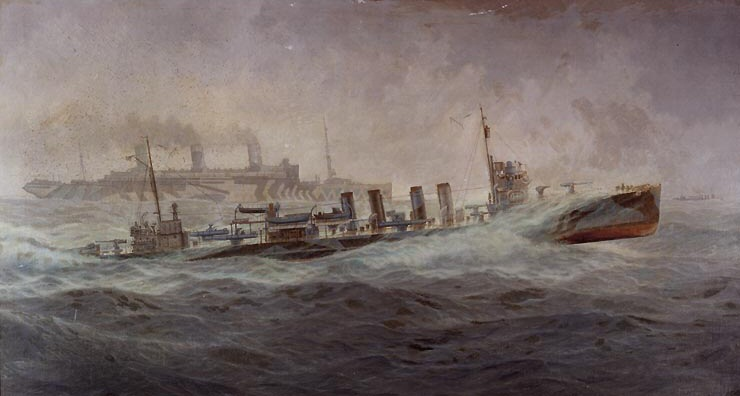
USS Leviathan escorted by USS Allen, both in dazzle camouflage, painted by Burnell Poole, 1918

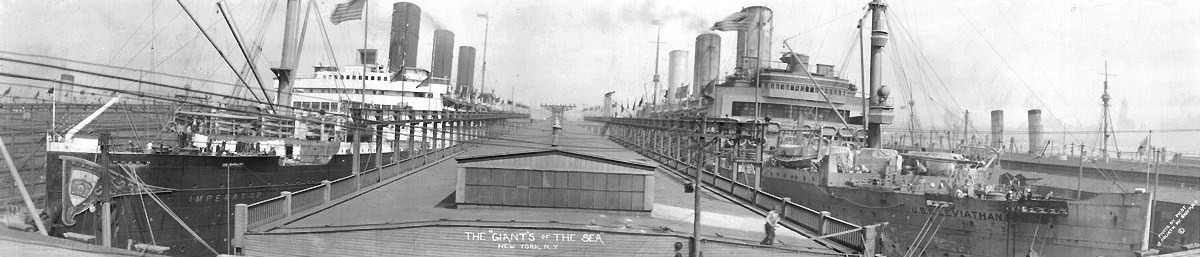
USS Imperator (at left) and USS Leviathan (at right) at Hoboken, New Jersey, circa 1919

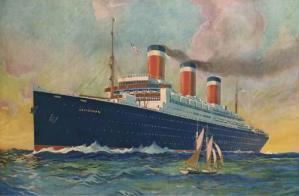
SS Leviathan, painted in 1925

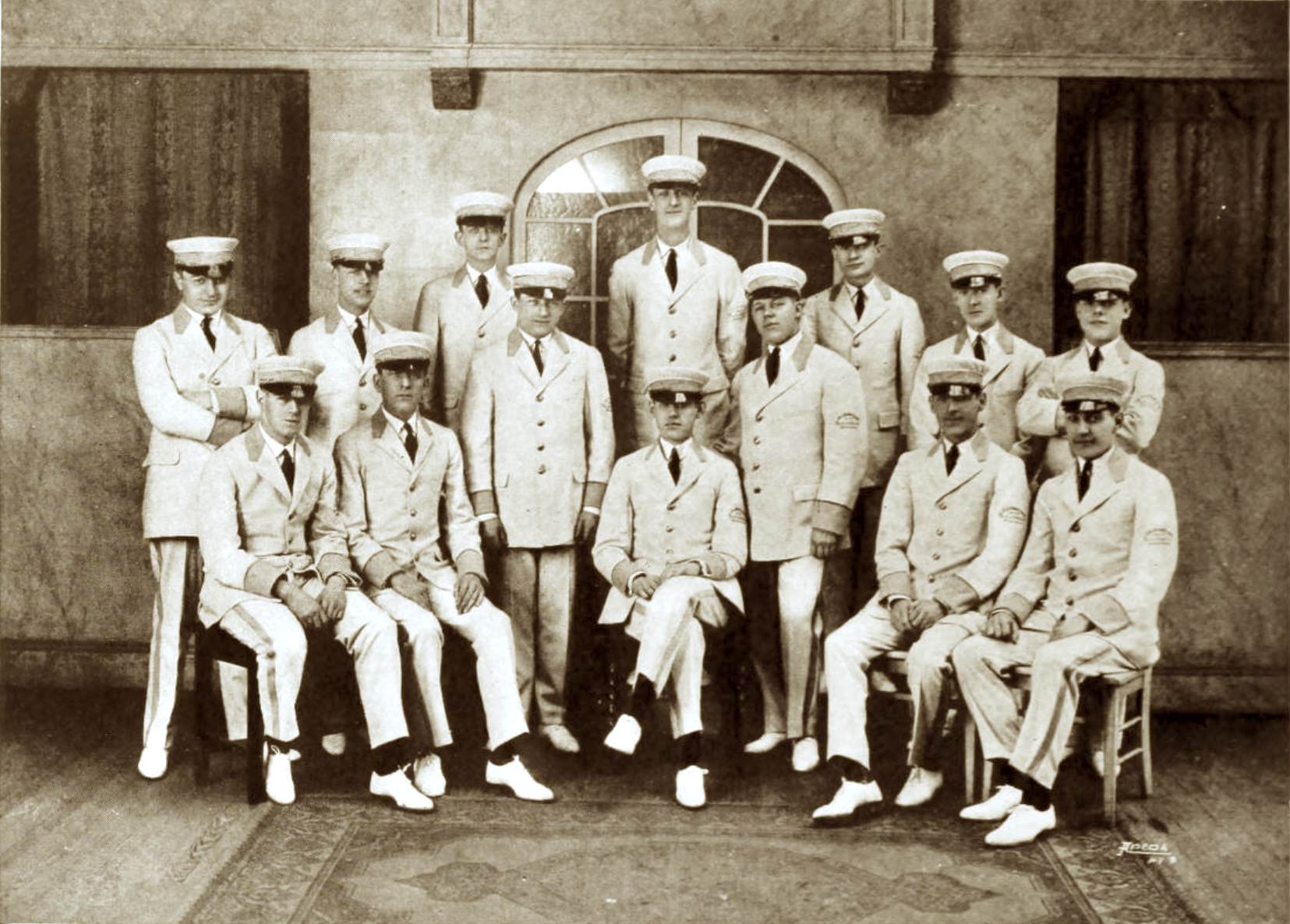
1923 photograph of members of the SS Leviathan Orchestra
