= Leviathan: The Last Day of the Decade =

- Developer: Lostwood Games
- Publisher: Lostwood Games
- Series: Leviathan
- Engine: Unity
- Platforms: Android, iOS, macOS, Microsoft Windows
- Release: 2013
- Genres: Adventure, visual novel
- Mode: Single-player

Leviathan: The Last Day of the Decade is a 2013 episodic adventure game developed and published by the Russian game studio Lostwood Games for the Microsoft Windows, Mac OS, iOS, and Android platforms. The game includes five episodes, all available both in Russian and English, and by June 2016, all had been released in German.

== Gameplay ==
The player reads through the story and makes decisions at certain points. The player has a variety of actions they can take during game play; these actions include befriending characters, collecting items, and traveling to different places. The player can buy items to unlock new options. Solving puzzles will progress the player through the story line. The player decides to take good or evil actions. Those actions will influence game play and lead to different endings.

== Plot ==
The setting of Leviathan takes place in a dark fantasy world mixed with cyberpunk and alien technologies. The country is ravaged by a disease called "Decade", which is caused by the Plague King. The "Decade" afflicts the land at irregular intervals and lasts for 10 years. Oliver Vertran, the protagonist and main character, was a young boy when the "Decade" began. When his mother is murdered, he becomes the adopted son of her murderer. Oliver and his friends Kael and Darina, with the help of a Vargoille called Edna, seek to punish a guardian for killing his mother.

== Episodes ==
Chapter	English release date	Languages
Episode I – "The First Day of the Decade"	August 10, 2013	English, German, Russian
Notes: This is the story of Oliver Vertran - a boy who decided to punish his mother's killer. The chain of evidences leads him to the keys to the old secrets, connected with noble families, ancient magic, and forgotten horrible crimes.
Episode II – Clues From the Past	August 10, 2013	English, German, Russian
Notes: After ten years of investigation Oliver finds the first clue which raises two questions: What does the signature "V.F." mean and why is the killer's coat of arms stamped on his mother's ring?
Episode III - "Being a Killer"	August 13, 2013	English, German, Russian
Notes: The story turns out to be more complicated, and Oliver's adventure gets much more dangerous than before. A mysterious assistant joins the investigation, and her intentions seem to be good only at the first blush.
Episode IV - "The Gift"	April 1, 2015	English, German, Russian
Notes: The story is about to end. The motive of crime became clear, and all the persons involved start to come out of the shadows... But something seems wrong: Does the killer deserves punishment, or he is just a pawn in the cruel game started by noble families?
Episode V - "The Last Day of the Decade"	15 July 2015	English, German, Russian

== Development and release ==
Lostwood Games started to develop the game in 2012. Andrey Kniazev, the leader of the Russian team that created the game, spent $150,000 to develop Leviathan. Due to the themes of homosexuality and the current state of LGBT rights in Russia, the team initially had a hard time finding a publisher. However, they did find a publisher for the Nintendo 3DS and PlayStation Vita versions, but they lacked the money to make a port. The game features an opening song, composed by Gleb Kolyadin and Mikhail Kotov, and performed by Nikita Valamin and Maryana Semkina. The original Russian game has been translated into English and German. The German translations of the first two episodes were released in August 2013. In May 2014, they launched a crowdfunding project on Indiegogo to fund the final episode. Funding failed with the game only receiving $195 of the $49,500 goal. Nonetheless, the still want to create the last episode and finish the translations for episode 4 and 5. The game was released on Steam on November 11, 2014. In November 2015, they launched another crowdfunding project on Indiegogo with a goal of $2,000 in order to finish the English translation of the last episode. Funding failed again with the game only receiving $429.

== Sequel ==
In October 2015, the developers announced Leviathan: The Cargo, which continues the story set in the world of Leviathan. The visual novel game features characters from Leviathan: The Last Day of the Decade and new ones. The game was released in early access in 2016 and proceeded to get several small updates over the coming months, the last one being in early 2017, after which the game was indefinitely put on hold. As of July 2023, Lostwood Games no longer has a website and only maintains minimal presence on twitter, with its only recent post in last three years listing the death of one of the creators.
