= The New Leviathan Oriental Fox-Trot Orchestra =

Dance band from New Orleans

The New Leviathan Oriental Fox-Trot Orchestra is an American revival orchestra that performs authentic orchestrations of vintage American popular music from the 1890s through the early 1930s. The orchestra plays particular attention to the music of New Orleans, Louisiana, where it is based. In addition to the well known compositions of jazz and ragtime composers like Jelly Roll Morton, Fletcher Henderson, and Eubie Blake, the orchestra's repertory includes the work of less well remembered New Orleans Tin Pan Alley composers such as Larry Buck, Joe Verges, Paul Sarebresole, and Nick Clesi.

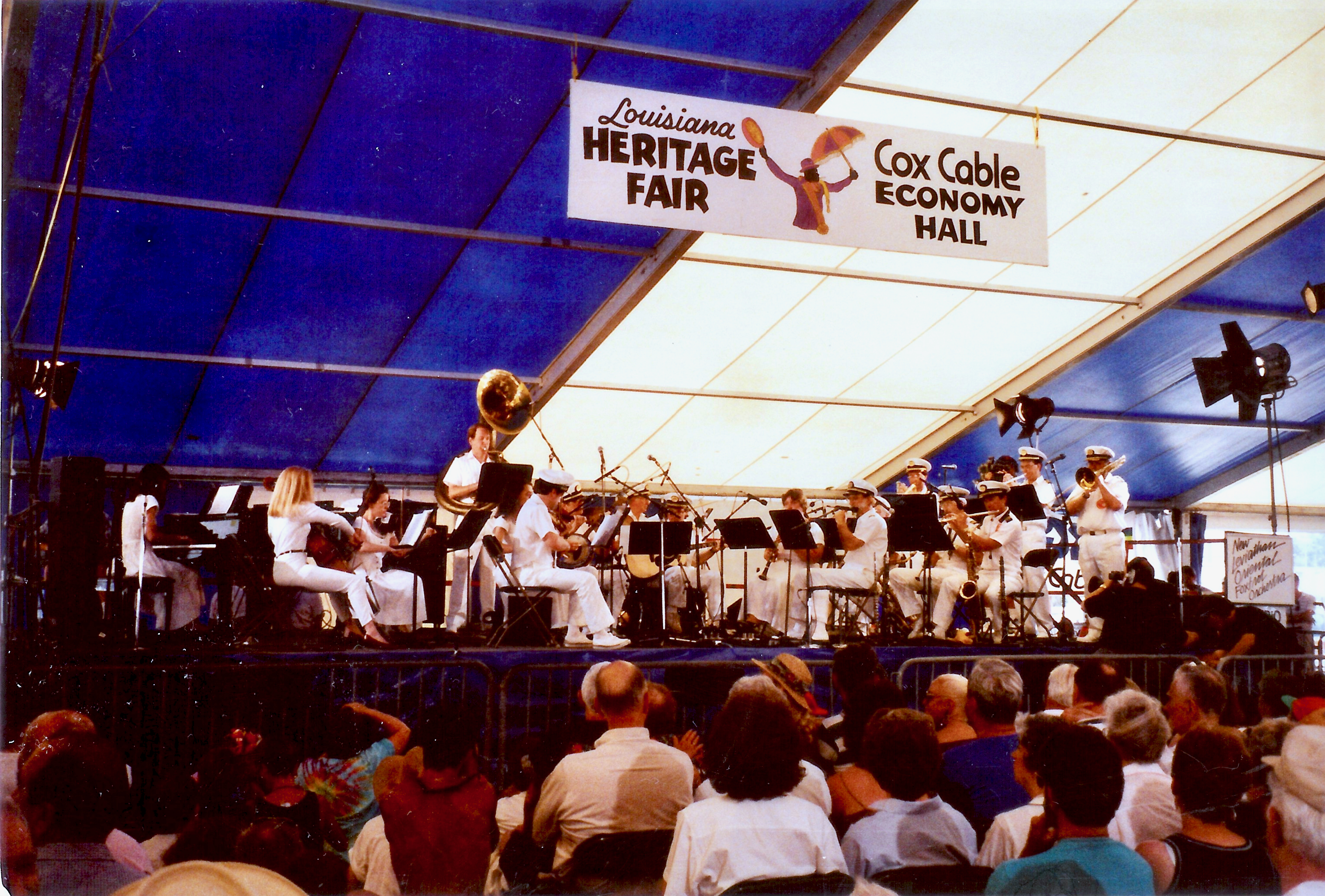
The New Leviathan on the Economy Hall Stage, New Orleans Jazz & Heritage Festival.

The orchestra was founded in 1972. It took its name from the SS Leviathan, a transatlantic ocean liner with a well-regarded dance band at the start of the 1920s. Their first performance was at Tulane University, presenting a rather tongue-in-cheek concert of "best loved Oriental Foxtrots" (a then largely forgotten early 20th-century dance music genre), partially satirizing the then-current revival of scholarly interest in classic ragtime.

The orchestra has appeared in Europe and throughout the United States. Recordings were featured in the soundtracks of Woody Allen's 1994 film Bullets over Broadway and Storyville (1992), directed by Mark Frost. New Leviathan performs frequently, and makes a fondly anticipated yearly appearance at the New Orleans Jazz & Heritage Festival. The exact personnel of the orchestra varies, but it frequently features 18 or more pieces.

== Discography ==
- An Oriental Extravaganza (1972)
- I Ain't Gonna Give Nobody None o' This Jelly Roll/Rebecca Came Back From Mecca (1975) 45 rpm single
- From New Orleans to Constantinople on the S. S. Leviathan (1975) Remastered and reissued in 2007
- Old King Tut (1977) Remastered and reissued in 2001
- I Didn't Mean Goodbye (1980)
- Here Comes The Hot Tamale Man (1989)
- The Nina, The Pinta, and the S.S. Leviathan (1992)
- Favorites (2000)
- Burning Sands (1977), (2000), (2003)
