= List of Austin City Limits performers =

Musicians appearing on Austin City Limits

This list of Austin City Limits performers is a list of musicians who have appeared on the American PBS television music program Austin City Limits. Also listed are years in which they appeared. This list does not include performers who otherwise may have appeared at the annual Austin City Limits Music Festival, but who did not appear on the PBS television program.

== 0–9 ==
- 8½ Souvenirs (1998)

== A ==
- Alien Love Child (2001)
- The Acoustic Warriors (1992)
- Ryan Adams and The Cardinals (2006)
- Trace Adkins (1998)
- Alabama (1981)
- Alabama Shakes (2012, 2016)
- Christine Albert (1994)
- Terry Allen (1985, 1998)
- The Allman Brothers Band (1996)
- Dave Alvin (1999)
- Amazing Rhythm Aces (1977)
- Trey Anastasio (2005)
- John Anderson (1982, 1984, 1994)
- Jessica Andrews (2003)
- Andrus, Blackwood and Company (1983)
- Arcade Fire (2007, 2010)
- Arctic Monkeys (2018)
- Susan Ashton (2000)
- Asleep at the Wheel (1976, 1978, 1981, 1986 "Reunion", 1988, 1993, 1996, 1998, 2002, 2009 with Willie Nelson)
- Chet Atkins (1978, 1982, 1987, 1991, 1993, 1997 "Legends" classic encore)
- The Avett Brothers (2010, 2015)
- Hoyt Axton (1979)

== B ==
- Joan Baez (1994)
- Razzy Bailey (1981)
- Balcones Fault (1976)
- David Ball (1995, 1997 with Lyle Lovett)
- Marcia Ball (1976, 1979, 1986 "Reunion", 1990, 1997 with Lyle Lovett, 1998)
- Moe Bandy (1980, 1988)
- Band of Heathens (2009)
- Bobby Bare (1979, 1981)
- Gnarls Barkley (2008)
- Lou Ann Barton (1990 with W. C. Clark Blues Revue, 2001 with Double Trouble)
- BeauSoleil (1990)
- Beck (2003, 2008, 2014)
- Vince Bell (2000 with Lyle Lovett)
- The Bellamy Brothers (1982, 1988)
- Ray Benson (2000 with Clint Black)
- Dierks Bentley (2008)
- Matraca Berg (1999)
- Byron Berline (1979)
- Beto y Los Fairlanes (1980)
- Billy Strings (2021)
- Ryan Bingham (2009)
- Andrew Bird (2009)
- Björk (2007)
- Clint Black (2000)
- Lisa Hartman Black (2000 with Clint Black)
- The Black Angels (2016 with Jim James)
- The Black Keys (2010, 2014)
- Blind Boys of Alabama (2002)
- Rory Block (1994)
- Bloc Party (2007)
- Blue Rodeo (2002)
- Bobby Blue Bland (1999)
- Blues Traveler (2006)
- James Blunt (2007)
- Suzy Bogguss (1993)
- Ponty Bone and the Squeezetones (1987)
- Libbi Bosworth (1997 "Country Showcase")
- Billy Bragg (1999)
- Doyle Bramhall II (2000, 2001 with Double Trouble)
- Thom Bresh (1987 with Chet Atkins), & Lane Brody (1988)
- Bobby Bridger (1976, 1978)
- Phoebe Bridgers (2021)
- Bright Eyes (2005)
- Lane Brody (1988 with Thom Bresh)
- Garth Brooks (1990, 2000 twice)
- Brooks & Dunn (2001)
- BR5-49 (1997)
- Clarence "Gatemouth" Brown (1977, 1978, 1980, 1996, 2001 "Big Blues Extravaganza" classic encore)
- Junior Brown (1995, 1997 with Lyle Lovett, 1998, 1999)
- Ruth Brown (1999)
- Sawyer Brown (1986)
- Jackson Browne (2002, 2021)
- Ed Bruce (1981)
- Roy Buchanan (1977)
- Buena Vista Social Club (2001 with Ibrahim Ferrer)
- Norton Buffalo (1979)
- Jimmy Buffett (1977, 1984)
- Jethro Burns (1981 "Mandolin Special")
- Tracy Byrd (1995, 1996 with Asleep at the Wheel)
- David Byrne (2002, 2008)

== C ==
- Café Tacuba (2006)
- Calexico (2006)
- Campanas de America (1999 "Mexican Roots Music")
- Glen Campbell (1985, 1997 "Legends" classic encore)
- Ray Campi (1976, 1984 with The LeRoi Brothers)
- Brandi Carlile (2010, 2018, 2022)
- Paulette Carlson (1990 "Will The Circle Be Unbroken")
- Larry Carlton (1987 with Chet Atkins)
- Joe Carrasco (1981)
- Carter Family (1987)
- The Carter Sisters (1990 "Will The Circle Be Unbroken")
- Carlene Carter (1994, 2000 "Women in Song" classic encore)
- Deana Carter (1999)
- Mary Chapin Carpenter (1990, 1992, 1993, 1994, 1997, 2000 "Women in Song" classic encore, 2001)
- Neko Case (2003, 2008, 2014)
- Johnny Cash (1987)
- June Carter Cash (1987)
- Rosanne Cash (1983 solo, & 1983 with Rodney Crowell, 1986 with Emmylou Harris, 1988, 1992, 1994, 2000 "Women in Song" classic encore, 2003, 2010 with Brandi Carlile)
- Tommy Cash (1987)
- Bill Caswell (1983)
- Cate Brothers (1979)
- Cat Power (2006)
- Kasey Chambers (2001)
- Manu Chao (2008, 2009)
- Tracy Chapman (2003)
- Ray Charles (1980, 1984, 1997 "Legends" classic encore)
- Cheap Trick (2011)
- C. J. Chenier and the Red Hot Louisiana Band (1992)
- Clifton Chenier and the Red Hot Louisiana Band (1976, 1979)
- Mark Chesnutt (1995)
- The Civil Wars (2012)
- Guy Clark (1977, 1982, 1983, 1990, 1998, 2000 classic encore & 2000 with Lyle Lovett)
- Gary Clark, Jr. (2007 with Jimmie Vaughan and Kim Wilson), (2012), (2015)
- Roy Clark (1980, 1982, 1997 "Legends" classic encore)
- W. C. Clark Blues Revue (1990, 2001 classic encore with Stevie Ray Vaughan and 2001 "Big Blues Extravaganza" classic encore)
- Jack Clement (1998, 2000 classic encore)
- Vassar Clements (1978, 1979, 1990 "Will The Circle Be Unbroken")
- Cluster Pluckers (1991 with Chet Atkins)
- Hank Cochran (1980, 1981 "Encore")
- Bruce Cockburn (1992)
- Joe Cocker (2000)
- David Allan Coe (1984)
- Leonard Cohen (1989, 1994, classic encore 2001)
- Marc Cohn (1993)
- Coldplay (2005, 2011)
- Mark Collie (1991)
- Albert Collins (1992, 2001 "Big Blues Extravaganza" classic encore)
- Collins Sisters (1984 "Legends")
- Shawn Colvin (1991, 1995, 1997 with Lyle Lovett, 2000 "Women in Song" classic encore, 2001)
- John Conlee (1983)
- Earl Thomas Conley (1983, 1985)
- Ry Cooder (1976)
- Shemekia Copeland (2001)
- Elvis Costello (2004, 2009)
- Elizabeth Cotten (1979, 2001 "Big Blues Extravaganza" classic encore)
- Cowboy Junkies (1991)
- Floyd Cramer (1984, 1997 "Legends" classic encore)
- The Robert Cray Band (1991, 2000)
- The Crickets (1989, 1998)
- A. J. Croce (1996)
- Alvin Crow and the Pleasant Valley Boys (1976, 1979)
- Sheryl Crow (1997, 2000 "Women in Song" classic encore, 2004)
- Crowded House (2008)
- Rodney Crowell (1982, 1983, 1989, 1994 with Willie Nelson, 1998, 2000 classic encore, 2004)
- Jamie Cullum (2004)
- Mary Cutrufello (1997 "Country Showcase", 1999)

== D ==
- Lacy J. Dalton (1981, 1986 with Emmylou Harris)
- Charlie Daniels Band (1976, 1978, 1981, 1989, 1996 with Asleep at the Wheel)
- Clay Davidson (2000)
- Gail Davies (1980, 1984, 1986 with Emmylou Harris)
- Ray Davies (2006)
- Billy Dean (1994)
- Death Cab for Cutie (2006)
- The Decemberists (2007, 2011)
- Mos Def (2010)
- Dan Del Santo (1979)
- Iris DeMent (1995, 1996 with Willie Nelson, 2000 "Women in Song" classic encore)
- Denim (1977)
- John Denver (1990 & 1990 "Will The Circle Be Unbroken")
- The Derailers (1997 "Country Showcase", 2000)
- Desert Rose Band (1988)
- Diamond Rio (1994)
- The Dillards (1978)
- Dirty Dozen Brass Band (1994)
- Dixie Chicks (1999, 2001, 2007, 2013 [KLRU Benefit])
- Fats Domino (1987, 1997 "Legends" classic encore, classic encore 2001)
- Double Trouble (1983 & 1989 with Stevie Ray Vaughan, 2001, 2003)
- Dr. John (1993)
- Drive-By Truckers (2009)
- Duffy (singer) (2009)
- Holly Dunn (1988, 1992)
- Jakob Dylan (2008, 2009)
- Davis Rockers Open House (2016)
- Doja Cat (2021)

== E ==
- Steve Earle (1987, 1998, 2000 classic encore, 2001, 2009)
- Anderson East (2018)
- Kat Edmonson (2013)
- Don Edwards (1991 "Salute to the Cowboy")
- Kathleen Edwards (2005)
- Billie Eilish (2020)
- Mark Eitzel (1998 with Indigo Girls)
- Eric Johnson (guitarist) (1984, 1988)
- Joe Ely (1980, 1985, 1991, 1996, 1999 "Mexican Roots Music", 2000 solo, and also with The Flatlanders)
- Roky Erickson (2008)
- Alejandro Escovedo (2002, solo 2006 and also with the band Rank and File)
- Pete Escovedo (2002 "By the Hand of the Father")
- Sara Evans (2001)
- Skip Ewing (1989)
- Exile (1985)
- Explosions in the Sky (2007)

== F ==
- The Fabulous Thunderbirds (1984, 1987)
- Fastball (1999)
- Femi Kuti (2007)
- Freddy Fender (1995, 1999 "Mexican Roots Music")
- Franz Ferdinand (2005)
- Ibrahim Ferrer Orchestra (2001)
- Firefall (1977)
- The Flaming Lips (2004)
- The Flatlanders (2002)
- Béla Fleck and the Flecktones (1992, solo 2000)
- Flor de Toloache (2024)
- Fleet Foxes (2012)
- Kye Fleming (1989)
- Flogging Molly (2011)
- Florence and the Machine (2012 with Lykke Li, 2016 with Andra Day )
- Rosie Flores (1989, 2002 "By the Hand of the Father")
- Flyleaf (2008)
- John Fogerty (2004)
- Ben Folds (2005)
- Foo Fighters (2008, 2015, 2023)
- Steve Forbert (1993)
- The Forester Sisters (1988)
- Radney Foster (1994)
- Ruthie Foster (2003)
- Foster & Lloyd (1988, 1991)
- Guy Forsyth (2008 with Carolyn Wonderland)
- Pete Fountain (1982)
- Fountains of Wayne (2003)
- Denny Freeman (1990 with the W. C. Clark Blues Revue)
- Janie Fricke (1980, 1983)
- Kinky Friedman & the Texas Jewboys (1976 show never broadcast)
- David Frizzell & Shelly West (1983)
- Steve Fromholz (1976, 1977, 1979, 1986 "Reunion", 2000 with Lyle Lovett)
- Robbie Fulks (1998)
- Future Islands (2015)

== G ==
- Larry Gatlin (1977, 1982, 1985, 1988)
- Danny Gatton (1992)
- The Geezinslaws (1976, 1982, 1986, 1989)
- Ghostland Observatory (2007, 2009)
- Terry Gibbs (1982)
- Eliza Gilkyson (1984, 2001)
- Vince Gill (1985, 1992, 1995, 1999, 2003)
- Mickey Gilley (1983)
- Jimmie Dale Gilmore (1983, 1989, 1992, 1997 with Lyle Lovett, and also with The Flatlanders)
- Johnny Gimble (1980, 1981 "Mandolin Special", 1987 with Chet Atkins, 1991 with Chet Atkins, 1993, 1996 with Asleep at the Wheel)
- Paul Glasse (1994)
- Julie Gold (1992)
- Rubén González (2001 with Ibrahim Ferrer)
- Steve Goodman (1978, 1983 with John Prine, 1985 tribute encore)
- John Gorka (1993)
- Vern Gosdin (1986)
- The Gourds (2006)
- Gove (1977, 1978)
- David Gray (2001)
- Mark Gray (1985)
- Great Plains (1993)
- Pat Green (2003)
- Lee Greenwood (1984)
- Greezy Wheels (1976, St. Greezy's Wheel 1986 "Reunion")
- Patty Griffin (2000 with Emmylou Harris, 2001, 2004)
- Nanci Griffith (1985, 1989, 1992, 1995, 1998 twice, 1999, 2000 "Women in Song" & 2000 Townes Van Zandt classic encores, 2001)
- David Grisman Quintet (1981)
- Grupo Fantasma (2007)
- Guided by Voices (2004)
- Guster (2004)
- Buddy Guy (1991, 1998, 2001 "Big Blues Extravaganza" classic encore, 2003, 2018)

== H ==
- Merle Haggard (1978, 1982, 1984, 1986, 1991, 1994 best of, 1996 & 1996 with Willie Nelson, 2000)
- Tom T. Hall (1979)
- David Halley (1983, 1997 with Lyle Lovett)
- John Hammond (1991, 2002)
- Lionel Hampton & His Orchestra (1999)
- Butch Hancock (1983)
- Wayne Hancock (1997 "Country Showcase")
- Linda Hargrove (1978)
- Ben Harper (2004)
- Emmylou Harris (1977,1982, 1986, 1989, 1993, 1998, 2000 & 2000 classic encore)
- John Hartford (1978)
- Alex Harvey (1977)
- Wade Hayes (1996 with Asleep at the Wheel, 1997)
- The Head and the Heart (2012,2017)
- Eric Heatherly (2000)
- Heartless Bastards (2009)
- Don Henley (2015)
- John Hiatt (1989, 1994, 2000)
- Sara Hickman (1991)
- Dan Hicks & the Hot Licks (1992)
- David Hidalgo (1999 "Mexican Roots Music")
- Highway 101 (1988)
- Faith Hill (1996)
- Tish Hinojosa (1990, 1993, 1999 "Mexican Roots Music", 2000 "Women in Song" classic encore)
- Peter Holsapple (1999)
- Champ Hood (1997 with Lyle Lovett)
- Hootie and the Blowfish (1999)
- Lightnin' Hopkins (1979)
- Bruce Hornsby (1994, 1999, 2001 solo & with Shawn Colvin)
- Hot Rize (1987)
- Harlan Howard (1989)
- Con Hunley (1983)
- Walter Hyatt (1991, 1997 classic encore)

== I ==
- Indigenous (2000)
- Indigo Girls (1992, 1998)
- Jack Ingram (1997)
- Iron & Wine (2008)
- Jason Isbell (2014, 2017)
- Chris Isaak (2002)

== J ==
- Alan Jackson (1991, 1995)
- Etta James (2005)
- Jim James (2016 with The Black Angels)
- Sarah Jarosz (2010, 2014, 2021)
- The Jayhawks (2004)
- Jazzmanian Devil (1982)
- Herb Jeffries (1996 with Michael Martin Murphey)
- Waylon Jennings (1985, 1990, 1997 with Kris Kristofferson)
- Jewel (2000)
- Jim and Jesse (1986 with Bill Monroe, 1997 classic encore)
- Flaco Jiménez (1976, 1980, 1995, 1999 "Mexican Roots Music")
- Santiago Jiménez, Jr. (1987)
- Eric Johnson (1984, 1988, 1997, 2000 with Clint Black, 2001)
- Jack Johnson (2005)
- Freedy Johnston (1998 with Indigo Girls)
- George Jones (1981, 1986, 1990)
- Norah Jones (2002, 2007, 2013)
- Sharon Jones & The Dap-Kings (2008)
- Esteban Jordan (1979)
- Stanley Jordan (1989)
- Juanes (2006)
- Wynonna Judd (1997)
- The Judds (1985)
- Valerie June (2014)

== K ==
- Noah Kahan (2024)
- Keane (2005)
- Robert Earl Keen (1989, 1995, 1997, 2000 with Lyle Lovett, 2001)
- Garrison Keillor & the Hopeful Gospel Quartet (1993)
- Toby Keith (2001)
- The Kendalls (1984)
- Mary Ann Kennedy (1986 with Emmylou Harris)
- Doug Kershaw (1979)
- Hal Ketchum (1992, 1994, 1998)
- Khruangbin (2021)
- Rilo Kiley (2005)
- The Killers (2005)
- Killer Queen (feat. Patrick Myers) (2017)
- Rock Killough (1980 edited out of broadcast)
- Killough & Eckley (1978)
- Kimbra (2012)
- B.B. King (1983, 1996, 2001 "Big Blues Extravaganza" classic encore)
- Pee Wee King (1984 "Legends")
- Shelley King (2008 with Carolyn Wonderland)
- Kings of Leon (2008)
- Kiwi (1977)
- K'naan (2010)
- Leo Kottke (1981, 1988, 1993)
- Alison Krauss & Union Station (1992, 1996, 2000, 2001 w/ Shawn Colvin, 2002, 2005)
- Kris Kristofferson (1982, 1997)
- Ben Kweller (2003)

== L ==
- La Diferenzia (1995)
- Ladysmith Black Mambazo (2006)
- Jimmy LaFave (1996)
- Kendrick Lamar (2016)
- Miranda Lambert (2006, 2011, 2017)
- Ray LaMontagne (2005)
- Red Lane (1980, 1981 "Encore")
- Jonny Lang (1999, 2001 with Double Trouble, 2003)
- k.d. lang and the reclines (1988)
- Bettye LaVette (2008)
- Tracy Lawrence (1993)
- LCD Soundsystem (2018)
- Amos Lee (2005)
- Brenda Lee (1987)
- Johnny Lee (1982)
- The LeRoi Brothers (1984)
- Jerry Lee Lewis (1983)
- Little Feat (1991)
- Lisa Loeb (1996)
- Little Joe y La Familia (1979)
- Los Lobos (1989, 1992, 1996, 2002, 2014)
- Los Lonely Boys (2004, 2006)
- Los Super Seven (1999 "Mexican Roots Music")
- The Lost Gonzo Band (1976, 1978, 1986 "Reunion")
- Lyle Lovett & His Large Band (1987, 1990, 1993, 1994 with Willie Nelson, 1995, 1997, 1998, 2000, 2000 classic encore, 2001 w/ Shawn Colvin, 2004, 2008 w/ John Hiatt, Guy Clark and Joe Ely for "A Songwriters Special")
- Patty Loveless (1989, 1994, 1998, 2001)
- Nick Lowe (2009)
- Loretta Lynn (1983, 1997 "Legends" classic encore, 1998)
- Shelby Lynne (1991, 2000)
- Lynyrd Skynyrd (2000)
- Lykke Li With (2012, with Florence + the Machine)

== M ==
- Taj Mahal (1979, 1993)
- The Maines Brothers Band (1985)
- Louise Mandrell (1986)
- The Manhattan Transfer (1998)
- Aimee Mann (2008)
- Joe Maphis (1984 "Legends")
- Rose Maphis (1984 "Legends")
- Damian "Junior Gong" Marley (2007)
- Jimmy Martin (1990 "Will The Circle Be Unbroken")
- Steve Martin (2010 with Sarah Jarosz and Steep Canyon Rangers)
- Will T. Massey (1992)
- Masters of Bluegrass (1991)
- Kathy Mattea (1987, 1990, 1993)
- Dave Matthews (2000 with Emmylou Harris)
- Dave Matthews Band (2009)
- The Mavericks (1995, 2000)
- John Mayall (1993)
- John Mayer (2003, 2007)
- Martina McBride (1999)
- McBride & The Ride (1991)
- Paul McCartney (2018)
- Charly McClain (1982)
- Delbert McClinton (1977, 1979, 1983, 1989, 1993, 1996 with Asleep at the Wheel, 1997, 2001 "Big Blues Extravaganza" classic encore, 2002)
- Del McCoury Band (2001)
- Mel McDaniel (1986)
- Michael McDonald (2004)
- Reba McEntire (1988)
- John McEuen (1979)
- Tim McGraw (2013)
- Roger McGuinn (1986)
- Sarah McLachlan (2009)
- Don McLean (1982)
- James McMurtry (1990, 2007)
- Natalie Merchant (2002)
- Tift Merritt (2006)
- Pat Metheny Group (1977, 2003)
- Augie Meyers (1976)
- The Milk Carton Kids (2014)
- Bill Miller (1995)
- Buddy Miller (2000 with Emmylou Harris)
- Julie Miller (2000 with Emmylou Harris)
- Roger Miller (1983, classic encores 1996, 1997 "Legends" classic encore)
- Malford Milligan (2001 with Double Trouble)
- Ronnie Milsap (1987)
- Parker Millsap (2017)
- Richard Mirabal (1996 with Michael Martin Murphey)
- Waddie Mitchell (1991 "Salute to the Cowboy")
- Keb' Mo' (1996, 2001 solo & 2001 "Big Blues Extravaganza" classic encore)
- Bill Monroe (1981, 1986, 1997 classic encore & "Legends" classic encore)
- Tiny Moore (1981 "Mandolin Special")
- Allison Moorer (1997 with Lyle Lovett, 2001)
- Gary Morris (1984, 1986)
- Modest Mouse (2005)
- John Michael Montgomery (1994)
- Monte Montgomery (1999)
- Lorrie Morgan (1990)
- My Morning Jacket (2006, 2008)
- Gary Morris (1990)
- Van Morrison (2006)
- Cory Morrow (2003)
- Mother of Pearl (1978)
- Jason Mraz (2003)
- Oliver Mtukudzi (2002 with Bonnie Raitt)
- Michael Martin Murphey (1978, 1981, 1983, 1987, 1990 "Will The Circle Be Unbroken", 1991 "Salute to the Cowboy", 1996, 2000 with Lyle Lovett)
- Mumford & Sons (2011)
- Muse (2006)
- Kacey Musgraves (2018)

== N ==
- The Nash Ramblers (1993)
- Nashville Super Pickers (1979)
- The National (2012)
- Joel Nava (1995)
- Tracy Nelson (1977, 1986 "Reunion", 1998)
- Willie Nelson (1975 performed on first program, 1977, 1980, 1981 "Encore", 1982, 1984, 1991, 1994, 1996 "Classic Encore", 1996 & 1996 with Asleep at the Wheel, 1997 with Kris Kristofferson, 1998, 2000, 2000 "Classic Encore" & 2009 with Asleep at the Wheel)
- Michael Nesmith (1993)
- The Neville Brothers (1979, 1986, 1995)
- New Grass Revival (1984, 1988, 1990 "Will The Circle Be Unbroken")
- New Orleans Social Club (2006)
- Nine Inch Nails (2013)
- Joanna Newsom (2012)
- Juice Newton (1985)
- Joe Nichols (2003)
- Nickel Creek (2001, 2002, 2015)
- Nick Lowe (2008)
- The Nitty Gritty Dirt Band (1977, 1985, 1988, 1990)
- Gary P. Nunn (1983, 1986 "Reunion", 1989, 1995)
- Paolo Nutini (2007)

== O ==
- Oak Ridge Boys (1985)
- Oasis (2005)
- Maura O'Connell (1992)
- The O'Kanes (1988)
- Oklahoma City Philharmonic (1996)
- Okkervil River (2009)
- Old 97's (1998)
- Old Crow Medicine Show (2007)
- David Olney and the X-Rays (1982)
- Omar & the Howlers (1987)
- Roy Orbison (1983, 1997 "Legends" classic encore)
- Rick Orozco (1995)
- Joan Osborne (2001)
- K. T. Oslin (1989, 1992)
- Peter Ostroushko (1987 with Chet Atkins)
- Buck Owens (1989, 1997 "Legends" classic encore)
- Ozomatli (2004)

== P ==
- Pablo Cruise
- Brad Paisley (2000, 2001, 2008)
- Lee Roy Parnell (1993, 1996)
- Dolly Parton (2001)
- Passenger (1981)
- Johnny Paycheck (1980)
- Pearl Jam (2009)
- Tony Perez (1989)
- Carl Perkins (1980, 1990, 1997 "Legends" classic encore)
- Madeleine Peyroux (2009)
- Phantom Buffalo
- Phish (2000)
- Phoenix (2009)
- Pinetop Perkins (2008)
- Pixies (2005)
- Robert Plant (2002, 2016)
- The Polyphonic Spree (2004, 2008)
- Portugal. The Man (2013)
- Cat Power (2007)
- Freddie Powers (1984, 1985, 1986, 1996 with Willie Nelson)
- Prairie Home Companion Band (1987 with Chet Atkins)
- Ray Price (1980, 1981, 1999)
- Toni Price (2000)
- Charley Pride (1981)
- John Prine (1978, 1983 with Steve Goodman, 1988, 1992, 1996, 2002 with Bonnie Raitt, 2005, 2018)
- Chuck Prophet (2003)
- Pure Prairie League (1979)

== Q ==
- Queen Ida and the Bon Temps Band (1987)
- Queens of The Stone Age (2015)

== R ==
- R.E.M. (2008, later released as R.E.M. Live from Austin, TX)
- Eddie Rabbitt (1985)
- The Raconteurs (2006, 2019)
- Radiohead (2012)
- Corinne Bailey Rae (2006)
- Bonnie Raitt (2002, 2014, 2024)
- Ruben Ramos (1999 "Mexican Roots Music", 2002 "By the Hand of the Father")
- Willis Alan Ramsey (1977, 1997 with Lyle Lovett, 2001)
- Robert Randolph & the Family Band (2002, 2004)
- Rank and File (1983)
- RatDog (2002)
- Eddy Raven (1985)
- David Rawlings
- Collin Raye (1998)
- Leon Redbone (1979)
- Jerry Reed (1982)
- Mike Reid (1989, 1993)
- Restless Heart (1987)
- Kimmie Rhodes (1997 with Kris Kristofferson)
- Damien Rice (2004)
- Zachary Richard (1994)
- Kim Richey (1998, 2000 "Women in Song" classic encore)
- Riders in the Sky (1981, 1987, 1991 "Salute to the Cowboy", 1993)
- Rilo Kiley (2005)
- Marty Robbins (1980, classic encores 1996, 1997 "Legends" classic encore)
- Butch Robins (1981, banjo player with Bill Monroe & The Blue Grass Boys)
- Charlie Robison (1999, 2001)
- The Roches
- Rockin' Sidney (1986)
- Judy Rodman (1987)
- Olivia Rodrigo (2021)
- Carrie Rodriguez (2008)
- Johnny Rodriguez (1978, 1981, 1984)
- Kenny Rogers (2000)
- Maggie Rogers (2024)
- Roy Rogers (2002 with Bonnie Raitt)
- Cesar Rosas (1999 "Mexican Roots Music")
- Kennedy Rose (1991)
- Pam Rose (1986 with Emmylou Harris)
- Peter Rowan (1998, 2000 classic encore)
- Leon Russell (1987, 2000)
- Shake Russell Band (1980)

== S ==
- Doug Sahm (1976, with a re-united Sir Douglas Quintet, and also with The Texas Tornados 1990)
- B. Savage (1979)
- Boz Scaggs (1998)
- Don Schlitz (1989)
- Bob Schneider (2001)
- John Schneider (1986)
- Schuyler, Knobloch & Bickhardt (1988)
- Earl Scruggs (1977, 2000 with Marty Stuart, 2000 with Bela Fleck)
- Randy Scruggs (1990 "Will The Circle Be Unbroken")
- Charlie Sexton (2001 with Double Trouble, 2010 with Spoon)
- Will Sexton (1990 with the W. C. Clark Blues Revue)
- Whitey Shafer (1980, 1981 "Encore", 1985)
- Eldon Shamblin (1981 "Mandolin Special")
- Billy Joe Shaver (1980, 1983, 1985, 1997 with Kris Kristofferson)
- Robert Shaw (1979)
- Ricky Van Shelton (1988, 1991)
- Shenandoah (1990)
- Vonda Shepard (1998 with Indigo Girls)
- T. G. Sheppard (1983)
- Kenny Wayne Shepherd (1997)
- Ed Sheeran (2014)
- The Shins (2004)
- Amanda Shires (2017)
- Michelle Shocked (1990, 2000 "Women in Song" classic encore)
- Paul Simon (2016)
- Sir Douglas Quintet (1981)
- Ricky Skaggs (1982, 1985, 1988, 1995, 1998)
- Sleepy LaBeef (1984 with The LeRoi Brothers)
- Darden Smith (1988, 1994)
- Todd Snider (1996)
- Son Volt (1997)
- Sonic Youth (2010)
- Sons of the Pioneers (1984 "Legends")
- Sons of the San Joaquin (1991 "Salute to the Cowboy", 1996 with Michael Martin Murphey)
- Social Distortion (2011)
- Southern Pacific (1986)
- Esperanza Spalding (2009)
- Larry Sparks (1995)
- Regina Spektor (2007)
- Spoon (2002, 2005, 2010, 2014)
- St Vincent (2009, 2018, 2022)
- Joe Stampley (1980)
- Ralph Stanley (1980, 1986 with Bill Monroe, 1995, 1997 classic encore, 2002)
- Stars
- Sufjan Stevens (2006)
- B. W. Stevenson (1976)
- Gary Stewart (1981)
- Redd Stewart (1984 "Legends")
- Doug Stone (1992)
- Joss Stone (2004)
- Storyville (1998)
- George Strait (1982, 1984, 1986, 1989)
- The Strangers (1982)
- Angela Strehli (1990 with the W. C. Clark Blues Revue)
- Strength in Numbers (1990)
- The String Cheese Incident (2001)
- Marty Stuart (1979, 1987, 1990, 2000)
- The Subdudes (1992)
- Joe Sun (1980)
- Sweethearts of the Rodeo (1987, 1990)
- The Swell Season (2009)
- Taylor Swift (2007)
- Keith Sykes (1983)
- Sylvia (1986)

== T ==
- Eric Taylor (2000 with Lyle Lovett, 2002)
- Susan Tedeschi (1999, 2001 with Double Trouble, 2003)
- The Texas Playboys (1976, 1978, 1985)
- Texas Swing Pioneers (1980)
- Texas Tornados (1991, 2000)
- Thao & the Get Down Stay Down (2014)
- Them Crooked Vultures (2010)
- Thievery Corporation (2008)
- B. J. Thomas (1983)
- Irma Thomas (1998)
- Butch Thompson (1987 with Chet Atkins)
- Hank Thompson (1981 & 1981 "Encore", 1996 with Michael Martin Murphey, 1999)
- Richard Thompson (2001)
- George Thorogood and the Destroyers (1982)
- Sonny Throckmorton (1980, 1981 "Encore")
- Mel Tillis (1980, 1986)
- Pam Tillis (1993, 1996 & 1996 with Willie Nelson, 2000 with Marty Stuart)
- Floyd Tillman (1980, 1981 "Encore")
- Timbuk3 (1989)
- Tompall & the Glaser Brothers (1982)
- Allen Toussaint (2010)
- Merle Travis (1978, 1997 "Legends" classic encore)
- Randy Travis (1987)
- Rick Trevino (1995)
- Travis Tritt (1992, 1997)
- Ernest Tubb (1978)
- The Strokes (2010)
- Tanya Tucker (1986)
- KT Tunstall (2006)
- Turnpike Troubadours (2019)

== U ==
- Uncle Walt's Band (1980, 1997 classic encore)
- Uranium Savages (1976 ACL fundraiser)
- Keith Urban (2004)

== V ==
- John Van Zandt (1998, 2000 classic encore)
- Townes Van Zandt (1976, 1983, 1998 classic encore, 2000 classic encore)
- Jimmie Vaughan (1990 with W. C. Clark Blues Revue, 1995, 1999, 2001 solo & with Double Trouble), (2007)
- Stevie Ray Vaughan & Double Trouble (1983, 1989, 1995 retrospective, 2001 outtakes & 2001 "Big Blues Extravaganza" classic encore)
- Suzanne Vega (1994, 2000 "Women in Song" classic encore)
- Vintage Trouble (2016)

== W ==
- The Wagoneers (1988)
- Loudon Wainwright III (1988, 1999)
- Tom Waits (1979, classic encore 2000)
- Clay Walker (1998)
- Jerry Jeff Walker (1976, 1980, 1986 "Reunion", 1988)
- Don Walser (1997 "Country Showcase")
- The War on Drugs (2015, 2023)
- The War and Treaty (2021)
- Monte Warden (1994)
- Steve Wariner (1983, 1987, 1990)
- The Warren Brothers (2000)
- Dale Watson (1997 "Country Showcase")
- Doc Watson (1978)
- Gene Watson (1988)
- Gillian Welch (1997, 2004)
- Kevin Welch (1992)
- Kitty Wells (1984 "Legends")
- Dottie West (1984)
- Shelly West (1983) (with David Frizzell)
- What Made Milwaukee Famous (2005)
- Wheatfield (1976)
- Jack White (2013)
- Lavelle White (1997)
- Tony Joe White (1981)
- The Whites (1984, 1988)
- Whiskeytown (1998)
- Keith Whitley (1989)
- Widespread Panic (2000, 2006)
- Rusty Wier (1976, 1977, 1986 "Reunion")
- Wild Child (2018)
- Wilco (2000, 2005, 2007, 2012)
- Dar Williams (2001)
- Don Williams (1980, 1983)
- Hank Williams, Jr. (1980)
- Leona Williams (1982)
- Lucinda Williams (1990, 1992, 1999, 2000 "Women in Song" classic encore, 2007)
- Kelly Willis (1991, 1994, 2000)
- Bob Wills (1997 "Legends" classic encore)
- Gretchen Wilson (2006)
- Kim Wilson (1984 & 1987 with the Fabulous Thunderbirds, 1990 with the W. C. Clark Blues Revue), (2007)
- Jesse Winchester (1978)
- Steve Winwood (2003)
- Mac Wiseman (1986 with Bill Monroe, 1997 classic encore)
- Kate Wolf (1986)
- Lee Ann Womack (2000)
- Carolyn Wonderland (2008)
- Johnnie Wright (1984 "Legends")
- Mark Wright (1989)
- Tammy Wynette (1983, 1985, 1995)

== Y ==
- Trisha Yearwood (1992, 1996, 2000)
- Dwight Yoakam (1986, 1989)
- Faron Young (1984 "Legends")
- Neil Young (1985)

== Z ==
- Warren Zevon (1999)
