= Denny Freeman =

American guitarist (1944–2021)

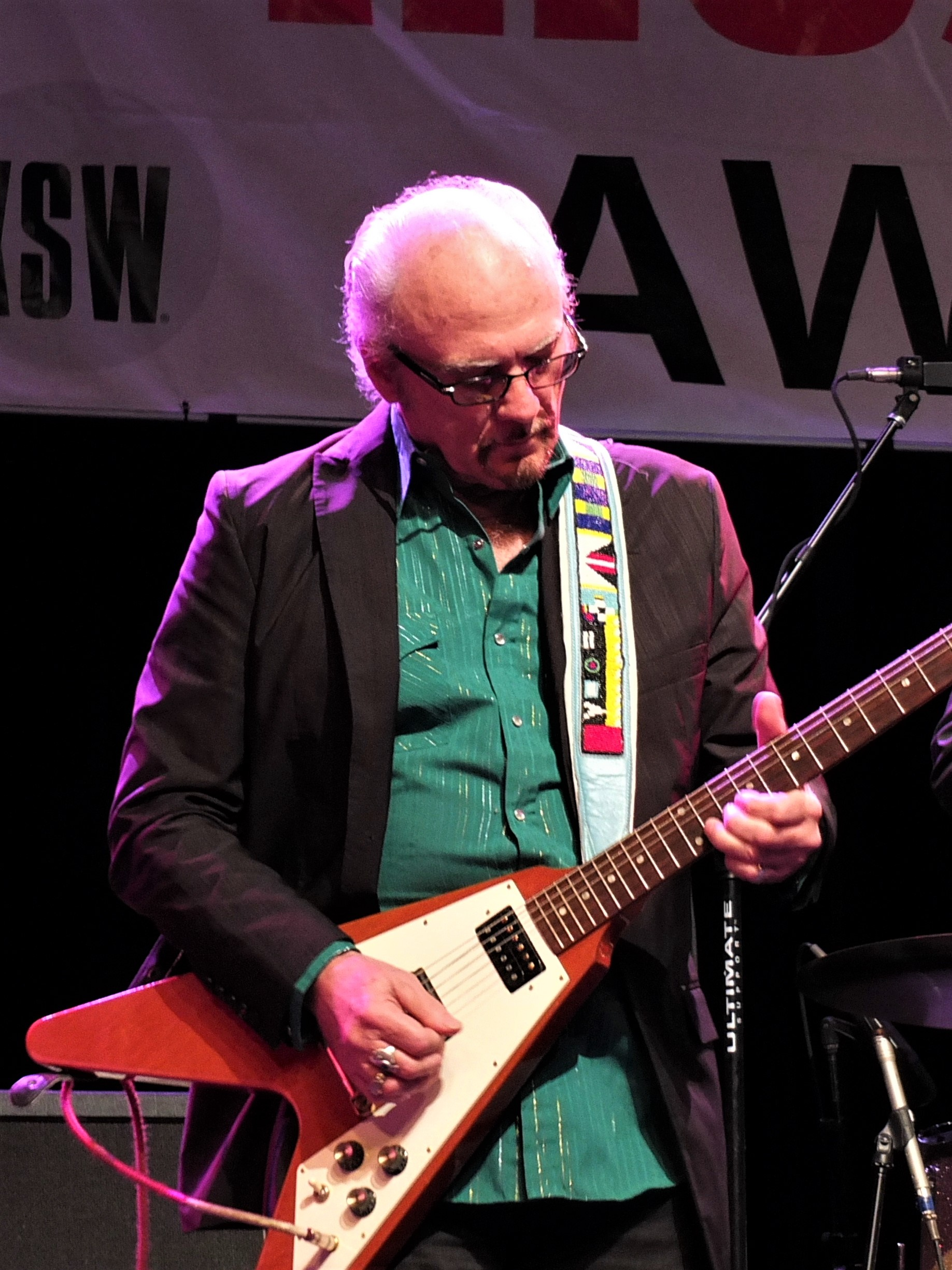
- Denny Freeman - Austin Music Awards - SXSW (2013).

Background information
- Born: Dennis Edward Freeman; August 7, 1944; Orlando, Florida, US
- Died: April 25, 2021 (aged 76) Austin, Texas, US
- Genres: Texas blues, electric blues
- Occupations: Guitarist, keyboardist, songwriter
- Instruments: Guitar, piano, organ
- Years active: 1970–2021
- Website: Official website

Dennis Edward Freeman (August 7, 1944 – April 25, 2021) was an American Texas and electric blues guitarist. Although he is primarily known as a guitar player, Freeman also played piano and electronic organ, both in concert and on various recordings. He worked with Stevie Ray Vaughan, Jimmie Vaughan, Bob Dylan, Angela Strehli, Lou Ann Barton, James Cotton, Taj Mahal, Barry Goldberg and Percy Sledge amongst others.

== Early life ==
Freeman was born in Orlando, Florida, on August 7, 1944. He spent his adolescence in Dallas, Texas, in the late 1950s and played in a rock group called The Corals while in high school. He went to college in North Texas, and had a brief stay in Los Angeles, before relocating in 1970 to Austin, Texas.

== Career ==
Freeman started his career as co-lead guitarist in the Cobras with Stevie Ray Vaughan. He became a founding member of Southern Feeling in 1972, along with W. C. Clark and Angela Strehli. He later recorded with Lou Ann Barton. Freeman lived and played with both Jimmie and Stevie Ray Vaughan throughout the 1970s and 1980s. He played piano on Jimmie Vaughan's first solo tour, and on a James Cotton album. At Antone's nightclub in the early 1980s, Freeman was a member of the house band and backed Otis Rush, Albert Collins, Buddy Guy, Junior Wells, and Lazy Lester.

After touring with Jimmie Vaughan in the mid 1990s he toured with Taj Mahal until 2002. A songwriter on his five mainly instrumental albums, Freeman lived again in Los Angeles from 1992 until 2004. Freeman played with Bob Dylan's backing band between 2005 and 2009. Dylan's album, Modern Times was recorded with Dylan's then touring band, including Freeman, Tony Garnier, George G. Receli, Stu Kimball, plus multi-instrumentalist Donnie Herron. During a 2006 interview with Rolling Stone, Dylan spoke about his current band:

This is the best band I've ever been in, I've ever had, man for man. When you play with guys a hundred times a year, you know what you can and can't do, what they're good at, whether you want 'em there. It takes a long time to find a band of individual players. Most bands are gangs. Whether it's a metal group or pop rock, whatever, you get that gang mentality. But for those of us who went back further, gangs were the mob. The gang was not what anybody aspired to. On this record (Modern Times) I didn't have anybody to teach. I got guys now in my band, they can whip up anything, they surprise even me.

— Bob Dylan, August 2006, Rolling Stone

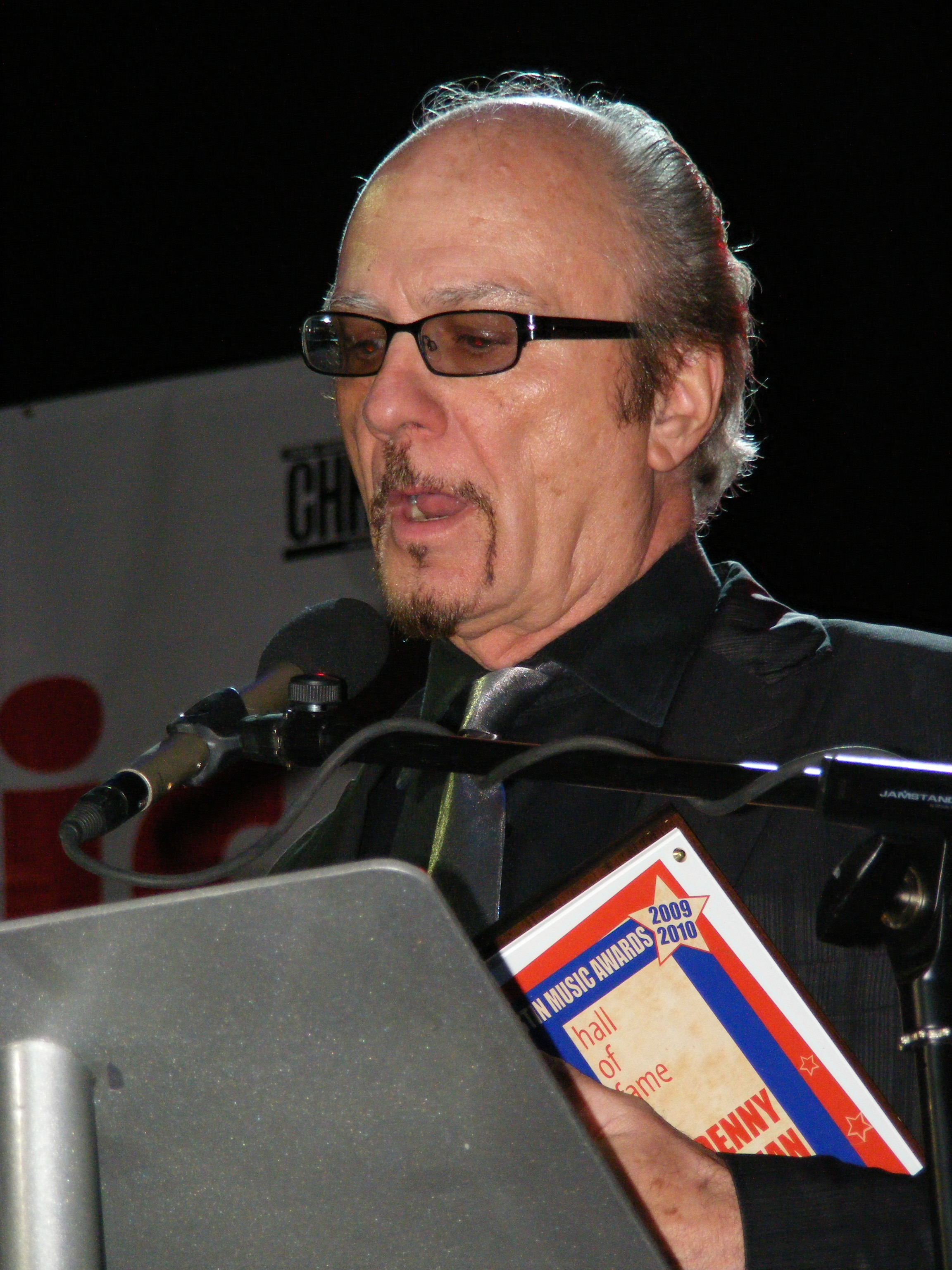
Denny Freeman - Austin Music Awards Hall of Fame Induction (2010).

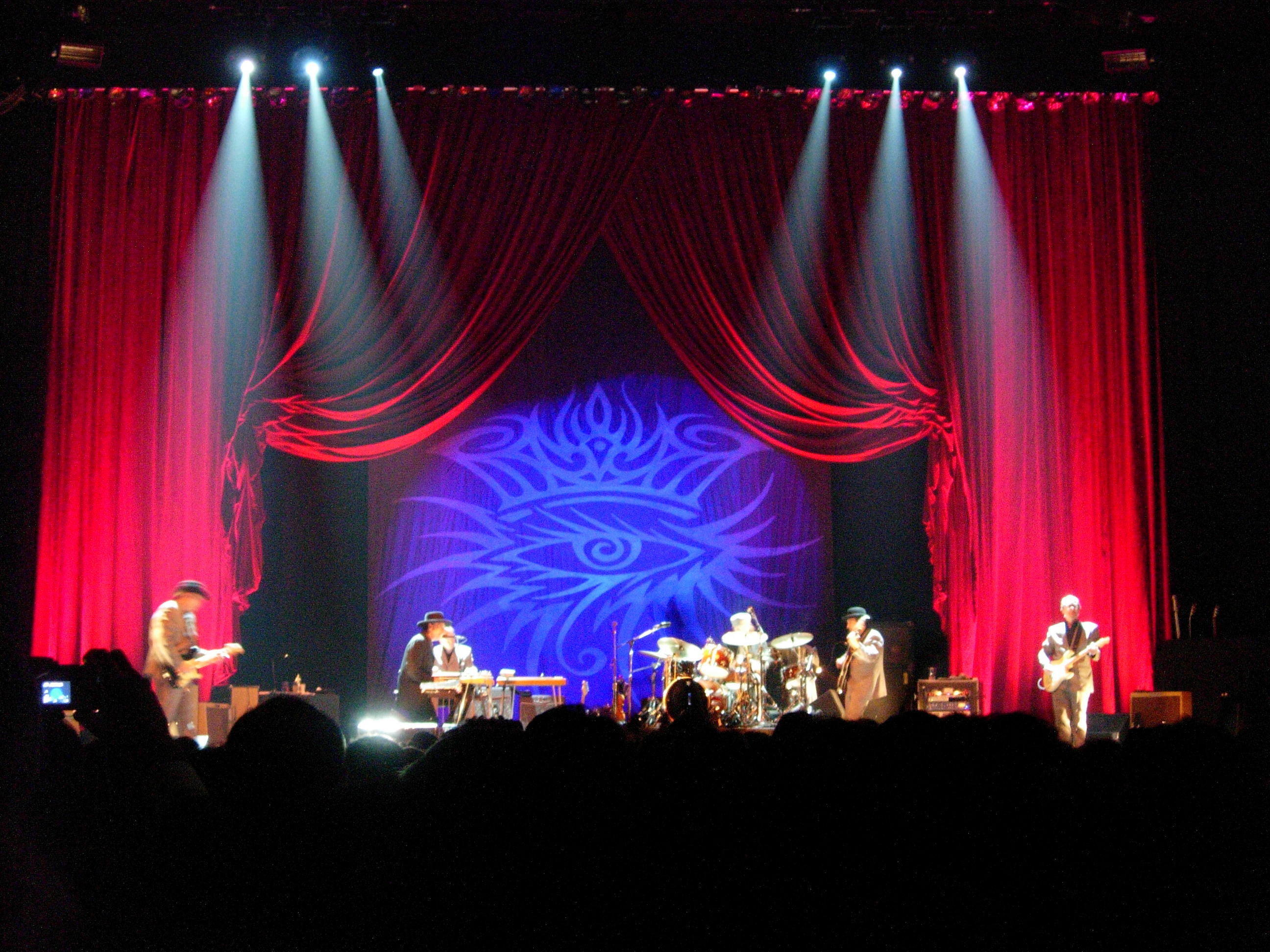
Stu Kimball, Bob Dylan, Donnie Herron, George Recile, Tony Garnier and Denny Freeman (L - R) performing in Bologna, Italy (2005)

Clem Burke played the drums on Freeman's solo offering, Twang Bang (2006).

== Later life ==
Freeman was inducted into the Austin Music Awards Hall of Fame in 2009.

Freeman died on April 25, 2021, in Austin, Texas. He was 76, and was diagnosed with abdominal cancer several weeks before his death.

== Credits ==
- Freeman co-wrote "Baboom/Mama Said" on The Vaughan Brothers' 1990 album, Family Style
- He played piano on Jimmie Vaughan's 1994 album, Strange Pleasure, and organ on his 1998 follow-up, Out There.
- He co-wrote "Boom Boom in the Zoom Zoom Room" on Blondie's 1999 No Exit album.
- Freeman played guitar on Taj Mahal and the Phantom Blues Band's Grammy Award winning live album, Shoutin' in Key (2000).
- He played guitar on Percy Sledge's 2004 album, Shining Through the Rain, and co-wrote with Fontaine Brown the song "Love Come and Rescue Me".
- He played guitar on Bob Dylan’s 2006 album Modern Times.
- Freeman played guitar, organ and piano on Doyle Bramhall's 2007 album, Is It News.
- He played guitar on two of Barry Goldberg's albums, Stoned Again (2002) and In the Groove (2018).

== Discography ==
- Blues Cruise (1986) – Amazing
- Out of the Blue (1987) – Amazing
- Denny Freeman (1991) – Amazing
- A Tone for My Sins (1997) – Dallas Blues Society
- Denny Freeman and the Cobras (live album) (2000) – Crosscut (Germany)
- Twang Bang (2006) – V8
- Diggin on Dylan (2012) – V8 Records

== See also ==
- List of Texas blues musicians
- List of electric blues musicians
- List of Austin City Limits performers
- Never Ending Tour
