= Too Much Fun =

Too Much Fun may refer to:

- "Too Much Fun" (song), a 1995 single by Daryle Singletary
- Too Much Fun!, a 1999 album by The Holy Modal Rounders
- Too Much Fun (album), a 1995 album by C. J. Chenier
- "Too Much Fun", a song by Billy Idol from the album Dream Into It
- "Too Much Fun", a song by Commander Cody and His Lost Planet Airmen from the album Live from Deep in the Heart of Texas
