= Monkey Land =

Studio album by Omar and the Howlers
- Released: February 1, 1990
- Recorded: August – September 1990
- Studios: Arlyn, Austin, Texas
- Genres: Blues, blues rock
- Label: Antone's
- Producer: Omar Dykes

Omar and the Howlers chronology
Wall of Pride (1988)	Monkey Land (1990)	Live at Paradiso (1992)

Monkey Land is an album by the American band Omar and the Howlers, released on February 1, 1990. They supported it with a North American tour.

== Production ==
Recorded in August and September 1990 at Arlyn Studios, in Austin, the album was produced by Omar; he rarely practiced his guitar playing in order to maintain a rough edge to the music. Omar was particularly influenced by Howlin' Wolf. He dismissed prior to the recording sessions his keyboardist, Eric Scortia, to achieve a sound more similar to that of Creedence Clearwater Revival. Omar wrote or cowrote, with Dick Wagner, ten of the album's songs. "Fire in the Jungle" is a tribute to Vietnam veterans. "Next Big Thing" is about Omar's experiences on Columbia Records. "She's a Woman" is a cover of the Beatles song. "Ding Dong Clock" and "Modern Man" contain elements of rockabilly.

== Critical reception ==
Professional ratings
Review scores
Source	Rating
All Music Guide to the Blues	3/5 stars
Calgary Herald	B+
The Encyclopedia of Popular Music	3/5 stars
The Grove Press Guide to the Blues on CD	3/5 stars
Lincoln Journal Star	A−
MusicHound Blues: The Essential Album Guide	3/5 stars
Ottawa Citizen	3/5 stars
The Penguin Guide to Blues Recordings	2.5/4 stars

The Toronto Star called the new songs "leaden and cynical", and noted that many touched on Omar's experience with a major label. The San Antonio Express-News deemed Monkey Land the band's best album and praised Omar's "barbed wire guitar and booming Howlin' Wolf voice". The Calgary Herald labeled it "down and dirty Texas blues-rock".

The Ottawa Citizen stated, "One thing never missing from Omar and the Howlers' interpretation of the blues is the humor that most other refried blues groups seem to miss." The Washington Post concluded, "Little here invites, let alone demands, repeated listening, and until Omar comes up with tunes that don't reveal his blues influences so readily, he might as well be howling at the proverbial moon." The Lincoln Journal Star said that Omar "has one of the most distinctive voices in rock".

== Track listing ==
No.	Title	Length
1.	"Monkey Land"
2.	"Tonight I Think of You"
3.	"Big Town Shakedown"
4.	"She's a Woman"
5.	"Fire in the Jungle"
6.	"Night Shadows"
7.	"Modern Man"
8.	"Loud Mouth Woman"
9.	"Dirty People"
10.	"Ding Dong Clock"
11.	"Next Big Thing"
