= Lavelle White =

American blues singer and songwriter

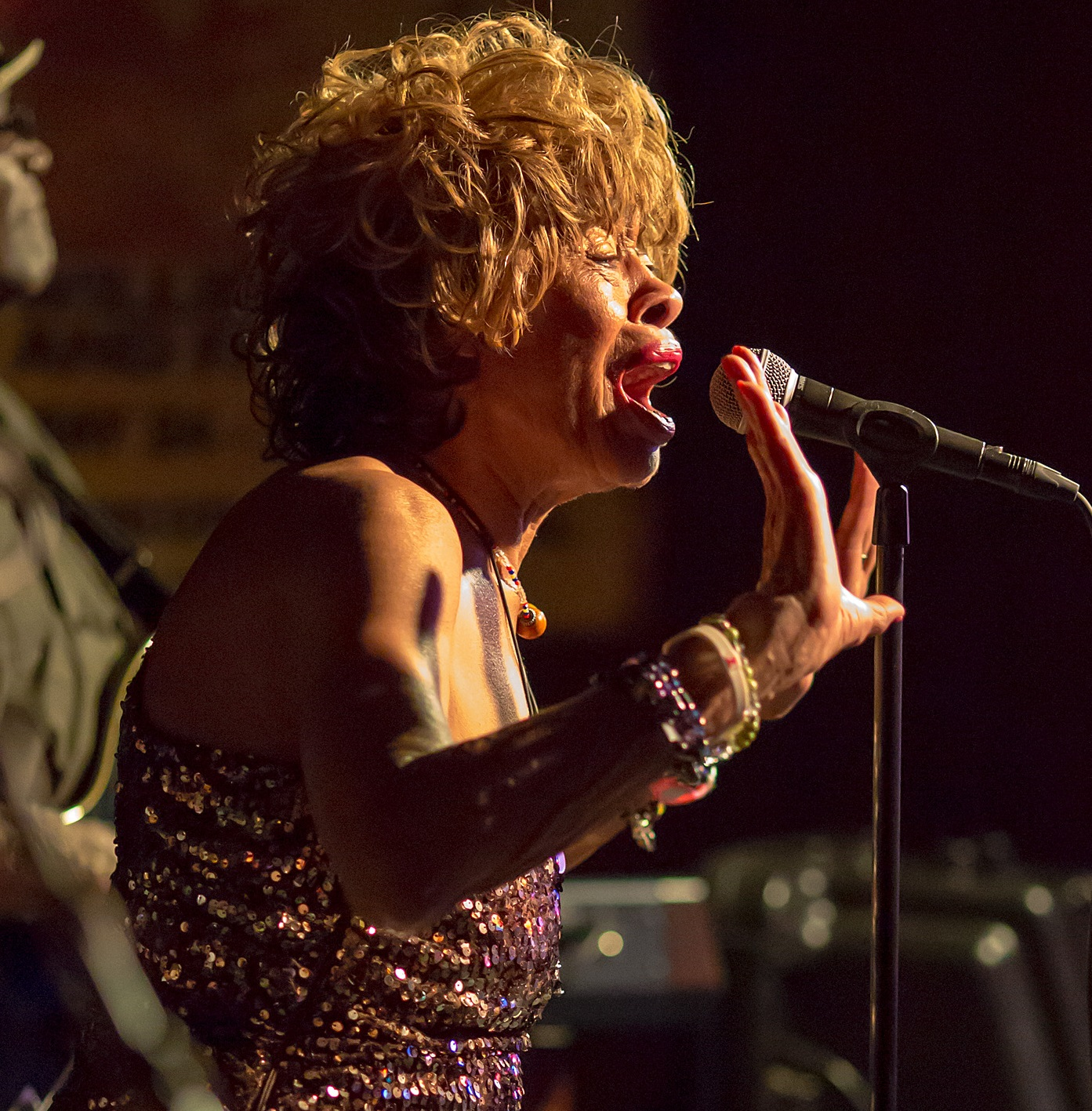
- White performing in 2014

Background information
- Also known as: Miss La-Vell; Lily Fields
- Born: Lillia Lavell White; July 3, 1929 (age 96); Amite City, Louisiana, United States
- Genres: Texas blues, soul blues, electric blues
- Occupation(s): Singer, songwriter
- Instrument: Vocals
- Years active: 1950s–present
- Labels: Various including Duke

Lillia Lavell "Lavelle" White (born July 3, 1929) is an American Texas blues and soul blues singer and songwriter. After performing most of her adult lifetime, White released three albums, the first of which was issued in 1994, when she was aged 65.

== Life and career ==
White was born in Amite City, Louisiana. Her parents were sharecroppers. She started to write poetry at the age of 12, which led her to songwriting, and singing gospel songs. White relocated to Houston, Texas, at the age of 15, and started to perform in that city's blues clubs with the guitarist Clarence Hollimon. Her break came when Johnny Copeland recommended her to Don Robey, the owner of the Duke and Peacock record labels. She was then billed as Miss La-Vell. White recorded fourteen tracks, releasing a number of singles for Duke, between 1958 and 1964. These included "If I Could Be with You", "Just Look at You Fool", "Stop These Teardrops", and "The Tide of Love". She wrote several of her songs and has been writing for most of her lifetime. White co-wrote Bobby Bland's "Lead Me On", which was a hit in 1960, though her contribution was credited to Deadric Malone, a pseudonym used by Robey. She appeared in local revues until the late 1960s.

White toured across the United States when her recording contract expired. In the 1960s she shared stages with many musicians, including Bland, Sam Cooke, Otis Redding, Junior Parker, Aretha Franklin and Jerry Butler. She moved to Chicago in 1978, where she performed in various clubs and worked with Junior Wells, Lonnie Brooks and Buddy Guy. She returned to Houston eight years later. White was later voted Houston's Blues Artist of the Year. She relocated again and became a regular performer in the Austin area, including a residency at Antone's.

Her debut album was not released until 1994, however, when Miss Lavelle was issued on the Antone's label. It was her first recording for almost 30 years. White appeared at the San Francisco Blues Festival in 1995. She has also performed at the Houston International Festival. Her second album, It Haven't Been Easy, was released in 1997. Both albums feature guitar work from her former performing colleague, Clarence Hollimon. The same year, White appeared with Delbert McClinton on the television program Austin City Limits. Her third album, Into the Mystic, was released in 2003.

She has been nominated several times for a Blues Music Award, and in 2006 was inducted into the Texas Music Hall of Fame. The same year her ensemble was voted the Best Blues Band in The Austin Chronicle Music Awards. White appeared at the Ponderosa Stomp music festival.

== Discography ==
=== Albums ===
Year	Title	Record label
1994	Miss Lavelle	Antone's
1997	It Haven't Been Easy	Texas Music Group
2003	Into the Mystic	Antone's

=== Compilation albums ===
Year	Title	Record label
1994	Can't Live Without It	Antone's
2003	Texas Soul Sisters	Dialtone

== See also ==
- List of Texas blues musicians
- List of soul-blues musicians
- List of electric blues musicians
- List of Austin City Limits performers
