= Old Enough =

Old Enough may refer to:

- Old Enough (film), a 1984 American comedy-drama coming-of-age film
- Old Enough!, a Japanese reality television show
- Old Enough (album), a 1982 album by Lou Ann Barton
- "Old Enough", a song by Nickelback, from the album The State
- "Old Enough", a song by the Raconteurs, from the album Consolers of the Lonely
