= Read My Lips (Lou Ann Barton album) =

- LP cover

Studio album by Lou Ann Barton
- Released: 1989
- Genre: Blues, rock and roll
- Label: Antone's Records and Tapes
- Producer: Paul Ray

Lou Ann Barton chronology
Forbidden Tones (1986)	Read My Lips (1989)	Dreams Come True (1990)

Read My Lips is an album by the American singer Lou Ann Barton, released in 1989. The Plain Dealer called the album a throwback to a time when "regional styles flourished, were celebrated and enriched popular music."

Barton's two earlier 1980s albums were already out of print by the time of Read My Lips' release. The album's title is a reference to George H. W. Bush's 1988 campaign promise.

== Production ==
A covers album, Read My Lips was recorded with several guest musicians, including saxophonist David "Fathead" Newman and members of the Fabulous Thunderbirds. The main players included guitarist Derek O' Brien, bassist Jon Blondell, and drummer George Rains. The album was produced by Paul Ray.

== Critical reception ==
Professional ratings
Review scores
Source	Rating
AllMusic	4.5/5 stars
The Encyclopedia of Popular Music	3/5 stars
The Penguin Guide to Blues Recordings	2/4 stars
The Rolling Stone Album Guide	4/5 stars

Spin thought that the album "captures the sound and spirit of a 50s Excello or Duke recording without sacrificing 80s technology." The Austin American-Statesman wrote that "'Shake Your Hips', in particular, is a masterful use of rock 'n' roll, gutter guitar licks bolstering a mean, low-down and dirty blues song about a dance undoubtably outlawed except in the darkest of clubs." The Daily Breeze opined that Read My Lips "sounds like just the kind of thing you'd want to hear blasting away in a Texas roadhouse—lowdown, sweat-drenched rhythm-and-blues."

The Toronto Star wrote: "The good thing about Barton, unlike so many blues-by-number advocates, is that it is hard to know which way she'll turn next. She takes a playful novelty piece like Slim Harpo's 'Te Ni Nee Ni Nu' and invests it with almost inappropriate urgency, while her cover of 'You'll Lose A Good Thing' is casually ironic instead of emotionally heated." The Chicago Tribune deemed the album "down and dirty Texas blues and boogie." The Tulsa World determined that Barton's "version of Wanda Jackson's 'Mean, Mean Man' is hard-driving, pouty rock 'n' roll, sounding like what might have happened if Betty Boop had sung lead with the Flamin' Groovies."

AllMusic wrote: "Wisely free of attempts to update or modernize her timeless Texas-style blues-rock, Read My Lips is a rockin' good time." The Rolling Stone Album Guide called the album "a set of scorching performances that remind us not of what she might have been, but what she is—a natural-born singer who's learned hard lessons by living them." The Penguin Guide to Blues Recordings argued that Barton's "métier is rock rather than blues."

== Track listing ==
No.	Title	Length
1.	"Sugar Coated Love"
2.	"You'll Lose a Good Thing"
3.	"Sexy Ways"
4.	"Shake a Hand"
5.	"Good Lover"
6.	"Mean Mean Man"
7.	"Shake Your Hips"
8.	"Te Ni Nee Ni Nu"
9.	"Can't Believe You Want to Leave"
10.	"You Can Have My Husband"
11.	"It's Raining"
12.	"Rocket in My Pocket"
13.	"I Wonder Why"
14.	"Let's Have a Party"
15.	"High Time We Went"
