= Angela Strehli =

American blues singer-songwriter

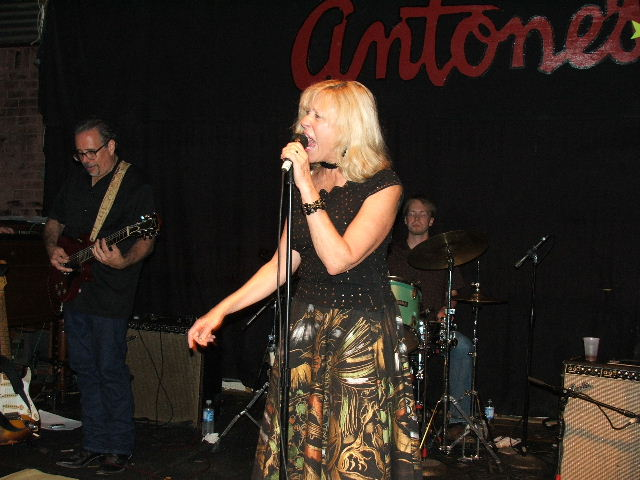
- Angela Strehli at Antone's 31st Anniversary, Austin, Texas, July 2006.

Background information
- Born: November 22, 1945 (age 80); Lubbock, Texas, U.S.
- Genres: Blues; Texas blues; electric blues
- Occupations: Musician; songwriter
- Instruments: Vocals; harmonica; bass guitar
- Years active: 1960s-present
- Labels: Antone's; Rounder Records; M.C.; House of Blues
- Website: www.aceofblues.com

Angela Strehli (born November 22, 1945) is an American electric blues singer and songwriter. She is also a Texas blues historian and impresario. Despite a sporadic recording career, Strehli spends time each year performing in Europe, the US and Canada.

== Biography ==
In the early 1960s, Strehli learned the harmonica and bass guitar before becoming a vocalist. In 1966 she visited Chicago, and attended concerts given by Howlin' Wolf, Muddy Waters and Buddy Guy. In her final university year, Strehli and Lewis Cowdrey formed the Fabulous Rockets. Strehli then sang as a backing vocalist for James Polk and the Brothers and assisted with Storm, which had been formed by Cowdrey and Jimmie Vaughan.

In 1972, she was a founding member of Southern Feeling, along with W. C. Clark and Denny Freeman. Three years later Strehli became the stage manager and sound technician at Antone's, a nightclub in Austin, Texas. By 1986, Strehli had recorded Stranger Blues (EP) which help launch Antone's own record label. Her debut album was Soul Shake (1987, Antone's Records), and she appeared on Dreams Come True, with Lou Ann Barton and Marcia Ball (1990). Her own effort Blonde and Blue (1993, Rounder Records) assisted in building the Austin, Texas blues scene, alongside nightclub owner Clifford Antone, Kim Wilson, Stevie Ray Vaughan and Jimmie Vaughan. In 1998, Strehli released Deja Blue, and Blue Highway followed in 2005.

Strehli has either recorded, toured or performed with Andy Santana, Elvin Bishop and Pinetop Perkins, and appeared at festivals including Notodden Blues Festival, Long Beach Blues Festival, Edmonton's Labatt Blues Festival and the San Francisco Blues Festival. In 2003, she recorded music for the tribute album, Shout, Sister, Shout: A Tribute to Sister Rosetta Tharpe.

Strehli continues to lead the four Blues Broads, with Tracy Nelson, Annie Sampson, and Dorothy Morrison, as of 2019. The Blues Broads are based in Marin County, California. Their live November 4, 2011, performance from the Throckmorton Theatre was released as a CD + DVD recording by Delta Groove Productions in 2012.

Angela Strehli moved to California after 1993. She has been based in Marin County, California, for many years. As of 2019, she and her husband Bob Brown have run Rancho Nicasio, an indoor/outdoor restaurant and music venue, in Nicasio, Marin County.

== Discography ==
- Soul Shake (1987, Antone's)
- Dreams Come True with Lou Ann Barton and Marcia Ball (1990, Antone's)
- Blonde & Blue (1993, Rounder)
- Deja Blue (1998, House of Blues)
- The Queen of Texas Blues (1998, House of Blues)
- Live from Rancho Nicasio (2001, self released)
- Blue Highway (2005, M.C. Records)
- The Blues Broads with Tracy Nelson, Annie Sampson and Dorothy Morrison (2012, Delta Groove Productions)
- Ace of Blues (2022, Antone's/New West)

== See also ==
- List of Texas blues musicians
- List of electric blues musicians
