= Omar Kent Dykes =

American blues guitarist and singer

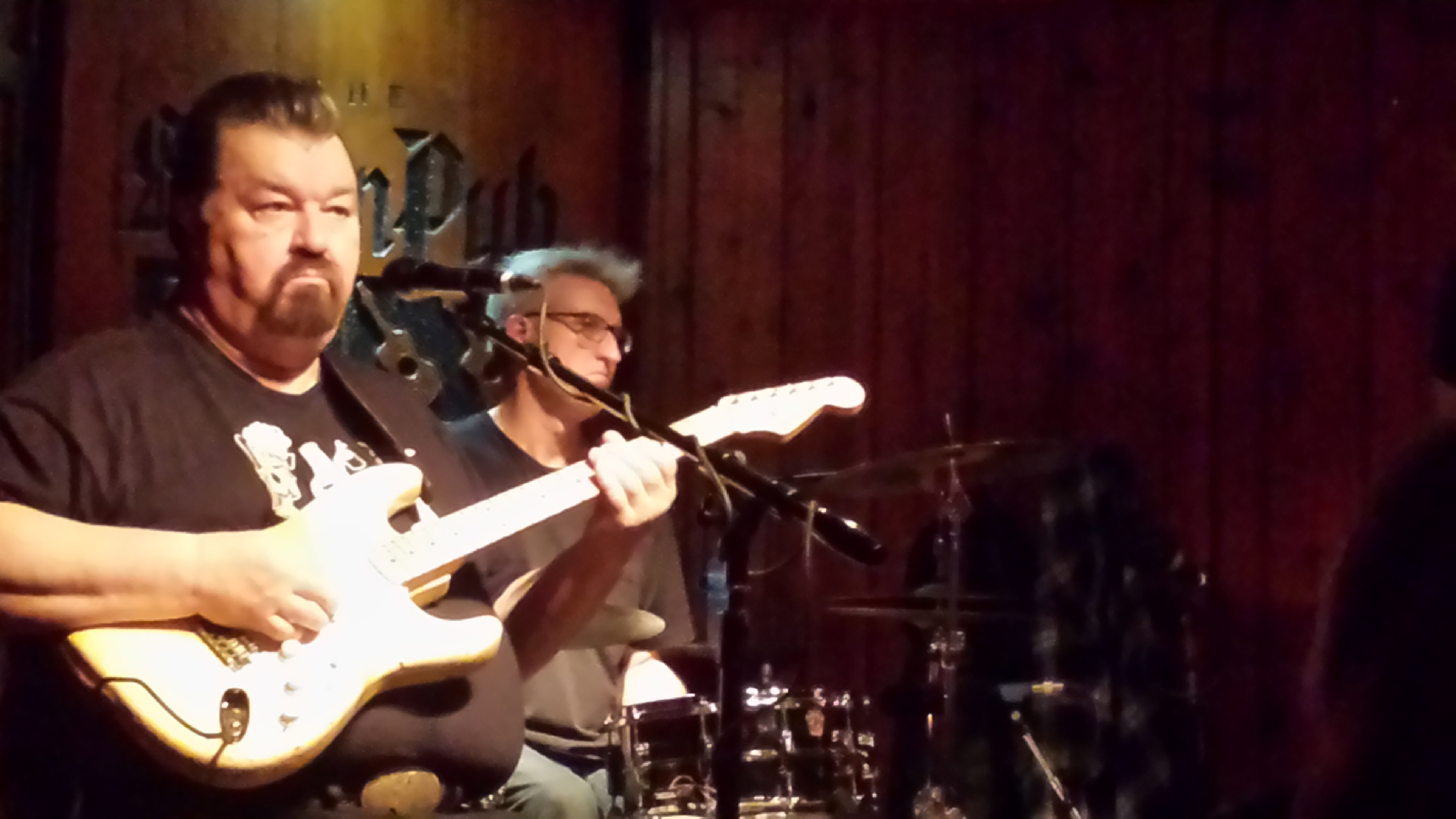
- Omar and the Howlers playing at the Saxon in Austin, Texas
- Born: Darryl Kent Dykes; January 24, 1950 (age 75); McComb, Mississippi, U.S.
- Education: McComb High School, Southwest Junior College, Summit, MS
- Occupation(s): Blues guitarist, songwriter and singer
- Years active: 1963–present
- Known for: Blues rock, traditional blues
- Notable work: Hard Times in the Land of Plenty in 1987 on Columbia Records
- Style: Blues
- Spouse: Elizabeth Ann Medrano
- Children: Jacob Henry Dykes

Omar Kent Dykes (born Darryl Kent Dykes, 1950) is an American blues guitarist songwriter, and singer, living in Austin, Texas. His parents, Henry and Chrystine Dykes, supported him in his career from the time Omar was a young boy.

He began leading bands as an adolescent in his birthplace of McComb, Mississippi.

In 1973 he formed the band, Omar & the Howlers. The band plays electric Texas blues, rock and roll and blues-rock. Dykes has also had a successful career as a solo artist, and regularly toured 49 states in the United States and 23 countries.

Among his 36 albums are Blues Bag from 1991, and Muddy Springs Road from 1994.

Awards include the Netherlands Edison Award, Summit Street Mississippi Blues Trail Marker, Lifetime Achievement Award from Austin Music People, Outstanding Achievements in the Musical Arts from the City of McComb, Mississippi, Lifetime Career Award Bluebird Reviews, and a Texas Music Hall of Fame inductee.

Dykes was afflicted in 2017 with a skin illness that wasted away the flesh of his arms, and he lost the ability to perform in public. In 2020 he published a memoir, OMAR DYKES: The Life and Times of a Poor and Almost Famous Bluesman.

Dykes also wrote two books about his songwriting and recording career entitled Ballad of Old Leather Butt: A Collection of Songs Unsung, and Mississippi Hoo Doo Man: A Collection of Recorded Songs from Big Leg Beat to Muddy Springs Road.

== Discography ==
- Big Leg Beat (1980, Amazing Records, Big Guitar)
- I Told You So (1984, Austin Records, Big Guitar)
- Hard Times in the Land of Plenty (1987, Columbia)
- Wall of Pride (1988, Columbia)
- Monkey Land (1990, Antones Records)
- Blues Bag (1991, Provogue, Big Guitar)
- Live at Paradiso (1992, Provogue, Big Guitar)
- Courts of Lulu (1993, Provogue, Big Guitar)
- Muddy Springs Road (1995, Provogue, Big Guitar)
- World Wide Open (1996, Provogue, Big Guitar)
- Southern Style (1997, Provogue, Big Guitar)
- Swing Land (1999, Provogue, Big Guitar)
- Live at the Opera House: Austin, Texas - August 30, 1987 (2000, Provogue, Big Guitar)
- The Screamin' Cat (2000, Provogue, Big Guitar)
- Big Delta (2002, Provogue, Big Guitar)
- Boogie Man (2004, Ruf, Big Guitar)
- Bamboozled: Live in Germany (2006, Ruf, Big Guitar)
- On The Jimmy Reed Highway (2007, Ruf) (with Jimmie Vaughan, Lou Ann Barton and others.)
- Big Town Playboy (2009, Ruf, Big Guitar)
- Essential Collection (2012, Ruf, Big Guitar) 2CD
- I'm Gone (2012, Big Guitar)
- Too Much is Not Enough (2012, Big Guitar)
- Running With the Wolf (2013, Provogue)
- "Too Raw For Radio" (2013, Big Guitar)
- "The Kitchen Sink" (2015, Big Guitar)
- "Zoltar's Walk" (2017, Big Guitar)
- Classic Live Performances 1990s vol. 1 (2023, Big Guitar)
- Classic Live Performances 1990s vol. 2 (2023, Big Guitar)
- Classic Live Performances 1990s vol. 3 (2023, Big Guitar)
- Classic Live Performances 1990s vol. 4 (2023, Big Guitar)
- "What's Buggin' You?" (2023, Big Guitar)
- "Magic Man" (MIG,2023)
- "Uneasy Listening" (2024, Big Guitar)
- "Aggressive Country" (2024, Big Guitar)
- "Rhythm and Western" (2024, Big Guitar)
