= Hard Times in the Land of Plenty =

Studio album by Omar & the Howlers
- Released: 1987
- Genres: Blues rock, Southern rock, heartland rock
- Label: Columbia
- Producer: Richard Mullen

Omar & the Howlers chronology
| I Told You So (1984) | Hard Times in the Land of Plenty (1987) | Wall of Pride (1988) |

Hard Times in the Land of Plenty is an album by the American band Omar & the Howlers, released in 1987. It was their first album for major label. The title track peaked at No. 19 on Billboard's Mainstream Rock chart and appeared in the film Like Father Like Son. The band supported the album with a North American tour. Hard Times in the Land of Plenty was sometimes included with "heartland rock" albums of the 1980s that addressed worsening economic conditions in the United States.

== Production ==
The album was produced by Richard Mullen. It was recorded by the band as a power trio, with the Howlers adding a keyboardist prior to touring. Unlike many blues rock players of the time, frontman Omar Dykes preferred power chords over one-note guitar solos. His primary vocal influence was Howlin' Wolf. The title track bemoans the rise of poverty in the United States during the 1980s.

== Critical reception ==
Professional ratings
Review scores
| Source | Rating |
|---|---|
| AllMusic | 4.5/5 stars |
| MusicHound Blues: The Essential Album Guide | 4/5 stars |
| The Windsor Star | B− |

The Houston Chronicle praised Omar's "often fanciful and reverberating guitar chops and his always sly and dangerous vocals, which alternate between a smokey hoarseness and a Howlin' Wolf-styled lowdown growl." The Sun-Sentinel concluded that, "despite the rather monotonous stylings of the 10 original songs, Omar's silty, root-bound rasp overcomes the flaws and makes this one of the better party albums to appear in awhile." The Vancouver Sun noted that "they all look like bikers, and sound like it as well, rolling out savage roadhouse R&B and swamp boogie that'll be roarin' from car stereos for years to come."

The Boston Globe opined that the band "are true songwriters, not just boogie merchants along the lines of Southern rock oldsters like Molly Hatchet or Wet Willie." The Toronto Star deemed the album "non-nonsense, thoughtful, intelligent yet fiery rock 'n' roll." The Windsor Star said that "Omar's voice could prepare car bodies for the primer coat, and the shuffle never quits." USA Today listed Hard Times in the Land of Plenty among the best pop albums of 1987.

AllMusic called the album "a rough and tumble collection that is driven as much by fine original songwriting as it is by the band's edgy sound."

== Track listing ==
| No. | Title | Length |
|---|---|---|
| 1. | "Hard Times in the Land of Plenty" | 3:54 |
| 2. | "Dancing in the Canebrake" | 4:34 |
| 3. | "Border Girl" | 3:36 |
| 4. | "Mississippi Hoo Doo Man" | 3:54 |
| 5. | "Don't Rock Me the Wrong Way" | 3:30 |
| 6. | "Same Old Grind" | 2:28 |
| 7. | "Don't You Know" | 3:46 |
| 8. | "You Ain't Foolin' Nobody" | 2:30 |
| 9. | "Shadow Man" | 3:43 |
| 10. | "Lee Anne" | 5:11 |
