= C. J. Chenier =

American zydeco musician, singer and songwriter

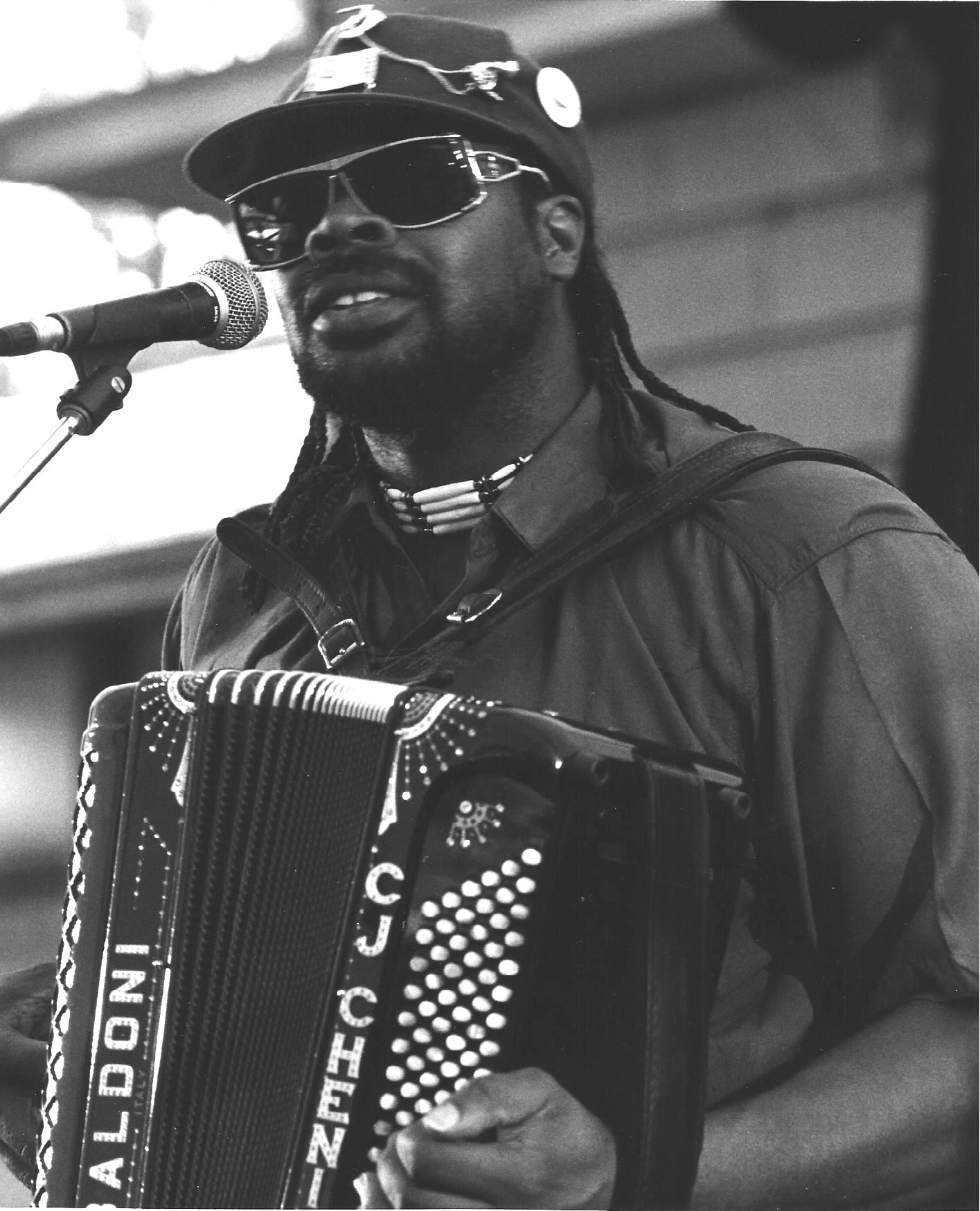
- Chenier performing in the Ross Bandstand in Princes Street Gardens, Edinburgh, Scotland in 1997

Background information
- Born: September 28, 1957 (age 68); Port Arthur, Texas, U.S.
- Genres: Zydeco
- Occupations: Musician, songwriter
- Instruments: Vocals, accordion, saxophone
- Years active: 1978–present
- Labels: Slash; Arhoolie; Alligator; World Village; Munck Music
- Website: officialcjchenier.com

C. J. Chenier (born Clayton Joseph Thompson, September 28, 1957) is an American zydeco musician. He is the son of zydeco musician Clifton Chenier. In 1987, Chenier followed in his father's footsteps and led his father's band as an accordion performer and singer of zydeco, a blend of cajun and creole music. With five previous albums to his credit, by 1994, Chenier began to record for Chicago-based Alligator Records.

== Career ==
Chenier grew up in the 1960s, in the housing projects of his birthplace of Port Arthur, Texas. He is the son of the Grammy Award-winning "King of Zydeco", Clifton Chenier. There, Chenier was aware of, but not exposed to, his father's music as a young child, and had not heard the word zydeco until later in his youth. Instead, Chenier developed tastes in the 1970s soul, funk and jazz music of James Brown, Funkadelic, John Coltrane and Miles Davis.

Upon first listening to his father's music, Chenier thought all the songs sounded the same. But he eventually began to appreciate and master the zydeco style, as he later joined and then took over his father's band and career. The first instrument Chenier learned to play was the saxophone. As a teenager in the early 1970s, he played in black Top 40 bands in Port Arthur. By the mid-1970s, Chenier went to college to study music.

In 1978, his father invited Chenier to play his saxophone with the Red Hot Louisiana Band, whose members also included his uncle, Cleveland Chenier, on washboard. By 1985, as his father was growing ill from diabetes, he invited Chenier to start playing the accordion in a larger role with the band, and to open the shows.

In 1987, the year his father died, Chenier continued his own musical career where his father left off. He has since played such venues as the New Orleans Jazz & Heritage Festival, San Diego's Street Scene and Milwaukee's Summerfest.

Paul Simon first heard Chenier in 1990, and featured him on the album The Rhythm of the Saints, and that year's 'Born At The Right Time' tour. In 1992, Chenier played accordion on "Cajun Song", a track on the Gin Blossoms' album, New Miserable Experience.

1992 saw Chenier featured with the Red Hot Louisiana Band on the PBS music television program Austin City Limits.

By October 1994, Chenier was signed by Alligator. His debut release there was Too Much Fun, named the next year as best zydeco album of 1995 by Living Blues magazine. In 1995, Chenier gained his widest audience to date with television appearances on the Jon Stewart Show and CNN. His 1996 appearance at the New Orleans Jazz & Heritage Festival was featured in a segment by the VH1 cable music television network, as well as by Entertainment Weekly.

Chenier and the band also appeared that year at the Austin, Texas, 1996 SxSW Music Conference, a special event for Alligator Records' 25th anniversary. Chenier won the 1997 Living Blues' Critics' Poll Award and also an AFIM Indie Award for best zydeco album, for his next release, The Big Squeeze. In 2001, Chenier played in front of 60,000 fans at the Chicago Blues Festival. In 2001, his recording Step It Up! was released, recorded at Dockside Studios in Maurice, Louisiana.

== Chenier paternity dispute ==
Chenier's attempt to gain a portion of Clifton Chenier's estate failed in Louisiana courts in 2006, due to lack of proof that he is his biological son. In 2014, Chenier appeared on stage at the 56th Annual Grammy Awards to accept a Lifetime Achievement Award on behalf of Clifton, accompanied by Clifton's nephew, Mike Vital. Later that year, members of Clifton's family filed a lawsuit claiming that C.J., born Clayton Joseph Thompson, is not the biological son of Clifton and was illegally profiting from the Chenier name. They claim the late zydeco legend was physically unable to have children. C.J. claims that when he was in his twenties, he was claimed by Clifton as his son, after which they began to collaborate musically.

== Discography ==
=== C. J. Chenier & The Red Hot Louisiana Band ===
- Hot Rod (Slash Records), 1990
- My Baby Don't Wear No Shoes (Arhoolie Records), 1992
- Too Much Fun (Alligator Records), 1995
- The Big Squeeze (Alligator Records), 1996
- Step It Up! (Alligator Records), 2001

=== C. J. Chenier ===
- I Ain't No Playboy (Slash Records), 1992
- The Desperate Kingdom Of Love (World Village Records), 2006
- Can't Sit Down (World Village Records), 2011

=== Limited editions ===
- Live at 2012 New Orleans Jazz & Heritage Festival (Munck Music), 2012
- Live at 2013 New Orleans Jazz & Heritage Festival (Munck Music), 2013
- Live at 2014 New Orleans Jazz & Heritage Festival (Munck Music), 2014
- Live at 2015 New Orleans Jazz & Heritage Festival (Munck Music), 2015
- Live at 2016 New Orleans Jazz & Heritage Festival (Munck Music), 2016
- Live at 2017 New Orleans Jazz & Heritage Festival (Munck Music), 2017
- Live at 2018 New Orleans Jazz & Heritage Festival (Munck Music), 2018
- Live at 2019 New Orleans Jazz & Heritage Festival (Munck Music), 2019

== See also ==
- List of Austin City Limits performers
