= Hot Rod (album) =

Studio album by C.J. Chenier
- Released: 1990
- Genre: Zydeco
- Label: Slash
- Producer: Chris Strachwitz, C.J. Chenier

C.J. Chenier chronology
My Baby Don't Wear No Shoes (1988)	Hot Rod (1990)	I Ain't No Playboy (1992)

Hot Rod is an album by the American musician C.J. Chenier, released in 1990. He is credited with the Red Hot Louisiana Band. Although Chenier grew up listening primarily to R&B, he considered Hot Rod to be a traditional zydeco album.

Chenier supported the album by playing shows with, among others, Buckwheat Zydeco and Terrance Simien.

== Production ==
Recorded in less than two weeks, the album was produced by Chris Strachwitz and Chenier. The majority of the band had played with Chenier's father, Clifton Chenier. "You're Still the King to Me" is a tribute to Clifton.

"Hot Rod", written by Clifton, was C.J.'s favorite zydeco song as a child. "Jole Blon" is a cover of the Cajun waltz. Chenier wrote Hot Rod's remaining 10 songs, including the ballad "It's a Shame".

== Critical reception ==
Professional ratings
Review scores
Source	Rating
AllMusic	4.5/5 stars
Calgary Herald	B+
The Encyclopedia of Popular Music	3/5 stars
MusicHound World: The Essential Album Guide	4/5 stars
Orlando Sentinel	5/5 stars
The Republican	3/5 stars

The Calgary Herald noted that "it's just Chenier's gritty accordion and fellow musicians delivering a heaping helping of blues, rock and country via a spicy zydeco mixture." The Washington Post considered "Harmonica Zydeco" to be the album's best original composition, and labeled the album "an infectious celebration of his family roots." The Houston Chronicle called the band "still the tightest rhythm section in zydeco, equally capable of holding down a mesmerizing blues groove and picking up a triangle and extra rubboard to funkify an ancient Acadian reel."

The Orlando Sentinel opined that "this is genuine, 100 percent zydeco although the genre's soul and blues components are more prominent in C.J.'s music than in his father's... C.J.'s accordion sometimes plays sax-style licks or mimics a Hammond organ." USA Today thought that Chenier "proudly carries the torch with plenty of rock ... folk and R&B squeezed into the squeezebox-driven grooves." The Dallas Morning News determined that Chenier's "muscular when he needs to be but doesn't insist, as Buckwheat sometimes does, on forcing marriages between zydeco and other brands of music."

AllMusic wrote that "the majority of the songs are jumping little pieces, with a mishmash of zydeco, boogaloo, and R&B all rolled into one."

== Track listing ==
No.	Title	Length
1.	"I Feel Alright"
2.	"Got My Eyes on You"
3.	"It's a Shame"
4.	"Zydeco Express"
5.	"You're Still the King to Me"
6.	"Before It's Too Late"
7.	"Harmonica Zydeco"
8.	"Your Time to Cry"
9.	"Hot Rod"
10.	"Old Fashioned Party"
11.	"Jole Blon"
12.	"Just the Beginning"
