= Too Much Fun (album) =

Studio album by C. J. Chenier
- Released: 1995
- Studio: Ardent
- Genre: Zydeco
- Label: Alligator
- Producer: C. J. Chenier, Bruce Iglauer

C. J. Chenier chronology
I Ain't No Playboy (1992)	Too Much Fun (1995)	The Big Squeeze (1996)

Too Much Fun is an album by the American musician C. J. Chenier, released in 1995. He is credited with his backing band, the Red Hot Louisiana Band. It was his first album for Alligator Records. Chenier supported it with a North American tour. The first single was "Man Smart, Woman Smarter".

== Production ==
The album was produced by Chenier and Bruce Iglauer. It was recorded over a week, the longest amount of time that Chenier had spent working on an album; his main concern was ensuring that all the songs sounded different, rather than employing the same zydeco tempo. Chenier played alto saxophone as well as accordion. The Memphis Horns and Vasti Jackson contributed to the album. "Zydeco Cha Cha", "Louisiana Two Step", and "You Used to Call Me" were written by Chenier's father, Clifton. "Down Home Blues" is a cover of the song made famous by Z. Z. Hill.

== Critical reception ==
Professional ratings
Review scores
Source	Rating
AllMusic	3.5/5 stars
The Associated Press	3.5/4 stars
Blade-Citizen	B+
MusicHound Folk: The Essential Album Guide	3.5/5 stars
The Penguin Guide to Blues Recordings	3/4 stars

The Washington Post wrote that the album is "an arousing example of how zydeco's polyrhythms can benefit from the ballad conventions and horn charts of Memphis soul." The Telegram & Gazette said that "Chenier's singing is as impressive as the band's playing, with his voice carrying the rich resonance of a pure bluesman." The Chicago Tribune concluded that "much of the music comes off as zydeco-peppered blues rather than freshly- seasoned zydeco."

The Record determined that "Chenier's flamboyant accordion-playing is complemented by his smooth, soulful baritone voice and a superb backing band." The Journal & Courier opined that the "reigning crown prince of zydeco delivers the instant party record of the season." The Associated Press stated that Too Much Fun "works better than most studio zydeco albums."

AllMusic noted that "it would be unthinkable in the zydeco tradition to have too much fun without dancing being on the agenda, so dance tunes rule the record."

== Track listing ==
No.	Title	Length
1.	"Man Smart, Woman Smarter"
2.	"Bad Luck"
3.	"Richest Man"
4.	"Too Much Fun"
5.	"Give Me Some of That"
6.	"Louisiana Down Home Blues"
7.	"Zydeco Cha Cha"
8.	"Lost in the Shuffle"
9.	"Got You on My Mind"
10.	"Squeaky Wheel"
11.	"I'm Not Guilty"
12.	"You Used to Call Me"
13.	"Louisiana Two Step"
