= Omar & the Howlers =

American blues and rock band

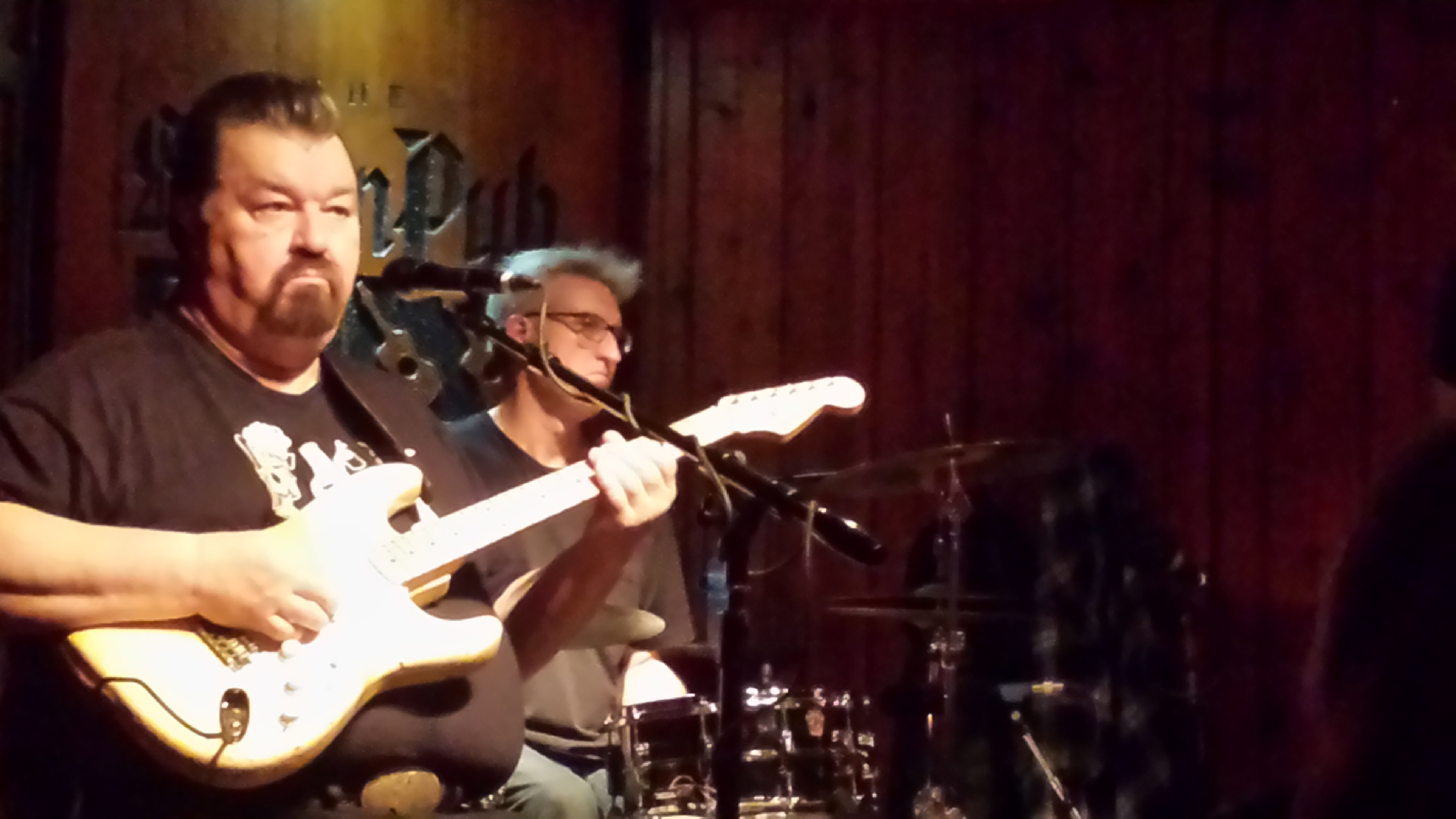
- Omar and the Howlers performing in Austin, Texas

Background information
- Origin: Austin, Texas, United States
- Genres: Blues rock; electric blues; jump blues; Texas blues
- Years active: 1973–present
- Labels: Columbia Records, Provogue, Big Guitar Music, Antone's, Watermelon
- Members: Omar Kent Dykes, Bruce Jones, Wes Starr
- Website: http://www.omarandthehowlers.com

Omar & the Howlers is a Texas-based blues and rock band which was originally formed in Hattiesburg, Mississippi in 1973. Three years later, they relocated to Austin, Texas. The band has regularly toured European countries. Led by singer/guitarist Omar Dykes, they are best known for the 1987 album Hard Times in the Land of Plenty, which sold over half a million copies and whose title song was a top 20 hit in America.

== Early years ==
Omar Kent Dykes grew up in McComb, Mississippi, began playing the guitar at age 12 and started his first band at 13. In his 20s, he gathered a group of musicians who started calling themselves 'the Howlers'. They specialized in frat parties and were a party band, playing music that included both "R&B, R&R and even the occasional polka and western swing tune". Dykes has said he remembers these days fondly. It was around this time that he started calling himself Omar and developed his penchant for the blues.

In 1976, the Howlers relocated to Austin, Texas, at the time sporting a bustling music scene, home to such up-and-coming artists as Stevie Ray Vaughan and Eric Johnson. After a year of gigging in Austin, the rest of the band quit, feeling that they were not cut out to play music full-time. As they headed back to Mississippi, Dykes stayed and kept the name. He worked out a new lineup, and recorded the debut album Big Leg Beat for Amazing Records in 1980, just after fellow Austin band The Fabulous Thunderbirds. The record was a local hit and was followed by I Told You So.

== Success ==
It was not until 1987, however, when Dykes signed a recording contract with Columbia, that the band would succeed. That year saw the release of Hard Times in the Land of Plenty, which went on to sell over 500,000 copies. The band now consisted of Dykes singing and playing guitar, Bruce Jones on bass, and Wes Starr on drums. Dykes and this rhythm section have been playing together off and on for over 30 years.

Since then, Omar And The Howlers has released more than twenty-five albums on Amazing, Austin, Columbia, Antone's, Bullseye Blues, Watermelon, Black Top, Blind Pig, Provogue, Ruf Records, and their current record label, Big Guitar Music.

== Band members ==
- Omar Dykes - vocals, guitar
- Bruce Jones - bass
- Gene Brandon - drums (died: January 8, 2014)
- Eric "Scorch" Scortia - Hammond B-3 organ, piano, synthesizers
- Stephen Bruton - guitar (died: May 9, 2009)
- Paul Junior - bass
- Steve Kilmer - drums
- Gary Primich - harmonica (died: September 23, 2007)
- Nick Connolly - organ
- Wes Starr - drums
- Barry Bihm - bass
- Kevin Hall - Drums
- Mike Buck - drums
- Kaz Kazanoff - tenor saxophone
- Richard Price - tenor saxophone and percussion (died: April 7, 2020)
- Jason Crisp - bass
- Ronnie James - bass
- Barry "Frosty" Smith - drums (died: April 12, 2017)
- Jon Hahn - drums
- Fred Tripp - drums

== Discography ==
Albums

- Big Leg Beat (1980)
- I Told You So (1984)
- Hard Times in the Land of Plenty (1987)
- Wall of Pride (1988)
- Monkey Land (1990)
- Blues Bag - [Omar Dykes] (1991)
- Live at Paradiso (1992)
- Courts of Lulu (1993)
- Muddy Springs Road (1995)
- World Wide Open (1996)
- Southern Style (1997)
- Swingland (1998)
- Live at the Opera House: Austin, Texas - August 30, 1987 (2000)
- The Screamin' Cat (2000)
- Big Delta (2002)
- Boogie Man (2004)
- Bamboozled: Live in Germany (2006)
- On The Jimmy Reed Highway - [Omar Kent Dykes and Jimmie Vaughan] (2007)
- Chapel Hill - [Nalle, Omar & Magic Slim] (2008)
- Big Town Playboy - [Omar Kent Dykes featuring Jimmie Vaughan and Friends] (2009)
- Essential Collection (2012) 2CD compilation
- I'm Gone (2012)
- Too Much is Not Enough - [Omar & The Howlers featuring Gary Primich] (2012)
- Just a Little Bit More... - [Gary Primich with Omar Dykes] (2012)
- Runnin' With the Wolf - [Omar Dykes] (2013)
- Too Raw for Radio [previously unreleased recordings from 1981] (2014)
- The Kitchen Sink (2015)
- Zoltar's Walk (2017)
- What's Buggin' You (2023)

Singles

Year	Song	US Rock	Album
1980	"Big Brown Shoes"	—	Big Leg Beat
1984	"Border Girl"	—	I Told You So
1987	"Hard Times In The Land Of Plenty"	19	Hard Times In; The Land Of Plenty
1987	"Dancing In The Canebrake"	—	Hard Times In; The Land Of Plenty
1988	"Rattlesnake Shake"	36	Wall Of Pride
1992	"Born On The Bayou"	—	Live At Paradiso
2000	"Girl's Got Rhythm "	—	The Screamin' Cat
