= Old Enough (album) =

Studio album by Lou Ann Barton
- Released: 1982
- Studio: Muscle Shoals
- Genre: Blues, pop, blues rock, R&B
- Label: Asylum
- Producer: Glenn Frey, Jerry Wexler

Lou Ann Barton chronology
Austin Festival (1979)	Old Enough (1982)	Forbidden Tones (1986)

Old Enough is an album by the American musician Lou Ann Barton, released in 1982. It was a commercial disappointment that resulted in personal and music business problems for Barton. The album was reissued in 1993 and in 2007.

== Production ==
The album was produced by Glenn Frey and Jerry Wexler. It was Frey's first time producing another musician's work. Old Enough was recorded at Muscle Shoals Sound Studio, where Barton was backed by the Muscle Shoals Rhythm Section. Jimmie Vaughan played guitar on the album. "It's Raining" was written by Allen Toussaint. "Finger Poppin' Time" is a cover of the Hank Ballard song; "Brand New Lover" is a cover of the Marshall Crenshaw song. "The Sudden Stop" is a cover of the song made famous by Percy Sledge.

== Critical reception ==
Professional ratings
Review scores
Source	Rating
AllMusic	4/5 stars
Robert Christgau	C+
MusicHound Blues: The Essential Album Guide	4/5 stars
Rolling Stone	4/5 stars

The New York Times called the album "the freshest, most emotionally compelling pop debut in the last year," stating that "it's difficult to make gritty, soulful albums these days; transistorized recording equipment and advanced computer technology get in the way... But Mr. Wexler and Mr. Frey have been able to get a band sound out of their Muscle Shoals musicians that's full, rich and centered, a sound with a bluesy edge." The Globe and Mail noted the "pure rhythm and blues." The Washington Post wrote that "Barton's style has a smoky nasality appropriate for a blues vocalist, but there's a gutsy quality often lacking in female blues covers." Robert Christgau panned Barton's "tractability," opining that she adopted different personas for her producers.

AllMusic deemed the album "a solid piece of soulful Texas-style blues-rock."

== Track listing ==
No.	Title	Length
1.	"I'm Old Enough"
2.	"Brand New Lover"
3.	"It's Raining"
4.	"It Ain't Right"
5.	"Finger Poppin' Time"
6.	"Stop These Teardrops"
7.	"The Sudden Stop"
8.	"The Doodle Song"
9.	"Maybe"
10.	"Every Day of the Week"
