= Lou Ann Barton =

American blues singer (born 1954)

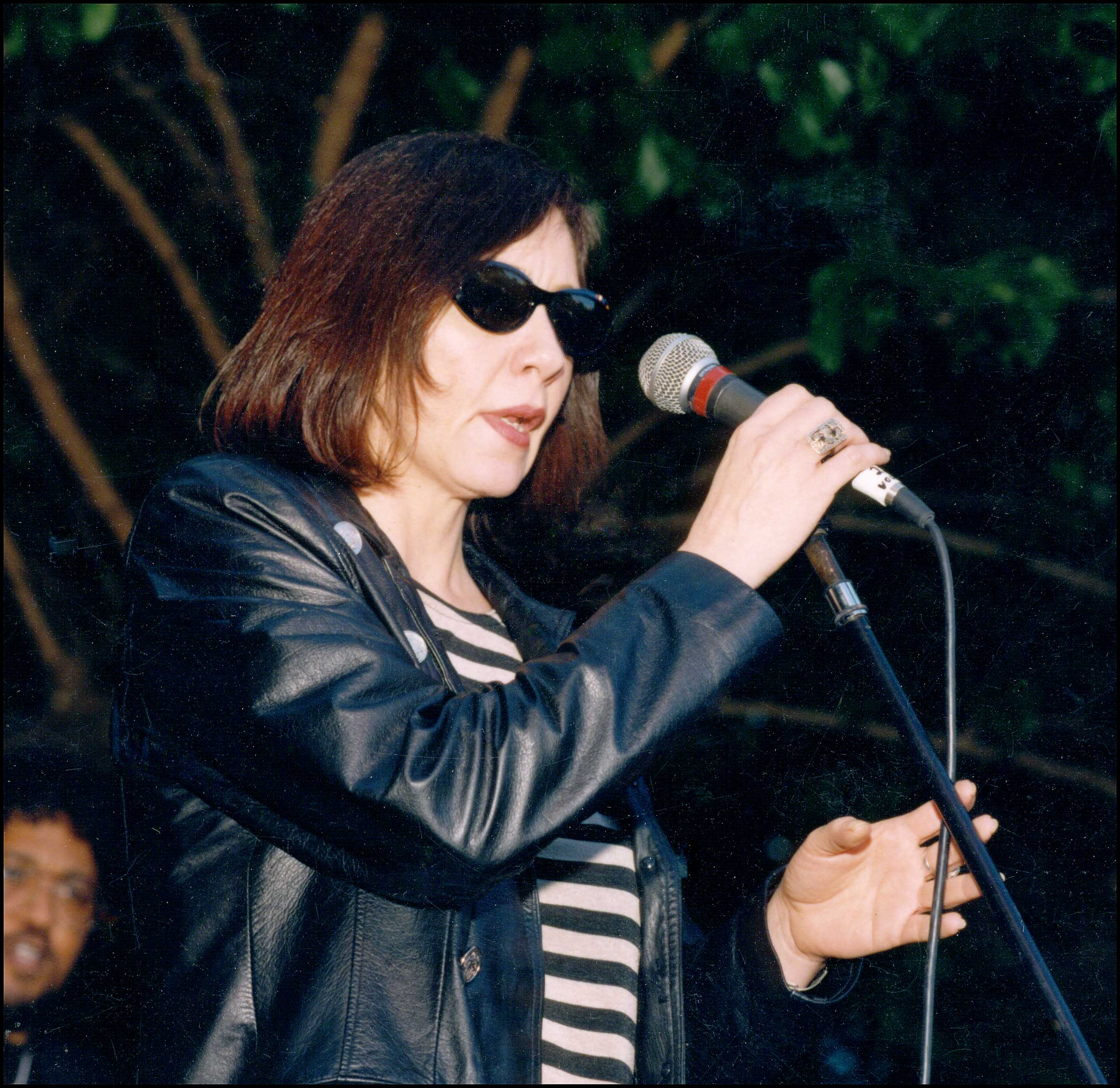
- Lou Ann Barton performing in 2006

Background information
- Born: February 17, 1954 (age 71); Fort Worth, Texas, United States
- Genres: Blues, Jump blues
- Occupations: Musician, songwriter, record producer
- Instrument: Vocalist
- Years active: 1970–present
- Labels: Asylum Records, Spindletop Records, Antone's Records

Lou Ann Barton (born February 17, 1954) is an American blues singer based in Austin, Texas since the 1970s. AllMusic noted that "The grace, poise, and confidence she projects on-stage is part of a long tradition for women blues singers".

== Biography ==
In late September 1977 Barton joined a new Austin blues group, Triple Threat Revue, with Stevie Ray Vaughan and W. C. Clark. It was renamed Double Trouble when Clark left in May 1978, and Barton continued with Double Trouble until November 1979. In the early 1980s, she did a stint with the jump blues band Roomful of Blues. It was there that she was spotted by the record producer Jerry Wexler.

She recorded the album Old Enough for Asylum Records in 1982, a well-received recording that was co-produced by Jerry Wexler and Glenn Frey. Despite positive reviews, Old Enough did not sell well, and her tenure with Asylum Records was a short one. Barton's Forbidden Tones, a pop-oriented EP slated as her Asylum follow-up, was released by Spindletop Records in 1986. It also failed to find a wide audience.

Her next release was the 1989 album Read My Lips for the Austin-based Antone's Records, a return to her blues roots that featured versions of songs made famous by Slim Harpo, Hank Ballard and Wanda Jackson, among others. Barton later collaborated with singers Marcia Ball and Angela Strehli on the release Dreams Come True (1990).

In 1989, Barton made an appearance on Austin City Limits with the W. C. Clark Blues Revue. The show was taped in celebration of Clark's 50th birthday. Other artists included Stevie Ray Vaughan, Jimmie Vaughan, and Kim Wilson of The Fabulous Thunderbirds.

In 2001, she again appeared on Austin City Limits, as a guest of Double Trouble. In 2006, she was a featured act at the Austin City Limits Music Festival. As of 2010, she was touring with Jimmie Vaughan and the Tilt-a-Whirl Band. Through 2018 Barton continued to perform in Austin, and elsewhere, sometimes "[b]acked by Derek O'Brien, Denny Freeman, Scott Nelson, & Jay Moeller", sometimes with Sue Foley.

== Discography ==
- 1979 Austin Festival with Stevie Ray Vaughan
- 1982 Old Enough (Asylum Records)
- 1986 Forbidden Tones (Spindletop Records)
- 1989 Read My Lips (Antone's Records)
- 1990 Dreams Come True with Marcia Ball and Angela Strehli (Antone's)
- 1998 Sugar Coated Love with Rockola and Stevie Ray Vaughan (M.I.L. Multimedia)
- 1999 Thunderbroad with Rockola and Stevie Ray Vaughan (Blues Factory)
- 2002 Someday (Catfish)
- 2007 On The Jimmy Reed Highway with Omar Kent Dykes and Jimmie Vaughan (Ruf Records)
- 2010 Jimmie Vaughan Plays Blues, Ballads, & Favorites with Jimmie Vaughan (Proper Records; Shout! Factory)
- 2011 Jimmie Vaughan Plays More Blues, Ballads & Favorites with Jimmie Vaughan (Proper; Shout! Factory)
- 2014 The Best! (Rockbeat Records)
