= Antone's Records =

American record label

- Parent company: Texas Music Group
- Founded: 1987
- Founder: Clifford Antone
- Defunct: 2006
- Distributor: Alternative Distribution Alliance
- Genre: Blues
- Country of origin: U.S.
- Location: Austin, Texas

Antone's was an American record label based in Austin, Texas.

== History ==
Antone's Records & Tapes was founded by Clifford Antone (October 27, 1949 – May 22, 2006) in 1987. It specialized in blues music, particularly the blues artists who performed at his blues nightclub Antone's, which opened on July 15, 1975, in Austin, Texas. In 1987, Antone also opened a record store named Antone's Record Shop in Austin, Texas. In 1993, the record label's name was simplified to Antone's Records. Antone's was awarded best local record label by The Austin Chronicle readers in 1993.

Texas Clef Entertainment Group, an affiliate of Antone's Records, acquired the assets of the defunct Watermelon Records label.

After Clifford Antone's death in 2006, the record label filed for bankruptcy. Masters of Antone's and Watermelon recordings went to New West Records as part of the Texas Music Group.

== Artists ==
Here is a partial list of artists who have released recordings on the Antone's label.

- Marcia Ball, Angela Strehli, and Lou Ann Barton
- Lou Ann Barton
- Zuzu Bollin
- Doyle Bramhall
- James Cotton
- Lewis Cowdrey
- Ronnie Earl
- Sue Foley
- Barry Goldberg
- Steve James
- Candye Kane
- Lazy Lester
- Barbara Lynn
- Pete Mayes
- Teddy Morgan
- Johnny Nicholas
- Omar & the Howlers
- Pinetop Perkins
- Toni Price
- Snooky Pryor
- Doug Sahm
- Silent Partners
- Angela Strehli
- Eddie Taylor
- Eddie Taylor, Memphis Slim, and Matt "Guitar" Murphy
- Luther Tucker
- Lavelle White
- Kim Wilson

== See also ==
- List of record labels
