= Clifford Antone =

American founder of a Texas blues club and a record label (1949–2006)

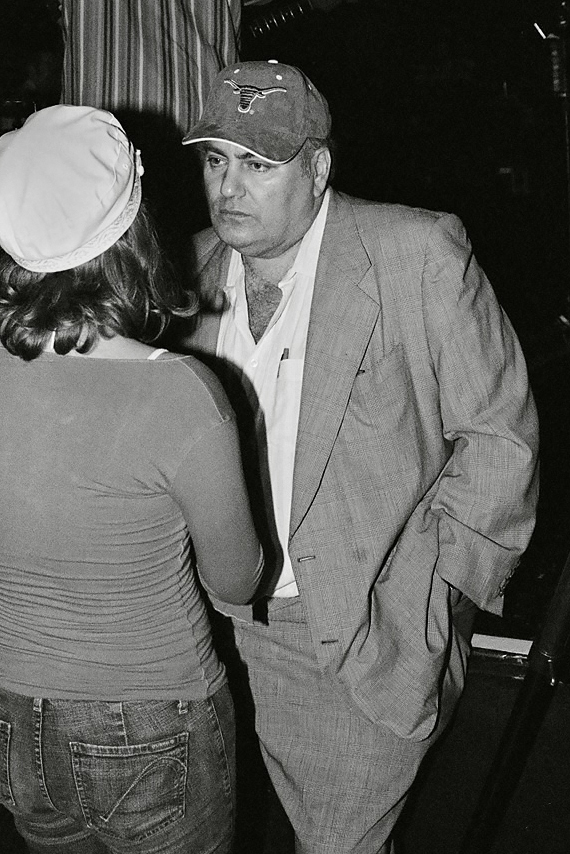
- Clifford Antone talking with a patron of his namesake blues club, Antone's, 2005.
- Born: October 27, 1949
- Died: May 22, 2006 (aged 56)

Clifford Antone (October 27, 1949 – May 22, 2006) was the founder of the eponymous Austin blues club Antone's and independent record label Antone's Records and Tapes, as well as a mentor to Stevie Ray Vaughan, Jimmie Vaughan, Kim Wilson, Gary Clark, Jr., and numerous other musicians. He was the nephew of Jalal Antone, the founder of the Houston-based Antone's Import Co, known for its po-boy sandwiches.

== Biography ==
Born in Port Arthur, Texas, to Greek Orthodox Lebanese and Syrian American parents who had settled in Eastern Texas, Antone moved to Austin in 1968 and attended The University of Texas at Austin. An arrest for marijuana led to his dropping out of school.

Nurturing a passion for Chicago blues, On July 15, 1975, Antone started a blues club at age 25. The club, Antone's, became one of the first music venues on Austin's 6th Street and helped lead to Austin's reputation as a music city. Clifton Chenier, Fats Domino, John Lee Hooker, Delbert McClinton, Pinetop Perkins, Muddy Waters, Albert Collins, Jimmy Reed, Clarence "Gatemouth" Brown, B.B. King, Sue Foley, Gary Clark Jr., and many other notable blues musicians have performed at Antone's since 1975. Two years before his death, a documentary film Antone's: Home of the Blues was made filled with historical and dynamic blues performances from the earliest days of the club.

In 1987, Antone founded a recording label, Antone's Records and Tapes (later renamed as Antone's Records). He also opened Antone's Record Shop, a record store specializing in blues and roots music. Antone served time in federal prisons for drug charges in the early 1980s and in 2000. He lectured on social change and the history of the blues at The University of Texas, Austin Community College, and Texas State University in San Marcos, Texas. On hearing of Antone's death, Austin Mayor Will Wynn was quoted as saying, "One of the primary reasons Austin is known as the Live Music Capital of the World is because of Clifford Antone."

In June 1997 the United States court system charged Antone with 11 counts of drug trafficking. The accusation stated that he helped traffic drugs from Mexico. He pleaded guilty to a money laundering count and a distribution count, relating to marijuana, on January 6, 1999. He was sentenced to four years in federal prison.

He died in Austin, Texas, on May 22, 2006, at age 56.

== Sources ==
- "Austin Club Owner Clifford Antone, 56". The Washington Post. Associated Press wire. May 26, 2006. p. B08.
- Celedon, Annalisa (June 1, 2006). "Clifford Antone: A Blues Legend Passes". The Daily Texan.
- Harward, Randy (May 23, 2006). "Blues Club Owner Clifford Antone Dead at 56". HARP Magazine. Archived from the original on June 16, 2006.
- Light, Alan (May 25, 2006). "Clifford Antone, 56; Started Texas Blues Club". The New York Times. p. C15.
