= Juno Award for Blues Album of the Year =

Canadian music award

The Juno Award for "Blues Album of the Year" has been awarded since 1994, as recognition each year for the best blues album in Canada. The award used to be a combined blues and gospel award category.

== Winners ==
=== Best Blues/Gospel Album (1994–1997) ===
Year	Winner	Album	Nominees	Ref.
1994	Colin Linden	South at Eight/North at Nine	You Can't Have Everything – Dutch Mason; Bluesology – The Whiteley Brothers; Terra Firma Boogie – Triple Threat	
1995	Montreal Jubilation Gospel Choir	Joy to the World Jubilation V	Good Times Guaranteed – Downchild Blues Band; Home Is Where the Harp Is - Live – Harpdog Brown and the Bloodhounds; Welcome Back – John Ellison; Just Gettin' Started – Rita Chiarelli	
1996	Jim Byrnes	That River	Rites of Passage – Georgette Fry; Urban Blues Re:Newell – King Biscuit Boy; Big City Blues – Sue Foley; When the Sun Goes Down – The Sidemen	
1997	Long John Baldry	Right to Sing the Blues	If My Daddy Could See Me Now – Johnny V; Alive & Loose – Kenny "Blues Boss" Wayne; Sixteen Shades of Ble – The Whiteley Brothers; Fire – Tongues of Fire	

=== Best Blues Album (1998–2002) ===
Year	Winner	Album	Nominees	Ref.
1998	Colin James	National Steel	No Special Rider – Bill Bourne / Andreas Schuld / Hans Stamer; A Big Love – Lester Quitzau; What Were You Thinking? – The Rockin' Highliners; In the Evening – Vann "Piano Man" Walls	
1999	Fathead	Blues Weather	Big Boy (Some Recycled Blues and Other Somewhat Related Stuff) – Carlos del Junco; Colin James and The Little Big Band II – Colin James; Blues Boss Boogie – Kenny "Blues Boss" Wayne; Blues Money – Michael Pickett	
2000	Ray Bonneville	Gust of Wind	Blues Party – Chris Whiteley; Michael Jerome Browne – Michael Jerome Browne; Call It What You Want – Steve Hill	
2001	Sue Foley	Love Comin' Down	Topless – Big Daddy G; Neck Bones & Cavier – Mel Brown; Conversation With The Blues – Michael Pickett; Rough Luck – Ray Bonneville	
2002	Colin Linden	Big Mouth	Double Shot! – Mel Brown & Snooky Pryor; Drive On – Michael Jerome Browne; Rattlebag – Paul Reddick & The Sidemen; Breakfast At Midnight – Rita Chiarelli	

=== Blues Album of the Year (2003–present) ===
Year	Winner	Album	Nominees	Ref.
2003	Jack de Keyzer	6 String Loverl	First Class Riff-Raff – Fathead; Wise and Otherwise – Harry Manx; 88th & Jump Street – Kenny "Blues Boss" Wayne; Long Hard Road – The Twisters	
2004	Morgan Davis	Painkiller	Sweet Taste – Harrison Kennedy; Jubilee – Harry Manx & Kevin Breit; Roll It Down – Ray Bonneville; Too Much Fun – The Rockit 88 Band	
2005	Garrett Mason	I'm Just A Man	Come On In – Downchild; Fresh Horses – Jim Byrnes; Soap Bars & Dog Ears – Jimmy Bowskill; No One To Blame – Rita Chiarelli	
2006	Kenny "Blues Boss" Wayne	Let It Loose	Voice + Story – Harrison Kennedy; Songs Of Vice And Sorrow – Julian Fauth; Villanelle – Paul Reddick; The Gas And The Clutch – The Perpetrators	
2007	Jim Byrnes	House of Refuge	Colin James & The Little Big Band 3 – Colin James; Easin' Back To Tennessee – Colin Linden; Acoustic – David Gogo; The Way It Feels – Roxanne Potvin	
2008	Fathead	Building Full of Blues	High Country Blues – Harrison Kennedy; Blues Thing – Jack de Keyzer; Junction City – Little Miss Higgins; A Lesson I've Learned – The Johnny Max Band	
2009	Julian Fauth	Ramblin’ Son	Get Way Back- A Tribute To Percy Mayfield – Amos Garrett; Acoustic Blues- Got 'Em From The Bottom – Big Dave McLean; Love & Sound - Garrett Mason; Mess of Blues - Jeff Healey	
2010	Jack de Keyzer	The Corktown Sessions	Steady Movin' – Carlos del Junco; From The Water – Colin Linden; I Need A Hat – Downchild; Low Fidelity – Treasa Levasseur	
2011	Jim Byrnes	Everywhere West	Where's The Blues Taking Me – Fathead; Bread and Buddha – Harry Manx; It's A Long Road – The Johnny Max Band; The Sojourners – The Sojourners	
2012	MonkeyJunk	To Behold	Still Blue – Bill Johnson; Soul Bender – David Gogo; Shame The Devil – Harrison Kennedy; Me ‘n’ Mabel – Suzie Vinnick	
2013	Steve Strongman	A Natural Fact	FIFTEEN – Colin James; Electric Love – Jack de Keyzer; Time – Shakura S'Aida; Solo Recordings Volume One – Steve Hill	
2014	Downchild Blues Band	Can You Hear the Music	Come on Down – David Gogo; Soulscape – Harrison Kennedy; My Guitar's My Only Friend – James 'Buddy' Rogers; All Frequencies – MonkeyJunk	
2015	Steve Hill	Solo Recordings, Vol. 2	Belmont Boulevard – JW-Jones; Let Me Prove It To You – Steve Strongman; Wicked – The 24th Street Wailers; A Real Fine Mess – Harpoonist & The Axe Murderer	
2016	Harrison Kennedy	This Is From Here	Faded But Not Gone – Big Dave McLean; Brothers in This World – Blackburn Brothers; Vicksburg Call – David Gogo; Sliding Delta – Michael Jerome Browne	
2017	Paul Reddick	Ride the One	Blue Highways – Colin James; Rich in Love – Colin Linden; Monkey Brain – Sean Pinchin; The Northern South Vol. 1 – Whitehorse	
2018	MonkeyJunk	Time to Roll	Better the Devil You Know – Big Dave McLean; Something I’ve Done – Downchild; No Time Like Now – Steve Strongman; Big City, Back Country Blues – Williams, Wayne and Isaak	
2019	Colin James	Miles to Go	Checkmate – Jack de Keyzer; The Ice Queen – Sue Foley; Myles Goodwyn and Friends of the Blues – Myles Goodwyn; Run to Me – Samantha Martin & Delta Sugar	
2020	Dawn Tyler Watson	Mad Love	That's Where It's At – Michael Jerome Browne; Hand Me Down Blues – Durham County Poets; Pocket Full of Nothin' – Big Dave McLean; The Northern South, Vol. 2 – Whitehorse	
2021	Crystal Shawanda	Church House Blues	Hell Bent With Grace — Angel Forrest; Solar Powered Too — Rick Fines; The Reckless One — Samantha Martin & Delta Sugar; Spirits in the Water — Dione Taylor	
2022	Colin James	Open Road	bLOW — Colin Linden; Hope Dies Last — Steve Marriner; Live at the Isabel — Miss Emily; Pinky's Blues — Sue Foley	
2023	Angelique Francis	Long River	Live at the King Eddy — Harpoonist & The Axe Murderer; Midnight Blues — Crystal Shawanda; Preach to My Soul — Spencer Mackenzie; Thanks for Tomorrow — Harrison Kennedy	
2024	Blue Moon Marquee	Scream, Holler & Howl	Matt Andersen, The Big Bottle of Joy; Blackburn Brothers, Soulfunkn'blues; Michael Jerome Browne, Gettin' Together; Brandon Isaak, One Step Closer	
2025	Big Dave McLean	This Old Life	Blue Moon Marquee, New Orleans Sessions; Sue Foley, One Guitar Woman; David Gogo, Yeah!; Samantha King and the Midnight Outfit, Samantha King and the Midnight Outfit	
2026	Steven Marriner	Hear My Heart	Miss Emily, The Medicine; Secondhand Dreamcar, Answer the Call; Crystal Shawanda, Sing Pretty Blues; Kenny "Blues Boss" Wayne, Oooh Yeah!	
