= Maple Blues Awards =

Canadian music award

The Maple Blues Awards are Canada's blues awards, "honouring the finest in Canadian blues". They are the only comprehensive national best in blues awards program. The program's goal is to promote blues music across Canada, and to recognize outstanding achievement. The Maple Blues Awards have been presented by the Toronto Blues Society since their inception in 1997.

The nominees are selected by a panel of blues experts. The panel includes radio hosts, journalists, and festival organizers regionally distributed across Canada. Members of the Nominating Panel are not eligible for any of the awards.

Nominees are voted for by the public. In 2011, the voting process was altered, and the Instrument categories (guitar, harmonica, piano/keyboards, horn, drums & bass) were voted on by the Nominating Panel. The remainder of the categories were voted on by the public.

The winners of the Maple Blues Awards are announced at the Annual Maple Blues Awards Gala in Toronto, Ontario. The evening also includes musical performances by the Maple Blues Band, composed entirely of Maple Blues Awards winners and nominees.

== Current award categories ==
- Entertainer of the Year
- Electric Act of the Year
- Acoustic Act of the Year
- Male Vocalist of the Year
- Female Vocalist of the Year
- New Artist/Group of the Year
- International Artist of the Year
- Recording of the Year
- Guitar Player of the Year
- Harmonica Player of the Year
- Piano/Keyboard Player of the Year
- Horn Player of the Year
- Drummer of the Year
- Bassist of the Year
- Songwriter of the Year
- Blues Booster of the Year
- Blues With A Feeling Award (Lifetime Achievement Award)

== Winners by year ==
=== The 1st Annual Maple Blues Awards (1997) ===
The 1st Annual Maple Blues Awards
| Category | Winner |
|---|---|
| Entertainer of the Year | Colin James |
| Acoustic Act of the Year | Colin James |
| Electric Act of the Year | Fathead |
| New Artist of the Year | Robin Bank$ Blues Band |
| Male Vocalist of the Year | Colin James |
| Female Vocalist of the Year | Rita Chiarelli |
| International Artist of the Year | B.B. King |
| Producer of the Year | Colin Linden |
| SOCAN Songwriter of the Year | Chris Whiteley |
| Guitarist of the Year | Colin James |
| Harmonica Player of the Year | Carlos del Junco |
| Piano/Keyboard Player of the Year | Vann "Piano Man" Walls |
| Horn Player of the Year | Johnny Ferriera |
| Drummer of the Year | Maureen Brown |
| Bassist of the Year | Gary Kendall |
| Recording of the Year | Colin James - National Steel |
| Media Person of the Year | Holger Petersen |
| Blues With A Feeling Award | Long John Baldry |

=== The 2nd Annual Maple Blues Awards (1998) ===
The 2nd Annual Maple Blues Awards
| Category | Winner |
|---|---|
| Entertainer of the Year | Colin James |
| Acoustic Act of the Year | Rick Fines |
| Electric Act of the Year | Colin James and the Little Big Band |
| Male Vocalist of the Year | Colin James |
| Female Vocalist of the Year | Rita Chiarelli |
| International Artist of the Year | B.B. King |
| Producer of the Year | Colin James |
| New Artist of the Year | Tyler Yarema and his Rhythm |
| Guitarist of the Year | Colin James |
| Harmonica Player of the Year | Carlos del Junco |
| Piano/Keyboard Player of the Year | Vann "Piano Man" Walls |
| Horn Player of the Year | Chris Whiteley |
| Drummer of the Year | Maureen Brown |
| Bassist of the Year | Terry Wilkins |
| SOCAN Songwriter of the Year | Colin Linden |
| Recording of the Year | Colin James - Colin James and the Little Big Band II |
| Blues Booster of the Year | Mark Monahan |
| Blues With A Feeling Award | Jackie Washington |

=== The 3rd Annual Maple Blues Awards (1999) ===
The 3rd Annual Maple Blues Awards
| Category | Winner |
|---|---|
| Entertainer of the Year | Colin James |
| Acoustic Act of the Year | Rick Fines |
| Electric Act of the Year | Fathead |
| Male Vocalist of the Year | Chuck Jackson |
| Female Vocalist of the Year | Rita Chiarelli / Sue Foley |
| International Artist of the Year | B.B. King |
| New Artist/Group of the Year | Raoul & The Big Time |
| Guitarist of the Year | Teddy Leonard (Fathead) |
| Harmonica Player of the Year | Michael Pickett |
| Songwriter of the Year | Morgan Davis |
| Piano/Keyboard Player of the Year | Tyler Yarema |
| Horn Player of the Year | Pat Carey (Downchild Blues Band) |
| Drummer of the Year | Maureen Brown |
| Bassist of the Year | Gary Kendall |
| Recording of the Year | Jack de Keyzer - Down in the Groove |
| Producer of the Year | Alec Fraser, Morgan Davis & Colin Linden |
| Blues Booster of the Year | Brent Staeben (Harvest Jazz & Blues Festival) |
| Blues With A Feeling Award | Michael Pickett |

=== The 4th Annual Maple Blues Awards (2000) ===
The 4th Annual Maple Blues Awards
| Category | Winner |
|---|---|
| Entertainer of the Year | Sue Foley |
| Acoustic Act of the Year | Morgan Davis |
| Electric Act of the Year | Steve Hill |
| Male Vocalist of the Year | Colin James |
| Female Vocalist of the Year | Sue Foley |
| International Artist of the Year | B.B. King |
| New Artist of the Year | Carson Downey Band |
| Guitarist of the Year | Sue Foley |
| Harmonica Player of the Year | Carlos del Junco |
| Piano/Keyboard Player of the Year | Michael Fonfara |
| Horn Player of the Year | Pat Carey (Downchild) |
| Drummer of the Year | Murray Downey |
| Bass Player of the Year | Gary Kendall |
| Songwriter of the Year | Sue Foley |
| Recording of the Year | Sue Foley - Love Comin' Down |
| Producer of the Year | Colin Linden |
| Blues Booster of the Year | Ralph Stordeur |
| Blues With A Feeling Award | Jack de Keyzer |

=== The 5th Annual Maple Blues Awards (2001) ===
The 5th Annual Maple Blues Awards
| Category | Winner |
|---|---|
| Entertainer of the Year | Sue Foley |
| Acoustic Act of the Year | Michael Jerome Browne |
| Electric Act of the Year | Paul Reddick & The Sidemen |
| Male Vocalist of the Year | John Mays (Fathead) |
| Female Vocalist of the Year | Sue Foley |
| International Artist of the Year | Duke Robillard |
| New Artist/Group of the Year | Big Mark & The Blues Express |
| Guitarist of the Year | Sue Foley |
| Harmonica Player of the Year | Tortoise Blue (Big Daddy G) |
| Piano/Keyboard Player of the Year | Richard Bell |
| Horn Player of the Year | Pat Carey (Downchild) |
| Drummer of the Year | Tom Bona |
| Bass Player of the Year | Stephen Barry |
| Songwriter of the Year | Paul Reddick |
| Recording of the Year | Paul Reddick & The Sidemen - Rattlebag |
| Producer of the Year | Colin Linden |
| Blues Booster of the Year | Fred Litwin (NorthernBlues Music) |
| Blues With A Feeling Award | Jeff Healey |

=== The 6th Annual Maple Blues Awards (2002) ===
The 6th Annual Maple Blues Awards
| Category | Winner |
|---|---|
| Entertainer of the Year | Sue Foley |
| Acoustic Act of the Year | Harry Manx |
| Electric Act of the Year | Sue Foley |
| Male Vocalist of the Year | John Mays (Fathead) |
| Female Vocalist of the Year | Sue Foley |
| International Artist of the Year | Duke Robillard |
| New Artist of the Year | David Rotundo & The Blue Canadians |
| Guitarist of the Year | David Gogo |
| Harmonica Player of the Year | Michael Pickett |
| Piano/Keyboard Player of the Year | Kenny "Blues Boss" Wayne |
| Horn Player of the Year | Pat Carey (Downchild) |
| Drummer of the Year | Tom Bona |
| Bass Player of the Year | Gary Kendall |
| Songwriter of the Year | Sue Foley |
| Recording of the Year | Sue Foley - Where The Action Is |
| Producer of the Year | Colin Linden |
| Blues Booster of the Year | Andrew Galloway |
| Blues With A Feeling Award | Chuck Jackson |

=== The 7th Annual Maple Blues Awards (2003) ===
The 7th Annual Maple Blues Awards
| Category | Winner |
|---|---|
| Entertainer of the Year | Jack de Keyzer |
| Acoustic Act of the Year | Harry Manx |
| Electric Act of the Year | Jack de Keyzer |
| Male Vocalist of the Year | Morgan Davis |
| Female Vocalist of the Year | Suzie Vinnick |
| International Artist of the Year | Duke Robillard |
| New Artist/Group of the Year | Rockit 88 Band |
| Guitarist of the Year | Jack de Keyzer |
| Harmonica Player of the Year | Carlos del Junco |
| Piano/Keyboard Player of the Year | Kenny "Blues Boss" Wayne |
| Horn Player of the Year | Shirley Jackson |
| Drummer of the Year | Tom Bona |
| Bass Player of the Year | Shane Scott |
| Songwriter of the Year | Morgan Davis |
| Recording of the Year | Morgan Davis - Painkiller |
| Producer of the Year | Alec Fraser & Morgan Davis |
| Blues Booster of the Year | Elaine Bomberry |
| Blues With A Feeling Award | Mel Brown |

=== The 8th Annual Maple Blues Awards (2004) ===
The 8th Annual Maple Blues Awards
| Category | Winner |
|---|---|
| Entertainer of the Year | Matt Minglewood |
| Acoustic Act of the Year | Sue Foley |
| Electric Act of the Year | JW-Jones Blues Band |
| Male Vocalist of the Year | John Mays (Fathead) |
| Female Vocalist of the Year | Sue Foley |
| International Artist of the Year | B.B. King |
| New Artist of the Year | Jimmy Bowskill |
| Guitarist of the Year | David Gogo |
| Harmonica Player of the Year | Carlos del Junco |
| Piano/Keyboard Player of the Year | Michael Fonfara |
| Horn Player of the Year | Pat Carey (Downchild) |
| Drummer of the Year | Tom Bona |
| Bass Player of the Year | Alec Fraser |
| Songwriter of the Year | Morgan Davis |
| Recording of the Year | Sue Foley - Change |
| Producer of the Year | Colin Linden and Janiva Magness |
| Blues Booster of the Year | Brian Slack |
| Blues With A Feeling Award | Jackie Richardson |

=== The 9th Annual Maple Blues Awards (2005) ===
The 9th Annual Maple Blues Awards
| Category | Winner |
|---|---|
| Entertainer of the Year | Downchild Blues Band |
| Acoustic Act of the Year | Harry Manx |
| Electric Act of the Year | Downchild Blues Band |
| Male Vocalist of the Year | Paul Reddick |
| Female Vocalist of the Year | Dawn Tyler Watson |
| International Artist of the Year | B.B. King |
| New Artist/Group of the Year | Garrett Mason |
| Guitarist of the Year | Jack de Keyzer |
| Harmonica Player of the Year | Carlos del Junco |
| Piano/Keyboard Player of the Year | Kenny "Blues Boss" Wayne |
| Horn Player of the Year | Chris Whiteley |
| Drummer of the Year | Mike Fitzpatrick |
| Bass Player of the Year | Gary Kendall |
| Songwriter of the Year | Paul Reddick |
| Recording of the Year | Downchild Blues Band - Come On In |
| Producer of the Year | Colin Linden |
| Blues Booster of the Year | Richard Flohil |
| Blues With A Feeling Award | Danny Marks |

=== The 10th Annual Maple Blues Awards (2006) ===
The 10th Annual Maple Blues Awards
| Category | Winner |
|---|---|
| Entertainer of the Year | Downchild Blues Band |
| Acoustic Act of the Year | Hot Todday/Isaac & Blewitt |
| Electric Act of the Year | Colin James |
| Male Vocalist of the Year | Jim Byrnes |
| Female Vocalist of the Year | Suzie Vinnick |
| International Artist of the Year | Keb' Mo' |
| New Artist of the Year | Ndidi Onukwulu |
| Guitarist of the Year | John Campbelljohn |
| Harmonica Player of the Year | Carlos del Junco |
| Piano/Keyboard Player of the Year | Kenny "Blues Boss" Wayne |
| Horn Player of the Year | Chris Whiteley |
| Drummer of the Year | Geoff Arsenault |
| Bass Player of the Year | Suzie Vinnick |
| Songwriter of the Year | Rick Fines & Suzie Vinnick |
| Recording of the Year | Jim Byrnes - House of Refuge |
| Blues With A Feeling Award | Colin Linden |

=== The 11th Annual Maple Blues Awards (2007) ===
The 11th Annual Maple Blues Awards
| Category | Winner |
|---|---|
| Entertainer of the Year | Colin James |
| Acoustic Act of the Year | Harry Manx & Kevin Breit |
| Electric Act of the Year | Colin James & The Little Big Band |
| Male Vocalist of the Year | Chuck Jackson |
| Female Vocalist of the Year | Dawn Tyler Watson |
| International Artist of the Year | Watermelon Slim and the Workers |
| New Artist/Group of the Year | Thom Swift |
| Guitarist of the Year | Jack de Keyzer |
| Harmonica Player of the Year | David Rotundo |
| Piano/Keyboard Player of the Year | Michael Fonfara |
| Horn Player of the Year | Pat Carey |
| Drummer of the Year | Mike Fitzpatrick |
| Bass Player of the Year | Gary Kendall |
| Songwriter of the Year | Harry Manx |
| Recording of the Year | Colin James - Colin James & The Little Big Band: 3 |
| Blues Booster of the Year | Brad Wheeler |
| Blues With A Feeling Award | Big Dave McLean |

=== The 12th Annual Maple Blues Awards (2008) ===
In 2008, the late Jeff Healey and his band members won seven of the 17 awards presented.

The 12th Annual Maple Blues Awards
| Category | Winner |
|---|---|
| Entertainer of the Year | Jeff Healey |
| Acoustic Act of the Year | Harry Manx |
| Electric Act of the Year | Jeff Healey |
| Male Vocalist of the Year | Jon Mays (Fathead) |
| Female Vocalist of the Year | Suzie Vinnick |
| International Artist of the Year | Taj Mahal |
| New Artist of the Year | Daddy Long Legs |
| Guitarist of the Year | Jeff Healey |
| Harmonica Player of the Year | Steve Marriner |
| Piano/Keyboard Player of the Year | Dave Murphy |
| Horn Player of the Year | Pat Carey |
| Drummer of the Year | Al Webster |
| Bass Player of the Year | Alec Fraser |
| Songwriter of the Year | Paul Reddick |
| Recording of the Year | Jeff Healey - Mess of Blues |
| Blues Booster of the Year | Rob Bowman |
| Blues With A Feeling Award | Amos Garrett |

=== The 13th Annual Maple Blues Awards (2009) ===
The Toronto Blues Society held its 13th annual Maple Blues Awards ceremony on January 18, 2010, at the brand new Koerner Hall at The Royal Conservatory of Music in Toronto, Ontario.

The 13th Annual Maple Blues Awards
| Category | Winner |
|---|---|
| Entertainer of the Year | MonkeyJunk |
| Acoustic Act of the Year | Harry Manx |
| Electric Act of the Year | MonkeyJunk |
| Male Vocalist of the Year | Steve Marriner (MonkeyJunk) |
| Female Vocalist of the Year | Suzie Vinnick |
| International Artist of the Year | Taj Mahal |
| New Artist/Group of the Year | Blackburn |
| Guitarist of the Year | Tony D (MonkeyJunk) |
| Harmonica Player of the Year | Steve Marriner (MonkeyJunk) |
| Piano/Keyboard Player of the Year | Michael Fonfara |
| Horn Player of the Year | Chris Whiteley |
| Drummer of the Year | Bucky Berger (Fathead) |
| Bass Player of the Year | Alec Fraser |
| Songwriter of the Year | Chris Whiteley & Diana Braithwaite |
| Recording of the Year | Jeff Healey - Songs From The Road |
| Blues With A Feeling Award | Chris Whiteley |

=== The 14th Annual Maple Blues Awards (2010) ===
The 14th Annual Maple Blues Awards
| Category | Winner |
|---|---|
| Entertainer of the Year | Matt Andersen |
| Acoustic Act of the Year | Matt Andersen |
| Electric Act of the Year | MonkeyJunk |
| Male Vocalist of the Year | Jon Mays (Fathead) |
| Female Vocalist of the Year | Shakura S'Aida |
| International Artist of the Year | Derek Trucks & Susan Tedeschi Band |
| New Artist of the Year | Mike "Shrimp Daddy" Reid |
| Guitarist of the Year | Garrett Mason |
| Harmonica Player of the Year | Steve Marriner |
| Piano/Keyboard Player of the Year | Julian Fauth |
| Horn Player of the Year | Chris Whiteley |
| Drummer of the Year | Matt Sobb |
| Bass Player of the Year | Keith Picot |
| Songwriter of the Year | Paul Reddick & Colin Linden |
| Recording of the Year | Downchild - I Need A Hat |
| Blues Booster of the Year | Gord MacAulay |
| Blues With A Feeling Award | Rita Chiarelli |

=== The 15th Annual Maple Blues Awards (2011) ===
The 15th Annual Maple Blues Awards
| Category | Winner |
|---|---|
| Entertainer of the Year | Matt Andersen |
| Acoustic Act of the Year | Matt Andersen |
| Electric Act of the Year | MonkeyJunk |
| Male Vocalist of the Year | Matt Andersen |
| Female Vocalist of the Year | Suzie Vinnick |
| International Artist of the Year | Gregg Allman |
| New Artist/Group of the Year | Sabrina Weeks & Swing Cat Bounce |
| Guitar Player of the Year | Steve Strongman |
| Harmonica Player of the Year | Carlos del Junco |
| Piano/Keyboard Player of the Year | Kenny "Blues Boss" Wayne |
| Horn Player of the Year | Chris Whiteley |
| Drummer of the Year | Matt Sobb |
| Bass Player of the Year | Alec Fraser |
| Songwriter of the Year | Suzie Vinnick |
| Recording of the Year | MonkeyJunk - To Behold |
| Blues Booster of the Year | Liz Sykes |
| Blues With A Feeling Award | Paul James |

=== The 16th Annual Maple Blues Awards (2012) ===
The 16th Annual Maple Blues Awards
| Category | Winner |
|---|---|
| Entertainer of the Year | Colin James |
| Acoustic Act of the Year | Suzie Vinnick |
| Electric Act of the Year | MonkeyJunk |
| Male Vocalist of the Year | Matt Andersen |
| Female Vocalist of the Year | Suzie Vinnick |
| International Artist of the Year | Tedeschi Trucks Band |
| New Artist/Group of the Year | Steve Kozak |
| Guitar Player of the Year | Steve Strongman |
| Harmonica Player of the Year | Steve Marriner |
| Piano/Keyboard Player of the Year | David Vest |
| Horn Player of the Year | Jon Wong |
| Drummer of the Year | Matt Sobb |
| Bass Player of the Year | Gary Kendall |
| Songwriter of the Year | Steve Strongman |
| Recording of the Year | Steve Strongman - A Natural Fact |
| Blues Booster of the Year | John Valenteyn |
| Blues With A Feeling (Lifetime Achievement) | Matt Minglewood |

=== The 17th Annual Maple Blues Awards (2013) ===
The 17th Annual Maple Blues Awards
| Category | Winner |
|---|---|
| Entertainer of the Year | MonkeyJunk |
| Acoustic Act of the Year | Dawn Tyler Watson and Paul Deslauriers |
| Electric Act of the Year | MonkeyJunk |
| Male Vocalist of the Year | Jim Byrnes |
| Female Vocalist of the Year | Angel Forrest |
| International Artist of the Year | Tedeschi Trucks Band |
| New Artist/Group of the Year | The Mackenzie Blues Band |
| Guitar Player of the Year | Paul Deslauriers |
| Harmonica Player of the Year | Steve Marriner |
| Piano/Keyboard Player of the Year | Lance Anderson |
| Horn Player of the Year | Chris Whiteley |
| Drummer of the Year | Tom Bona |
| Bass Player of the Year | Gary Kendall |
| Songwriter of the Year | MonkeyJunk "Steve Marriner, Matt Sobb and Tony Diteodoro" |
| Recording of the Year | MonkeyJunk - All Frequencies |
| Blues Booster of the Year | Tim Hortons Southside Shuffle |
| Blues With A Feeling (Lifetime Achievement) | Bob Walsh |

=== The 18th Annual Maple Blues Awards (2014) ===
The 18th Annual Maple Blues Awards
| Category | Winner |
|---|---|
| Entertainer of the Year | Steve Hill |
| Acoustic Act of the Year | Brandon Isaak |
| Electric Act of the Year | Steve Hill |
| Male Vocalist of the Year | Matt Andersen |
| Female Vocalist of the Year | Angel Forrest |
| International Artist of the Year | Tedeschi Trucks Band |
| New Artist/Group of the Year | Wicked Grin |
| Guitar Player of the Year | Steve Hill |
| Harmonica Player of the Year | TIE: Guy Bélanger and Harpdog Brown |
| Piano/Keyboard Player of the Year | David Vest |
| Horn Player of the Year | Jon Wong (The 24th Street Wailers) |
| Drummer of the Year | Tom Bona (Soulstack; Raoul & The Big Time) |
| Bass Player of the Year | Greg Morency (Paul DesLauriers Band) |
| Songwriter of the Year | Angel Forrest |
| Recording of the Year | Steve Hill - Solo Recordings Vol. 2 |
| Blues Booster of the Year | Peter North |
| Blues With A Feeling (Lifetime Achievement) | Nanette Workman |

=== The 19th Annual Maple Blues Awards (2015) ===
The 19th Annual Maple Blues Awards
| Category | Winner |
|---|---|
| Entertainer of the Year | Steve Hill |
| Acoustic Act of the Year | Big Dave McLean |
| Electric Act of the Year | Steve Hill |
| Male Vocalist of the Year | Matt Andersen |
| Female Vocalist of the Year | Angel Forrest |
| International Artist of the Year | Buddy Guy |
| New Artist/Group of the Year | Kirby Sewell Band |
| Guitar Player of the Year | Steve Hill |
| Harmonica Player of the Year | Harpdog Brown |
| Piano/Keyboard Player of the Year | David Vest |
| Horn Player of the Year | Jon Wong (The 24th Street Wailers) |
| Drummer of the Year | Tom Bona (Soulstack; Raoul & The Big Time) |
| Bass Player of the Year | Leigh-Anne Stanton (Wicked Grin) |
| Songwriter of the Year | Colin Linden |
| Recording of the Year | Colin Linden - Rich In Love (Stony Plain). Producers: Colin Linden, Jon Dymond, Gary Craig |
| Blues Booster of the Year | Larry Kurtz |
| Blues With A Feeling (Lifetime Achievement) | Theresa Malenfant |

=== The 20th Annual Maple Blues Awards (2016) ===
The 20th Annual Maple Blues Awards
| Category | Winner |
|---|---|
| Entertainer of the Year | The Paul DesLauriers Band |
| Acoustic Act of the Year | Big Dave McLean |
| Electric Act of the Year | The Paul DesLauriers Band |
| Male Vocalist of the Year | Matt Andersen |
| Female Vocalist of the Year | Angel Forrest |
| International Artist of the Year | Joe Bonamassa |
| New Artist/Group of the Year | Spencer Mackenzie |
| Guitar Player of the Year | David Gogo |
| Harmonica Player of the Year | Harpdog Brown |
| Piano/Keyboard Player of the Year | Kenny "Blues Boss" Wayne |
| Horn Player of the Year | Frankie Thiffault |
| Drummer of the Year | Sam Harrisson (The Paul DesLauriers Band) |
| Bass Player of the Year | Greg Morency (The Paul DesLauriers Band) |
| Songwriter of the Year | Angel Forrest & Denis Coulombe |
| Recording of the Year | Angel Forrest - Angel's 11 (Morningstar). Producers: Angel Forrest and Denis Coulombe |
| Blues Booster of the Year | Cam Hayden |
| Blues With A Feeling (Lifetime Achievement) | Stephen Barry |

=== The 21st Annual Maple Blues Awards (2017) ===
The 21st Annual Maple Blues Awards
| Category | Winner |
|---|---|
| Entertainer of the Year | The Paul DesLauriers Band |
| Acoustic Act of the Year | Big Dave McLean |
| Electric Act of the Year | Colin James |
| Male Vocalist of the Year | Matt Andersen |
| Female Vocalist of the Year | Angel Forrest |
| International Artist of the Year | Joe Bonamassa |
| New Artist/Group of the Year | Jason Buie |
| Guitar Player of the Year | Colin James |
| Harmonica Player of the Year | Guy Bélanger |
| Piano/Keyboard Player of the Year | David Vest |
| Horn Player of the Year | Jon Wong |
| Drummer of the Year | Matt Sobb |
| Bass Player of the Year | Laura Greenberg |
| Songwriter of the Year | Harrison Kennedy |
| Recording/Producer of the Year | Colin James - Blue Highways (True North) Producers: Colin James & Dave Meszaros |
| Blues With A Feeling (Lifetime Achievement) | Diana Braithwaite |

=== The 22nd Annual Maple Blues Awards (2018) ===
The 22nd Annual Maple Blues Awards
| Category | Winner |
|---|---|
| Entertainer of the Year | Colin James |
| Acoustic Act of the Year | Big Dave McLean |
| Electric Act of the Year | Colin James |
| Male Vocalist of the Year | Colin James |
| Female Vocalist of the Year | Angel Forrest |
| International Artist of the Year | Buddy Guy |
| New Artist/Group of the Year | Emily Burgess |
| Guitar Player of the Year | Sue Foley |
| Harmonica Player of the Year | Steve Marriner |
| Piano/Keyboard Player of the Year | David Vest |
| Horn Player of the Year | Shirley Jackson |
| Drummer of the Year | Lindsay Beaver |
| Bass Player of the Year | Laura Greenberg (JW-Jones) |
| Songwriter of the Year | Colin James |
| Recording/Producer of the Year | Colin James - Miles to Go (True North) Producers: Colin James Dave Meszaros |
| Blues With A Feeling (Lifetime Achievement) | Ellen McIlwaine |
| Blues Booster of the Year | The Hornby Island Blues Society |

=== The 23nd Annual Maple Blues Awards (2019) ===
The 23nd Annual Maple Blues Awards
| Category | Winner |
|---|---|
| Entertainer of the Year | Downchild Blues Band |
| Acoustic Act of the Year | Matt Andersen |
| Electric Act of the Year | Colin James |
| Male Vocalist of the Year | Matt Andersen |
| Female Vocalist of the Year | Miss Emily |
| International Artist of the Year | Buddy Guy |
| New Artist/Group of the Year | Miss Emily |
| Guitar Player of the Year | Paul DesLauriers |
| Harmonica Player of the Year | Harpdog Brown & Steve Marriner (tie) |
| Piano/Keyboard Player of the Year | Kenny “Blues Boss” Wayne |
| Horn Player of the Year | Chris Whiteley & Mat “Moose” Mousseau (tie) |
| Drummer of the Year | Tom Bona |
| Bass Player of the Year | Alec McElcheran |
| Songwriter of the Year | Dawn Tyler Watson |
| Recording/Producer of the Year | Dawn Tyler Watson – Mad Love (Self) Producers: Francois Thiffault & Dawn Tyler Watson |
| Blues With A Feeling (Lifetime Achievement) | Michael Jerome Browne |
| Blues Booster of the Year | Brian Blain |

=== The 24nd Annual Maple Blues Awards (2020) ===
The 24nd Annual Maple Blues Awards
| Category | Winner |
|---|---|
| Entertainer of the Year | Dawn Tyler Watson |
| Acoustic Act of the Year | Matt Andersen |
| Electric Act of the Year | Jack de Keyzer |
| Male Vocalist of the Year | Matt Andersen |
| Female Vocalist of the Year | Angel Forrest |
| B.B. King International Artist of the Year | Ghost Town Blues Band |
| New Artist/Group of the Year | Smoke Wagon Blues Band |
| Guitar Player of the Year | Garrett Mason |
| Harmonica Player of the Year | Steve Marriner |
| Piano/Keyboard Player of the Year | Jesse O'Brien |
| Horn Player of the Year | Mark LeClerc |
| Drummer of the Year | Gary Craig |
| Bassist of the Year | John Dymond |
| Songwriter of the Year | Colin Linden |
| Recording/Producer of the Year | Ballad of Albert Johnson (Self) ARTIST: Smoke Wagon Blues Band PRODUCER: Steve Sherman |
| Blues With A Feeling (Lifetime Achievement) | Joe Murphy & Ken Whitely (tie) |
| Blues Booster of the Year | Cindy McLeod |

=== The 25nd Annual Maple Blues Awards (2021) ===
The 25nd Annual Maple Blues Awards
| Category | Winner |
|---|---|
| Entertainer of the Year | Sue Foley |
| Acoustic Act of the Year | David Gogo & Steve Marriner |
| Electric Act of the Year | Colin James |
| Male Vocalist of the Year | Colin James |
| Female Vocalist of the Year | Miss Emily |
| B.B. King International Artist of the Year | Bonnie Raitt |
| New Artist/Group of the Year | Lowdown Dirty Mojos |
| Guitarist of the Year | Sue Foley |
| Harmonica Player of the Year | Steve Marriner |
| Piano/Keyboard Player of the Year | David Vest |
| Horn Player of the Year | Alison Young |
| Drummer of the Year | Lindsay Beaver |
| Bassist of the Year | Keith Picot |
| Songwriter of the Year | Steve Marrier |
| Recording/Producer of the Year | Hope Dies Last (Stony Plain) ARTIST: Steve Marriner PRODUCER: Steve Marriner |
| Blues With A Feeling (Lifetime Achievement) | Shakura S'Aida |
| Blues Booster of the Year | Claude Cloutier and Terry Parsons (tie) |

=== The 26nd Annual Maple Blues Awards (2022) ===
The 26nd Annual Maple Blues Awards
| Category | Winner |
|---|---|
| Entertainer of the Year | Blue Moon Marquee |
| Acoustic Act of the Year | Blue Moon Marquee |
| Electric Act of the Year | Colin James |
| Male Vocalist of the Year | Matt Andersen |
| Female Vocalist of the Year | Suzie Vinnick |
| B.B. King International Artist of the Year | Mavis Staples |
| New Artist/Group of the Year | Angelique Francis |
| Guitarist of the Year | Sue Foley |
| Harmonica Player of the Year | Steve Marriner |
| Piano/Keyboard Player of the Year | Jesse O'Brien |
| Horn Player of the Year | Alison Young |
| Drummer of the Year | Jim Casson |
| Bassist of the Year | Keith Picot |
| Songwriter of the Year | Blue Moon Marquee |
| Recording/Producer of the Year | Blue Moon Marquee |
| Blues With A Feeling (Lifetime Achievement) | Harrison Kennedy |
| Blues Booster of the Year | Patrick Monaghan |
