= Edwin Orion Brownell =

Canadian musician and author

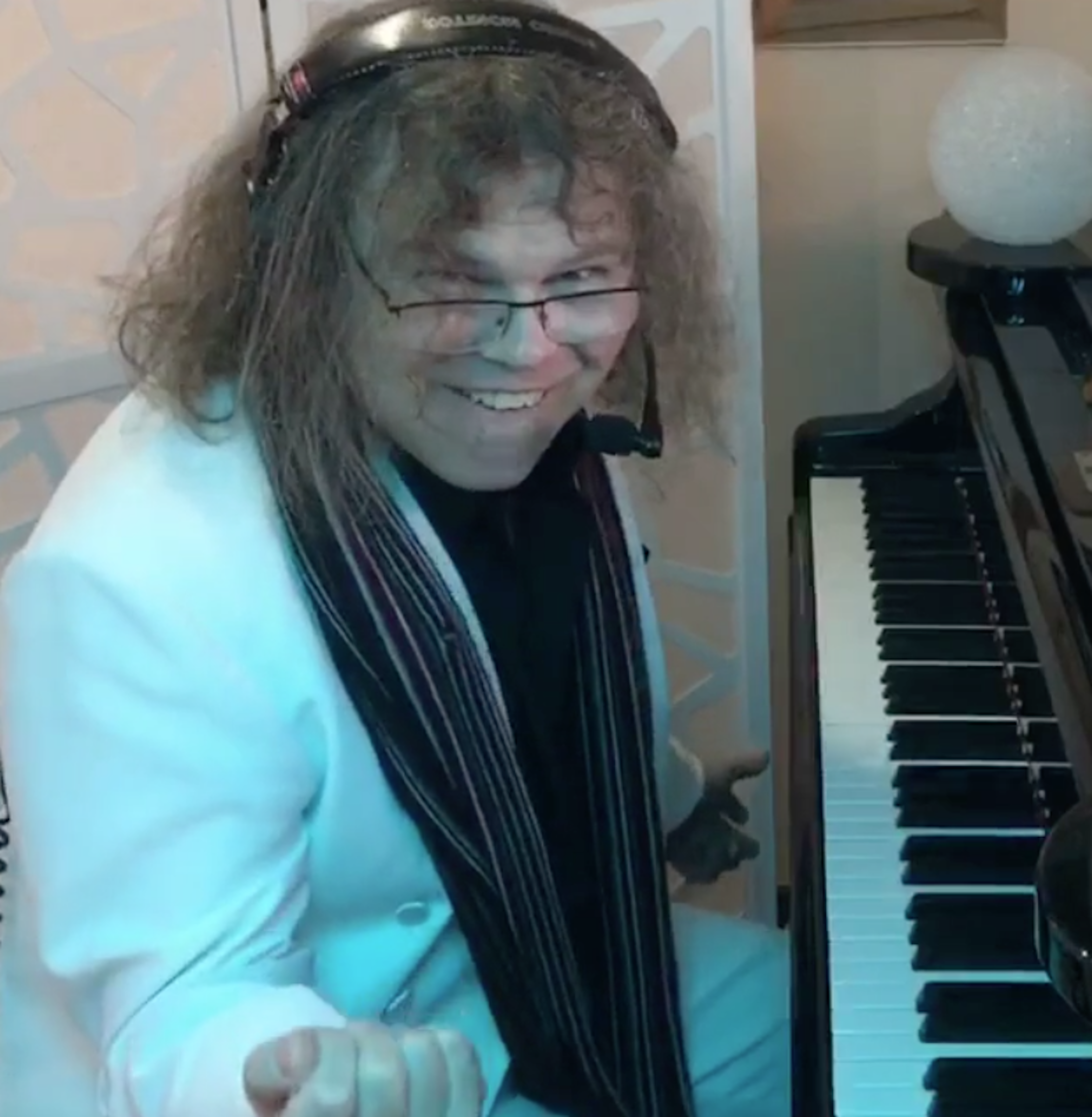
- Edwin Orion Brownell at Place des Arts, October 2009.

Background information
- Born: November 30, 1964 (age 61); Ottawa, Ontario, Canada
- Genres: Classical; Neo-classical; Romantic; Blues; Rock; R&B
- Instruments: Piano, vocals
- Years active: 1984–present
- Label: Brownell Music
- Website: brownellmusic.com

Edwin Orion Brownell (born November 30, 1964, in Ottawa, Ontario) is a Canadian musician and author. He is a neo-classical composer and concert pianist whose original music has been described as highly melodic; exhibiting an improvisational blues influence over a classical foundation.

== Biography ==
Brownell started studying piano at the age of four and two years later started working through the Royal Conservatory curriculum (Canada) until his late teens, when he began playing rock and roll professionally.

From 1984 to 1991, Brownell was a member of the popular Ontario rock groups Longbottom, Inside Out and Straight No Chaser. In 1990 he moved to Montreal, where he founded Edwin and the Bedouins, and with this band toured throughout eastern Canada and North Africa, recording the albums Somebody's Watching You (1996), Bering and Beyond (2006), One for All (2011) and Before (2018). Throughout this time he also played as a sideman in many of Montreal's top local acts including Black and Blue, Angel and the Bad Boys, Crawdaddy and Souled Out.

As a bandleader, Brownell also worked in nightclubs and arenas in central Canada with Montreal musicians including singers Angel Forrest and Bobby Lee Silcott, drummer Jerry Mercer (Mashmakhan, Triangle, April Wine), and guitarist John McGale and bassist Breen LeBoeuf (Offenbach). He also opened shows for Bruce Cockburn and Burton Cummings (The Guess Who).

In 2003, Edwin Orion Brownell returned to his classical roots, studying performance, composition and orchestration. His first two solo-piano recordings Maimonides Pops and Music of the Dance (2005) contain a mix of originals and classical standards and the neo-classical flavour of these CDs was expanded upon with his release of his all-original double album: Journey of the Spirit (2007) and his combination CD/DVD: Smile (2009) which included a documentary of the artist as well as concert footage from his 2007 Place des Arts performance in Montreal.

Brownell followed this up with the launch of his chamber music album Songs of Love and Marriage in 2012. This CD marked his first foray into arranging and featured Flaviu and Loredana Zanca (on violin and cello respectively) as The Zara Strings, along with guests Stéphanie Caplette (violin) and Xavier Lepage-Brault (viola) and the "So Happy Choir". Brownell's next CD was the live album "Forever Laughter" (2014) released with The Zara Strings at his fourth Place des Arts concert in Montreal.

Between 2013 and 2016 Brownell wrote a history book Operation Hannibal inspired by his mother's escape from the Eastern Front. Besides following his mother's journey, the work describes about the German Navy's evacuation of over two million civilians in the last four months of the World War II.

2013 also marked the twentieth anniversary of his group Edwin and the Bedouins and over the next five years this event was celebrated with a series of shows and benefit concerts featuring Breen LeBoeuf, Jerry Mercer, Gary Moffet, Carl Dixon (Coney Hatch, April Wine, The Guess Who) and Paul Harwood (Mahogany Rush).

During this period of time Brownell also wrote, arranged and produced two additional chamber music CDs. The first recording, titled "The Inside Track," was launched at Loyola Chapel in Montreal in October 2016 with a sextet version of The Zara Strings (Veronica Ungureanu replaced Stéphanie Caplette on second violin and Linda Rand appeared on bassoon and flute). Several suites from this concert were recorded and these tracks formed the basis of the composer's eleventh CD and eighth classical album "Songs for Canada", released at the Harold Greenspon Concert Hall in the Eleanor London Library in Côte Saint-Luc in April 2017.

With the onset of the 2020 COVID-19 pandemic, Brownell began a series of online concerts, doing nightly shows over the first 2 months. His album "Edwin Orion Brownell Goes Baroque" was released at his 99th online show and he ended his second run of concerts with his 100th show on September 11, 2020. After taking a two-month break, Brownell restarted his "Corona Family Concert" series with a third run in early December 2020. During this series the entertainer did two "awareness" concerts for the diseases ALS and Arachnoiditis as well as fundraisers for a local musician and Covid Relief in India. At his 133rd show he launched his 14th album "Romance" and closed the series the next week, after his online work was featured on Global News and in Montreal Jewish Magazine. Claiming to have given more full online concerts through the time of the COVID-19 lockdowns than any other musician, Brownell went back to his regular concerts at this time, only to restart the series when the Omicron Variant forced him out of in-person work again. During the fourth series, he raised money for the care of feral cats in Cote-St-Luc, launched his 15th CD "Mo'Roccan the Blues" and hosted another fundraiser, this time with musicians David Wilkenfeld, Angel Forrest and Carl Dixon for Médecins du Monde's work in Ukraine.

== Present ==
Currently, while Brownell continues his online concert series, he has returned to full time in-person concert work and has written and started production on his next two albums: "The Waltz King," and "The Donald is an Asshole and Other Hits of 2020."

He has also started writing a second book, which is called "Panzers in Retreat." In this book he wants to examine the armed forces of the Soviet Union and Nazi Germany in the end of the Second World War.

== Community ==
Always active in the community, Brownell has given the gift of his enduring music to numerous charitable fundraisers, and has played in many benefits such as those thrown for Montreal Women's Shelter, Earth First!, Greenpeace, Concordia University (the Keith Lowther Fellowship), the Quebec Diabetes Foundation, the Montreal Children's Hospital, the Head and Hands Clinic, "The Marathon of Hope: Philippine Relief Concert", Oxfam Québec Benefit for the Syrian Refugees, Sheldon Kagan's Benefit Concerts for the Cummings Jewish Centre for Seniors (2016) and the Shield of Athena (2017) at the Rialto Theatre (Montreal). and at "Re-Creating Home: a Benefit Soirée for a Syrian Family" at Christ Church Cathedral (Montreal) in Montreal (2018). During the 2020 COVID-19 pandemic. Brownell, working with Oxfam Quebec, mobilized his online fanbase to raise money for relief efforts in Lebanon after the 2020 Beirut explosion. In 2021 he did the same for Covid Relief in India, and in 2022 did a benefit concert for Ukraine with Médecins du Monde.

== Discography ==
=== Edwin Orion Brownell classical recordings ===
- Maimonides Pops (2005)
- Music of the Dance (2005)
- Journey of the Spirit (2007)
- SMILE (2009)
- Songs of Love and Marriage (2012)
- Forever Laughter (2014)
- The Inside Track (2016)
- Songs for Canada (2017)
- Edwin Orion Brownell Goes Baroque (2020)
- Romance (2021)

=== Other recordings ===
Edwin and the Bedouins

- Somebody's Watching You (1996)
- Bering and Beyond (2006)
- One for All (2011)
- Mo'Roccan the Blues (2022)

Various artists

- Before (2018)

Angel and the Bad Boys

- Second Hand Blues (1995)
- Angel Sings Janis (1997)
- Preservation Blues Review (1999)

Bobby Lee Silcott

- Voodoo (1998)

East Coast Wendy and the West

- Live at Avanti (1998)

Too Blues

- Too Blues (1999)

Wayne Dwyer

- Dwyer (2000)

Fred Cusinato

- BPP Radio (2013)
