= Samantha Martin & Delta Sugar =

Canadian band

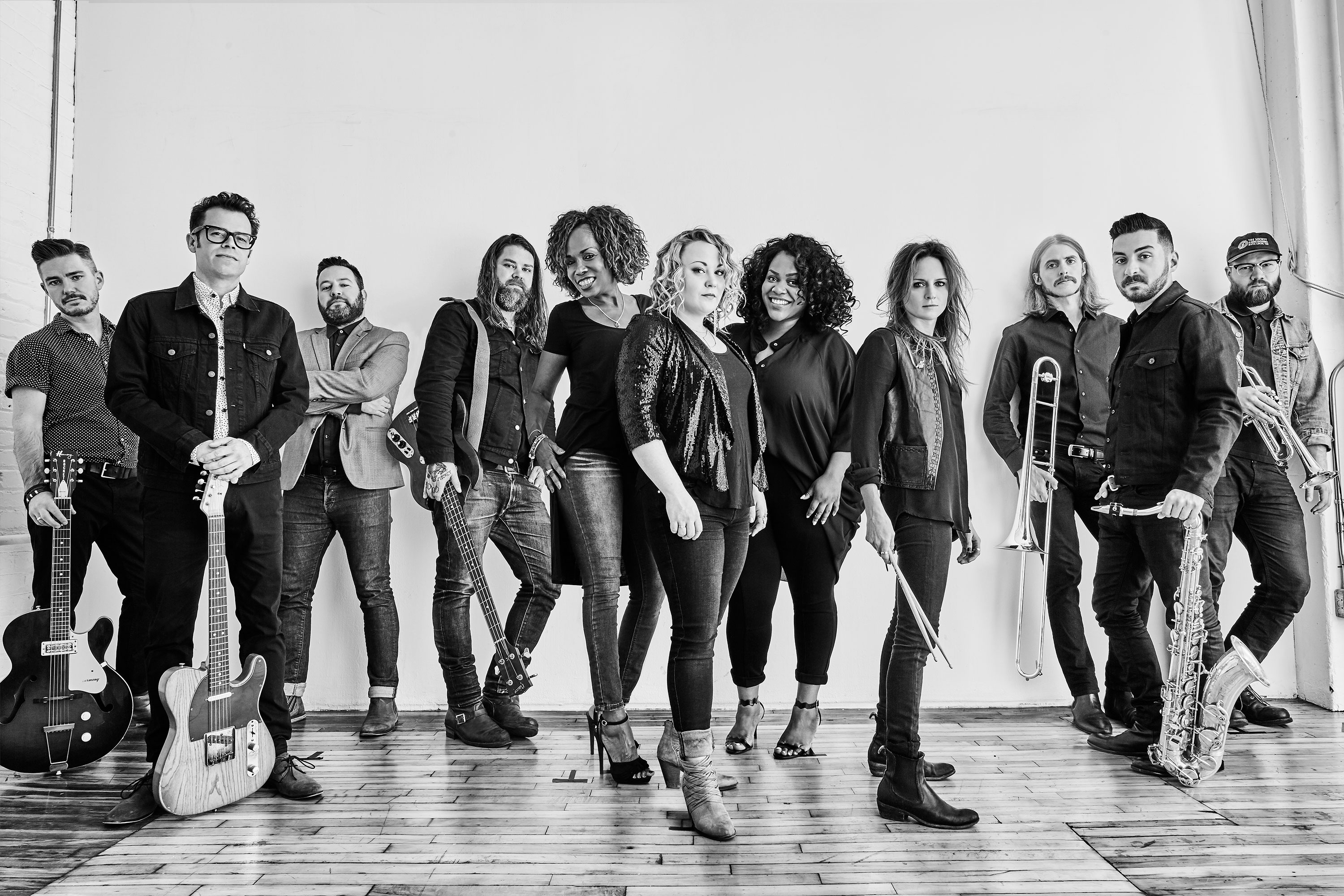
- Samantha Martin in 2018

Background information
- Origin: Toronto, Canada
- Genres: R&B; Southern soul; soul; blues
- Years active: 2015–present
- Labels: Samantha Martin, Gypsy Soul
- Website: samanthamartinmusic.com

Samantha Martin & Delta Sugar are an eleven-piece band from Toronto, Canada, known for their blend of blues, soul, gospel, and rock.

== History ==
Samantha Martin formed the soul and blues focused band "Samantha Martin & Delta Sugar" in 2014. The band's name stems from Martin's love of Southern blues traditions. Their debut record Send the Nightingale, was released in 2015. According to Martin, the songs on Send the Nightingale were influenced by her mother's terminal illness at the time she was recording the album.

Send the Nightingale received four nominations at the 2015 Maple Blues Awards, including Best Female Vocalist, Best Songwriter, Best New Group, and Best New Album/Producer.

In 2018, Samantha Martin & Delta Sugar signed a record deal with Gypsy Soul Records based out of Toronto. Their record Run to Me was released on April 28, 2018. Eleven months after releasing Run to Me, the band was nominated for a Juno Award for Blues Album of the Year. Run to Me also received four Maple Blues Awards nominations.

Their third album, The Reckless One, was released November 20, 2020. The band received three nominations for the 2021 Maple Blues Awards.

== Discography ==
Albums

Title	Year	Artist	Label	Producer
Send the Nightingale	2015	Samantha Martin & Delta Sugar	Samantha Martin Music	Rench
Run to Me	2018	Samantha Martin & Delta Sugar	Gypsy Soul Records	Darcy Yates
The Reckless One	2020	Samantha Martin & Delta Sugar	Gypsy Soul Records	Darcy Yates and Renan Yildizdogan
