= Big Dave McLean =

- Born: August 23, 1952 (age 73); Yorkton, Saskatchewan, Canada
- Origin: Winnipeg, Manitoba, Canada
- Genres: Blues
- Occupations: Guitarist, harmonicist, singer and songwriter
- Instruments: Guitar, harmonica, vocals
- Years active: 1970s–present
- Labels: Stony Plain Records, Black Hen Music

Big Dave McLean (born August 23, 1952) is a Canadian blues guitarist, harmonicist, singer and songwriter. A veteran performer, his work has had an influence on many western Canadian blues musicians, including Colin James and Wide Mouth Mason. Notable McLean songs include "She's Got the Stuff", "Kanadiana", "Up On Waverly", and "St. Mary At Main".

Billboard noted that "Big Dave's been the quintessential behind-the-scene bluesman. He's done more to shape the Western Canadian blues scene than perhaps any other artist".

In 2019, Big Dave McLean was awarded the Order of Canada for his musical influence of Delta and Chicago blues and for mentoring musicians.

== Life and career ==
McLean was born in Yorkton, Saskatchewan, Canada, to a concert pianist mother, and a Presbyterian minister father. They later lived in Moose Jaw, before relocating to Winnipeg, Manitoba when Dave was at the age of 10. Introduced to the blues as a teenager via his older brother's record collection, the two siblings travelled to the Mariposa Folk Festival in Toronto in 1969. While there, John P. Hammond gave McLean an impromptu lesson on guitar playing, to supplement the latter's rudimentary efforts thus far at playing the harmonica. This meeting saw McLean learning how to play Bo Diddley's, "I'm a Man". McLean much later recalled the incident stating that Hammond was "one of the most courteous gentlemen on this planet, you know, totally helpful, inspiring".

McLean starting playing at the Regina Folk Club, and at the Winnipeg Folk Festival, where he gained experience before releasing his debut album, Muddy Waters For President (1989), which was recorded at the Bud's On Broadway club in Saskatoon. McLean had previously opened for his musical hero, Muddy Waters.

The follow-up was For The Blues... Always (1998), an attempt to spread his music to a wider audience. The album was produced by Colin James and recorded in Vancouver, with musicians James (guitar), Norm Fisher (bass), Eric Webster (piano) and Chris Norquiest (drums), all augmenting McLean's work. The track listing included McLean's cover versions of "Little Red Rooster" (Willie Dixon), "Just Your Fool" (Little Walter), "Dust My Broom" (Elmore James), "Rollin' and Tumblin'" (Muddy Waters) and "Cakewalk Into Town" (Taj Mahal). The three-day recording's budget was only $1,600. In addition to performing and recording, McLean spent around 20 years regularly doing odd jobs, such as construction work, to supplement his income.

In 1998, he played in a duo with Tim Williams at the Calgary Folk Music Festival. McLean has also appeared solo at the Sasktel Saskatchewan Jazz Fest.

Blues from the Middle (2003) was his second Stony Plains release, and included guest contributions from Sue Foley and Duke Robillard. It was followed by Acoustic Blues (Got 'Em From The Bottom) in 2008.

Faded But Not Gone was released in 2014 on Black Hen Music, and dealt with the aftermath of the deaths of McLean's mother and brother. Recorded in Nashville, the album contained contributions from Colin Linden, Colin James, and Kevin McKendree, with Ann and Regina McCrary on backing vocals.

In 2015, McLean starred in a low budget film documentary, Ain't About the Money, exploring the trials and tribulations in performing the blues.

== Other ventures ==
Patrick Friesen wrote Singer, a docu-drama on Richard Manuel for CBC Radio Manitoba (1989), which featured McLean; as well as Voice, a 1996 radio documentary (featuring McLean and Tracey Dahl), by CBC Radio Manitoba and produced by Andrea Ratuski.

In 1991, Saturday Night Blues, a compilation album of recordings by Canadian blues performers, was released by Stony Plain Records and the Canadian Broadcasting Corporation. It contained the Big Dave McLean and the Muddy-Tones track, "T.V. Preacher Blues". In 2006, McLean contributed the track "Howlin' for My Baby" to Saturday Night Blues: 20 Years, a double compilation album also released by CBC.

In 2005, The Perpetrators contributed to a tribute album to McLean, entitled We Best Choose to Pick the Blues.

== Awards ==
- Whisky Award, 2005
  - Runner-up for Singer of the Year
- Western Canadian Music Award, 2004
  - Outstanding Blues Recording – Blues from the Middle
- Prairie Music Award, 1999
  - Outstanding Blues Recording – For the Blues... Always
- Great Canadian Blues Award, 1998
- Juno Award
  - 1992 (winner – Saturday Night Blues)
  - 2009 (nominated)
  - 2016 (nominated)
  - 2025 (winner - Juno Award for Blues Album of the Year)
- Maple Blues Award nominations:
  - Acoustic Act Of The Year, 1998, 1999, 2000 & 2003
  - Blues With A Feeling Award, 2007 (winner)
- Toronto Blues Society Lifetime Achievement Award
- Order of Canada, 2019

== Discography ==
=== Solo albums ===
| Year | Title | Record label |
|---|---|---|
| 1989 | Muddy Waters for President | Kings Alley Records |
| 1998 | For the Blues... Always | Stony Plain Records |
| 2003 | Blues from the Middle | Stony Plain Records |
| 2008 | Acoustic Blues (Got 'Em From The Bottom) | Stony Plain Records |
| 2014 | Faded But Not Gone | Black Hen Music |
| 2016 | Better The Devil You Know | Black Hen Music |
| 2019 | Pocket Full of Nothin' | Black Hen Music |
| 2024 | This Old Life | Cordova Bay Records |

== See also ==
- Canadian blues
- List of blues musicians
