= Blue Moon Marquee =

Blue Moon Marquee is a Canadian swing blues duo from British Columbia, consisting of vocalist and guitarist A.W. Cardinal and vocalist, bassist and drummer Jasmine Colette. They are most noted for their 2022 album Scream, Holler & Howl, for which they won the Juno Award for Blues Album of the Year, and were nominated for Contemporary Indigenous Artist of the Year, at the Juno Awards of 2024.

== History ==
The band was first formed in the 2010s after Colette was hired to contribute to Stainless Steel Heart, an album which is credited to Cardinal as a solo artist. Their first demo album as an official duo, Lonesome Ghosts, was released in 2014, and was followed by Last Dollar later in 2014, Gypsy Blues in 2016, Bare Knuckles & Brawn in 2019, and Scream, Holler & Howl in 2022. They also won two Summer Solstice Indigenous Music Awards in 2023 for Live Performance of the Year and Roots Album of the Year. A.W. Cardinal is of Cree/Metis heritage.

Cardinal received a Canadian Folk Music Award nomination for Indigenous Songwriter of the Year for Bare Knuckles & Brawn at the 16th Canadian Folk Music Awards in 2021. In 2023 the band won four Maple Blues Awards, for Entertainer of the Year, Acoustic Act of the Year, Songwriter of the Year and Recording Producer of the Year.

In 2026 their song "Put Your Feathers On", a collaboration with Northern Cree, was longlisted for the SOCAN Polaris Song Prize.
