= Bill Johnson (blues musician) =

Canadian musician

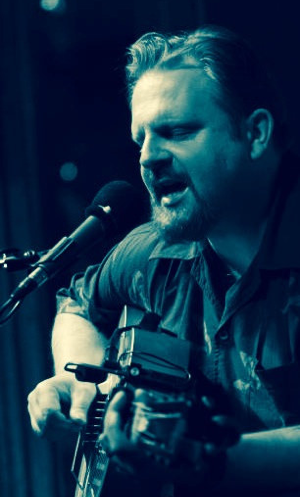

Background information
- Born: William Lloyd Johnson; Halifax, Nova Scotia, Canada
- Origin: Victoria, British Columbia, Canada
- Genres: Blues
- Occupations: Singer-songwriter, musician, music educator
- Instruments: Guitar (acoustic, electric, lap slide), vocals, flute, harmonica
- Years active: 1980s–present
- Labels: Independent, Woodrock Music Canada
- Website: BillJohnsonBlues.com

Bill Johnson (born in Halifax, Nova Scotia) is a Canadian blues guitarist, singer-songwriter and music educator. After a long career as a sideman and guitarist in the 1990s, he began touring with The Bill Johnson Band. They released their second album, Live, in 2006, which led to Johnson being nominated for Best Guitarist at the Maple Blues Awards. He self-released his third solo album, Still Blue, in 2010, which was nominated for Blues Album of the Year at the Juno Awards of 2012. Johnson continues to tour and has hosted blues workshops throughout Canada.

== Early life ==
William Lloyd Johnson was born in Halifax, Nova Scotia. Two years later he and his family moved to Ottawa, Ontario. He comes from an artistic family, and his mother is Dorothy Oxborough, a notable painter from Victoria, British Columbia. At an early age Johnson would listen to his older brother's collection of blues records, and he has cited his earliest musical interests as Hank Williams, Elvis Presley, the Rolling Stones, Eric Clapton, and in particular Chuck Berry. Johnson has stated, "Chuck Berry was the one that did it for me. Chuck made me want to play guitar." Johnson moved with his family to Victoria when he was nine years old. Uprooted from his friends, Johnson began playing guitar that year, soon excelling in his music classes. He started working as a professional guitarist at age fifteen, and spent most of his teens playing local gigs and studying guitar.

== Music career ==
=== Early years ===
Bill Johnson played with a number of different bands throughout the 1970s and 1980s, not sticking to one particular genre. In the mid-1980s, however, he began to focus on the blues, studying musicians such as B. B. King, Elmore James, and T-Bone Walker. He also performed with artists such as Alligator Records' Son Seals. In the 1990s he played with the Sidewalk Blues Band with Doug Cox, and in 1993 formed his own The Bill Johnson Blues Band. Early on, the band opened for musicians such as Otis Rush and Delbert McClinton, and toured Scandinavia with the Lebeau Petersen Band.

He moved to Calgary, Alberta in 1996, and while there he was featured in recordings by Donald Ray Johnson. He also played as a member of the house band at the King Edward Hotel, and had stints as a sideman with musicians such as Dutch Mason, Hubert Sumlin, Son Seals, and Cash McCall. In 1998, he collaborated with Texan blues musician Don Johnson on the album Donald Ray. In 1999 Johnson moved back to Victoria, British Columbia, to be near his family and to pursue a full-time recording career.

=== Solo albums ===
Johnson's first solo album, 'Why I Sing the Blues, was a collaboration with a number of North American poets. In 2006 he released his first live album, titled simply Live, or The Bill Johnson Blues Band Live. In 2006 the Toronto Blues Society nominated Johnson for a Maple Blues Award for Best Guitarist. He self-released the album Worksongs in 2007, singing and playing solo acoustic guitar.

He self-released his third album, Still Blue, in October 2010. For Still Blue, Rick Erickson contributed bass, John Hunter drums, and Darcy Philips keyboards, with all three musicians at times also contributing to Johnson's vocals. Johnson's long-term collaborator Joby Baker produced the album. In 2010 Johnson was awarded a Blewzy Award for Best Song for the album's track "Half the Man," as well as a Blewzy for Best Blues CD for Still Blue. At the 2011 Maple Blues Awards show, he was nominated for Recording of the Year, Electric Act of the Year and Songwriter of the Year. Still Blue was nominated for Blues Album of the Year at the Juno Awards of 2012. He performed "Half the Man" at the 2012 Maple Blues Awards.

=== 2012–present ===
By January 2012 he was signed to Woodrock Music Canada. He appeared in the play The Life of Willie Mae Thornton with film and music star Jackie Richardson and performed the underscoring live. Early that year he toured British Columbia, playing at the North Vancouver Island Music Festival. Later in 2012 he toured Ontario and he ended the year with another tour of British Columbia. He toured Ontario again in the beginning of 2013, including the Blues Summit VI in Toronto. Gigs in Alberta, British Columbia, Ontario, and Quebec. In 2016 Johnson released his latest CD Cold Outside.

As an educator he has hosted blues workshops throughout Canada, covering topics such as motivating improvement in mature players, rhythm guitar in traditional songs, slide guitar, and constructing blues solos.

== Style, equipment ==
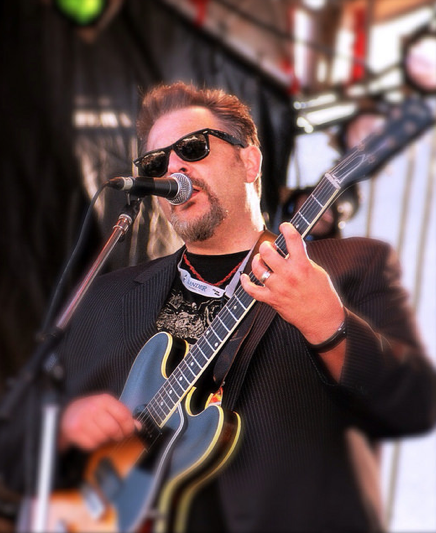
Bill Johnson performing live around 2009 with his 1960 Gibson ES-330 guitar.

Primarily a blues musician, Johnson fuses many eras of the genre with rock, country, and jazz. He regularly performs either as a solo act with an acoustic guitar or with a backing band. Beyond guitar and vocals he also plays harmonica. He draws on influences as diverse as Robert Johnson, Mississippi John Hurt, Lonnie Johnson, Chuck Berry, Muddy Waters, T-Bone Walker, Eric Clapton, B. B. King, and slide guitarists David Lindley and Sonny Landreth. According to the Musicians Association of Victoria and the Islands, "for years he has honed his craft in bars, clubs, festivals and concerts and has achieved a worldly perspective that gives his blues the kind of soul that speaks with authenticity."

In terms of instruments, Johnson is known to regularly use a blonde Gibson ES-335, a Fender Telecaster, and an unusually modified Mexican Stratocaster used for slide only. He is regularly seen playing a Martin D-28 acoustic guitar and a National Tricone resonator guitar. He is known to use Hohner Harmonicas, High Spirit Native Flutes, and has espoused amplifiers and effects made by designer Mark Stephenson, though he often uses vintage Fender amplifiers as well. In 2016 Bill Johnson received an artist endorsement with K&K Sound, a manufacturer of pickups, microphones, and preamps for acoustic instruments.

== Personal life ==
Johnson lives in Victoria, British Columbia

== Discography ==
=== Albums ===
Studio albums by Bill Johnson
Year	Album title	Release details
	Why I Sing the Blues	Released: Label: self-released; Format: CD
2007	Worksongs	Released: 2007; Label: self-released; Format: CD
2010	Still Blue	Released: August 1, 2010; Label: self-released/CD Baby; Format: CD, digital
2016	Cold Outside	Released: May 1, 2016; Label: self-released/CD Baby; Format: CD, digital

=== EPs ===
Live EPs by Bill Johnson
Year	Album title	Release details
2005	Live (by The Bill Johnson Blues Band)	Released: June 1, 2005; Label: self-released; Format: CD, digital

=== Singles ===
Incomplete list of songs by Bill Johnson
Year	Title	Album	Certifications
2005	"Every Day I Have The Blues"	Live	
2005	"Rock Me Baby"	Live	
2005	"Hurtin' Man"	Live	
2010	"Experience"	Still; Blue	
2010	"Worked to Death"	Still; Blue	
2010	"Half The Man"	Still; Blue	Blewzy Award: Best Song

=== As sideman ===
Incomplete performance credits for Bill Johnson
Year	Release title	Artist(s)	Role
1998	Donald Ray	Don Johnson	Guitar

== Awards and nominations ==
Awards and nominations for Bill Johnson
Year	Award	Nominated work	Category	Result
2006	Maple Blues Awards	Bill Johnson, Live	Best Guitarist	Nominated
2010	The Blewzy Awards	"Half the Man"	Best Song	Won
2010	The Blewzy Awards	Still Blue	Best Blues CD	Won
2011	Blues Underground Network	Still Blue	Best Canadian Blues Album	Nominated
2011	Maple Blues Awards	Bill Johnson, Still Blue	Best Song Writer	Nominated
2011	Maple Blues Awards	Bill Johnson, Still Blue	Best Performing Artist	Nominated
2011	Western Canada Music Awards	Still Blue	Best Blues Recording	Nominated
2012	Juno Awards	Still Blue	Best Blues CD	Nominated

== See also ==
- Juno Awards of 2012
