= Jack Paradise: Montreal by Night =

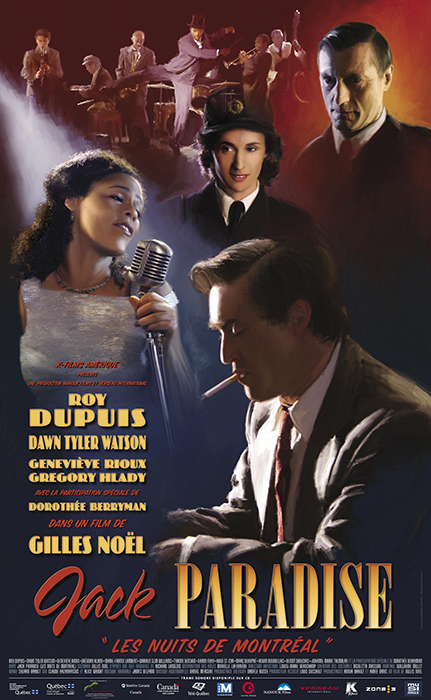
- French: Jack Paradise : Les nuits de Montréal
- Directed by: Gilles Noël
- Written by: Gilles Noël
- Produced by: Anouk Brault; Aimée Danis; Natalie Dion
- Starring: Roy Dupuis; Dawn Tyler Watson; Geneviève Rioux; Gregory Hlady
- Cinematography: Sylvain Brault
- Edited by: Guillaume Millet
- Music by: James Gelfand
- Production companies: Nanouk Films; Verseau International
- Distributed by: K Films Amérique
- Release date: February 20, 2004
- Running time: 90 minutes
- Country: Canada
- Languages: English; French

Jack Paradise: Montreal by Night (French: Jack Paradise : Les nuits de Montréal) is a Canadian drama film, directed by Gilles Noël and released in 2004. The film stars Roy Dupuis as Jacques Paradis, a jazz pianist who becomes a star of Montreal's nightclub scene in the 1930s under the stage name Jack Paradise, and Dawn Tyler Watson as Curly Brown, the singer in his band with whom he has a tumultuous on-again off-again romantic relationship.

The film's cast also includes Geneviève Rioux, Gregory Hlady, Dorothée Berryman, Tyrone Benskin, Fabienne Colas and Warren "Slim" Williams. Music for the film was composed by Montreal jazz musician James Gelfand, and performed by a band including Gelfand, Watson and saxophonist Chet Doxas. Following the film's release, the band performed music from the film at the 2004 Montreal International Jazz Festival.

Gelfand received a Jutra Award nomination for Best Original Music at the 7th Jutra Awards in 2005.
