= Steve Marriner =

Canadian musician (born 1984)

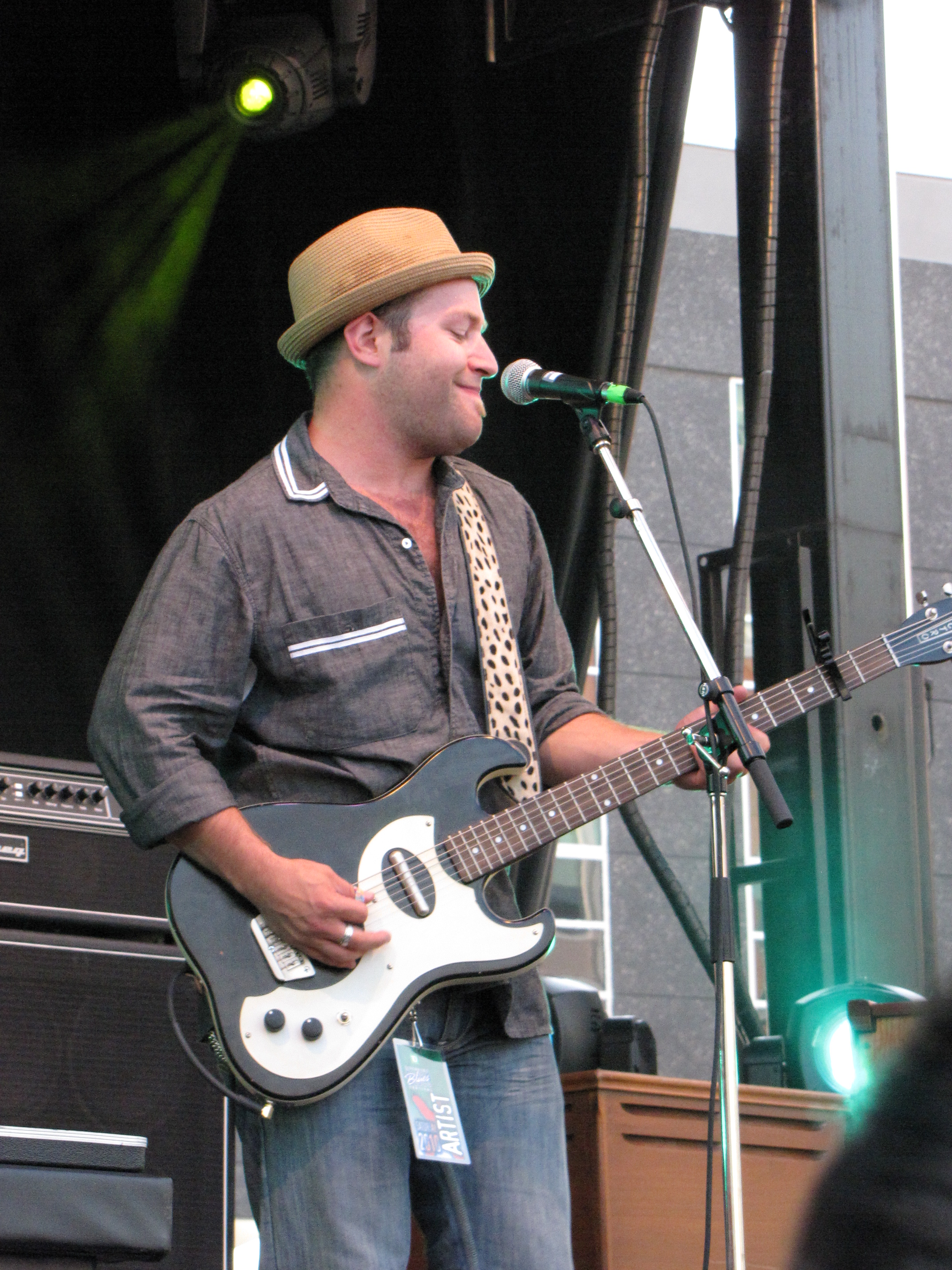
Marriner performing at the 2010 Kitchener Bluesfest

Steve Marriner (born 1984 in Ottawa, Ontario) is a Canadian multi-instrumentalist, singer, songwriter and record producer based in Toronto, Ontario. He first garnered attention in the Ottawa blues scene in his early teens as a prodigy blues harp (harmonica) player. He also plays baritone guitar, electric guitar, piano, Hammond organ, upright bass and electric bass. Since 2008, he has been the frontman, singer, one of two guitarists and harmonica player for the Canadian rock'n'roll-blues group MonkeyJunk. The band's album To Behold won the 2012 Juno Award for Blues Album of the Year.

== Career ==
=== Early years (1996–2007) ===
Marriner began playing the harmonica at eleven years of age. He first studied the harmonica with Ottawa-based bluesman Larry "The Bird" Mootham. After a year of tutelage, Marriner began joining The Bird and his band on stage in Ottawa-area clubs. Before taking the stage for the first time, Marriner was bestowed with the moniker "Southside Steve," a reference to his home on the South end of Ottawa. This stage name was used for the next several years.

In the summer of 1998, at the age of thirteen, "Southside Steve" met guitarist Tony D, (Tony Diteodoro) and would perform regularly with him at The Rainbow Bistro. The two would later form MonkeyJunk with drummer Matt Sobb in 2008.

Later in 1998, Marriner joined The Johnny Russell Band. The band played Chicago Blues and New Orleans music and performed around the provinces of Ontario and Quebec.

In June, 1999, at the age of fourteen, Marriner won the Ottawa Blues Harp Blow-Off, an annual battle of harmonica players held at The Rainbow Bistro. With the win came an appearance on stage at the Ottawa Bluesfest and a recording sessions at Distortion Studios in Ottawa. The Johnny Russell Band used the studio time to record their album Whippersnapper. The album was released in December 1999, and is the earliest public recording of Marriner.

In 2000, Marriner began recording and touring with the JW-Jones Blues Band, contributing both vocals and harp. For the next three years, he performed with the band at clubs, bars, and blues festivals. During that time, Marriner played several shows with Fabulous Thunderbirds frontman, singer and harp player Kim Wilson when the band was backing up Wilson during his performances in Canada. Marriner left in 2003 to attend the University of Ottawa.

In 2004, Marriner joined Canadian folk icon Harry Manx at the Chicago Blues Festival. Following a positive response from the Chicago audience, Manx invited Marriner to accompany him on tour regularly. The two would tour the world together from 2004 until 2007, performing in Australia, France, England, the United States, and Canada. Other early supportive influences included George Pendergrast, Johnny Sansone and Rick Estrin.

Marriner's debut solo album, Going Up, was released in 2007 on Dog My Cat Records, a label co-owned by Harry Manx. The record was reviewed favourably despite low sales and no nominations. The BlogCritics review of the album states that "with only a couple of exceptions the majority of the music on the album follow[s] the standard rock/blues boy wanting girl theme". The review positively notes "Remember Me", with its "plea for the homeless" and the fourth song, which has "a nice rockabilly feel." The reviewer states that there are "glimmers of real talent on this album", such as Marriner's rare ability to play the "complexities of a Flamenco beat". Another review notes the album's "nods to harp legends Little Walter, Junior Wells and Kim Wilson, and states that Marriner's "tight band fan the flames of tradition with a scorching sound for the 21st century." The review states that "Marriner proves himself an adept singer/songwriter who writes highly melodic tunes that are energetic and full of catchy hooks, reminiscent of Delbert McClinton". The review states that "his lyrics stay true to the braggadocio tradition forged by past blues legends." Overall, the review states that the "highlight [is his] blistering harmonica playing", which has a "natural sense of blues phrasing with a down-home, gritty tone." Jazzreview.com states that with its "solid performances and slick production, Going Up is a strong premiere by a driven young blues maverick with crossover potential and all the makings of a star."

=== MonkeyJunk (2008–present) ===
Marriner is the frontman/lead singer and baritone guitar player of MonkeyJunk, a Canadian rock'n'roll/swamp/blues band signed to Stony Plain Records. The band's album To Behold won the 2012 Juno Award for Blues Album of the Year.

=== As a record producer ===
In 2014, Marriner produced Drew Nelson's The Other Side, on which Marriner also co-wrote a number of the songs. It was through Marriner's encouragement and support that Nelson released his first album in eight years. Marriner went on to produce A.J. Fullerton's sophomore album "The Forgiver & The Runaway" recorded winter of 2019, and released on Vizztone records in spring of 2021.

== Awards (in solo capacity) ==
- Marriner has also won multiple awards as a member of MonkeyJunk.
- 2008 Maple Blues Award, Harmonica player of the year
- 2009 Maple Blues Award, Male vocalist of the year
- 2009 Maple Blues Award, Harmonica player of the year
- 2010 Maple Blues Award, Harmonica player of the year
- 2012 Maple Blues Award, Harmonica player of the year
- 2013 Maple Blues Award, Harmonica player of the year
- 2018 Maple Blues Award, Harmonica Player Of The Year
- 2022 Maple Blues Award, Harmonica Player of The Year
- 2022 Maple Blues Award, Acoustic act of the year

== Discography ==
=== With Harry Manx ===
- 2019 Hell Bound for Heaven (Stony Plain Records)

=== Solo ===
- 2007 Going Up (Dog My Cat)

=== With MonkeyJunk ===
- 2009 Tiger in Your Tank (Independent)
- 2011 To Behold (Stony Plain)
- 2013 All Frequencies (Stony Plain)
- 2014 Tiger in Your Tank (Stony Plain)
- 2015 Moon Turn Red (Stony Plain)
- 2018 Time To Roll (Stony Plain Records)

=== As producer ===
- 2011 MonkeyJunk, To Behold (co-producer)
- 2014 Drew Nelson, The Other Side (Capon)
- 2021 A.J. Fullerton, "The Forgiver & The Runaway"

As a guest artist:

- 2013 Lee Holmes, Sit Down Blues (Itsa Music Co)
