= Blackburn Brothers =

Canadian blues band

- Origin: Toronto, Ontario, Canada
- Genres: Blues, Funk, Soul, R&B, Jazz, Rock
- Years active: 1996–present
- Labels: Electro-Fi Records, Arctic Records Canada, Make it Real Records
- Members: Duane Blackburn; Brooke Blackburn; Cory Blackburn; Neil Brathwaite; Andrew Stewart; Ted Peters
- Past members: Mark Ayee
- Website: blackburnbrothersmusic.com

The Blackburn Brothers are a Canadian blues band composed of a core group of three siblings, Duane Blackburn (lead vocals, organ, piano), Brooke Blackburn (guitar, vocals, composition), and Cory Blackburn (drums, harmony vocals). They are most noted as two-time Juno Award nominees for Blues Album of the Year.

Formerly known as Blackburn, the band has been described by Living Blues magazine as a "generational family band [that] plays traditional blues and R&B with a contemporary take."

Additional band members include longtime horn section bandmates Neil Brathwaite on tenor saxophone and Ted Peters on trombone, as well as Andrew Stewart on bass guitar. Their studio production team includes oldest sibling Robert Blackburn (guitar, vocals, composition), Howard Ayee (producer, bass), and cousin Nathan Blackburn (bass).

== History ==
Formed in Toronto, Ontario, Canada in 1996, the band's music synthesizes the blues with rhythm and blues, soul, and funk. Members of the Black Canadian community, they are the sons of blues singer Bobby Dean Blackburn, a longtime performer in Toronto's music scene.

The band's first album, Soul Searchin', was released in 1997.

In 2010, they released their second album, Brotherhood, and won the Maple Blues Award for Best New Band.

In 2015, Blackburn Brothers released Brothers in This World, which earned them their first Juno nomination for Blues Album of The Year at the Juno Awards of 2016.

Their fourth album, SoulFunkn'Blues, was released in 2023, and garnered the band their second Juno Award nomination for Blues Album of the Year at the Juno Awards of 2024. Additionally, the album received three Blues Music Award nominations for Album of the Year, Soul Blues Album of the Year, and Song of the Year (a new precedent from a Canadian band), and a record-setting nine nominations in the 2024 Maple Blues Awards, including Entertainer of the Year and Electric Act of the Year.

== Discography ==
- Soul Searchin' (1997, Arctic Records Canada)
- Brotherhood (2010, Make It Real Records)
- Brothers in This World (2016, Electro-Fi Records) (#1 RMR. May 28, 2015)
- SoulFunkn'Blues (2023, Electro-Fi Records) (#1 RMR. Sept 30, 2023)

== Awards and nominations ==
Year	Award	Category	Result	Reference
2010	Maple Blues Award	Best New Band	Won	
2011	Maple Blues Award	Horn Player of the Year, Neil Braithwaite	Won	
2015	Maple Blues Award	Piano/Keyboard Player of the Year, Duane Blackburn	Nominated	
2016	Juno Award	Blues Album of the Year, Brothers in This World	Nominated	
2016	Maple Blues Award	Electric Act of the Year	Nominated	
2017	Maple Blues Award	Piano/Keyboard Player of the Year, Duane Blackburn	Nominated	
2019	Maple Blues Award	Piano/Keyboard Player of the Year, Duane Blackburn	Nominated	
2020	Maple Blues Award	Drummer of the Year, Cory Blackburn	Nominated	
2020	Maple Blues Award	Piano/Keyboard Player of the Year, Duane Blackburn	Nominated	
2021	Maple Blues Award	Piano/Keyboard Player of the Year, Duane Blackburn	Nominated	
2022	Maple Blues Award	Electric Act of the Year	Nominated	
2022	Maple Blues Award	Drummer of the Year, Cory Blackburn	Nominated	
2023	Canada South Blues Society Hall of Fame	Induction	Won	
2024	Juno Award	Blues Album of the Year, SoulFunkn'Blues	Nominated	
2024	Blues Music Award	Album of the Year, SoulFunkn'Blues	Nominated	
2024	Blues Music Award	Soul Blues Album of the Year, SoulFunkn'Blues	Nominated	
2024	Blues Music Award	Song of the Year, "Bobby's Blues"	Nominated	
2024	Maple Blues Award	Entertainer of the Year	Nominated	
2024	Maple Blues Award	Electric Act of the Year	Nominated	
2024	Maple Blues Award	Songwriter of the Year, Brooke Blackburn	Nominated	
2024	Maple Blues Award	Recording of the Year, SoulFunkn'Blues	Nominated	
2024	Maple Blues Award	Producer of the Year, Howard Ayee and Cory Blackburn	Nominated	
2024	Maple Blues Award	Male Vocalist of the Year, Brooke Blackburn	Nominated	
2024	Maple Blues Award	Guitarist of the Year, Brooke Blackburn	Nominated	
2024	Maple Blues Award	Piano/Keyboard Player of the Year, Duane Blackburn	Nominated	
2024	Maple Blues Award	Drummer of the Year, Cory Blackburn	Nominated	
2024	Maple Blues Award	Bassist of the Year, Nathan Blackburn	Nominated	
