= Harpdog Brown =

Canadian blues singer (1962–2022)

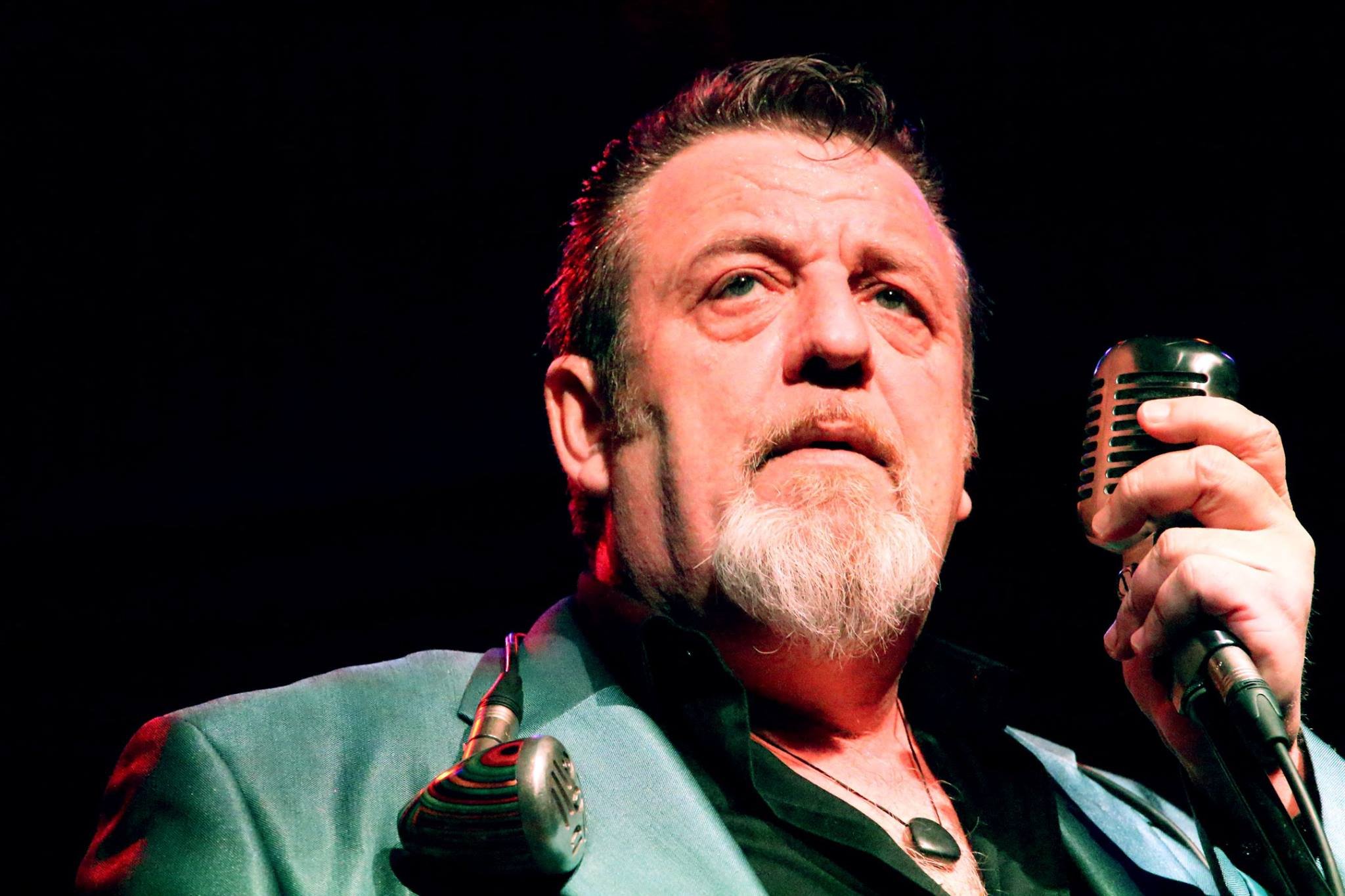
- Brown in 2012

Background information
- Born: January 28, 1962; Edmonton, Alberta, Canada
- Died: January 7, 2022 (aged 59) Alberta, Canada
- Genres: Blues; Canadian blues; Chicago blues
- Occupations: Singer-songwriter; musician
- Instruments: Vocals; harmonica
- Years active: 1982–2022
- Labels: Dogbreath; Vat; Candelight
- Website: harpdogbrown.com

Harpdog Brown (January 28, 1962 – January 7, 2022) was a Canadian singer and harmonica player who had been active in Canada's blues scene since 1982. His distinguished musical career was so honoured by the Maple Blues Awards in 2014, for harmonica player of the year, then again in 2015 and for the third time in a row in 2016. He was also nominated for best male vocals and album of the year in 2016. The Maple Blues Awards are Canada's equivalent of The Blues Music Award formerly the W. C. Handy Awards that take place yearly in Memphis, Tennessee. In that same year, he was also honoured with a lifetime membership to the Hamilton Blues Society.

== Early years ==
Brown was born in Edmonton, Alberta, Canada, and was adopted into a family with a musical mother who played slide guitar. Regarding his name, he said: "Being an adopted child meant I was named twice in the first few years of my life. I met my birth mother when I was twenty-eight years old."

He began playing guitar at about age 15 in a local garage band. He later played in a duo that opened for performers in comedy clubs, and followed that with solo gigs as a singer and guitar player. In the early 1980s he answered an ad for a vocalist in a traveling road band. After six weeks on the road, he quit and put together his own traveling blues band.

Harpdog got his stage name at a gig in Kitsilano Beach during the fall of 1989 at a place called Momma Gold’s. According to Harpdog, at the end of the show, two audience members began shouting "Harpdog! Harpdog!" He liked the name and went on to use it as his stage name. He eventually made it his legal name.

== Career ==
Based in Vancouver, Brown crossed tens of thousands of miles playing club dates and festivals in Canada, the northwestern United States and Germany. Over the years he issued seven albums. In 1995 his Home Is Where the Harp Is won the Muddy Award for the Best NW Blues Release from the Cascade Blues Association in Portland, Oregon. Also that year, it was nominated for a Canadian Juno for the Best Blues/Gospel Recording. Teamed up with Graham Guest on piano, he issued the album Naturally which was voted No. 1 Canadian Blues Album of 2010 by The Blind Lemon Survey.

Brown toured extensively with his guitarist J. Arthur Edmonds, performing their electric mid-1950s Chicago blues either as a duo, or with the full band. While he was home, he juggled a few combos working many venues big and small. He also led The Harpdog Brown Band which was a gutsy traditional Chicago blues band. In 2014 they released What It Is, comprising mainly original songs and a few classic covers. Influential blues promoter and broadcaster Holger Petersen called What It Is Brown's best album.

== Personal life and death ==
Brown had two older sisters. He changed his adopted name to Harpdog Brown after divorcing his wife Samantha whom he had one deaf son named McKinley, saying this left him "free." He died in Alberta on January 7, 2022, at the age of 59.

== Awards and recognitions ==
- 2015 Maple Blues Award, Harmonica Player of the Year
- 2016 Fraser Valley Music Awards, Blues Artist of the Year
- 2014 Maple Blues Award, Harmonica Player of the Year
- 2014 Hamilton Blues Society, Lifetime Award
- 1995 Muddy Award, Best NW Blues Release for Home Is Where the Harp Is

== Discography ==
- 2019: For Love and Money (Dog House Records)
- 2016: Travelin' with the Blues (Dog House Records)
- 2014: What It Is (Dogbreath Records)
- 2011: Naturally (Dogbreath Records)
- 2001: Once in a Howlin' Moon (Vat Records)
- 1994: Home Is Where the Harp Is (Candelight Records)
- 1993: Beware Of Dog (Spinner Music)
