= MonkeyJunk =

Canadian music band

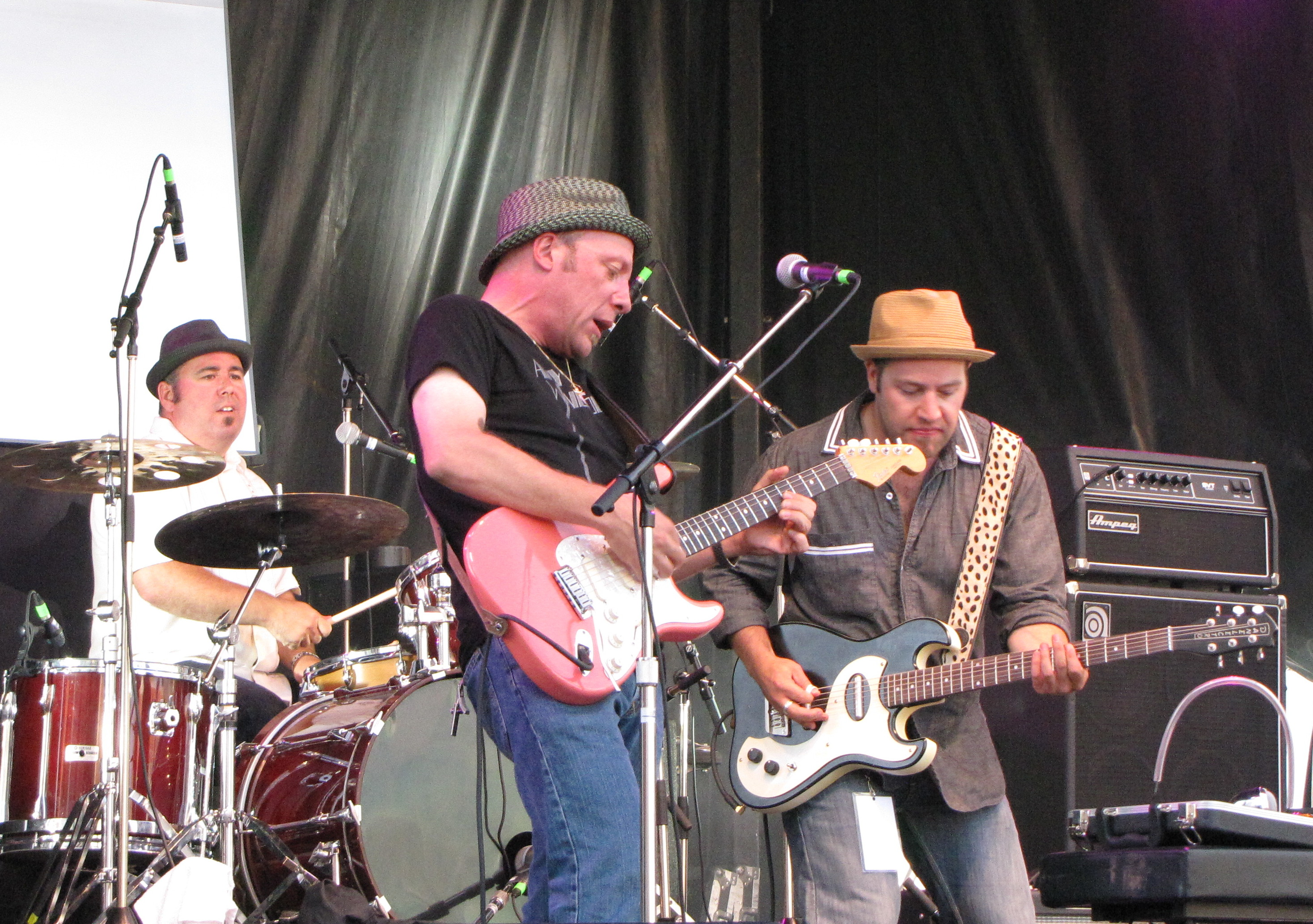
- MonkeyJunk performing at the Kitchener Blues Festival in 2010

Background information
- Origin: Ottawa, Ontario, Canada
- Genre: Blues
- Years active: 2008–present
- Members: Steve Marriner; Matt Sobb; Tony D

MonkeyJunk is a Canadian rock and roll/swamp/blues band, based in Ottawa, Ontario, Canada. The band has won two Juno Awards for Blues Album of the Year. The band won in 2012 for their album To Behold and in 2018 for their latest release Time to Roll.

== History ==
The band was formed in Ottawa, Canada, in 2008. Band members are Steve Marriner on vocals, baritone guitar, harmonica, Hammond organ; Tony D. (Tony Diteodoro) on lead guitar; and Matt Sobb on drums and percussion. Marriner had been playing a weekly solo show at Irene's Pub in Ottawa, frequently inviting guests to join him. An occasionally recurring guest was Tony D and he once asked Sobb to join too but never together. Marriner and D struck up the idea to try a three piece (two guitars, drums and no bass) and since Sobb had been playing with Tony D. for approximately eight years, and before that time with Marriner in another project, he was called to start this new project on the last Sunday of March 2008. The band members are from different age cohorts, with Tony D. and Sobb being respectively twenty-two and twelve years older than Marriner (born 1984).

The band formation does not include a bass player. Such a formation is found in a number of notable classic blues bands, such as Hound Dog Taylor and the HouseRockers. The band's name comes from an interview with Son House, who described the blues as being about love, stating "I'm talking about the blues. I ain't talkin' 'bout monkey junk".

MonkeyJunk has been a frequent winner at the Maple Blues Awards, and the band's album To Behold won the 2012 Juno Award for Blues Album of the Year as did their latest album Time To Roll in 2018.

The band maintains a busy touring schedule, touring across Canada, into the United States and across Europe as well.

== Awards ==
=== Maple Blues Awards ===
- 2013 Songwriter of the year
- 2013 Recording of the year (All Frequencies)
- 2013 Electric act of the year
- 2013 Entertainer of the year
- 2012 Electric act of the year
- 2011 Recording of the year (To Behold)
- 2011 Electric act of the year
- 2010 Electric act of the year
- 2009 Entertainer of the year
- 2009 Electric act of the year

=== Canadian Independent Music Awards ===
- 2014 Blues Artist/Group or Duo of the Year
- 2010 Favourite Blues Artist/Group

=== Juno Awards ===
- 2012 winner Blues album of the year (To Behold)
- 2014 nomination Blues album of the year (All Frequencies)
- 2018 winner Blues album of the year (Time to Roll)

=== Blues Music Awards ===
- 2010 Best New Artist Debut

== Discography ==
- 2016 Time To Roll (Stony Plain)
- 2015 Moon Turn Red (Stony Plain)
- 2014 Tiger in Your Tank (Stony Plain)
- 2013 All Frequencies (Stony Plain)
- 2011 To Behold (Stony Plain)
- 2009 Tiger in Your Tank (Independent)
