= Dawn Tyler Watson =

Canadian blues and jazz singer

Dawn Tyler Watson is a Canadian blues and jazz singer. She is most noted for her 2019 album Mad Love, which won the Juno Award for Blues Album of the Year at the Juno Awards of 2020. Born in Manchester, England, Watson immigrated to Canada with her family in childhood. Raised in Southwestern Ontario, she moved to Montreal to study jazz at Concordia University. She first began performing blues after being invited to contribute to a local compilation album of blues artists, and released her debut album Ten Dollar Dress with her band Dawn Tyler Blues Project in 2001.

In 2004 she had an acting role as a jazz singer in the film Jack Paradise: Montreal by Night (Jack Paradise, Les nuits de Montréal), and performed much of the film's soundtrack. Over the next number of years she regularly collaborated with guitarist Paul Deslauriers, with whom she recorded the albums En Duo (2007) and Southland (2013).

In 2016 she released the solo album Jawbreaker!, and in 2017 she won the International Blues Challenge.
