= Angel Forrest =

- Birth name: Angela Gareth Forrest
- Born: March 11, 1967 (age 58); Montreal, Quebec
- Genres: Folk, Blues, Blues Rock
- Occupation(s): Singer, songwriter, producer
- Years active: 1988–present
- Labels: Ad Litteram, Morningstar prod., Wonderland prod., Consult'Art
- Website: http://www.angelforrest.ca/

Angel Forrest (born March 11, 1967) is a Canadian folk, blues, rock singer, songwriter, producer and JUNO Award nominee. She is the recipient of ten Maple Blues Awards of the Toronto Blues Society in Canada, including eight as Female Vocalist of the Year. She has been recording under the Quebec label Ad Litteram since 2016.

== Biography ==
=== Early life ===
Angela Gareth Forrest was born on March 11, 1967, in Pointe Claire, Quebec, Canada. Her mother was Margaret Joan Ford (Joanne), and her father was Angelo Nichalo. Forrest is of Italian, Irish and Welsh descent. She has two half sisters on her father's side, Mary and Gloria, and one half sister and one half brother on her mother's side – Gail and Robert. Forrest has two daughters, Jazmin Raine MacDonald, (born February 29, 1992) from her first marriage to guitarist Robert John MacDonald (1990–1994) and Dylan Sky Morand-Forrest (born January 30, 1999) whose father is singer-songwriter, Jean-Francois Morand (Moran). Forrest married Denis Coulombe (D. Columbus) in 2007, and they live and work happily together with their dog Freida Love.

=== Career ===
In 1988, Forrest began a musical career which has spanned over three decades – and counting. Her first album, Secondhand Blues, featured several classics. Her tribute show to the legendary Janis Joplin brought Forrest into the public eye. The live performance was immortalized on her Angel Sings Janis Live album.

Her first original album, Here For You, then sold over 30,000 copies and was followed by the other LPs, including her Wonderland Christmas album, the award-winning album Come Alive, as well as Mother Tongue Blues, which won her the Lys Blues Album of the Year in Quebec and was nominated for the Recording of the Year at the 2014 Maple Blues Awards where she also won Songwriter of the year. That same year, Forrest recorded Live Love, her live acoustic album. In 2016, she released Angel's 11, an original concept album with 11 of the best guitar players in the country. For this album Forrest won Producer/Recording of the Year, Songwriter as well as Female Vocalist of the Year at the Maple Blues Awards.

Her live album, Electric Love, topped the charts around the world. The Montreal artist was named Female Vocalist of the Year seven times by the Toronto Blues Society between 2013 and 2021. The 2018 Memphis International Blues Challenge Finalist sings in the whole country, blues and rock spectrum. In November 2019, ready to hit the American market, Forrest released the critically acclaimed album Hell Bent with Grace. This album was nominated for a JUNO Award for Blues Album of the Year in 2020.

Forrest and Denis Coulombe have been songwriting partners from 2005 to present. The two have collaborated with Rob MacDonald on Here For You and Come Alive, Dimitri LeBel Alexandre, on Mother Tongue Blues and Ricky Paquette on Hell Bent With Grace.

== Discography ==
- 2019 : Hell Bent With Grace
- 2018 : Electric Love
- 2016 : Angel's 11
- 2014 : Live Love at the Palace
- 2013 : Mother Tongue Blues
- 2010 : Come Alive
- 2007 : Wonderland
- 2005 : Here For You
- 2001 : Étrange ce qui dérange
- 1997 : Angel Sings Janis Live
- 1996 : Secondhand Blues

== Awards ==
- 2020 : Female Vocalist of the Year, Maple Blues Awards
- 2018 : Female Vocalist of the Year, Maple Blues Awards
- 2018 : Show of the Year (Fan Favourite), Kiosque Edwin-Belanger
- 2017 : Female Vocalist of the Year, Maple Blues Awards
- 2016 : Singer-songwriter of the year, Maple Blues Awards
- 2016 : Producer of the year, Maple Blues Awards
- 2016 : Female Vocalist of the Year, Maple Blues Awards
- 2015 : Female Vocalist of the Year, Maple Blues Awards
- 2014 : Female Vocalist of the Year, Maple Blues Awards
- 2014 : Singer-songwriter of the year, Maple Blues Awards
- 2014 : Female Vocalist of the Year, Lys Blues Awards
- 2014 : Album of the year for Mother Tongue Blues, Lys Blues Awards
- 2013 : Female Vocalist of the Year, Maple Blues Awards
- 2012 : Female artist of the year, Lys Blues Awards
- 2011 : Album of the Year for Come Alive, Lys Blues Awards
