= Angelique Francis =

Canadian blues singer

Angelique Francis is a Canadian blues singer from Ottawa, Ontario. She is most noted as the winner of the Juno Award for Blues Album of the Year at the Juno Awards of 2023, for her album Long River.

A graduate of the music performance program at Carleton University, she released her debut album Kissed by the Blues in 2018.

In addition to her Juno Award, she was also a Canadian Folk Music Award nominee for Contemporary Singer of the Year at the 18th Canadian Folk Music Awards. In 2024 Francis was honoured with a Peter Honeywell Mid-Career Artist Award from the Ottawa Arts Council.
