= Jack de Keyzer =

British-born Canadian musician

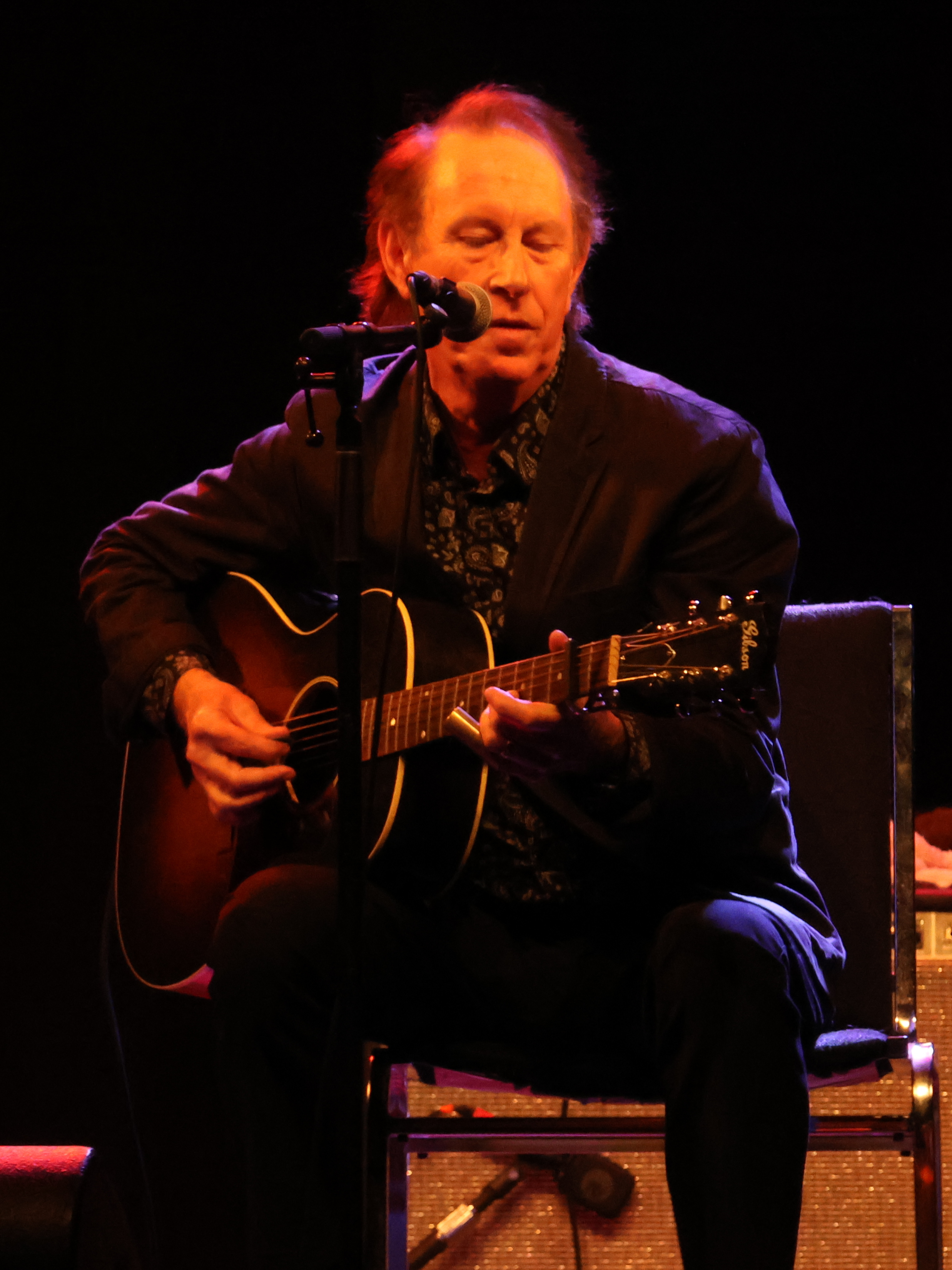
- De Keyzer performing in 2023

Background information
- Born: Jacob de Keijzer; September 13, 1955 (age 71); London, England
- Origin: Toronto, Ontario, Canada
- Genres: Blues, Canadian blues
- Occupations: Guitarist, vocalist, songwriter, producer
- Instrument: Guitar
- Years active: 1970s–present
- Label: blue star records
- Website: Jack de Keyzer

Jack de Keyzer is a British-born Canadian blues guitarist, vocalist, songwriter and producer. He has twice won the Juno Award, Canada's highest musical honour and seven times received Maple Blues Awards, including for Blues Album of the Year in 2000 and the Lifetime Achievement Award in 2001. Real Blues Magazine crowned him Live Act of the Year in 2001 and named him Guitarist of the Year twice.

== Career ==
De Keyzer received Juno Awards for Blues Album of the Year in 2003 and 2010, respectively, for 6 String Lover and The Corktown Sessions. He also won first prize in the 2007 International Songwriting Competition for his song "That's the Only Time".

His career has spanned four decades. He is a former member of Hamilton band The Bopcats – a rockabilly group that released two albums in the 1980s on Attic Records. After leaving The Bopcats, he became one of The Rock Angels, releasing an independent EP in 1983. His solo work began in 1989. His first CD release, Hard Working Man, was produced by Stacey Heydon. The album made a name for de Keyzer in the Canadian blues industry through the successful singles "Blue Train" (Produced by Danny Greenspoon), "That's the Way" and "Nothing In the World". The single "That's the Way" reached No. 13 on Rock Radio.

As a solo artist, he has released eleven CDs and one DVD and has appeared as a session guitarist on hundreds of recordings. As a session guitarist, he worked with Etta James, Otis Rush, John Hammond, Jr., Ronnie Hawkins, Duke Robillard, Robert Gordon, Willy Big Eyes Smith, Bo Diddley, and Blue Rodeo.

De Keyzer's songs have also appeared in video, rock & blues radio charts, other artists' CDs (Prairie Oyster's platinum CD Everyone Knows), TV soundtracks, as well as in films (The Michelle Apartments, My Father's Shoes) and on television (Traders, PSI Factor).

In 2009, de Keyzer received accolades from two very Canadian institutions. First, Prime Minister Stephen Harper's son, Ben, received a guitar lesson from him at the request of First Lady Laureen Harper at the Prime Minister's residence. Later that year, de Keyzer was also named Great Canadian Blues Artist of the Year by CBC radio listeners.

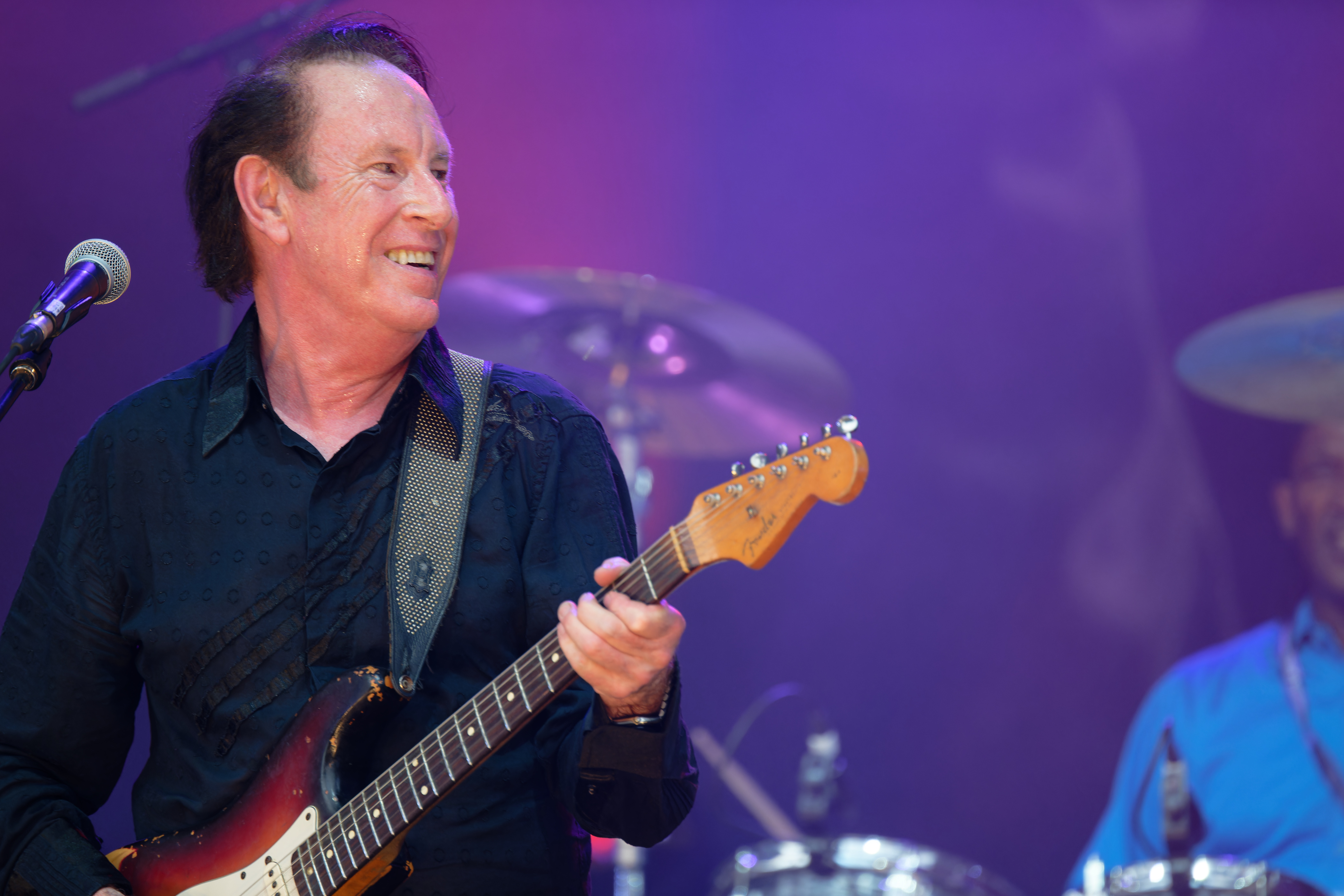
De Keyzer at the Montreal International Jazz Festival, 2024

== Discography ==
- 1981 The Bop Cats kiss goodbye (EP)
- 1981 The Bop Cats
- 1982 The Bop Cats wild Jungle Rock
- 1983 Rock Angels (EP)
- 1986 Lucky one (single)
- 1989 Blue train (single)
- 1990 That's the way (single)
- 1990 Nothing in the world (single)
- 1991 Hard Working Man
- 1994 The way that I love you (single)
- 1994 Wild at Heart
- 1999 Down in the Groove – Jazz Report Award for Blues Album of the Year 2000; Maple Blues Award for Blues Album of the Year 2000
- 2003 6 String Lover – Juno Award for Blues Album of the Year 2003
- 2005 Silver Blues – Durham Region Music Award for Blues Recording of the Year 2005
- 2006 Silver Blues (DVD)
- 2007 Blues Thing – Juno Award nomination for Album of the Year
- 2009 The Corktown Sessions – Juno Award for Blues Album of the Year 2010
- 2012 Electric Love Juno Award nomination for Album of the Year
- 2014 Voodoo Boogie
- 2017 The Best of Jack de Keyzer (Volume One)
- 2018 Checkmate
- 2020 Tribute
- 2023 Solo
