= Steve Strongman =

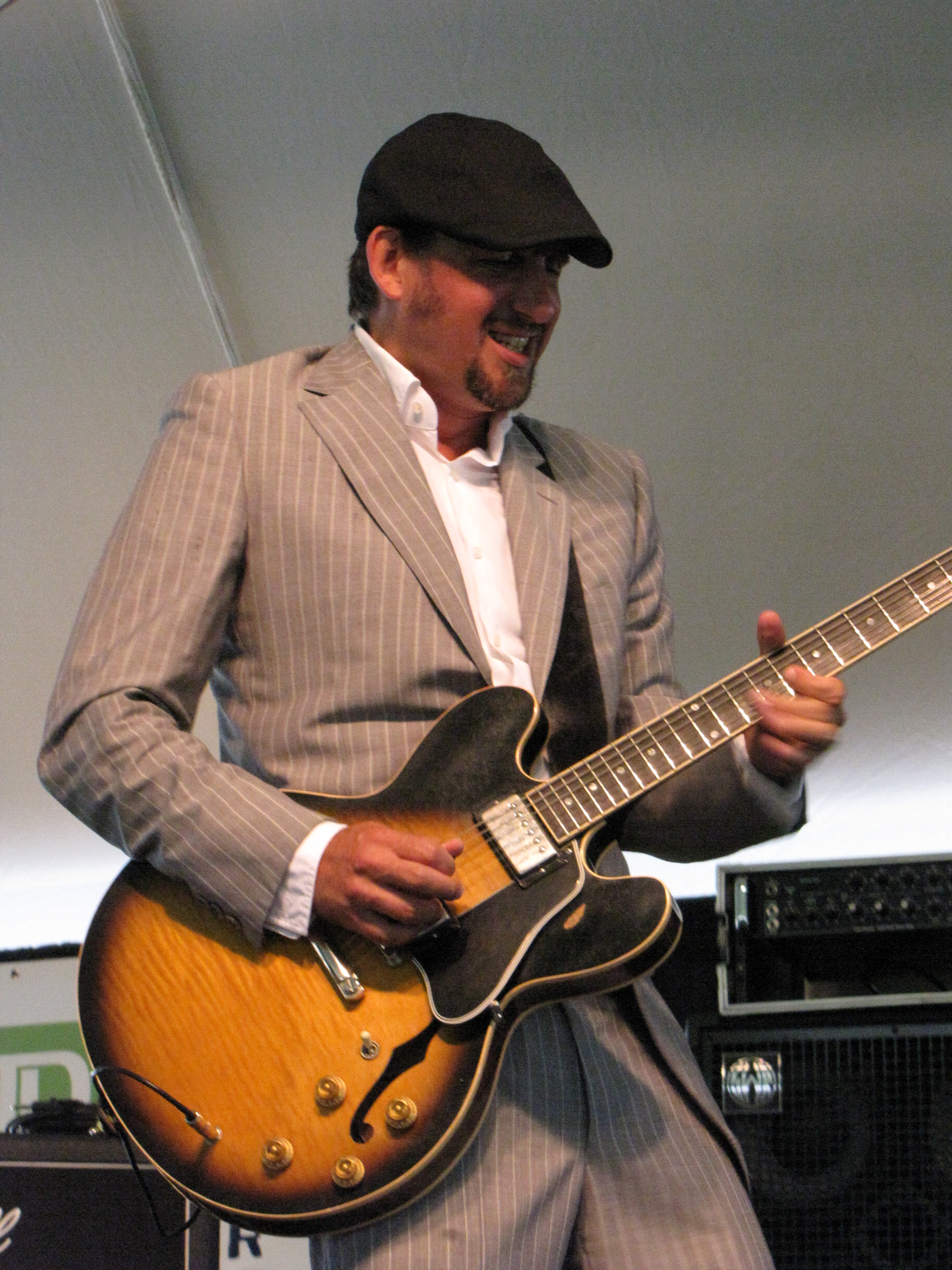
- Strongman performing in August 2010

Background information
- Genres: Blues, Canadian blues, blues rock
- Occupations: Musician, guitarist, songwriter, vocalist, record producer
- Instrument: Guitar
- Years active: 1990s–present
- Website: www.stevestrongman.com

Steve Strongman is a Canadian blues guitarist, singer and songwriter. He has released several blues albums including, Honey, Blues in Colour, Live at the Barn, A Natural Fact, Let Me Prove it to You and No Time Like Now.

== Career ==
Strongman originally from Kitchener, Ontario started playing guitar at age 16. He studied under blues veteran Mel Brown, later playing country, rock, and pop. He has performed with Canadian musicians Roy Clark, Jeff Healey, and Tal Bachman. He subsequently formed Plasticine with co-frontman Rob Szabo. Their video "No One" received extensive play on Much Music. They released two albums, 1999's self-titled CD and 2001's Public Address System. They appeared on national television on Open Mike with Mike Bullard, but folded shortly after when their label collapsed. Following the band's demise, Strongman opted to be the lead guitar player for Kazzer, giving him the opportunity to tour in the United States and Europe.

Strongman relocated to Hamilton, Ontario in 2007 releasing Honey, his first blues album. The album, consisted of eleven tracks including nine originals, earned good reviews and earned him a Maple Blues Award nomination as well as four nominations at the 2007 Hamilton Music Awards. He toured with his band playing blues clubs across the country, with stops at the Montreal Jazz Festival, the Ottawa Blues Festival and the Tremblant International Blues Festival. He opened for Buddy Guy in Hamilton in 2008. He also supported Sonny Landreth on his only Canadian date in Toronto, Ontario.

== Awards and recognitions ==
- 2019 International Blues Challenge Winner, Best Guitarist, Solo/Duo
- 2018 Juno Award Nominee, Blues Recording of the Year, No Time Like Now
- 2015 Juno Award Nominee, Blues Recording of the Year, Let Me Prove It To You
- 2013 Juno Award Winner, Blues Recording of the Year, A Natural Fact
- 2012 Maple Blues Award, Recording of the Year, A Natural Fact
- 2012 Maple Blues Award, Songwriter of the Year
- 2012 Maple Blues Award, Guitarist of the Year
- 2011 Maple Blues Award, Guitarist of the Year
- 2009 Mel Brown Blues Award
- 2009 Hamilton Music Award, Blues Album of the Year, Blues in Colour

== Discography ==
- 2022 The Strongman Blues Remedy
- 2019 Tired of Talkin'
- 2017 No Time Like Now
- 2014 Let Me Prove It to You
- 2012 A Natural Fact
- 2010 Live at the Barn
- 2009 Blues in Colour
- 2007 Honey

== Audio visual ==
- 2010 Live at the Barn
