= Spencer Mackenzie =

Canadian blues-rock guitarist and singer-songwriter

Background information
- Born: Spencer Mackenzie
- Origin: Southern Ontario, Canada
- Genres: Blues, blues rock
- Occupations: Guitarist, singer-songwriter
- Instruments: Guitar, vocals
- Years active: 2016–present
- Label: Gypsy Soul Records
- Website: www.spencermackenzie.ca

Spencer Mackenzie is a Canadian blues and blues-rock guitarist, singer, and songwriter from Southern Ontario. He received a Juno Award nomination for Preach to My Soul and won the Maple Blues Award for New Artist of the Year. His fourth studio album, Empty Chairs, was released in 2026.

== Early life and education ==
Mackenzie grew up in Ridgeway, Ontario located in the Niagara region. He received his first guitar at the age of five and began singing blues at fifteen. His early musical development was shaped by local blues musicians, including Brant Parker, Elton Lammie, and John Navarroli. Mackenzie made his first public blues performance on April 15, 2015, at Donnelly’s Pub in Thorold during an open mic hosted by Parker.

He developed an interest in blues artists such as Stevie Ray Vaughan and B.B. King. He studied music at Mohawk College in Hamilton, graduating with honours.

In 2016, he opened for Texas guitarist Chris Duarte at Donnelly’s Pub, where Duarte described him as “the next Canadian Lion.” Mackenzie also performed with musicians such as Jack de Keyzer, Tony “Wild T” Springer, Chuck Jackson, Brent Johnson, JP Soars, and Dave Rave. He appeared at the Canal Bank Shuffle Festival and was sponsored by the festival to perform at the International Blues Challenge youth showcase in Memphis.

Mackenzie won the Grand River Blues Society Youth Legacy Challenge, becoming the Youth Legacy Representative at the Kitchener Blues Festival. He was also a top-six finalist in the Toronto Blues Society New Talent Search and received scholarships to attend the Fernando Jones Blues Camp in Chicago and the Grand River Blues Society Blues Camp.

== Career ==
=== Early recordings and recognition ===
Mackenzie released his debut album, Infected with the Blues, in 2016. The record included original compositions and blues standards such as "Goodbye Lucille". His second album, Cold November (2018), was released through Gypsy Soul/Fontana North/Universal and featured contributions from producer Dean Malton and engineer Eddie Kramer.

He performed throughout Southern Ontario early in his career, including venues and festivals in the Niagara region, Hamilton, Toronto, and Kitchener. He represented the Toronto Blues Society at the International Blues Challenge youth showcase in Memphis and received recognition at the Niagara Music Awards.

=== Preach to My Soul ===
Mackenzie’s third studio album, Preach to My Soul, was released in 2022 on Gypsy Soul Records. Produced by Ross Hayes Citrullo, the album blends traditional blues with blues-rock influences. It earned a Juno nomination for Blues Album of the Year and a Maple Blues Award.

Following the album’s release, Mackenzie toured in Canada and Europe, performing at events such as the Montreal International Jazz Festival, Festival d'été de Québec, and Trois-Rivières en Blues.

=== Empty Chairs ===
Mackenzie’s fourth album, Empty Chairs, was released on February 20, 2026, through Gypsy Soul Records. Produced by Ross Hayes Citrullo, the album features Miles Evans Branagh on piano and organ, Stacey Shopsowitz and Steve Pelletier on bass, Adam Canon and Matt Burns on drums, and background vocals by Sandra Bouza, Chantel Williams, and Citrullo.

== Musical style and influences ==
Mackenzie’s music draws on classic blues while incorporating contemporary blues-rock elements. His stated influences include Stevie Ray Vaughan, B.B. King, Ray Charles, Freddie King, and Muddy Waters.

== Awards and honours ==
- Nominations: Rising Star and Music Video of the Year, Niagara Music Awards (2012)
- Rising Star award at the Niagara Music Awards (2013)
- Blues Artist of the Year, Niagara Music Awards
- New Artist of the Year, Maple Blues Awards
- Toronto Blues Society Talent Search winner
- Juno Award nomination for Blues Album of the Year for Preach to My Soul (2023)

== Discography ==
- Infected with the Blues (2016)
- Cold November (2018)
- Preach to My Soul (2022)
- Empty Chairs (2026)
