= Michael Jerome Browne =

Canadian musician

Michael Jerome Browne is a Canadian blues singer and guitarist, most noted as a multiple Juno Award nominee.

Born in South Bend, Indiana, he moved to Montreal, Quebec, in childhood with his family, and began playing shows as a blues guitarist in his teens. He was later a singer and guitarist in the Stephen Barry Band before launching his own solo career with a self-titled album released in 1998.

He received Juno nominations for Blues Album of the Year at the Juno Awards of 2000 for his self-titled debut album, the Juno Awards of 2002 for Drive On, the Juno Awards of 2016 for Sliding Delta, the Juno Awards of 2020 for That's Where It's At, and the Juno Awards of 2024 for Gettin' Together, and Roots & Traditional Album of the Year – Solo at the Juno Awards of 2005 for Michael Jerome Browne and the Twin River String Band.

He has also been a three-time Canadian Folk Music Award winner, winning Solo Artist of the Year at the 4th Canadian Folk Music Awards in 2008 and the 8th Canadian Folk Music Awards in 2012, and Traditional Singer of the Year at the 11th Canadian Folk Music Awards in 2015.

== Discography ==
- Michael Jerome Browne - 1998
- Drive On - 2001
- Michael Jerome Browne and the Twin River String Band - 2004
- Double - 2007
- This Beautiful Mess - 2009
- The Road Is Dark - 2011
- Sliding Delta - 2015
- Can't Keep a Good Man Down - 2018
- That’s Where It's At! - 2019
- Gettin' Together - 2023
