= Matt Andersen =

Canadian singer-songwriter

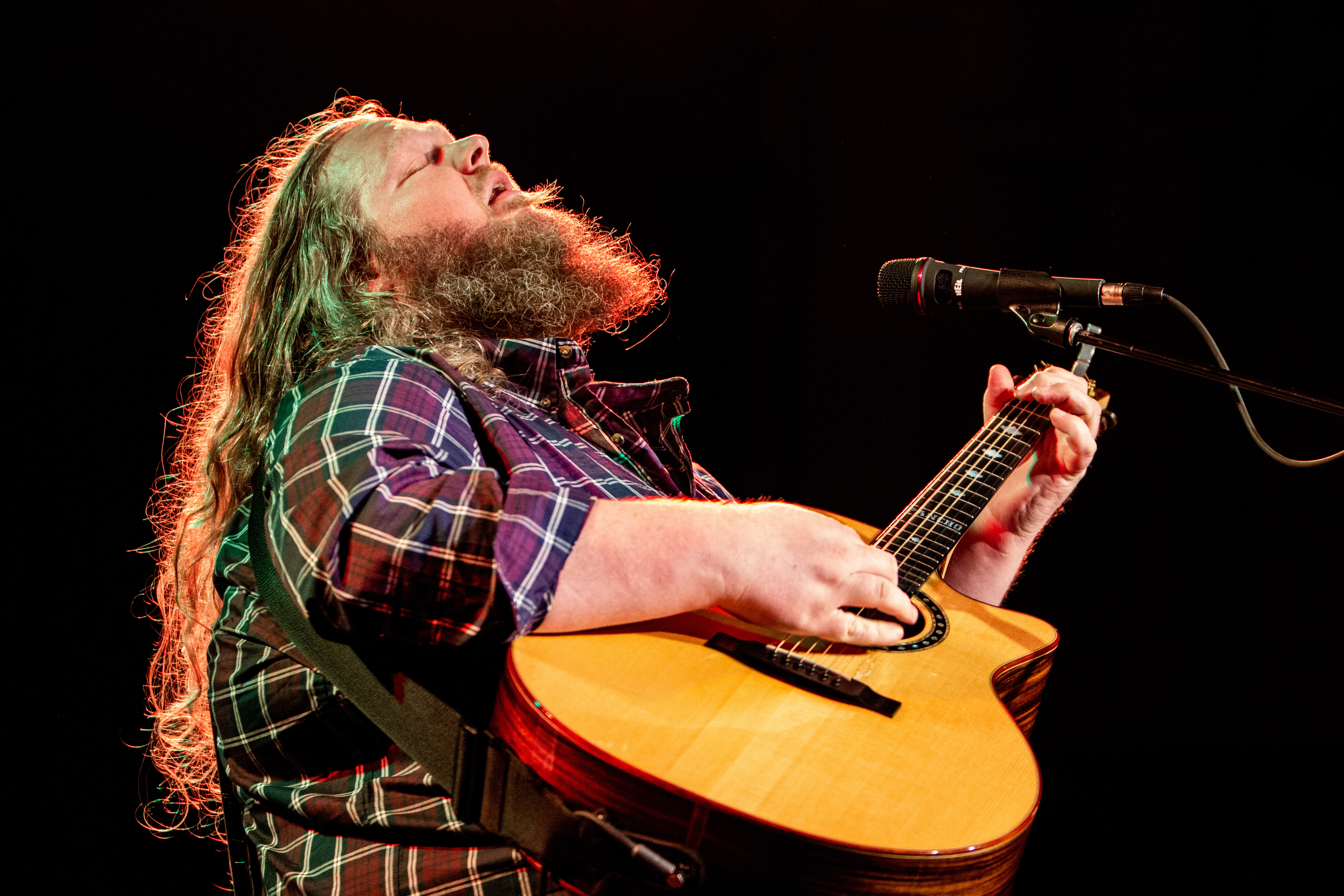
- Andersen performing in Paris, Ontario in 2022

Background information
- Origin: Perth-Andover, New Brunswick
- Genre: Blues
- Occupations: Guitarist, singer-songwriter
- Instrument: Guitar
- Years active: 2002–present
- Labels: Sonic Records, True North Records
- Member of: Flat Top
- Website: www.stubbyfingers.ca

Matt Andersen is a Canadian blues guitarist and singer-songwriter from Perth-Andover, New Brunswick. He is a Juno Award nominee. His musical career started in 2002 with the New Brunswick band Flat Top.

== Career ==
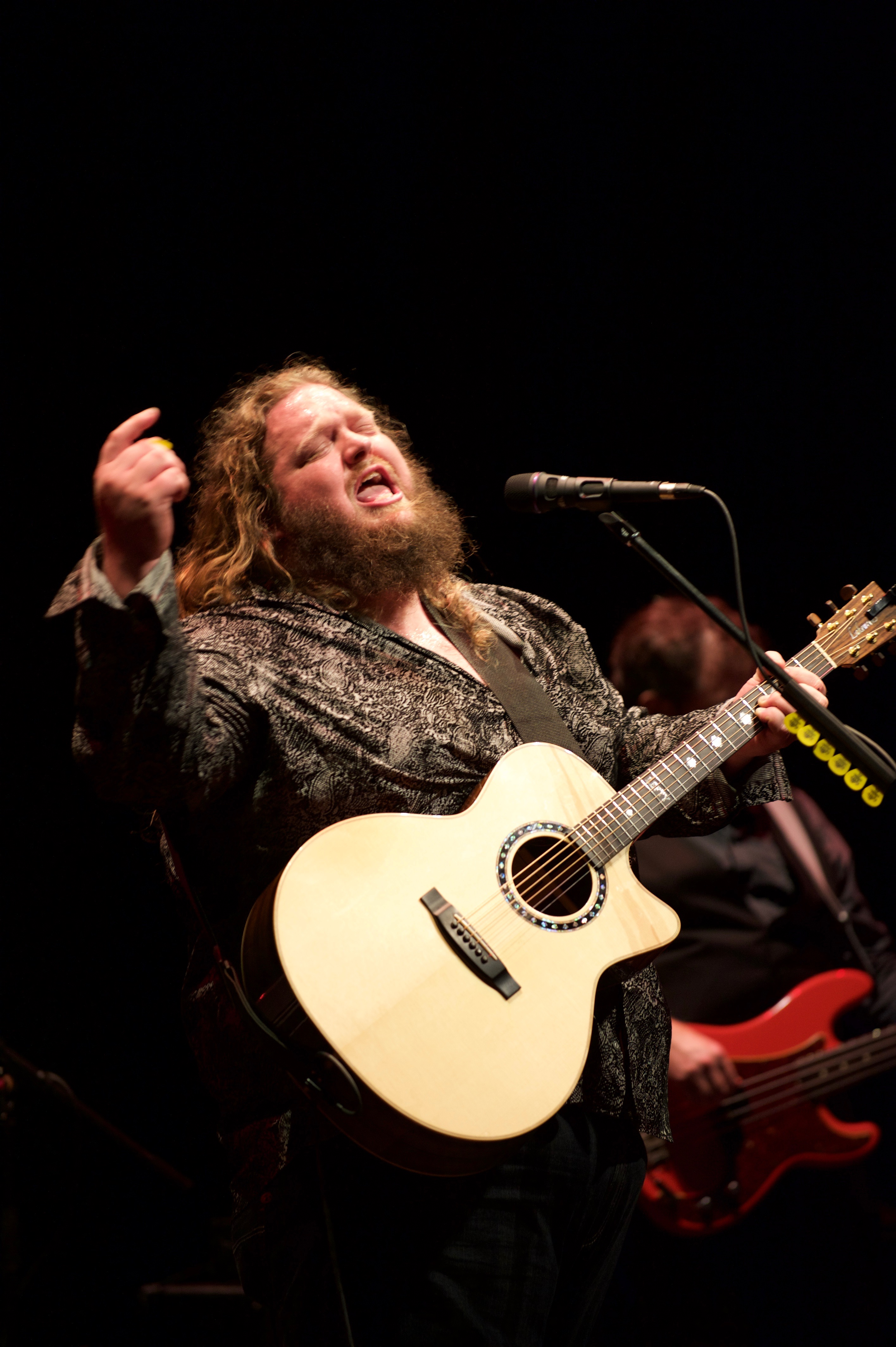
Andersen performing at the National Arts Centre in Ottawa, 2016

In addition to headlining major festivals, clubs and theatres throughout North America, Europe and Australia, Andersen has shared the stage and toured with Bo Diddley, Buddy Guy, Gregg Allman, Tedeschi Trucks Band, Randy Bachman, Little Feat, April Wine, America, Loverboy, Jonny Lang, Serena Ryder, and Beth Hart.

Andersen played in over 200 live performances in 2009, including his fourth UK tour. He won two 2009 East Coast Music Association (ECMA) Awards: Male Solo Artist of the year, Blues Recording of the year for "Something In Between" and recorded a new studio album (Piggyback) with harmonica player Mike Stevens. He performed at several of Stuart McLean's Vinyl Cafe shows across Canada, starting in 2009 and continuing into 2011.

On 25 January 2010, Andersen won the top prize for a duo/individual in the Memphis, Tennessee, International Blues Challenge, beating artists from 11 other countries and five continents – the first Canadian to win in the event's 26-year history. Sponsored by the Harvest Jazz & Blues Festival in Fredericton, his prize included festival gigs in America, France and Italy, a slot on the Legendary Rhythm and Blues Cruises, and a cash award. More honors came in January 2011, as he was named the Maple Blues Awards Entertainer of the Year and Acoustic Act of the Year.

He was nominated for four 2011 East Coast Music Association (ECMA) Awards: Male Solo Recording, Blues Recording, Fan's Choice Entertainer of the Year, and DVD of the Year. He won the 2011 ECMA awards for Blues Recording of the Year for Piggyback, and the Konica Minolta Male Solo Recording of the Year for the same album. In 2012, Andersen won three Maple Blues Awards, followed by a 2013 European Blues Award for Best Solo/Acoustic performer. Since the release of Weightless in 2014, Andersen has received a Juno Award nomination for Roots & Traditional Album of the Year, a CIMA Road Gold award, and a Maple Blues Award for Male Vocalist of the Year.

In 2020, Andersen's 2016 "Let's Get Back" hit was covered by Rainman on the UK Government's COVID-19 "Test and Trace" TV Advert to emphasise how COVID-19 testing enables life to "get back to where we used to be".

In 2024, Matt Andersen won The Entertainer of the year, Male Vocalist of the year, Recording/Producer of the year and Songwriter of the year awards at the 27th Maple Blues Awards.

In 2025 he contributed a cover of Joel Plaskett's "Natural Disaster" to the Plaskett tribute album Songs from the Gang.

In April 2025, he released his latest album The Hammer and The Rose

== Discography ==
One Size Never Fits (2004, self-issued)

1. "If I Can't Have You"
2. "One Size Never Fits"
3. "Too Long Since"
4. "Lay Down With Me"
5. "Just Don't Call Me Your Friend"
6. "It Hurts Me Too"
7. "Red House"

Solo at Sessions (2005, self-released)

1. "Leavin' Blues"
2. "Ain't No Sunshine"
3. "When My Angel Gets the Blues"
4. "Play the Fool for You"
5. "One Size Never Fits"
6. "Rollin' Home"
7. "Have You Got the Blues"
8. "If I Can't Have You"
9. "Tell Me"
10. "My Old Friend the Blues"

Live at Liberty House (2006, self-released)

1. Intro
2. Key to the Highway
3. I'm On Fire
4. Long Black Veil
5. Angel From Montgomery
6. Every Day I Get The Blues
7. Magnolia
8. Country Roads
9. Steamroller
10. I Shall Be Released
11. Mojo
12. Wagon Wheel
13. Louise

Second Time Around (2007)

1. "Leavin' Blues" 3:45
2. "I Play The Fool For You" 7:20
3. "When My Angel Gets The Blues" 4:47
4. "If I Can't Have You" 2:43
5. "One Size Never Fits" 3:00
6. "Ain't No Sunshine" 4:43
7. "Just Don't Call Me Your Friend" 2:50
8. "Lay Down With Me" 3:42
9. "Tell Me" 4:13
10. "Have You Got The Blues" 6:02
11. "Rollin' Home" 3:23
12. "My Old Friend The Blues" 4:22
13. "Hidden Track" 7:22

Something in Between (2008)

1. Come By
2. Something in Between
3. Working Man Blues
4. So Gone Now
5. Stay With Me
6. Better Man Blues
7. Lonesome Road
8. Wrote a Song for Everyone
9. Broken Man
10. Tell Me
11. How I Wish
12. Baby Come Back Home
13. Bold and Beaten

Piggyback (with Mike Stevens) (2009)

1. "I Wanna Be A Float Plane" 4:29
2. "The Way You Move" 3:35
3. "Hold Me With Both Hands" 3:19
4. "Livin' In Sarnia" 6:53
5. "Devil's Bride" 4:04
6. "Going Home" 3:22
7. "Storms Rollin' In" 5:27
8. "Better Days" 8:16
9. "I'll Tell You a Story" 4:53
10. "Blue Celtic Rose" 3:14
11. "Working My Way Home To My Girl" 2:55
12. "You're a Best Seller Baby" 4:20

Live at the Phoenix Theatre (2009)

1. "Better Man Blues" 5:12
2. "One Size Fits All" 3:17
3. "Play The Fool For You" 7:11
4. "Something In Between" 4:09
5. "When My Angel Gets The Blues" 5:26
6. "Bold and Beaten" 4:42
7. "If I Can't Have You" 3:41
8. "To Leave What Should Be Left Alone" 5:03
9. "Working Man Blues" 4:13
10. "So Gone Now" 7:52
11. "Devil's Bride" 5:05
12. "Have You Got The Blues" 7:46
13. "Round And Round" 4:57

Coal Mining Blues (2011)

1. "I Don't Wanna Give In" 3:06
2. "Fired Up" 3:46
3. "Coal Mining Blues" 5:15
4. "Lay It On The Line" 3:19
5. "Baby I'll Be" 4:03
6. "Make You Stay" 5:28
7. "Home Sweet Home" 4:11
8. "Heartbreaker" 5:11
9. "She Comes Down" 6:34
10. "Willie's Diamond Joe" 4:01
11. "I Work Hard For The Luxury" 4:48
12. "Feel Like Going Home" 3:58

Spirit of Christmas (2011)

1. "Hobo Christmas Train" 3:06
2. "Blue Christmas" 2:47
3. "Ol' Nick and Rudy" 2:55
4. "My Little Country Church At Christmas Time" 4:13
5. "The Lonely Shepherd" 4:03
6. "O Holy Night" 4:28
7. "Country Christmas Blues" 3:26
8. "Little Toy Trains" 2:12
9. "Miss Mary Christmas" 3:25
10. "That Spirit of Christmas" 5:19
11. "Silent Night" 3:18
12. "Go Tell It On The Mountain" 3:09
13. "Auld Lang Syne" 5:20

Push Record: The Banff Sessions (with Mike Stevens) (2011)

1. "Snow Plow"
2. "She Loves It All"
3. "Pawnshop"
4. "The Mountain"
5. "Last Letter Home"
6. "Canadian Winter Blues"
7. "Stay In The Race"
8. "Little Things"
9. "Share The Load"
10. "That Girl is Like a Train"
11. "Push Record"

Weightless (2014)

1. "I Lost My Way" 4:16
2. "My Last Day" 5:28
3. "So Easy" 4:34
4. "Weightless" 4:32
5. "Alberta Gold" 3:33
6. "Let's Go To Bed" 2:59
7. "The Fight" 3:36
8. "Drift Away" 3:43
9. "Let You Down" 2:54
10. "City of Dreams" 3:09
11. "Between the Lines" 4:36
12. "What Will You Leave" 4:07

Honest Man (2016)

1. "Break Away"
2. "The Gift"
3. "Honest Man"
4. "I'm Giving In"
5. "Quiet Company"
6. "Let's Get Back"
7. "All the Way"
8. "Last Surrender"
9. "Who Are You Listening To?"
10. "One Good Song"

Live at Olympic Hall (2018)

1. "Weightless"
2. "Alberta Gold"
3. "I Don't Wanna Give In"
4. "What Will You Leave"
5. "Coal Mining Blues"
6. "Ophelia"
7. "My Last Day"
8. "Going Down"
9. "Devils Bride"

Halfway Home By Morning (2019)

1. "What Would Your Mama Say" 4:40
2. "Free Man" 3:06
3. "Something to Lose (feat. Amy Helm)" 4:48
4. "The Bed I Made" 3:38
5. "Give Me Some Light" 4:32
6. "Better Than You Want" 4:49
7. "Gasoline" 2:35
8. "Over me" 4:31
9. "Help Yours Elf" 3:54
10. "Long Rider" 3:58
11. "Take Me Back" 4:14
12. "Been My Last" 3:45
13. "Quarter on the Ground (A Song for Uncle Joe)" 3:36

House to House (2022)

1. "Other Side of Goodbye"
2. "Lookin' Back at You"
3. "Let Me Hold You"
4. "Time for the Wicked to Rest"
5. "House to House"
6. "See This Through"
7. "All We Need"
8. "Peace of Mind"
9. "Burning Lights"
10. "Raise Up Your Glass"
11. "Coal Mining Blues"
12. "People Get Ready"

Matt Andersen & The Big Bottle Of Joy (2023)

1. "Let It Slide"
2. "So Low, Solo"
3. "Golden"
4. "How Far Will You Go"
5. "Aurora"
6. "Miss Missing You"
7. "What’s On My Mind"
8. "Keep Holding On"
9. "Rollin’ Down The Road"
10. "Only An Island"
11. "Hands Of Time"
12. "Shoes"

The Hammer & The Rose (2025)

1. "The Hammer & The Rose"
2. "Hold On To Me"
3. "Wayaheadaya"
4. "Stay Home with You"
5. "Countin' Quarters"
6. "The Cobbler (Good for My Sole"
7. "Tonight Belongs To You"
8. "You're Here To Stay"
9. "Magnolia"
10. "Always Be Your Son"
