= Carlos del Junco =

Cuban-Canadian harmonica player (born 1958)

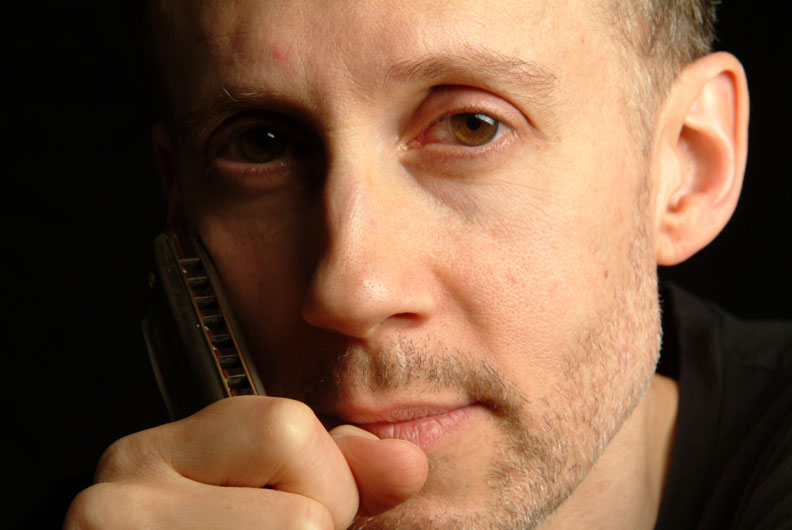

Background information
- Born: May 17, 1958 (age 67); Havana, Cuba
- Genres: Blues, jazz
- Occupation: Musician
- Instrument: Harmonica
- Years active: 1990s–present
- Label: NorthernBlues
- Website: carlosdeljunco.com

Carlos del Junco (born May 17, 1958) is a Cuban-Canadian harmonica player.

== Career ==
Del Junco was born in Cuba and moved to Canada with his family in 1959. He started to play harmonica when he was fourteen. He graduated from Ontario College of Art where he majored in sculpture.

He plays a ten-hole diatonic harmonica using an "overblow" technique developed by Howard Levy of Béla Fleck and the Flecktones.

In the 1980s, Del Junco performed with Eyelevel, Ontario College of Art Swing Band, and for six years with the rhythm and blues group the Buzz Upshaw Band. In 1990, he formed the blues/jazz fusion band the Delcomos. He has recorded with Marcel Aymar, Cassandra Vasik, and Oliver Schroer.

In addition to leading his band the Blue Mongrels, he has worked with Kevin Breit, Bruce Cockburn, Holly Cole, and Kim Mitchell. He wrote music for Dry Lips Oughta Move to Kapuskasing, a play by Tomson Highway that was produced in 1991. At the Hohner World Harmonica Championship in Germany in 1999, he won two gold medals, one each in the blues and jazz categories. In November of that year he released his first album.

Accompanied by guitarist Jimmy Bowskill, he recorded the album Blues Etc. (2016) in his living room with a laptop computer.

== Awards and honors ==
- Harmonica Player of the Year (eight times), Maple Blues Awards, Toronto Blues Society
- Blues Musician of the Year, Jazz Report magazine, 1996
- Gold Medals (2), Hohner World Harmonica Championship, Germany, 1999
- Best Blues Album nomination, Juno Awards, 1999
- Best Blues Award, NOW magazine, 2007

== Discography ==
- Blues (1993) with Bill Kinnear
- Big Road Blues (1995) with Thom Roberts
- Just Your Fool (1996)
- Big Boy (1999)
- Up and at 'Em (2001)
- Blues Mongrel (2005)
- Steady Movin' (2008)
- Mongrel Mash (2011)
- Blues Etc. (2016) with Jimmy Bowskill
