= Rita Chiarelli =

Canadian blues singer

Background information
- Born: Canada
- Genres: Blues
- Occupation: Singer
- Website: ritachiarelli.com

Rita Chiarelli is a Canadian blues singer. She has been called "the goddess of Canadian blues" by Shelagh Rogers at CBC Radio One.

== Biography ==
Born and raised in Hamilton, Ontario, Chiarelli began performing in Ronnie Hawkins' band in the early 1980s. She subsequently spent several years in Italy. When she returned to Canada, she quickly attracted the attention of film director Bruce McDonald, who included her "Have You Seen My Shoes?" on the soundtrack to his 1989 film Roadkill. Chiarelli and Colin Linden subsequently recorded a cover of Bob Dylan's "Highway 61 Revisited" for McDonald's 1991 film Highway 61, and Chiarelli released her debut album the following year on Stony Plain Records.

Her albums Just Getting Started and Breakfast at Midnight were both nominated for the Juno Award for Best Blues Album.

== Discography ==
=== Solo ===
- Road Rockets (1992)
- Just Getting Started (1995)
- What a Night (1997)
- Breakfast at Midnight (2001)
- No One to Blame (2004)
- Cuore: The Italian Sessions (2006)
- Uptown Goes Downtown... Rita Chiarelli with the Thunder Bay Symphony Orchestra (2008)
- Sweet Paradise (2009)
- Music From The Big House Soundtrack (2011)

=== Compilation inclusions ===
- Saturday Night Blues: 20 Years (CBC, 2006)
