= Canadian blues =

Music genre or scene

- Stylistic origins: Blues; Chicago blues; electric blues; jump blues; blues rock
- Cultural origins: Canada
- Typical instruments: Electric guitar; acoustic guitar; piano; Hammond organ; harmonica; bass guitar; upright bass; drum; saxophone; vocals; trumpet; trombone

Local scenes
- Toronto; Ottawa

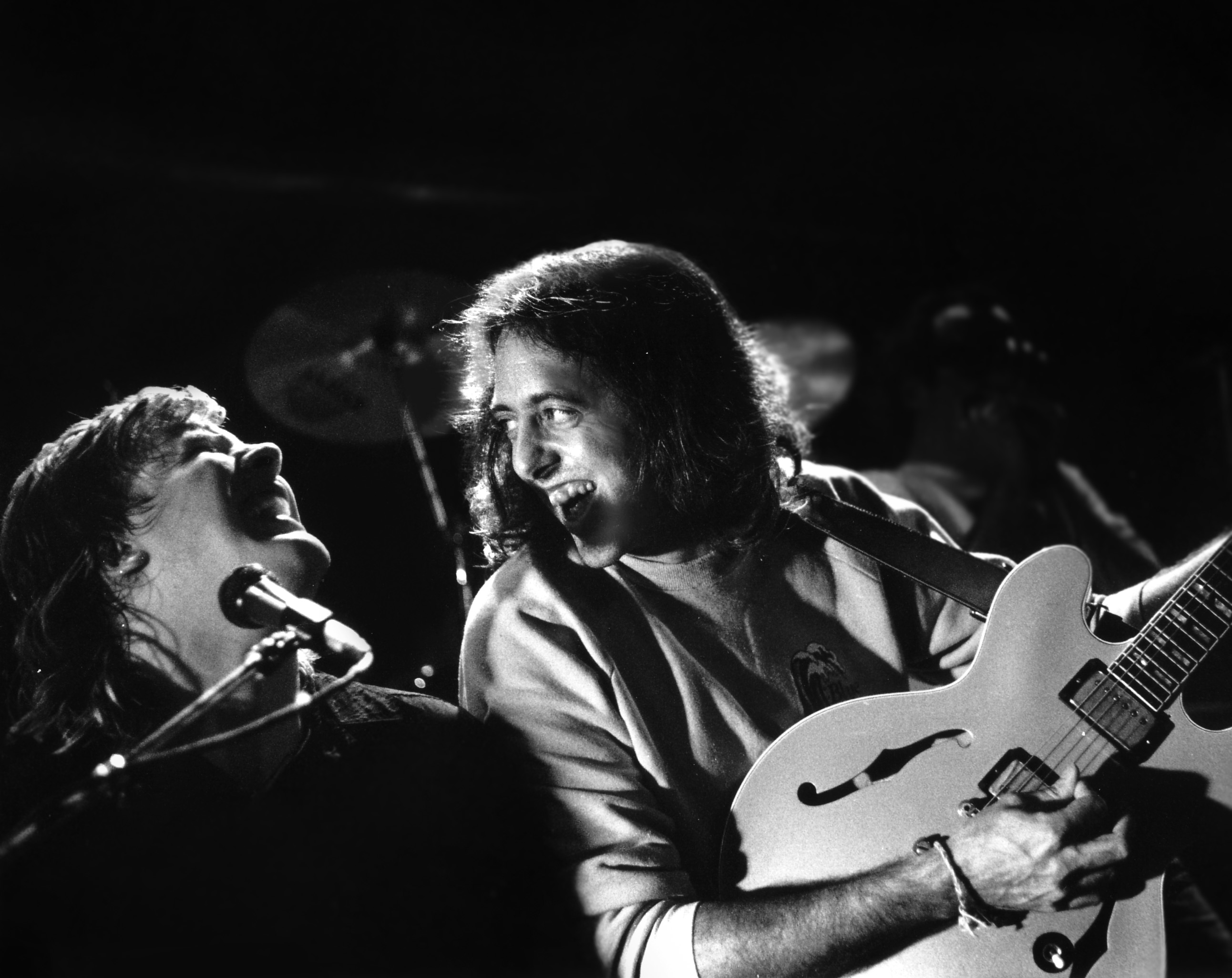
Canadian blues guitarists and singers Jeff Healey and Tom Lavin at a live show.

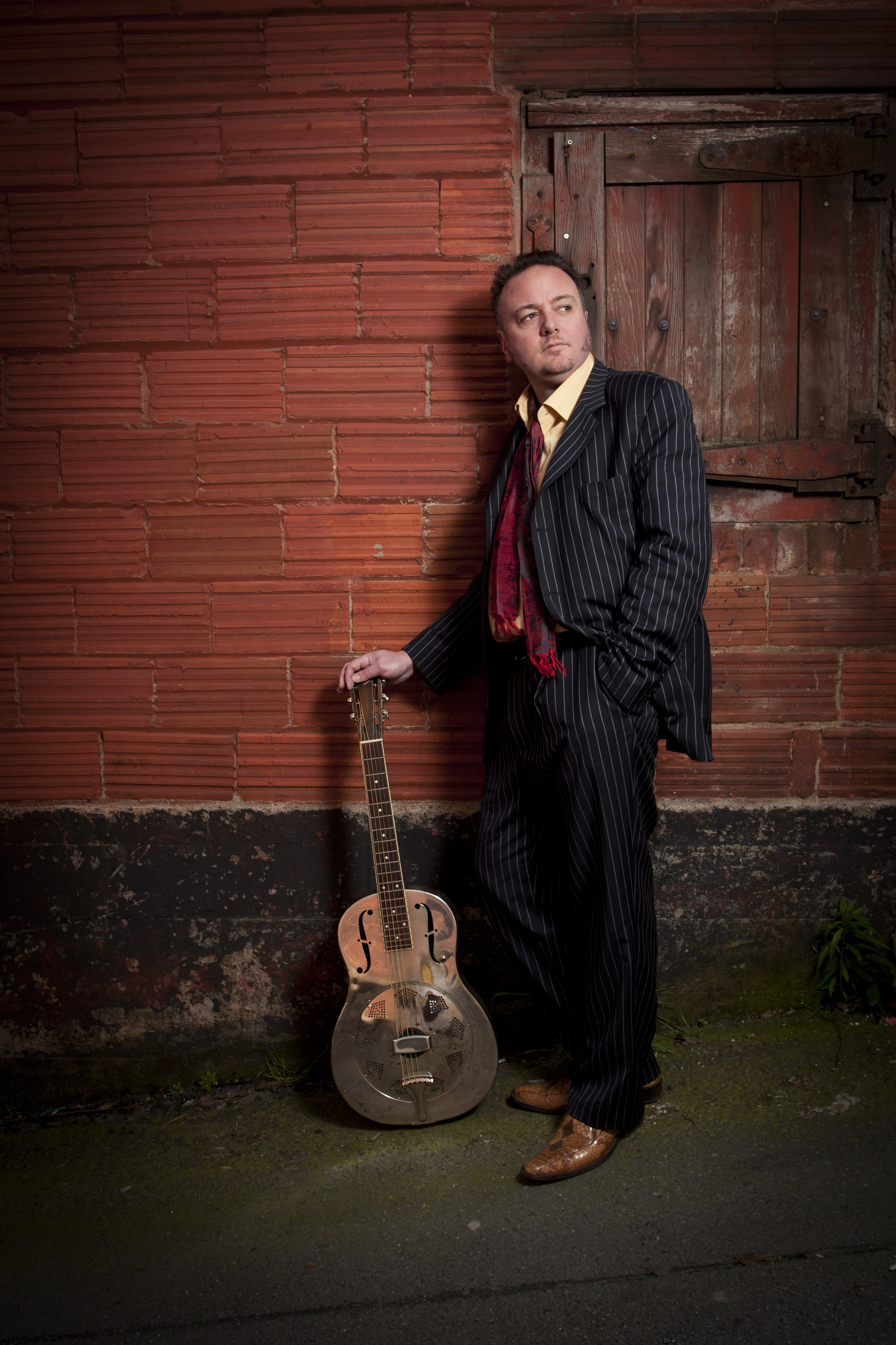
Canadian blues singer/guitarist David Gogo in 2011.

Canadian blues is the blues and blues-related music (e.g., blues rock) performed by blues bands and performers in Canada. Canadian blues artists include singers, players of the main blues instruments: guitar (acoustic and electric), harmonica ("blues harp"), keyboards (piano and Hammond organ), bass and drums, songwriters and music producers. In many cases, blues artists take on multiple roles. For example, the Canadian blues artist Steve Marriner is a singer, harmonica player, guitarist, songwriter and record producer.

Due to Canada's long shared border with the birthplace of the blues, the United States, there has always been collaboration and contact between Canadian blues artists and their US counterparts. Top Canadian blues artists perform at major US blues bars and festivals and travel to the US to play and record with influential US blues artists. Similarly, US blues bands routinely play in Canadian clubs and blues festivals, and perform and record with Canadian blues artists. For example, Canadian blues guitarist/singer JW-Jones has invited the US bluesman Kim Wilson (lead singer for The Fabulous Thunderbirds) to Canada to play with JW Jones' band and so that Wilson could record with Jones and act as record producer on one of Jones' mid-2000s albums.

There are hundreds of local and regionally based Canadian blues bands and performers which perform mainly in small venues in their home city or town. A much smaller number of Canadian bands and performers have achieved national or international prominence, due to the sales performance of their recordings, acclaim from blues music reviewers and performances at major festivals in Canada, the US, and Europe. These notable bands and performers are supported by a broader Canadian "blues scene" that also includes city or regional blues societies, blues radio shows, blues festivals, blues clubs and informal blues "jam sessions".

== Origins ==
Due to Canada's proximity to the United States (there is a huge shared border), and to the fact that most of the Canadian population lives close to the border, many US blues artists have played in Canadian towns and cities. As well, many Canadian musicians and bands have been able to play in US towns, particularly Canadians who live near US cities close to the border, such as Detroit and Chicago. These two elements have given Canadian blues musicians a substantial opportunity to be directly influenced by US artists. Canadian blues is based on the major US blues styles, such as Chicago Blues and Mississippi Blues. The proximity of the two countries also facilitates collaborative projects featuring artists from both countries. For example, the Canadian bluesman JW-Jones had his third album, My Kind Of Evil (2004), produced by the US artist Kim Wilson (singer and harmonica player for The Fabulous Thunderbirds), and subsequent albums included collaborations with US saxophonist David "Fathead" Newman and US blues artists such as Little Charlie Baty, Junior Watson, Richard Innes, and Larry Taylor. Canadian harp player and band leader David Rotundo has visited many of the key US blues regions, which greatly influenced his musical development.

== Nationally or internationally prominent artists ==
A small number of Canadian blues bands and artists have achieved national or international prominence by touring across Canada, the US, or Europe, and releasing recordings that have received critical or audience acclaim in Canada and abroad. The performers below are listed according to the decade during which they first achieved national or international prominence.

=== 1950s-1970s ===
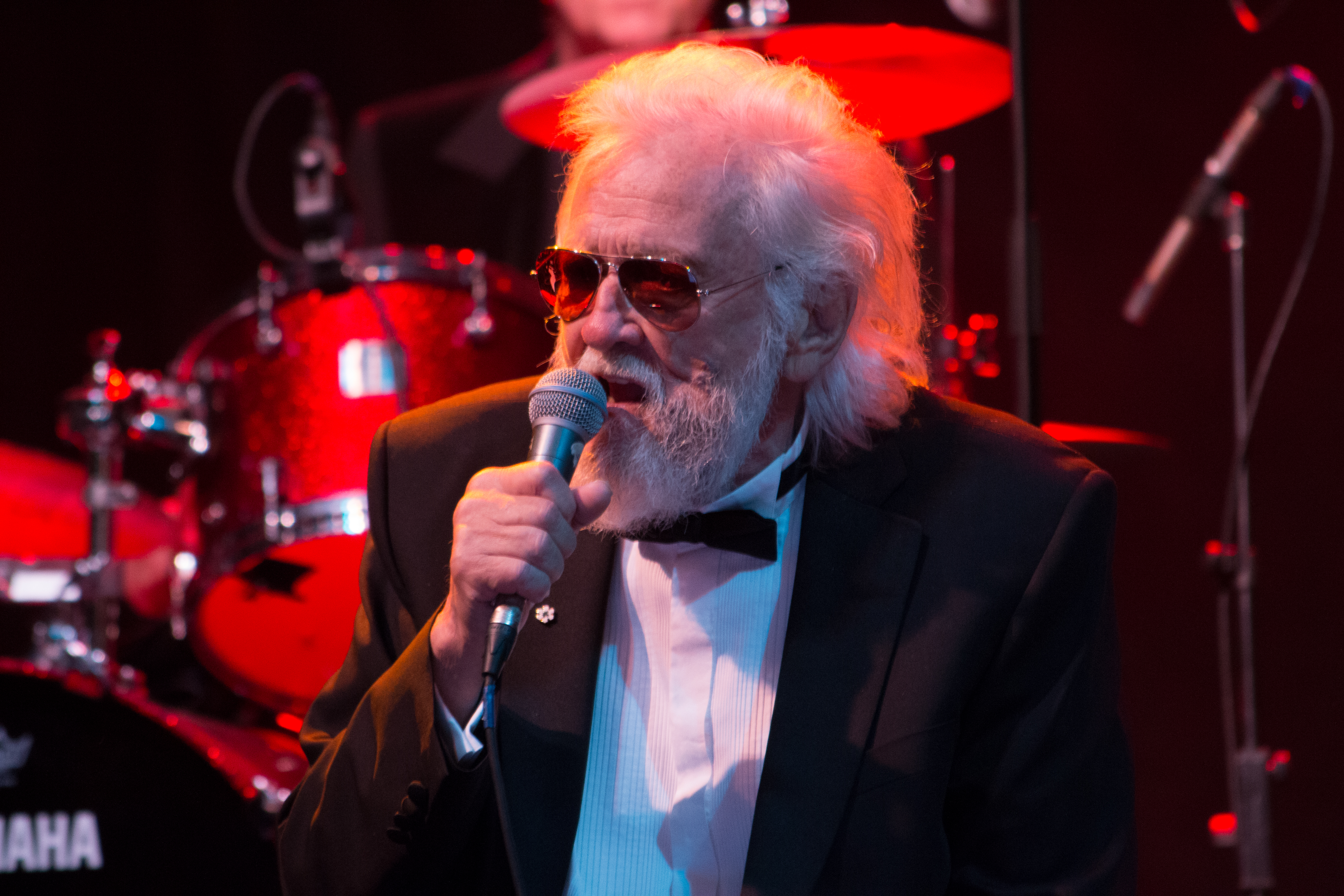
Ronnie Hawkins

In late 1950s, US-born rockabilly pioneer Ronnie Hawkins (1935–2022) came to Canada, where he became a key player in the 1960s rock and blues scene in Toronto. 4 October 2002 was declared "Ronnie Hawkins Day" by the city of Toronto when Hawkins was inducted into Canada's Walk of Fame, and he was inducted into the Canadian Music Industry Hall of Fame at the Canadian Music Industry Awards in 2004. His pioneering contribution to rockabilly has also been recognized by the Rockabilly Hall of Fame. His 1984 LP, 'Making It Again', earned him a Juno Award for Country Male Vocalist.

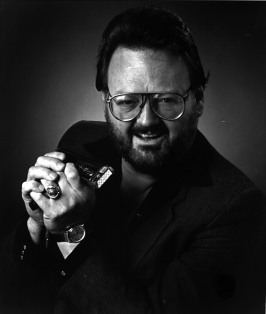
"King Biscuit Boy"

Richard Newell (1944–2003), who performed under the nickname "King Biscuit Boy", was a vocalist, arranger, songwriter, slide guitarist, and harmonica player. He released his first solo recording, "Official Music", in 1970, and it charted on the US Billboard album charts. A native of Hamilton, Ontario, he had learned his craft playing in blues rock bands and backing up Ronnie Hawkins, who gave him his nickname. In 1980, his release entitled "Mouth of Steel" appeared on the "Red Lightning" record label from England. In 1987, his recording "King Biscuit Boy AKA Richard Newell" was nominated for a Juno Award in the Best Roots and Traditional category.

In the 1970s, the Downchild Blues Band was formed in Toronto by Donnie Walsh. The band has released fourteen albums and performed in thousands of venues over three decades of continual cross-Canada touring. The Downchild Blues Band still performs regularly. Another important Canadian bluesman who became notable during the 1970s was Norman "Dutch" Mason (born February 19, 1938, in Lunenburg, Nova Scotia, died December 23, 2006, in Truro, Nova Scotia). Mason was a Canadian singer, guitarist, and pianist who was nicknamed the "Prime Minister of the Blues" in the 1970s for his prominent role in the Canadian blues scene. His albums included Dutch Mason Trio at the Candlelight from 1971 (Paragon ALS-263) and Janitor of the Blues from 1977 (Solar SAR-2020). In 1991 he released I'm Back (Stony Plain SPCD-1169). He was inducted into the Canadian Jazz and Blues Hall of Fame, and in 2005, he became a Member of the Order of Canada. That same year, son Garrett Mason won a Juno Award for Best Blues album.

=== 1980s-1990s ===
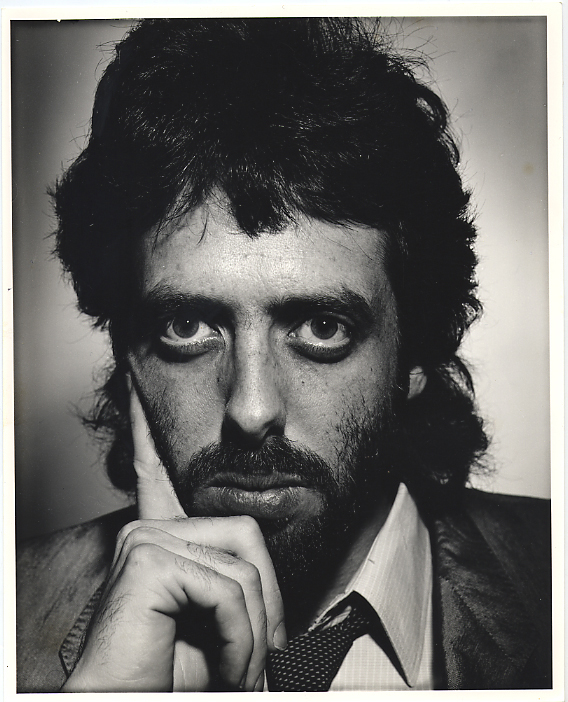
Tom Lavin, leader of the Powder Blues band.

In 1980, the Powder Blues, led by Tom Lavin, had double platinum sales for their debut album 'Uncut', which also had four top ten songs. The band won a Juno for 'Best New Group'. The second album, Thirsty Ears, released on Capitol Records had platinum sales, and a top 5 single. In 1983, Powder Blues played at the Montreux Jazz Festival in Switzerland and North Sea Jazz Festival in the Netherlands. In 1986, the band won the W.C. Handy Award for blues in Memphis, Tennessee for 'Best Foreign Blues Band'. Studio albums and touring continued from the 1990s until the present day.

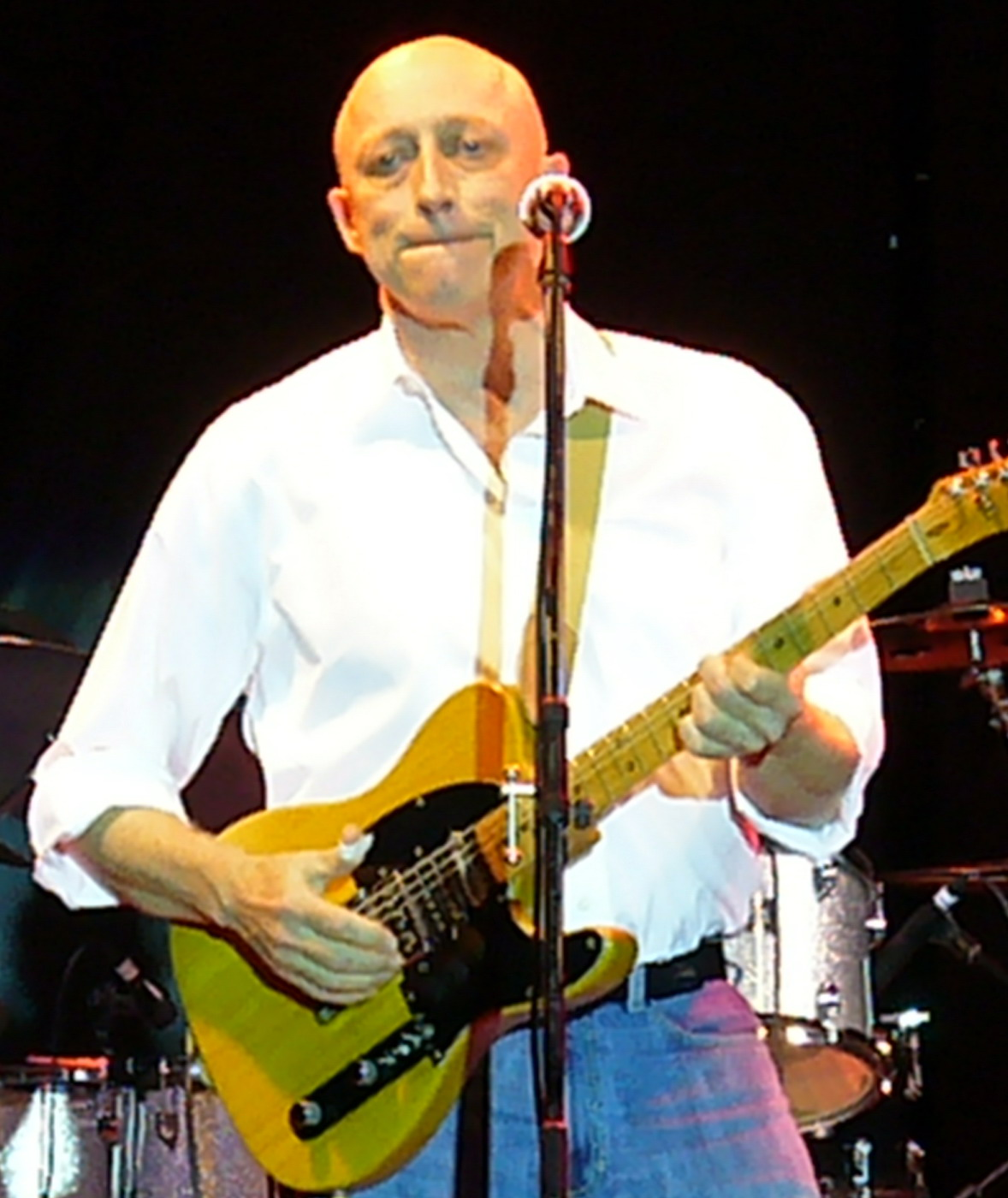
David Wilcox performing at the 2008 Fergus Truck Show

In the early 1980s, David Wilcox became a well-known songwriter, singer, and guitar player in the blues and roots scene. His many years of performing have given him five gold albums and numerous awards. Wilcox played the college campus circuit in the early 1980s, then signed a recording contract with EMI Music Canada. Five of his albums with EMI achieved Gold status.

Johnny V Mills is a Calgary blues guitarist who has been nominated for several Juno awards, including on collaboration recordings with Richard Newell and Amos Garrett. In 1986 Elder Chicago blues performer Eddy "The Chief" Clearwater hired Johnny as a sideman. In 1989 Johnny released ten original songs titled Roosters and Hens and won a Juno Award in 1991 for his song "I Need A Woman". In 1998, Johnny toured with Clearwater in the US, Europe, and South America. In 1999, he joined Billy Branch's band "The Sons of Blues". He released an independent live CD in 2001 titled "Mustard and Relics" and in 2005 he recorded and released the CD "Agnostically Eclectic". Westcoast Blues Review stated that "...Johnny V Mills is the true heavyweight champion of the Great Blues North" and praised him as the "...best blues songwriter in Canada".

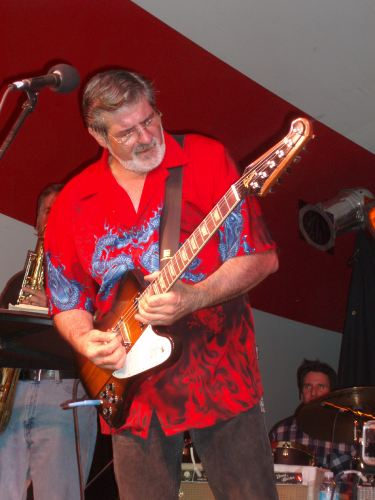
Johnny V Mills at South Country Fair in 2005

In the mid-1980s, singer and blues guitarist Jeff Healey caught the public's attention with his unconventional lap-top style of playing electric guitar and emotional guitar soloing. Healey, who lost his sight to a form of cancer called retinoblastoma, was praised by B.B. King for "his virtuoso technique" and by Stevie Ray Vaughan, who said that Healey would "revolutionize guitar playing." The Jeff Healey Band was formed in 1985, and released a debut album that achieved platinum sales in the US, in part due to the hit single "Angel Eyes". The Jeff Healey Band won a Juno Award for Canadian Entertainer of the Year and two Grammy nominations, and performed a cameo role in the movie "Road House". Healey was a jazz radio host for the CBC and CJRT-FM, a blues club owner, and performer (acoustic guitar and trumpet) in traditional jazz groups. Healey died on March 2, 2008, due to cancer.

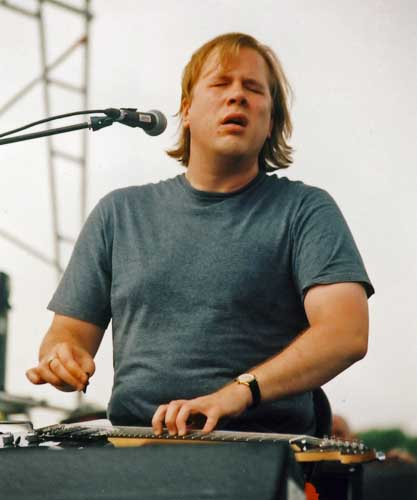
The late Canadian bluesman Jeff Healey playing at a 2002 festival; note his unconventional lap-top style of playing the electric guitar.

In the late 1980s, vocalist, guitarist, and songwriter Colin James (whose full name is Colin James Munn) (born in 1964) first attracted attention with his blues-rock songs. He has released nine studio albums that blend the blues, rock, and swing genres. As well, he has won six Juno Awards: 1989 - Most Promising Male Vocalist of the Year; 1991 - Single of the Year ("Just Came Back"); 1991 and 1996 - Male Vocalist of the Year; 1998 - "Best Blues Album" for National Steel; and 1999 - Best Producer. He was also a guest on the JW-Jones Blues Band album "My Kind of Evil" produced by Kim Wilson of The Fabulous Thunderbirds.

Ontario blues band Fathead was formed in 1992. In 2014 they released their ninth album "Fatter Than Ever" featuring new guitarist Papa John King. Over the years they have been nominated four times for The Juno Awards' "Blues Album of The Year", winning twice (1998 "Blues Weather", 2008 "Building Full Of Blues"). In addition, Fathead has been nominated or won a total of 77 Maple Blues Awards.

=== 2000s-2010s ===
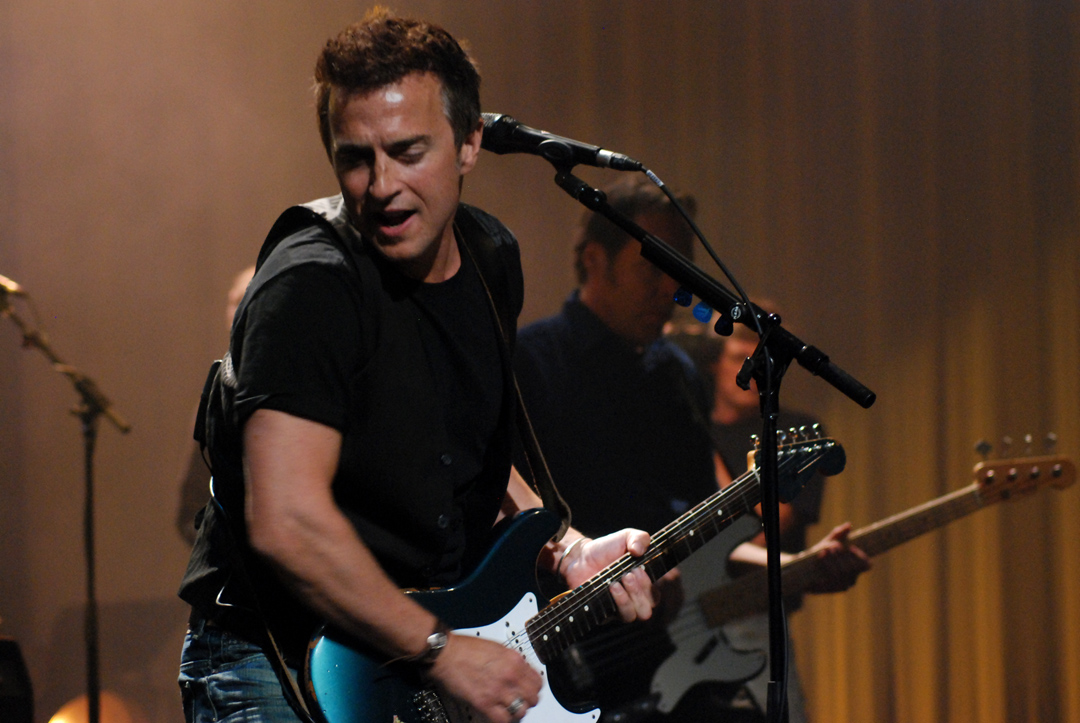
Colin James in 2009.

In the 2000s (decade) and the 2010s, Canadian blues performers with international blues careers included singer-guitarists Jack de Keyzer, Sue Foley, JW-Jones, Roxanne Potvin and David Gogo.

Jack de Keyzer is a blues guitarist, singer and songwriter who has performed at many major blues festivals and is a winner of Canada's Juno award in 2003 for his album 6 String Lover and again in 2010 for his album "The Corktown Sessions". His band has toured throughout Canada, the US, Mexico and Europe including events such as the BB King Blues Festival. Other awards include a 2001 award from Jazz Report magazine; a "Live Act of the Year" award in 2001 from Real Blues magazine; and Guitarist of the Year awards in 1999 & 2002.

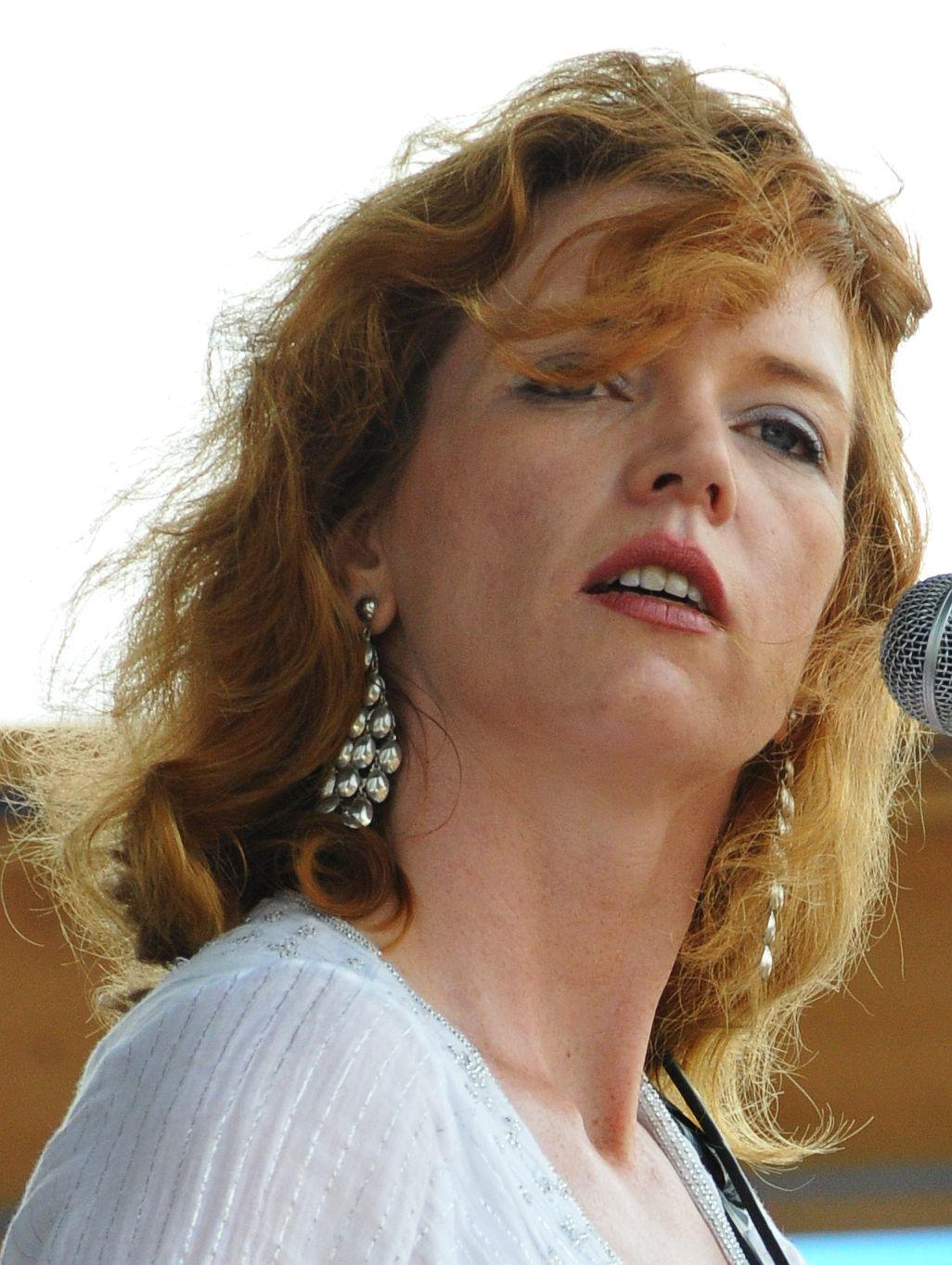
Singer and guitarist Sue Foley.

Sue Foley is a blues/roots rock guitarist, songwriter and vocalist. She has ten studio CDs, five from Austin-based blues label Antone's, three from the New York City independent Sanachie Records and a live CD on Ruf Records from Germany and Justin Time in Canada. In 2000 she won a Juno Award, the Canadian equivalent to the Grammy for Best Blues Album for her CD "Love Comin' Down", and in 2002 she was the SOCAN songwriter of the year. In addition, she was awarded the Trophée de blues de France in 2000 (Best female Guitarist), 2001 (Best Female Guitarist), and 2003 (Best Female Guitarist).

JW-Jones is a blues guitarist, singer, and bandleader born in 1980 who was signed to the Canadian NorthernBlues Music label. His band, the JW-Jones Blues Band has recorded five albums. Known as "Canada's Top Touring Blues Act" due to the number of performances per year, he has played at blues festivals and clubs in 13 countries and four continents including Canada, US, Europe, Australia, and Brazil. His band's third album, My Kind Of Evil (2004), was produced by multi-Grammy nominee Kim Wilson (singer for The Fabulous Thunderbirds), and features fellow Canadian singer Colin James on two tracks. In 2006, the band had their fourth release with NorthernBlues Music, Kissing in 29 Days, featuring saxophonist David "Fathead" Newman (who played with Ray Charles' band for 12 years). The 2008 album Bluelisted included as guests the guitarist Little Charlie Baty and Junior Watson, drummer Richard Innes and upright bass player Larry Taylor (former bassist with Canned Heat and bassist on many Tom Waits albums). The liner notes were written by US blues radio show host and actor Dan Aykroyd.

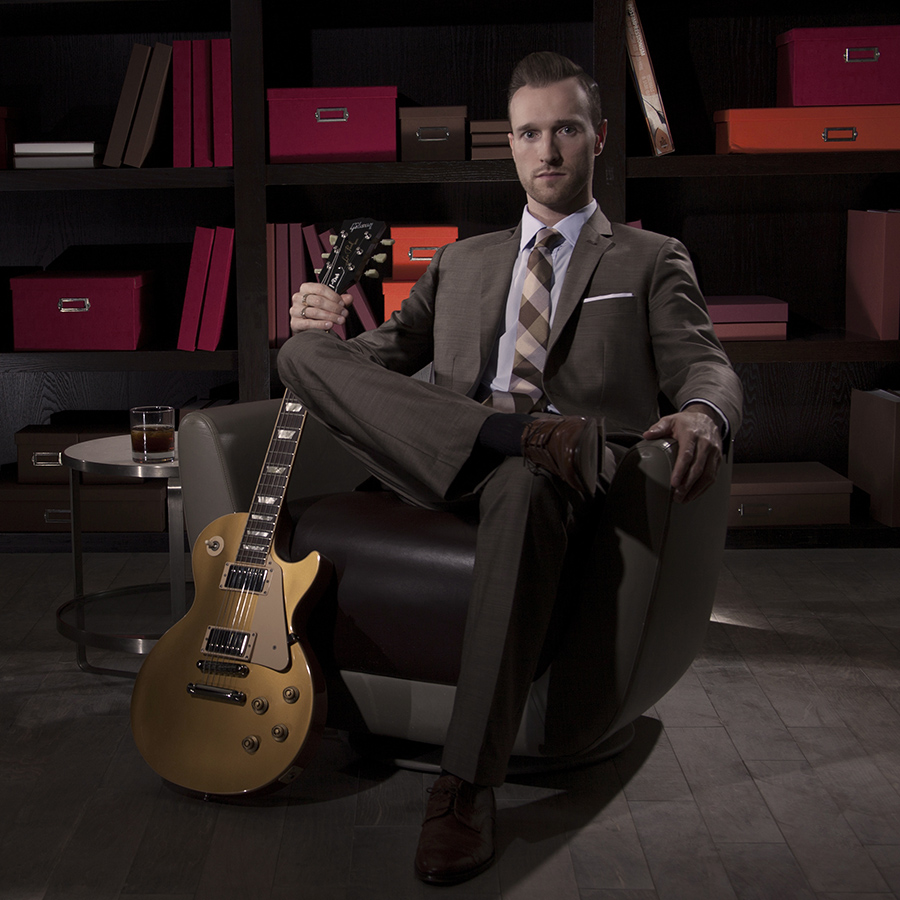
Guitarist and singer JW-Jones pictured in 2012.

David Gogo is a Canadian blues guitarist and singer from Nanaimo, British Columbia, who is currently signed to the Cordova Bay Records label. After a European tour supporting The Fabulous Thunderbirds, Gogo signed a solo record deal with EMI Records. He soon after performed at the 1991 Montreux Jazz Festival. Gogo's first album was released in 1994 and led to a JUNO nomination for Best New Solo Artist in 1995. Several successful European tours and American blues festival appearances followed, as well as the albums "Change of Pace" (a rock-oriented blues album) and "Dine Under The Stars" (a live rock-oriented blues album) in 1999, "Bare Bones" (an acoustic blues album) in 2000, "Halfway To Memphis" (2001), "Skeleton Key" (2002), and "Live At Deer Lake" (2004). Gogo was named Musician of the Year at the 1999/2000 West Coast Music Awards. His eighth album, entitled "Vibe" (2004), is a compilation of original songs written with Tom Wilson, Craig Northey (Odds/Colin James) and John Capek, and features Jeff Healey on the track 'She's Alright'. His 2006 album, "Acoustic", his 2011 album, "Soul Bender", and his 2013 album, "Come On Down", were each nominated for the JUNO Award for Blues Album of the Year. "Soul Bender" received the 2012 Western Canadian Music Award for Blues Recording of the Year. Gogo has also been awarded the CBC Saturday Night Blues' Great Canadian Blues Award for a lifetime contribution to the blues in Canada, and has twice been named Maple Blues Guitarist of the Year.

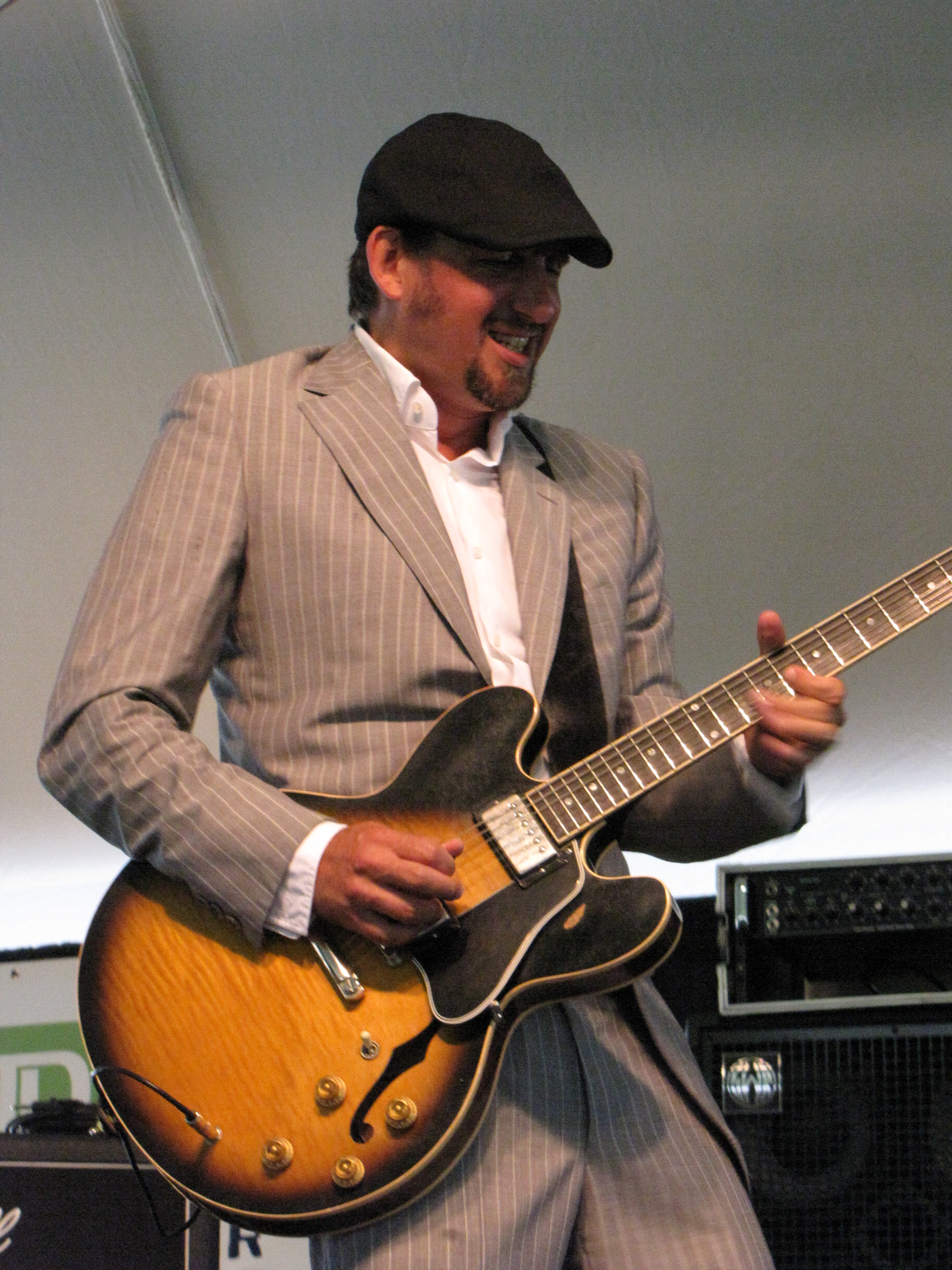
Steve Strongman

Roxanne Potvin (born March 31, 1982) is a bilingual Gatineau, Quebec-based singer, blues guitarist, songwriter and vocalist. Born in Regina, Saskatchewan, Canada, she has performed for clubs, festivals, and special events across Ontario and farther afield. She has performed in France at a major festival in 2007 and she has played the Toronto Women's Blues Review show twice (most recently in November 2007 at Massey Hall in Toronto) and in 2008 she was nominated as "Female Vocalist of the Year" at the Maple Blues Awards.

Several other performers who garnered attention in the 2000s are Steve Marriner, an Ottawa-based harp player, guitarist and singer who fronts the Juno-winning band MonkeyJunk, David Rotundo, a Toronto-based blues vocalist, songwriter and harmonica player who won the CBC/Galaxie "Rising Star" award from Canada's national public broadcaster for his second CD, "Blues Ignited", Richard Carr is a French-Canadian singer-guitarist who has performed at a number of blues festivals in Canada and blues venues in the US., James King and the Jackhammer Blues Band, aka "Canada's Blues King" who reformed in 2009 and have been featured at B.B.King's Blues Club in Memphis with 'Blind Mississippi' Morris, at numerous blues festivals in Canada and the US, as well as being named to The Yale Nightlife's Top 10 Canadian Blues Artists of All Time;

== Labels ==
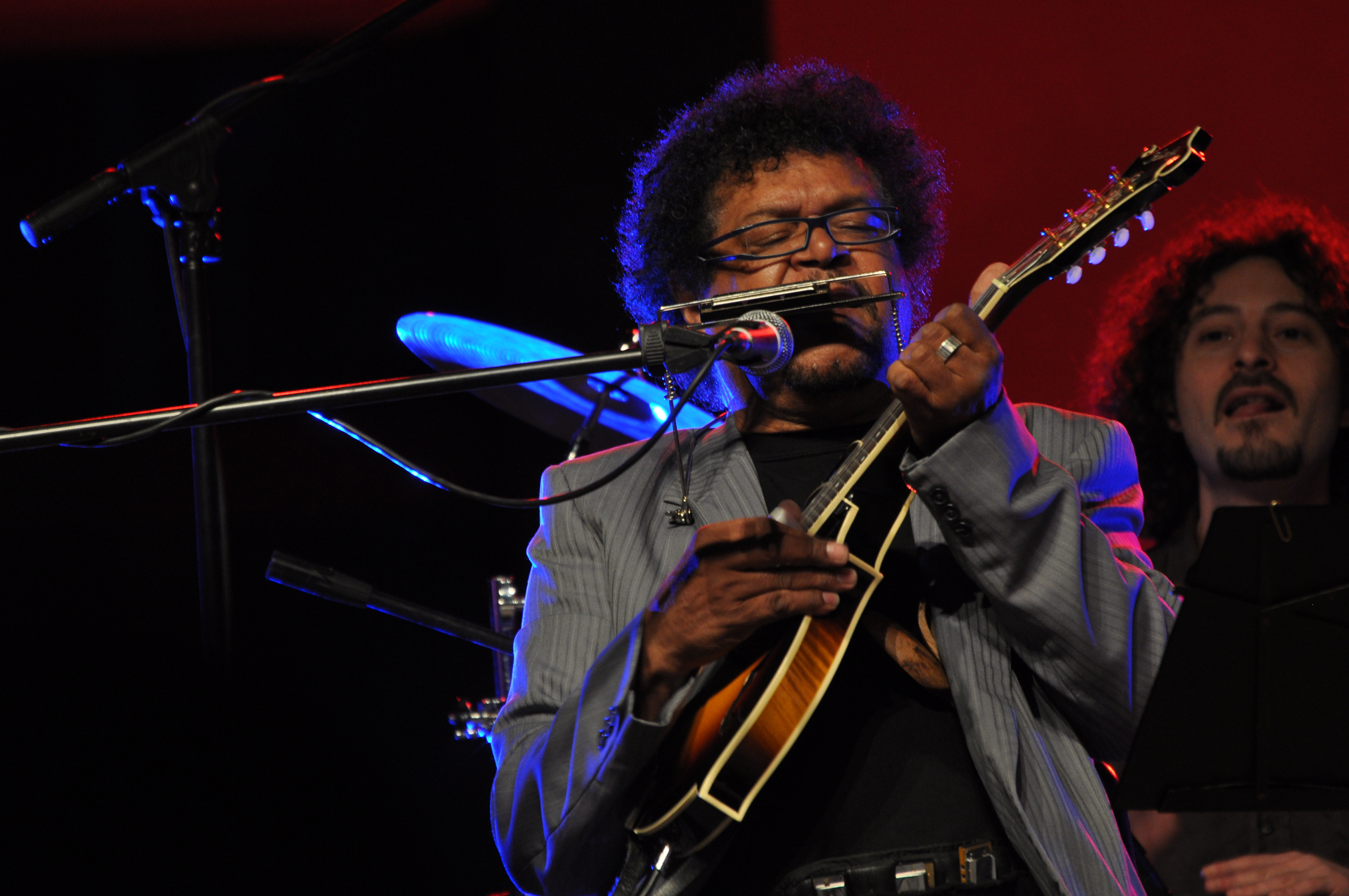
Harrison Kennedy and Folk's Wagon @ Piacenza Blues Festival

Canadian blues records have been made on a number of labels, including mainstream labels that are mainly associated with pop or jazz music, and smaller independent labels that specialize in acoustic or roots music. One of the oldest Canadian labels which specializes in blues and related musics is Stony Plain Records, a record company based in Edmonton, Alberta which was established in 1976 by Holger Petersen. The label has released over 300 albums of "roots" music styles, such as blues, classic R&B, folk, country, bluegrass, and rock and roll. Jerry Wexler, one of the founders of Atlantic Records, states that "Stony Plain, as an independent company, is an endangered species in a dangerous world – and a source of wonderful music."

In 1997, Andrew Galloway launched Electro-Fi Records, which has both international blues performers such as Mel Brown, Mark Hummel, Harmonica Shah, Fruteland Jackson, and Snooky Pryor; and Canadian musicians such as Julian Fauth, Diana Braithwaite & Chris Whiteley, Harrison Kennedy and Juno Award-winner Kenny "Blues Boss" Wayne. Juke Blues Magazine from the UK called Electro-Fi "Canada's Top Blues Outlet" in 2005.

The next addition to the family of Canadian blues labels is NorthernBlues Music, a blues label that was launched in 2001 by Fred Litwin, who aims to "add substantially to the blues repertoire" with interesting, original music. In 2011, Nicky Estor launched Iguane Records, which specializes in roots music (blues, swing, jazz, soul, funk, reggae, etc.); the labels artists include Nicky Estor, Nico Wayne Toussaint, Natalie Byrns, Ben Racine Band and Richard Carr.

== Societies ==
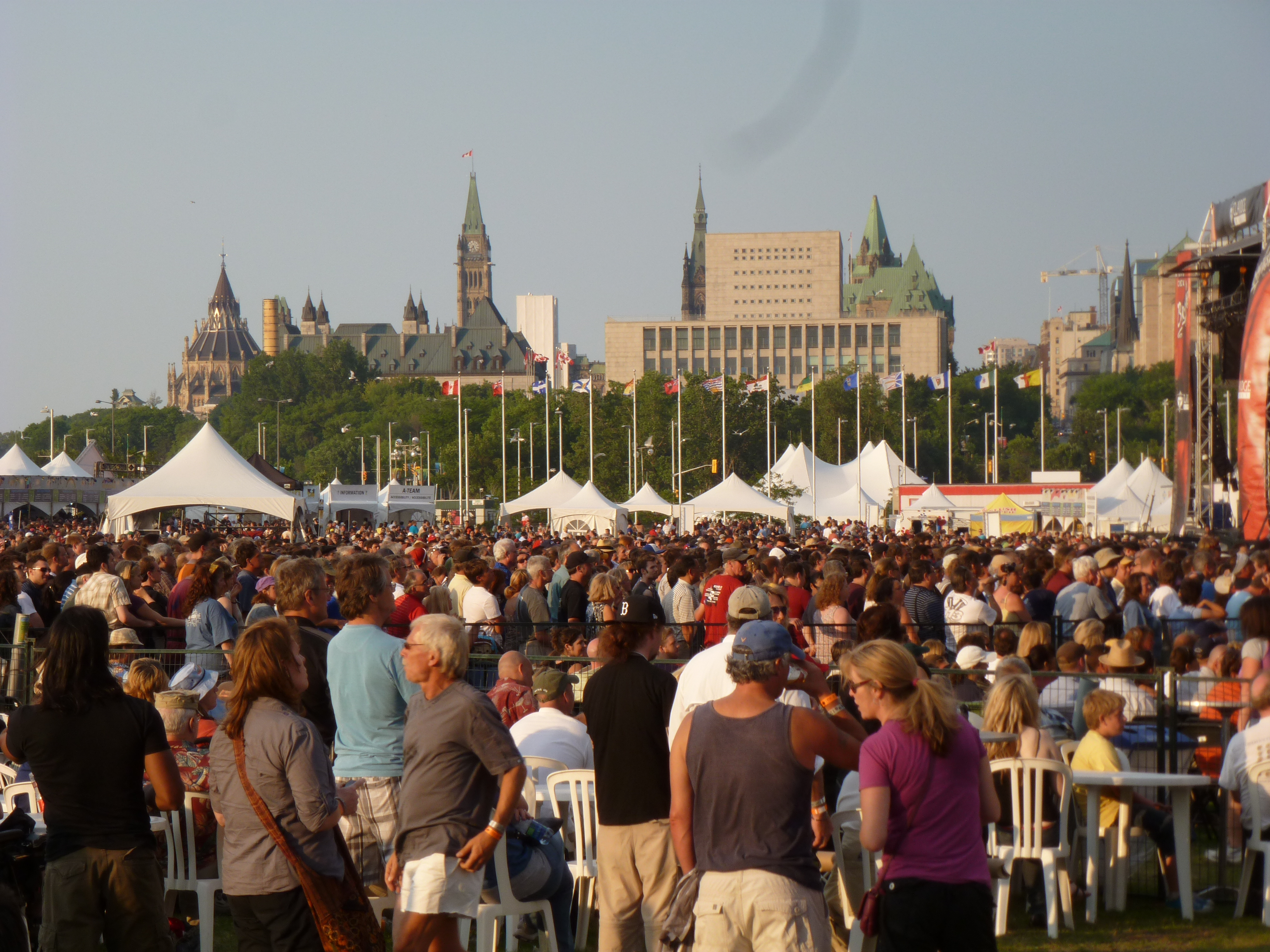
Bluesfest crowds in Ottawa, 2011

Canadian blues societies are non-profit community organizations that help to promote the appreciation and performance of blues music. Blues societies are often involved in the organization or promotion of local blues festivals and educational activities. Blues society educational activities include presentations on blues history, elementary school "outreach" activities, and workshops. Some blues societies organize awards for blues musicians. For example, the Toronto Blues Society has organized the Maple Blues Awards, an awards show for all Canadian blues musicians that has an annual gala.

Blues societies such as the Loyal Blues Fellowship in Belleville, east of Toronto, encourage local blues musicians, run educational programs, and organize blues events. The Loyal Blues Fellowship also collaborates with the Loyalist College's Hospitality and Tourism program to give students practical work experience with the running of the Fellowship's annual blues festival. East coast-area blues societies include the East Coast Blues Society and the Tantramarsh Blues Society from New Brunswick.

Central Canadian blues societies include the Ottawa Blues Society, the Toronto Blues Society, and the Canada South Blues Society, which has members from a large area of Southern Ontario. Western Canadian blues societies include the Saskatoon Blues Society, the Edmonton Blues Society, the Calgary Blues Music Association, the Prince George Chapter of the "Blues Underground Network", the White Rock Blues Society, the Fraser Valley Blues Society and the Nanaimo Blues Society.

== Festivals and venues ==
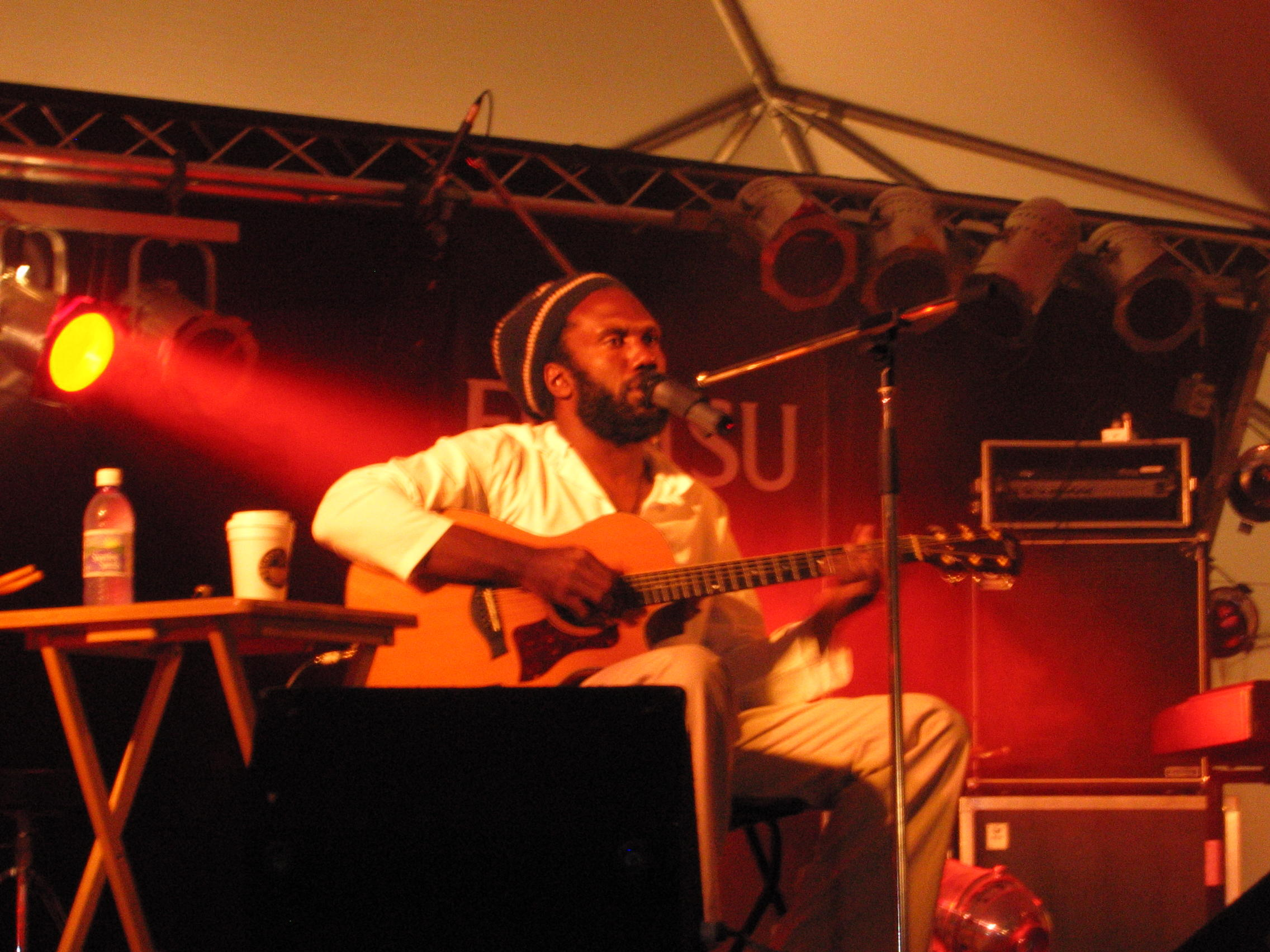
Corey Harris performing at the Harvest Jazz & Blues Festival in Fredericton, NB.

Canada has a number of blues festivals, ranging from small, community-based festivals that feature mostly local performers to major corporate-sponsored festivals that draw nationally and internationally prominent blues bands and huge crowds. Some of the large festivals include the Ottawa Bluesfest, the Fredericton Harvest Jazz & Blues Festival in New Brunswick, the Dutch Mason Blues Festival in Nova Scotia, The Hamilton Blues & Roots Festival in Ontario, Calgary International Blues Festival and the Edmonton's Labatt Blues Festival and the Nanaimo Blues Festival.

== See also ==
- Music of Canada
- Canadian rock
- Canadian music genres
- Music of Canadian cultures
