= The Way It Feels =

The Way It Feels may refer to:

- The Way It Feels (Maddie & Tae album), released in 2020
- The Way It Feels (Roxanne Potvin album), released in 2006
