= Christoffer Andersen =

Norwegian guitarist

Christoffer "Kid" Andersen
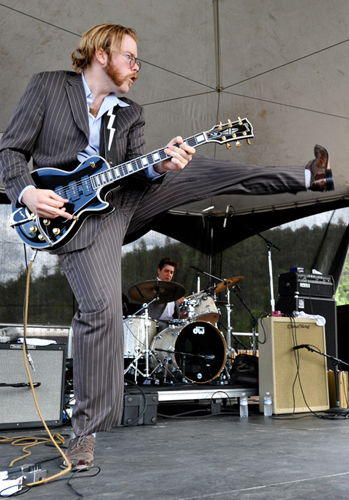
- Kid Andersen performing at the 2009 Coloma Blues Live! festival

Background information
- Born: Christoffer Andersen; 15 January 1980 (age 45)
- Origin: Telemark, Norway
- Genres: Blues, soul
- Occupations: Guitarist, record producer
- Instrument: Guitar
- Years active: 1998–present
- Labels: Alligator

Christoffer "Kid" Andersen (born 15 January 1980) is a blues guitarist from Herre, Norway.

By age 11, Andersen had gained the attention of Norwegian blues guitar teacher, Morten Omlid, who steered him towards traditional blues music. In 2001, at age 21, Andersen moved to the United States, joined blues frontman Terry Hanck's band, and quickly became a figure on the West Coast blues scene.

Andersen later played in Charlie Musselwhite's band and got a Blues Music Award (formerly W.C. Handy Award) for best contemporary blues album for Charlie Musselwhite's Delta Hardware. Then, when Little Charlie Baty retired from touring, Andersen took his place as guitarist in the Nightcats, and the new name of Rick Estrin & The Nightcats was formed. Andersen has also done extensive touring with Elvin Bishop on the Red Dog Speaks Tour.

In 2013, Andersen was nominated for a Blues Music Award in the 'Gibson Guitar' category. In 2014, 2015, 2016, and 2023 he was nominated for a Blues Music Award in the 'Best Instrumentalist – Guitar' category.

He is married to American Idol alum (from the third season) Lisa Leuschner. They reside in San Jose, California where Andersen is CEO of his own recording facility Greaseland Studios. Andersen has produced records there. He produced two albums for Rick Estrin & The Nightcats: One Wrong Turn (2012) and Groovin' in Greaseland (2017). In 2017, he also produced several albums including Stompin' Ground from Tommy Castro. In 2019, he co-produced Junior Watson's, album, Nothin' to it But to Do It (which featured Andersen's wife, Lisa, on lead vocals).

== Discography ==
- Rock Awhile (2003)
- Guitarmageddon (2004)
- Greaseland (2006)
- The Dreamer (2007)
