= Roxanne Potvin =

Canadian singer, guitarist and songwriter

- Born: March 31, 1982 (age 44); Regina, Saskatchewan, Canada
- Origin: Gatineau, Quebec, Canada
- Genres: Roots music, Pop, Blues
- Occupations: Guitarist, singer-songwriter
- Instruments: Vocals, guitar
- Years active: 2002–present
- Label: Independent
- Website: www.roxannepotvin.com

Roxanne Potvin (born March 31, 1982, in Regina, Saskatchewan) is a bilingual French-English Canadian singer, guitarist and songwriter based in Gatineau, Quebec. Potvin has earned a Juno nomination, seven Maple Blues awards nominations, making appearances at the Montreal Jazz Festival and Ottawa Bluesfest, and has toured internationally.

== Early life ==
Born in Regina, where her father was a TV reporter for CBC, Potvin grew up in Hull, Quebec. From an early age, she was attracted to the 1950s American rock n' roll of Little Richard, Chuck Berry, Jerry Lee Lewis, Elvis Presley and the Everly Brothers. At the age of 13, she discovered the Beatles. On her 14th birthday, she received a guitar, and at 15, she discovered blues music and began experimenting with songwriting. She did not consider music as a career until two years later, when performing at open jams in Ottawa.

== Career ==
=== Bogart's Bounce ===
Potvin made her recording debut in January 2002 when she sang an original tune on Bogart's Bounce, a Northern Blues release by Ottawa's JW-Jones Blues Band. Veteran blues giants Kim Wilson and Gene Taylor of the Fabulous Thunderbirds also appeared on the album.

=== Careless Loving ===
In 2003 Potvin wrote a canon of songs with which she self-produced, self-financed, self-released, and self promoted her first recording, Careless Loving. The album featured six original songs and four covers by Dinah Washington, Ruth Brown, Etta James and Buddy Johnson. This album helped build her reputation as a songwriter as well as a singer and player. Local writers (and campus and CBC Radio) embraced the CD, and Potvin's reputation began to spread.

=== The Way It Feels ===
The Way It Feels (2006), produced by Colin Linden, a Nashville-based Canadian guitarist and writer with 60 CD production projects to his name, helped bring together a cast of support players that included: Daniel Lanois, Bruce Cockburn, Wayne Jackson of The Memphis Horns, members of The Fairfield Four, and one of Potvin's favourite songwriters and singers, John Hiatt.

The album received a Juno Award nomination for Blues Album of the Year.

=== Time Bomb ===
Time Bomb (2007) featured three female blues players, Deborah Coleman, Sue Foley and Potvin. The title track, "Time Bomb", an instrumental where all three women take turns laying down leads. For the next nine songs the women spell each other off taking lead vocals and guitar duties of every third song until they come together again on the final track "In The Basement".

=== No Love for the Poisonous ===
No Love for the Poisonous (2008) was produced by Dave Mackinnon of FemBots. In a favourable review of the album, The Globe and Mail wrote, "Smartly timeless and featuring the most assured songwriting of Potvin's three-album career, No Love for the Poisonous is a wicked success story."

=== Play ===
In 2011, Potvin changed directions and recorded Play, an album with a combination of folk, indie rock and pop influences. She collaborated with Black Hen Music director and guitarist Steve Dawson and a crew of Vancouver studio musicians, recording an album of new songs in five days.

=== For Dreaming ===
Roxanne Potvin's latest album, For Dreaming, was released in 2016 and follows a five-year break from recording. Potvin stated that making For Dreaming largely on her own was "the most challenging and frightening experience" she has had in her career to this point but also "the most satisfying experience" as well, due to being able to work at home without any outside pressure.

== Management ==
Roxanne Potvin signed with Alert Music Inc. late in 2005, and was managed by W. Tom Berry (Holly Cole, Kim Mitchell, Gino Vannelli) from 2005 to 2009. She is since self-managed.

== Influences ==
Potvin has stated that her music has been influenced by her growing up and listening to artists such as: Dinah Washington, Freddie King, Muddy Waters, Big Bill Broonzy, John Hiatt, the Beatles, Elvis Presley, the Everly Brothers, Aretha Franklin, Sarah Vaughan, Billie Holiday, Solomon Burke, Irma Thomas, Jimmy Reed, the Staple Singers, Ruth Brown, and others. Contemporary or more recent influences include Beck, Bahamas, Kurt Vile, Brian Wilson.

== Discography ==
=== Main releases ===
Year	Title	Label
2003	Careless Loving	Independent
2006	The Way It Feels	Alert Music Inc.
2008	No Love for the Poisonous	Alert Music Inc.
2011	Play	Black Hen Music
2016	For Dreaming	Independent

=== Collaborations ===
Year	Title	Label	Notes
2002	Bogart's Bounce	NorthernBlues Music	sang on one track with JW-Jones
2004	My Kind of Evil	NorthernBlues Music	sang on one track with JW-Jones
2007	Time Bomb	Ruf (Idn)	with Sue Foley & Deborah Coleman
