= Deborah Coleman =

American singer-songwriter

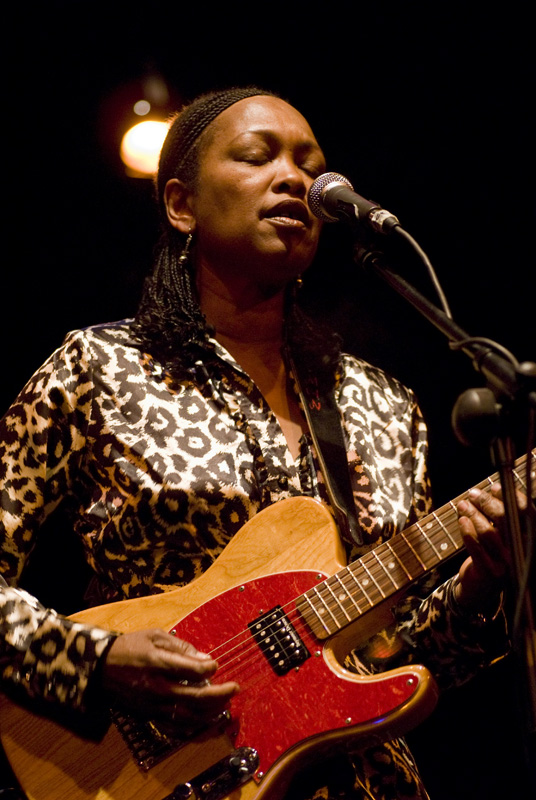
- Coleman in concert, 2009

Background information
- Born: Deborah Francine Coleman; October 3, 1956; Portsmouth, Virginia, U.S.
- Died: April 12, 2018 (aged 61) Norfolk, Virginia, U.S.
- Genres: Blues, rock
- Occupation: Musician
- Instrument: Guitar
- Years active: 1995–2018
- Labels: Blind Pig, Telarc, JSP, Ruf

Deborah Coleman (October 3, 1956 – April 12, 2018) was an American blues musician. Coleman won the Orville Gibson Award for "Best Blues Guitarist, Female" in 2001, and was nominated for a W.C. Handy Blues Music Award nine times.

== Biography ==
Coleman was born in Portsmouth, Virginia She graduated in 1974 from Deep Creek High School in Chesapeake, Virginia. She worked in various professions, including as a master electrician, before pursuing a career in the music business.

Her album Time Bomb (2007) featured three women blues musicians: Coleman, Sue Foley and Roxanne Potvin.

Coleman died unexpectedly on April 12, 2018, in a hospital in Norfolk, Virginia, from complications brought on by bronchitis and pneumonia.

== Selective discography ==
=== Albums ===
| Year | Title | Genre | Label |
|---|---|---|---|
| 1995 | Takin' a Stand | Blues/Rock | New Moon |
| 1997 | I Can't Lose | Blues-Rock | Blind Pig |
| 1998 | Where Blue Begins | Blues/Rock | Blind Pig |
| 2000 | Soft Place to Fall | Blues/Rock | Blind Pig |
| 2001 | Livin' on Love | Blues/Rock | New Moon |
| 2002 | Soul Be It | Blues/Rock | Blind Pig |
| 2004 | What About Love? | Blues | Telarc |
| 2007 | Stop the Game | Blues/Rock | JSP |

=== Compilation albums ===
| Year | Title | Genre | Label | Notes |
|---|---|---|---|---|
| 2007 | Time Bomb | Blues Rock | Ruf (Idn) | with Sue Foley & Roxanne Potvin |
