= Rick Estrin & The Nightcats =

American electric blues band

Rick Estrin
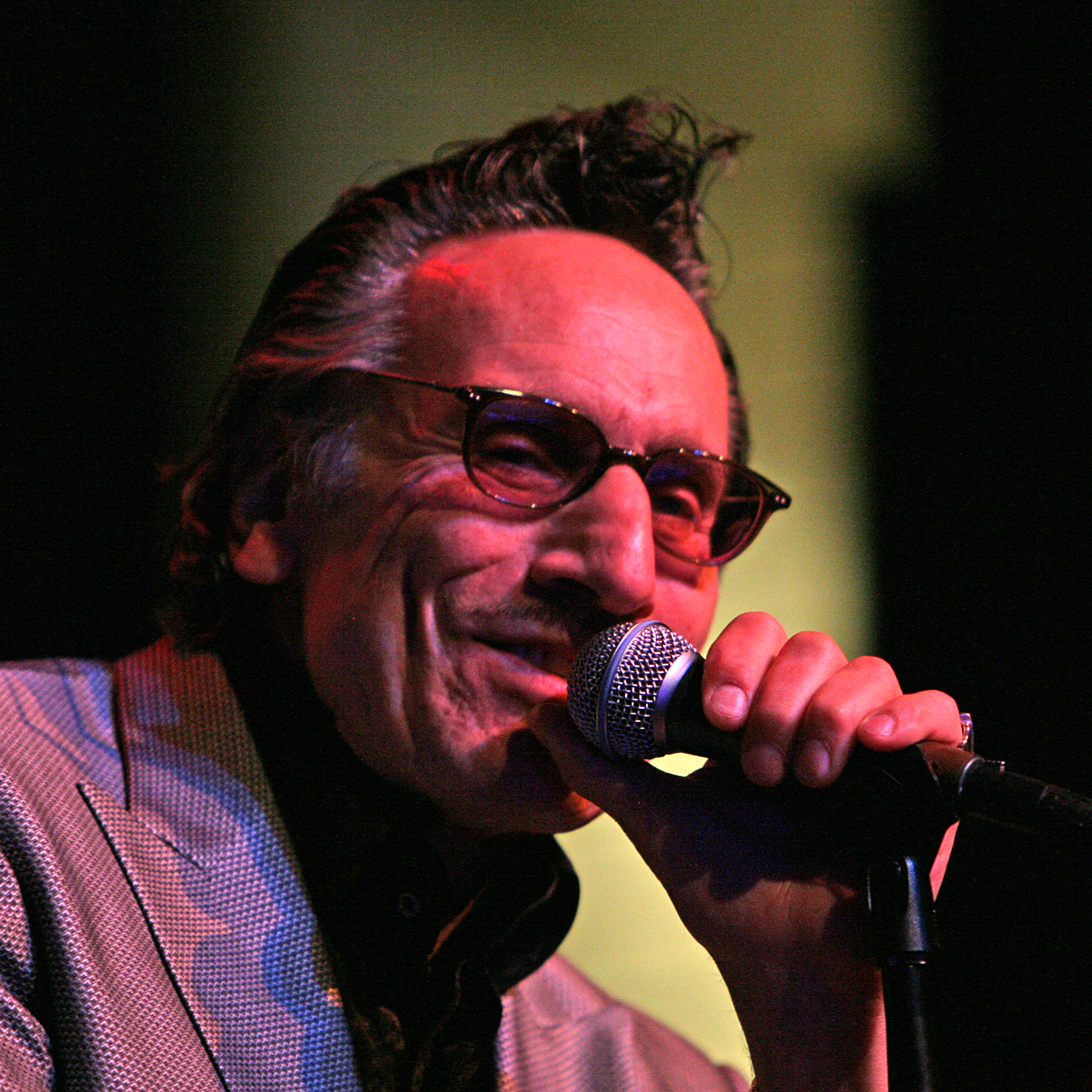
- Rick Estrin in San Diego 2007

Background information
- Born: Rick Estrin; October 5, 1949 (age 76); San Francisco, California, U.S.
- Genre: Blues,
- Occupations: Harmonicist, singer
- Instruments: Harmonica, vocals
- Years active: 1967–present
- Label: Alligator Records
- Website: www.rickestrin.com

Rick Estrin & the Nightcats are an American electric blues band formed in 2008.

The group was established by ex-members of Little Charlie & the Nightcats. Members include Rick Estrin on vocals and harmonica, guitarist Kid Andersen, organist and bassist Lorenzo Farrell and drummer Derrick "D'Mar" Martin. Blues Revue magazine said, "The ‘Cats are one of modern blues’ most versatile bands." Living Blues said, "Estrin's harp work is masterful" and their music is "intelligently conceived and executed and hugely entertaining."

== Career ==
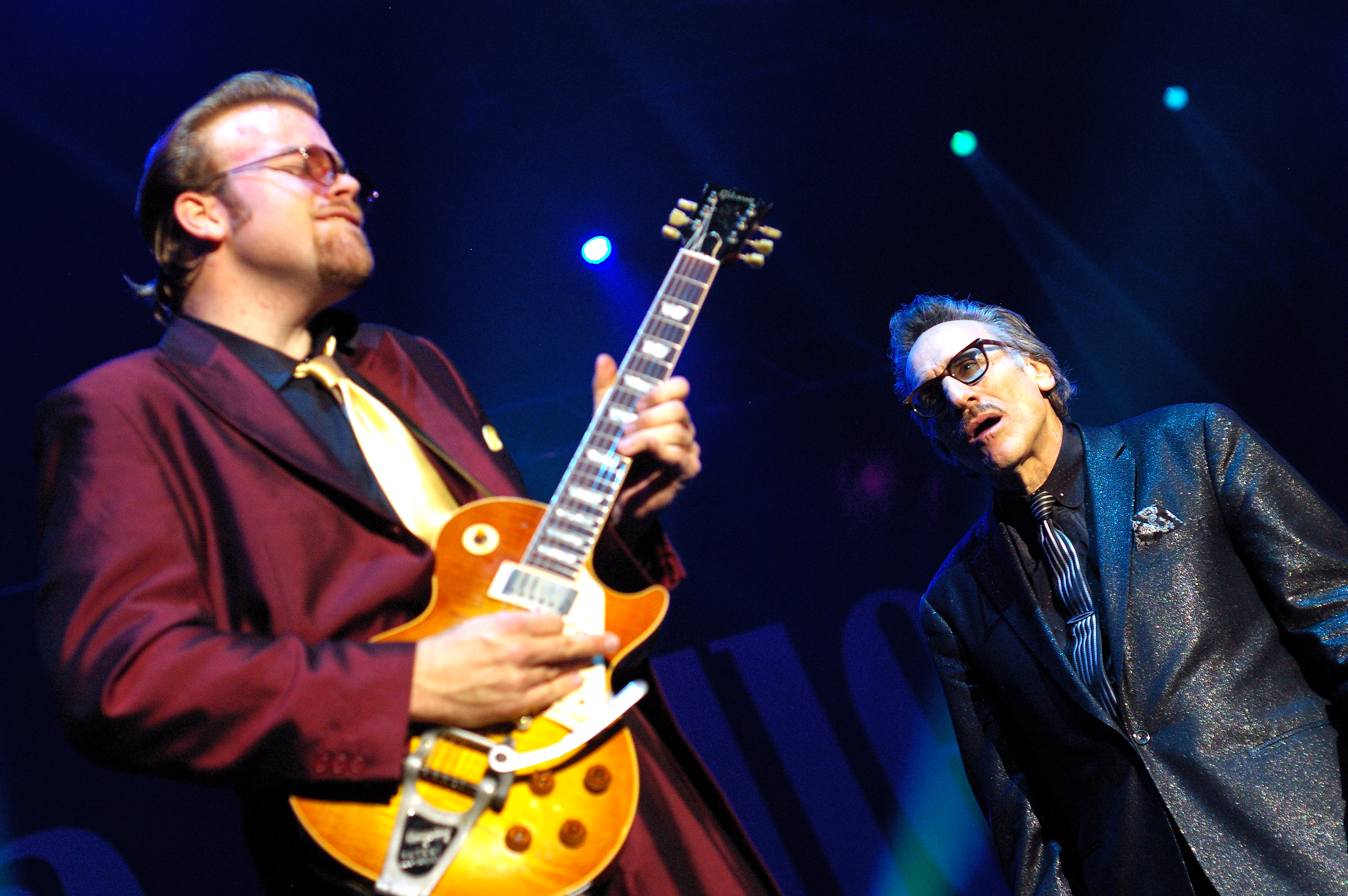
Rick Estrin (right) and Kid Andersen at the 2010 Rawa Blues Festival.

The band's album, Groovin' in Greaseland, was released on Alligator Records on August 18, 2017. At the Blues Foundation's 39th Annual Blues Music Awards, Rick Estrin & the Nightcats won 'Band of the Year', along with 'Song of The Year' (for "The Blues Ain't Going Nowhere") and 'Traditional Male Blues Artist' (Rick Estrin).

You Asked For It...Live!, was also released on the Chicago-based independent blues record label Alligator Records on July 8, 2014. The album is a live recording from Estrin's hometown of San Francisco and featured original Estrin songs dating back to his days as lead singer, songwriter and harmonica player of Little Charlie & the Nightcats (featuring Little Charlie Baty on guitar). Rick Estrin & The Nightcats released their debut recording Twisted in 2009 and One Wrong Turn in 2012, both also on Alligator Records.

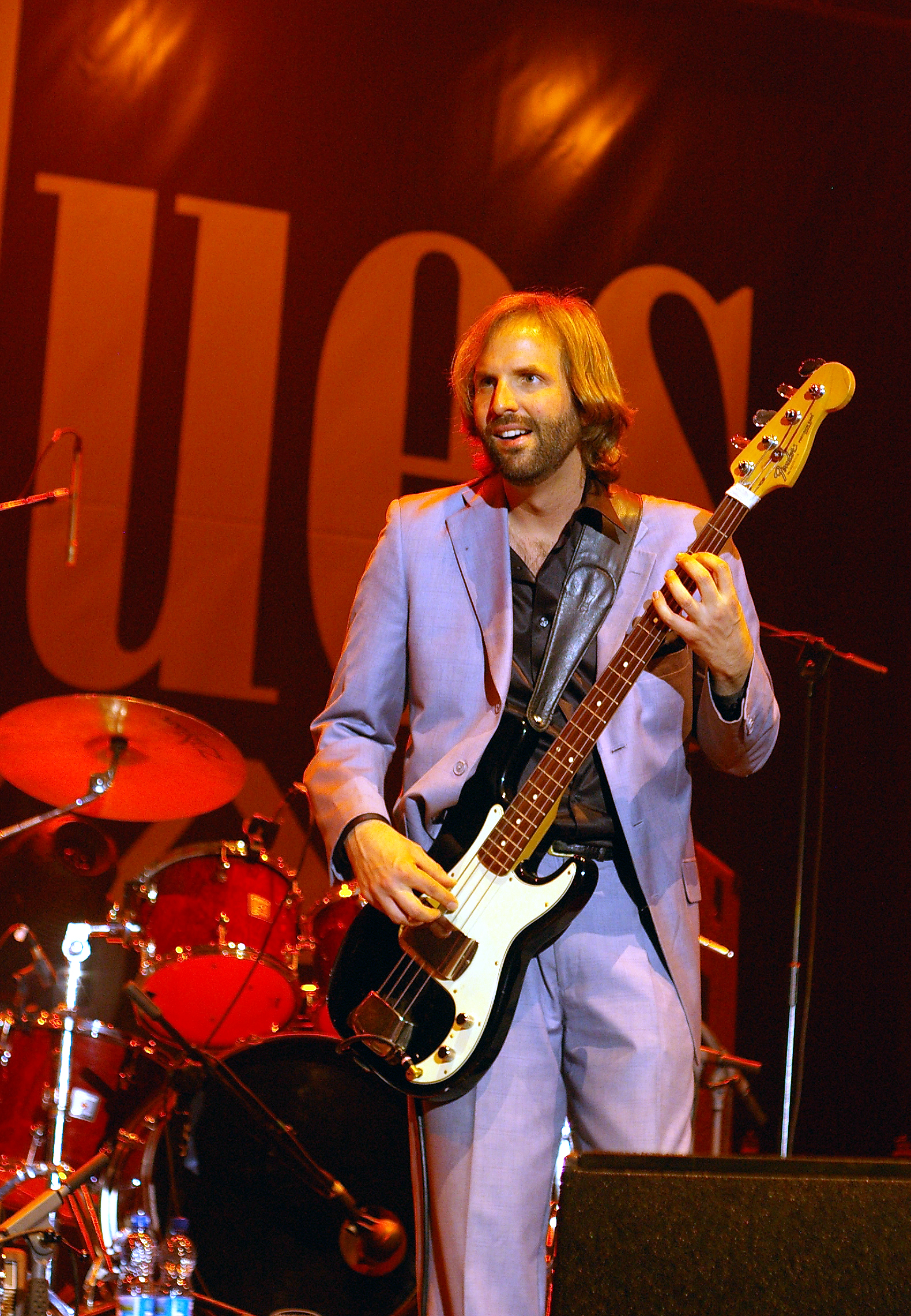
Lorenzo Farrell (bass player) at the 2010 Rawa Blues Festival.

Rick Estrin won the 2013 Blues Music Award for Best Instrumentalist–Harmonica in 2013. He won the 1994 Blues Music Award for Song of the Year for his composition "My Next Ex-Wife". He has written songs for other musicians. Three of his songs appear on Grammy-nominated albums: “Don’t Put Your Hands On Me” (on Koko Taylor’s Force Of Nature), “I’m Just Lucky That Way” (on Robert Cray’s Shame + A Sin), and “Homely Girl” (on John Hammond’s Trouble No More). The Philadelphia Inquirer said, “He’s one of the great characters in blues – a sharp-dressing, smooth talking harmonica-playing hep-cat. He’s also a deceptively subtle writer who can cloak pointed or sobering messages within the band’s good-time vibe.”

Estrin was born in San Francisco, California in 1949, and fell in love with blues after his sister presented him with Ray Charles’ The Genius Sings The Blues when he was 12. He began playing harmonica at age 15, and by age 18 was beginning to work professionally. Early in his career he played with Lowell Fulson, Z.Z. Hill, Travis Phillips, and Fillmore Slim.Estrin names Sonny Boy Williamson II, Little Walter Jacobs and Baby Boy Warren as key inspirations. He played with and was mentored by Rodger Collins (whose 45rpm recordings include "She's Looking Good" and "Foxy Girls" In Oakland). Estrin moved to Chicago when he was 19 and worked with bluesmen Sam Lay, Johnny Littlejohn, Eddie Taylor and Johnny Young. He met and sat in with Muddy Waters at the Sutherland Hotel in Chicago. He told the Sacramento Bee, "Muddy started shaking his finger in my face and said, ‘You outta sight, boy! You play like a man! I know that sound. That's my sound.’" Muddy tried to hire Estrin as a sideman but Estrin did not receive the phone call, and moved back to the Bay Area. He met guitarist Charlie Baty in 1973 and they created Little Charlie & the Nightcats based in Sacramento, California. Estrin fronted Little Charlie & the Nightcats for 30 years and performed around the world. They were nominated four times for the Blues Music Award for Band of the Year. In 2008, Baty retired from touring. Guitarist Kid Andersen joined Estrin with previous band members Hansen and Farrell and they formed Rick Estrin & The Nightcats that same year. Norwegian born Alexander Pettersen joined the band in 2017 as the drummer.

Since its inception, the band has played around the world, including the Notodden Blues Festivil in Norway, the Lucerne Blues Festival in Switzerland, the Caxias de Soul Festival in Brazil, the Monaghan Blues Festival in Ireland, the Efes Pilsen Festival in Turkey, and the Moulin Blues Festival in the Netherlands. In the United States they’ve played the North Atlantic Blues Festival, the Magic City Blues Festival and the Bayfront Blues Festival. Estrin performed at the Chicago Blues Festival in 2011 as part of the Alligator Records 40th anniversary concert. The band also performed at the Chicago Blues Festival in 2017.

In May 2020, Estrin won a Blues Music Award in the 'Instrumentalist - Harmonica' category. At the 2025 version of the same ceremony, Rick Estrin & the Nightcaps were named 'Band of the Year'.

== Discography ==
- 2009 Twisted (Alligator)
- 2012 One Wrong Turn (Alligator)
- 2014 You Asked For It...Live! (Alligator)
- 2017 Groovin' In Greaseland (Alligator)
- 2019 Contemporary (Alligator)
- 2024 The Hits Keep Coming (Alligator)

== Current band members ==
- Rick Estrin – Harmonica, vocals
- Chris "Kid" Andersen – Guitar, upright bass, background vocals
- Lorenzo Farrell – Upright bass, electric bass, organ
- Derrick "D'Mar" Martin – Drums, background vocals
