= Where Blue Begins =

Studio album by Deborah Coleman
- Released: 1998
- Genre: Blues
- Label: Blind Pig

Deborah Coleman chronology
I Can't Lose (1997)	Where Blue Begins (1998)	Soft Place to Fall (2000)

Where Blue Begins is an album by the American musician Deborah Coleman, released in 1998. Coleman supported the album with a North American tour, backed by her band, the Thrillseekers. Coleman was nominated for a W. C. Handy Award for best "Blues Instrumentalist, Guitar".

== Production ==
Coleman wanted a smoother sound for the album, and chose to use Luther Allison's band rather than her touring band. She worked on her songs by driving around in her van and using a tape recorder to capture musical ideas. Coleman played a Fender Squier Telecaster. Most of the lyrics are drawn from Coleman's personal experience. "They Raided the Joint" is a version of the Louis Jordan song. "Hain't It Funny" is a cover of the song by Jane Siberry.

== Critical reception ==
Professional ratings
Review scores
Source	Rating
AllMusic	3/5 stars
DownBeat	2.5/5 stars
The Penguin Guide to Blues Recordings	2.5/4 stars

The Pittsburgh Post-Gazette wrote that Coleman "has a soulful, expressive voice that complements a guitar style that moves fluidly from subtle to searing." The San Diego Union-Tribune said that "she writes insightful songs with tales pulled from her own experience and delivers them with sass and emotional intensity." Jazziz noted that "some solos, perhaps inspired by Jeff Beck, are fleet-fingered and linear, though Coleman more often repeats short cascades of notes." The Toronto Star concluded that, "though her voice clearly has a way to go before it makes you misty-eyed, her axe work is nothing less than astonishing." The Washington Post opined that, "when Coleman tries to blend blues and funk, as on the opening track 'Love Moves Me', she matches cliches from each camp rather than crafting something new."

AllMusic labeled Coleman "a female lead singer who's not imitating the bellowing 'blues mama' persona so familiar to the genre, and she's one hell of a lead guitar player."

== Track listing ==
No.	Title	Length
1.	"Love Moves Me"
2.	"Goodbye Misery"
3.	"Hain't It Funny"
4.	"Travelin' South"
5.	"The Dream"
6.	"Walk Your Walk"
7.	"They Raided the Joint"
8.	"Do You Want My Love"
9.	"On the Hunt"
10.	"Beside Myself"
11.	"Nobody to Blame"
