= Richard Carr (blues musician) =

Canadian blues singer and guitar player

Richard Carr is a Canadian blues singer and guitar player.

He had his childhood in Montreal, but during the summers he lived on the Alabama Gulf Coast. According to CBC, Canada's national broadcaster, his "gigs have been become more steadily frequent and at increasingly larger venues including some of Canada’s most prestigious blues clubs and festivals." The CBC states that "Carr’s original songs feel old, in a good way" and they "tell stories."

He won the 2006 and 2012 LysBlues Award.
