= JW-Jones =

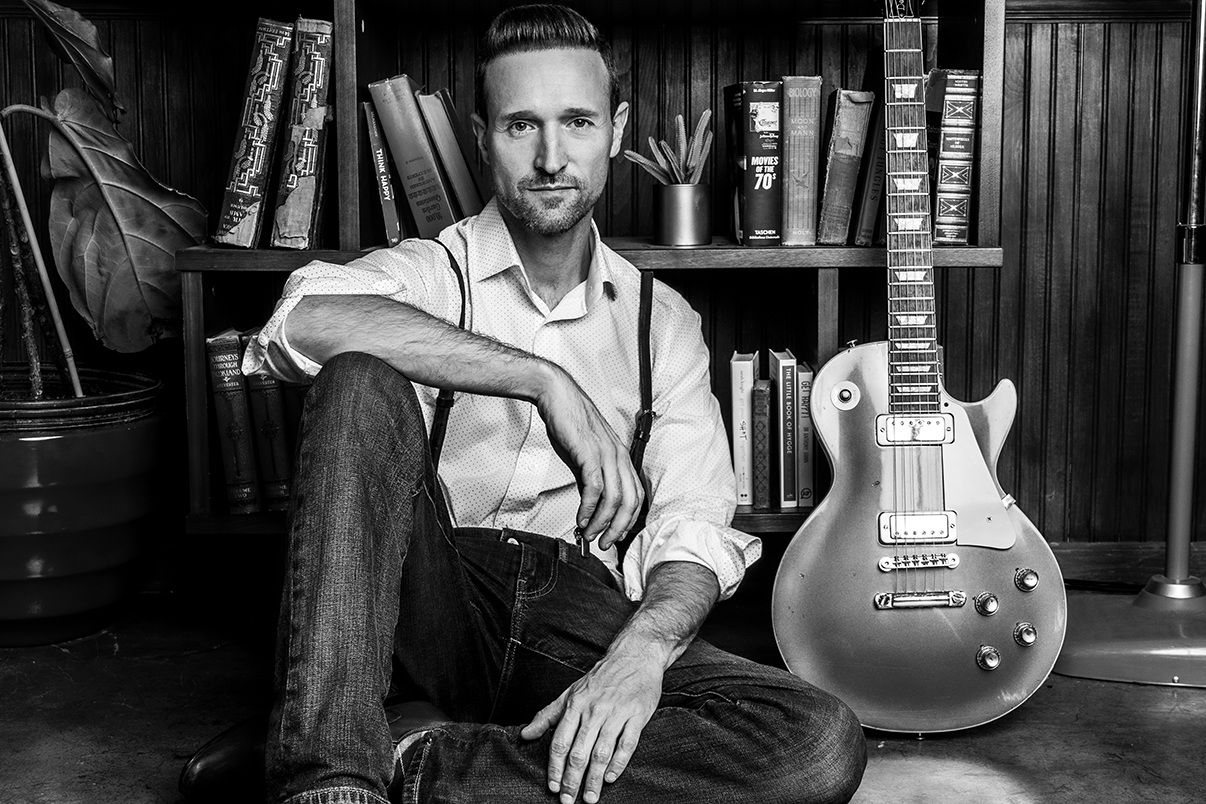
- JW-Jones in Los Angeles (2023)

Background information
- Born: July 15, 1980 (age 46); Ottawa, Ontario, Canada
- Genres: Blues, jump blues, rock and roll, swing revival, soul, roots
- Instruments: Guitar, vocals, drums
- Years active: 1998–present
- Website: jw-jones.com

JW-Jones (born July 15, 1980) is a Canadian blues guitarist, singer, songwriter and band leader. He is a Juno Award nominee (2015), Billboard magazine Top 10 Selling artist, and winner of the International Blues Challenge for "Best Self-Produced CD Award" for his release 'High Temperature' in 2017 and Best Guitarist in 2020.

Jones' first recording contract was signed with CrossCut Records (Germany) in 2000, who released his first seven CDs in Europe. He was the first artist signed to the NorthernBlues Music label in Toronto and released his first six recordings with the label. Jones has also worked with Ruf Records in the USA, and Blind Pig Records. He has released nine studio albums and one live album. He has played in 23 countries on four continents and continues to tour extensively. Jones, who lives in Ottawa, Ontario, has performed at blues festivals, theatres and clubs in Canada, the USA, Europe, United Kingdom, Russia, Australia and Brazil.

On June 19, 2014, Jones was presented with a Forty Under 40 Award by Ottawa Business Journal/Ottawa Chamber of Commerce. It is a celebration of entrepreneurship in Ottawa - a "salute to the region’s young business stars who balance business achievement, professional expertise and community involvement."

== Critical response ==
In May 2009, Jones' song "Parasomnia" appeared on a Guitar World featured CD, Guitar Masters Vol. 2, among B.B. King, Jimmy Page, Jeff Beck and Carlos Santana. The Canadian national newspaper The Globe and Mail referred to Jones as "one of this country's top blues guitar stars". The US Blues Revue magazine' stated that "Jones' style is a fluid amalgam of T-Bone Walker's big, bright chords, Johnny "Guitar" Watson's slashing leads, and Clarence "Gatemouth" Brown's jazzy sting". Billboard called Jones part of "a new wave of young talent moving onto Canada’s blues stage."

Charlie Musselwhite stated, "JW Jones is one of the best guitar players I’ve heard in a long time. He and his band do great tunes with cool arrangements and I love listening to them. They play with taste and fire at the same time." The guitarist Little Charlie Baty has said, "JW is one of the young guns in the blues guitar world who consistently delivers the goods on record and on stage - and of course I'm gonna dig anybody who writes a tune called 'Batyology'!" (an instrumental that Jones wrote in homage to Baty). The Canadian-born Hollywood actor Dan Aykroyd, who is also known for his Blues Brothers persona "Elwood Blues" has called the group an "amazing blues band".

Chuck Leavell, a member of the Rolling Stones, wrote "His evolution as a musician and vocalist shine through on this record like never before. Real songs, real playing by real people, and JW is the real deal" in the liner notes for the JW-Jones release 'High Temperature'.

== Career ==
=== 1990s ===
Jones started as a drummer and was invited to sit in with Mississippi blues artist Big Jack Johnson, New Orleans artist Jumpin' Johnny Sansone, and Ottawa musician Tony D. among others.

As a guitarist and singer, Jones, who attended Ridgemont High School in Ottawa, Ontario, won the 1998 R&R Concerts "Battle of the Bands", at the age of eighteen. The prize package included studio time that was used to record a six song demo that was later reviewed by Blues Revue. The next year, Jones won the 1999 Ottawa Blues Guitar Riff-Off competition. The prize package included studio time that was used to record his first album, Defibrillatin (SBR001-2000 / NBM0001-2001). The album included Steve Marriner, a then-high-school-age Ottawa blues harp player. AllMusic states that the "Keyboardist [Pierre] Chretien [on organ and piano] is credited with bringing a jazz influence to Jones' and the band's sound" during that time period. The CD liner notes say that Steve Hiscox played drums on the album and Nathan Morris played upright bass. Morris played on several subsequent albums and played and toured with the band. On subsequent albums, Morris is also credited for electric bass.

=== 2000-2009 ===
In the 2000s, Jones was invited to perform on stage with a number of blues bands and artists, including The Fabulous Thunderbirds, Junior Watson, Little Charlie & the Nightcats, Rusty Zinn, Rick Holmstrom, Rod Piazza & The Mighty Flyers, Anson Funderburgh & The Rockets, The Mannish Boys and Hubert Sumlin. Jones' second album was Bogart's Bounce, which included performances by the singer and blues "harp" player Kim Wilson (from The Fabulous Thunderbirds) and the pianist Gene Taylor (from The Blasters).

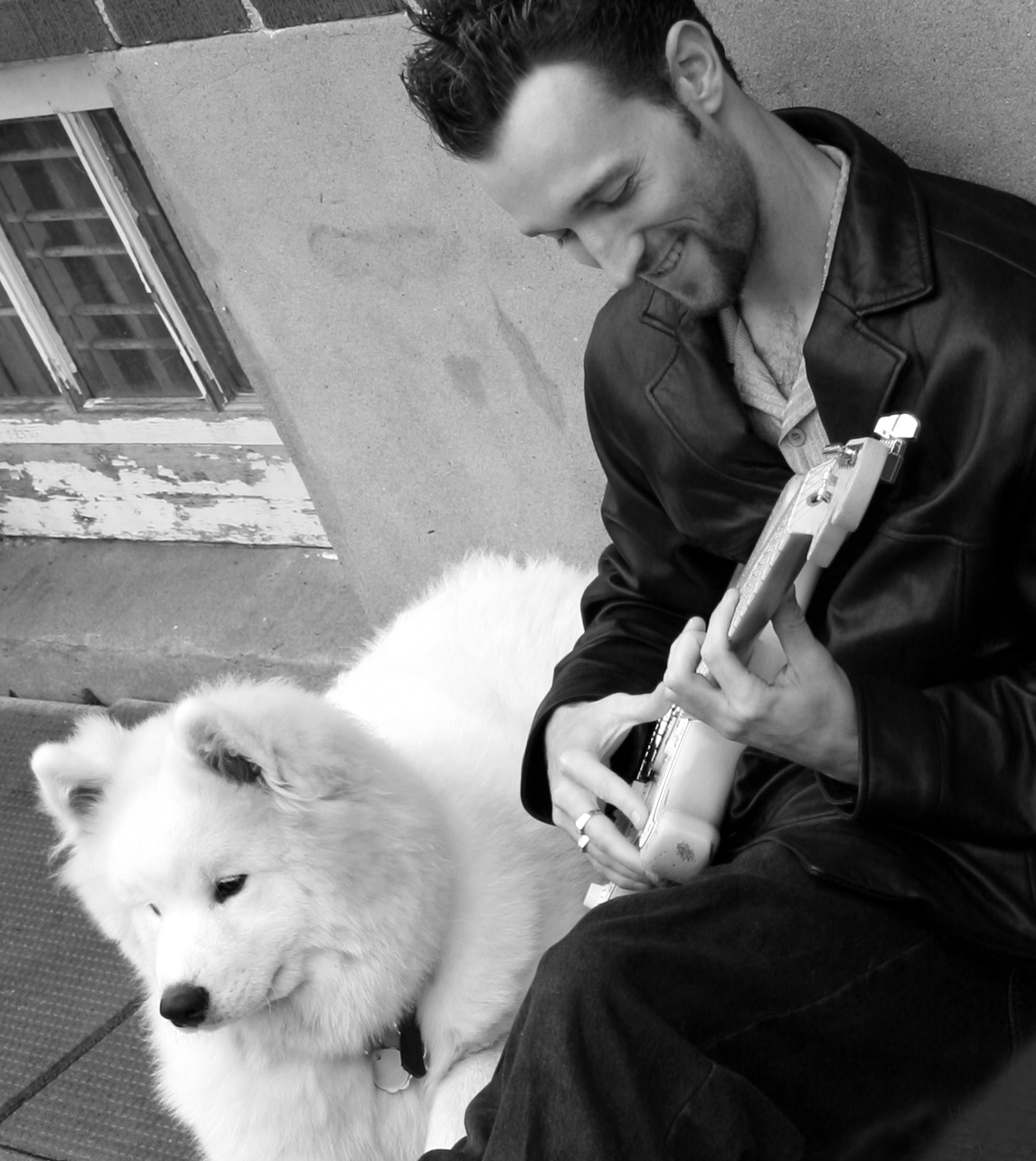
JW Jones playing guitar.

His third album with his band, My Kind of Evil (2004), was produced by the multi-Grammy nominee Kim Wilson (singer for The Fabulous Thunderbirds), and includes vocals by the Canadian singer/guitarist Colin James on two tracks, and Roxanne Potvin on another. Songs from the album have been played on the internationally syndicated House of Blues Radio Hour. The music reviewer Brad Wheeler from Canada's The Globe and Mail newspaper praised the "graceful ability he (Jones) shows on guitar" in the album. Wheeler wrote, "...the Ottawa player makes retro moves, layering swinging blues with keyboards and very noticeable horns that never dominate the fine-lined fills and lead work." The Allmusic review of My Kind of Evil, by Chris Nickson, says, "He's very good on covers, such as "I Don't Know," but his own songs — the vast majority of this disc — have plenty of life."

In 2006, Jones released his fourth album, Kissing in 29 Days, which included performances by David "Fathead" Newman on tenor saxophone. Newman was the main saxophone player with Ray Charles for 12 years. In Blues Revue magazine, Bret Kofford wrote, "JW-Jones is highly regarded in blues circles."

On May 13, 2008, the fifth album, Bluelisted went on sale. The recording includes special guests Little Charlie Baty (leader of the band Little Charlie & the Nightcats, which records on Alligator Records), Junior Watson, Richard Innes and Larry Taylor. The liner notes are written by Dan Aykroyd.

On May 6, 2009, Hubert Sumlin (then 77), a blues guitarist who worked with Howlin' Wolf for more than 20 years and was named in the 100 Greatest Guitarists of all time by Rolling Stone magazine, recorded with JW-Jones at Sun Studios in Memphis, Tennessee. The rhythm section was Richard Innes and Larry Taylor (who appear on Bluelisted).

=== 2010-2019 ===
Midnight Memphis Sun (NorthernBlues/CrossCut/Ruf) was released on August 10, 2010. In April 2011, Jones signed an endorsement deal with Gibson Guitars. Jones' seventh album, Seventh Hour, released on March 27, 2012, reached #1 on B.B. King's Bluesville on XM Sirius Satellite Radio, and led the band to performing at Buddy Guy's Legends in Chicago in February 2013, and opening for B.B. King at the RBC Ottawa Bluesfest on July 14, 2013.

Jones was asked to co-host the Maple Blues Awards in Toronto on January 20, 2014, which took place mid-way through a tour with Johnny Winter. Jones opened for Jimmie Vaughan in May that year.

On June 19, 2014, Jones was presented with a Forty Under 40 Award by Ottawa Business Journal/Ottawa Chamber of Commerce. It is the biggest and best celebration of entrepreneurship in Ottawa, a salute to the region’s young business stars who balance business achievement, professional expertise and community involvement.

"Belmont Boulevard" was released on October 14 and is Jones's first release for the American blues label Blind Pig Records, recorded in Nashville with the Grammy Award winning producer Tom Hambridge. It debuted at #9 on Billboard's Blues Charts on November 8, 2014. The disc was released in Canada on October 7, distributed by Stony Plain Records. It debuted and held the #1 position on Roots Music Report, the radio air-play chart, in Canada for thirteen weeks between October 2014 and February 2015. The album was nominated as Blues Album of the Year at the Juno Awards and Recording of the Year at Maple Blues Awards, and Jones was nominated for Guitarist of the Year.

After Buddy Guy sang with JW-Jones at Buddy Guy's Legends in Chicago, Illinois, on April 14, 2015, he asked Jones to play guitar with him during two sold-out shows at Centrepointe Theatre in Ottawa on April 27 and 28, 2015. Guy joined the band for the fourth time in seven months, at his club on November 15, 2015.

On July 17, 2015, Canned Heat invited Jones to perform during their set at Ottawa Bluesfest in Ottawa, and on September 12, 2015, invited Jones to perform during their set at Southside Shuffle Jazz & Blues Festival in Mississauga, Ontario,

In Mar/Apr 2016, Jones performed in England, Scotland, and Wales, on his first UK Tour.

On September 6, Guy sang with JW-Jones at Buddy Guy's Legends, the fifth time they have performed together on stage. Later that month, Jones performed two shows in Argentina, the 23rd country in which he has performed.

Jones' ninth record, High Temperature, produced in Nashville by Colin Linden with liner notes written by Chuck Leavell, a touring musician with The Rolling Stones, was released on October 28, 2016.

In November, JW-Jones' ninth release, High Temperature was named the "Hot Shot Debut" landing at No. 8 on the Billboard Top 10. On February 4, 2017, High Temperature won "Best Self-Produced CD Award" in Memphis at the International Blues Challenge, representing the Ottawa Blues Society. It was selected as a top 5 finalist a month earlier out of over 90 entries from worldwide blues societies.

Chad Smith, drummer of the Red Hot Chili Peppers made a guest appearance with Jones at Blues On Whyte in Edmonton, Alberta, on May 27, 2017. The appearance led to radio interviews with Edmonton's Sonic 1029 and The Ryan Jespersen Show (Global News - 630 CHED)

On November 12, 2017, Buddy Guy sang with JW-Jones at Buddy Guy's Legends, and told him "I love the way you play, man" during the appearance. This was the sixth time they have performed together on stage.

'High Temperature' was nominated for Recording/Producer of the Year at Maple Blues Awards with Colin Linden, and Jones' longtime bassist, Laura Greenberg was nominated for Bass Player of the Year.

Jones released his tenth album, and first live album, entitled LIVE on September 28, 2018.

=== 2020-present ===
JW-Jones competed with HOROJO Trio representing the Ottawa Blues Society at the International Blues Challenge, an annual event by the Blues Foundation in Memphis, Tennessee where the band took first place in the band category. Jones also won 'Best Guitarist" honours.

On August 14, 2020, Jones released his 11th album "Sonic Departures" which was partially recorded during COVID-19 lockdown and features a 13-piece horn section. The album debuted at number 4 on the Billboard Blues charts and is nominated for Recording/Producer of the Year at the Maple Blues Awards happening in February 2021.

On February 1, 2021, Jones won Best Jazz/Blues Artist at the Ottawa Awards.

In February 2022, Jones won Best Jazz/Blues Artist at the Ottawa Awards for the second year in a row.

On August 15, 2022, Jimmie Vaughan recorded with Jones, produced by Gordie Johnson (Big Sugar) in Austin, Texas.

In February 2023, Jones won Best Jazz/Blues Artist at the Ottawa Awards for the third year in a row.

On June 28, 2023, Buddy Guy invited Jones to perform with him at the Ottawa Jazz Festival.

On May 26, 2023, Jones released his 12th album "Everything Now" - an all-original album with special guest Jimmie Vaughan, with production by Gordie Johnson of Big Sugar (band) and Eric Eggleston. It includes musicians such as Stanton Moore, Aaron Aterling, Rob McNelley, The Texas Horns. The album was mastered by the legendary Howie Weinberg.

October 17, 2024 - Jones performed at Buddy Guy's Legends in Chicago, where 88 year old Buddy Guy joined the band for several songs. This was the eighth time Jones and Guy have performed together.

In March 2025, Jones won Best Jazz/Blues Artist at the Ottawa Awards for the fourth time in five years.

== Acting and modelling ==
Jones has appeared in various acting roles on television; Bar Rescue (Spike TV) - season 3, episode 20, and commercials; Vinci tablet, Metropolitan Restaurant (Ottawa, Canada). He has done modelling for Indochino Suits and the high-tech company, Unify.

== Awards and nominations ==
Year	Association	Category	Result
1998	R&R Concerts	Battle of the Bands	Won
1999	Blues Guitar Riff-Off	Best Blues Guitarist	Won
2000	Maple Blues Awards	Best New Artist	Nominated
2001	Maple Blues Awards	Best New Artist	Nominated
2002	Maple Blues Awards	Best New Artist	Nominated
2004	Canadian Independent Music Awards	Favourite Blues Artist/Group	Nominated
2004	Maple Blues Awards	Electric Act of the Year	Won
2004	Maple Blues Awards	Recording of the Year - My Kind of Evil	Nominated
2004	Maple Blues Awards	Guitar Player of the Year	Nominated
2004	Maple Blues Awards	Producer of the Year (with Kim Wilson)	Nominated
2006	Maple Blues Awards	Recording of the Year - Kissing in 29 Days	Nominated
2008	XPress Newspaper Awards - Ottawa	Recording of the Year	Nominated
2008	House of Blues Radio Hour	Blues Mobile Award - Recording of the Year	Nominated
2008	Maple Blues Awards	Recording of the Year - Bluelisted	Nominated
2008	Maple Blues Awards	Guitar Player of the Year	Nominated
2008	International Songwriting Contest	Song of the Year - "Looking the World Straight in the Eye"	Nominated
2009	Blues 411 Awards	Best Male Vocalist	Won
2009	Blues 411 Awards	Guitarist of the Year	Nominated
2010	Maple Blues Awards	Recording of the Year - Midnight Memphis Sun	Nominated
2012	Maple Blues Awards	Electric Act of the Year	Nominated
2013	Wasser Prawda Awards	Recording of the Year - Seventh Hour	Nominated
2014	Blues 411 'Jimi' Awards	International Release of the Year - Belmont Boulevard	Nominated
2014	Forty Under 40	Ottawa Business Journal / Chamber of Commerce	Won
2014	Maple Blues Awards	Recording of the Year - Belmont Boulevard	Nominated
2014	Maple Blues Awards	Guitarist of the Year	Nominated
2015	Juno Award	Blues Album of the Year - Belmont Boulevard	Nominated
2017	International Blues Challenge	Best Self-Produced CD Award	Won
2017	Maple Blues Awards	Recording/Producer of the Year - High Temperature with Colin Linden	Nominated
2018	Maple Blues Awards	Electric Act of the Year	Nominated
2019	Independent Blues Awards	Live Album of the Year	Nominated
2020	International Blues Challenge	Best Guitarist	Won
2020	Maple Blues Awards	Recording/Producer of the Year - Sonic Departures with Eric Eggleston	Nominated
2020	Maple Blues Awards	Guitarist of the Year	Nominated
2020	Maple Blues Awards	Entertainer of the Year	Nominated
2020	Maple Blues Awards	Electric Act of the Year	Nominated
2020	Maple Blues Awards	New Artist of the Year (HOROJO Trio)	Nominated
2021	Ottawa Awards	Jazz/Blues Artist of the Year	Won
2021	Capital Music Awards	Artist of the Year	Nominated
2021	Independent Blues Awards	Best Blues Soul Artist	Nominated
2021	Independent Blues Awards	Best Blues Soul CD - Sonic Departures	Nominated
2021	Independent Blues Awards	Best Blues Soul Song - Blue Jean Jacket (Jones, Hambridge, Fleming)	Nominated
2022	Ottawa Awards	Jazz/Blues Artist of the Year	Won
2023	Ottawa Awards	Jazz/Blues Artist of the Year	Won
2025	Ottawa Awards	Jazz/Blues Artist of the Year	Won

== Discography ==
=== Solo releases ===
Year	Title	Genre	Label	Guests / Details
2000	Defibrillatin	Blues	NorthernBlues Music	Pierre Chrétien was a band member for this recording
2002	Bogart's Bounce	Blues	NorthernBlues Music	Kim Wilson (harp, vocals), Gene Taylor (piano), Roxanne Potvin (vocals)
2004	My Kind of Evil	Blues	NorthernBlues Music	Colin James (vocals), Kim Wilson (harp, vocals, producer)
2006	Kissing in 29 Days	Blues	NorthernBlues Music	David "Fathead" Newman (saxophone)
2008	Bluelisted	Blues	NorthernBlues Music	Little Charlie Baty (guitar, harp), Junior Watson (guitar), Richard Innes (drums), Larry Taylor (bass); Liner notes by Dan Aykroyd
2010	Midnight Memphis Sun	Blues	NorthernBlues Music	Hubert Sumlin (guitar), Charlie Musselwhite (harmonica), Richard Innes (drums), Larry Taylor (bass)
2012	Seventh Hour	Blues	Solid Blues Records	Mixed by Steve Dawson at Black Hen Music
2014	Belmont Boulevard	Blues	Blind Pig Records	Produced by Tom Hambridge
2016	High Temperature	Blues	Solid Blues Records	Produced by Colin Linden
2018	LIVE	Blues	Solid Blues Records	Produced by JW-Jones and Zach Allen
2020	Sonic Departures	Blues	Solid Blues Records	Produced by JW-Jones and Eric Eggleston
2023	Everything Now	Blues	Solid Blues Records	Special Guests Jimmie Vaughan, Stanton Moore, Aaron Sterling, The Texas Horns, Rob McNelly, Produced by Gordie Johnson (of Big Sugar)
