= One Guitar Woman =

2024 album by Sue Foley

Studio album by Sue Foley
- Released: March 29, 2024
- Genre: Blues
- Label: Stony Plain
- Producer: Mike Flanigin

Sue Foley chronology
Pinky's Blues (2021)	One Guitar Woman (2024)

One Guitar Woman is an album by Sue Foley. It was released on March 29, 2024. The front cover states that it is "A tribute to the female pioneers of the guitar".

One Guitar Woman was nominated for a Grammy Award for Best Traditional Blues Album. It won in the 'Acoustic Album of the Year' category at the Blues Music Awards ceremony in 2025.

== Track listing ==
1. "Oh Babe It Ain't No Lie" (Elizabeth Cotten) – 4:15
2. "In My Girlish Days" (Ernest Lawlars) – 3:55
3. "Lonesome Homesick Blues" (Maybelle Carter) – 3:53
4. "Mal Hombre" (Lydia Mendoza, Sue Foley) – 4:27
5. "Motherless Child Blues" (Elvie Thomas) – 4:33
6. "Romance in A Minor" (Niccolo Paganini, arranged by Sue Foley) – 4:24
7. "My Journey to the Sky" (Rosetta Tharpe) – 2:50
8. "Nothing in Rambling" (Minnie Lawlers) – 3:05
9. "Maybelle's Guitar" (Sue Foley) – 3:05
10. "Freight Train" (Elizabeth Cotten) – 3:37
11. "Last Kind Words Blues" (Geeshie Wiley) – 4:04
12. "La Malagueña" (Ernesto Lecuona, arranged by Sue Foley) – 4:35

== Personnel ==
- Sue Foley – guitar, vocals

Production

- Produced by Mike Flanigin
- Recording, mixing: Chris Bell
- Assistant engineer: John Ziola
- Mastering: Oli Morgan
- Photography: Mark Abernathy, Scott Doubt
