= Love Comin' Down =

Studio album by Sue Foley
- Released: 2000
- Studio: Bathouse
- Genre: Blues
- Length: 48:33
- Label: Shanachie
- Producer: Colin Linden

Sue Foley chronology
| Ten Days in November (1998) | Love Comin' Down (2000) | Back to the Blues (2000) |

Love Comin' Down is an album by the Canadian musician Sue Foley, released in 2000. She supported it with a North American tour. The album won a Maple Blues Award for recording of the year, as well as a Juno Award for best blues album.

== Production ==
Produced by Colin Linden, the album was recorded at Bathouse Recording Studio. Many of the songs were inspired by Foley's divorce. Lucinda Williams contributed backing vocals to "Empty Cup". "Oh Baby (We Got a Good Thing Goin')" is a cover of the song made famous by Barbara Lynn; Foley had toured with Lynn in the early 1990s. "Same Thing" was written by Willie Dixon. "You're Barkin' Up the Wrong Tree" is a cover of the Freddie King song. "Mediterranean Breakfast" is an instrumental.

== Critical reception ==
Professional ratings
Review scores
| Source | Rating |
|---|---|
| DownBeat | 4/5 stars |
| The Penguin Guide to Blues Recordings | 3/4 stars |

The Charleston Gazette wrote that "Foley's scratchy voice has a raw, sexy swagger tempered with traces of Nina Simone-style cool." The Province said that Foley "coos, barks, howls and plain soars with a newfound vocal confidence while her guitar burns through every track." The Vancouver Sun noted that, "while some blues-oriented artists ultimately decide to glaze their sound with a radio-friendly gloss, Foley's wailing vocals and sepia-tinged blues standards continue to kick dirt in the generic face of the mainstream."

The Daily Gleaner concluded that Foley's "picking has never been better, and her singing has never been more convincing in its rare combination of tenderness and fury." The New York Times called Love Comin' Down a "fine, swampy album". The Hartford Courant stated that the songs "have a vintage, uncluttered feel—there are no fancy studio tricks, just solid musicianship".

== Track listing ==
| No. | Title | Length |
|---|---|---|
| 1. | "Two Trains" | 4:32 |
| 2. | "Empty Cup" | 4:46 |
| 3. | "Love Comin' Down" | 4:20 |
| 4. | "You're Barkin' Up the Wrong Tree" | 3:27 |
| 5. | "Same Thing" | 5:34 |
| 6. | "Let My Tears Fall Down" | 3:12 |
| 7. | "Let Me Drive" | 2:39 |
| 8. | "To Be Next to You" | 4:09 |
| 9. | "Mediterranean Breakfast" | 4:29 |
| 10. | "Am I Worthy" | 2:52 |
| 11. | "Oh Baby (We Got a Good Thing Goin')" | 4:43 |
| 12. | "How Strong" | 3:50 |
| Total length: | | 48:33 |
