= The Way It Feels (Roxanne Potvin album) =

Studio album by Roxanne Potvin
- Released: 2006
- Recorded: 2005
- Genre: Blues
- Label: Alert Canada
- Producer: Colin Linden

Roxanne Potvin chronology
Careless Loving (2003)	The Way It Feels (2006)	No Love for the Poisonous (2008)

Professional ratings
Review scores
Source	Rating
AllMusic	4/5 stars

The Way It Feels is Canadian blues singer/musician Roxanne Potvin's second album, released in 2006. The album includes contributions from a wide range of players, including producer Colin Linden, John Hiatt, Bruce Cockburn and members of the Fairfield Four and the Memphis Horns. Eight of the songs on the CD were written by Potvin who also plays electric and acoustic lead guitar.

== Track listing ==
All songs are written by Roxanne Potvin, except where noted.

1. "A Love That's Simple" – 3:35
2. "I Want To (Do Everything for You)" (Joe Tex) – 3:11
3. "Hurting Child" – 3:43
4. "Caught Up" – 3:22
5. "La Merveille" – 2:34
6. "While I Wait for You" – 3:36
7. "Your Love Keeps Working On Me" (Beverly Bridge, Sonny Thompson) – 3:22
8. "Say It" (Lowman Pauling) – 2:38
9. "Don't Pay Attention" – 3:18
10. "Sweet Thoughts of You" – 3:52
11. "Let It Feel the Way It Feels" – 4:35
12. "Break Away" (Jackie DeShannon) – 3:51

== Personnel ==
- Roxanne Potvin – Guitar (Acoustic), Vocals, Guitar (Rhythm), Guitar (Electric), Harmony, Soloist, Harmony Vocals, Handclapping, Piano
- Mark Winchester – Bass, Bass (Upright)
- Joe Rice – Vocals (Background)
- Tom McGinley – Sax (Baritone)
- Bryan Owings – Percussion, Handclapping, Drums
- Robert Hamlett – Vocals (Background)
- Paul Aucoin – Vibraphone
- J.D. Fizer – Vocals (Background)
- Mark W. Winchester – Bass, Bass (Upright)
- Bob Babbitt – Bass, Bass (Upright)
- Wayne Jackson – Trombone, Trumpet
- Daniel Lanois – Vocals, Guest Appearance
- Colin Linden – Guitar (Acoustic), Guitar (Baritone), Engineer, Guitar (Electric), Dobro, Mandolin
- Bruce Cockburn – Guitar (Electric), Guest Appearance
- John Hiatt – Harmony Vocals, Guest Appearance, Harmony

Production

- Colin Linden – Producer
- W. Tom Berry – Executive Producer, Management
- John Whynot – Producer, Engineer, Mixing
- Rodney Bowes – Package Design
- Andrew MacNaughtan – Photography
- Joao Carvalho – Mastering
- Jonathan Stinson – Assistant Engineer, Mixing Assistant
- Jeremy Darby – Assistant Engineer, Mixing Assistant
