= David Rotundo =

Canadian musician

David Rotundo (fl. 1991–2017) is a Canadian blues harp player and band leader. When he was beginning his study of the instrument, he toured to many of the major blues cities in the U.S (e.g., Chicago), which exposed him to many regional blues playing styles. He cites James Cotton as a major influence. In 2000, he joined the Jack de Keyzer Band. His album, Blowin' for Broke, won the MapleBlues Award for "Best New Artist of The Year" in 2002.
