= Sue Foley =

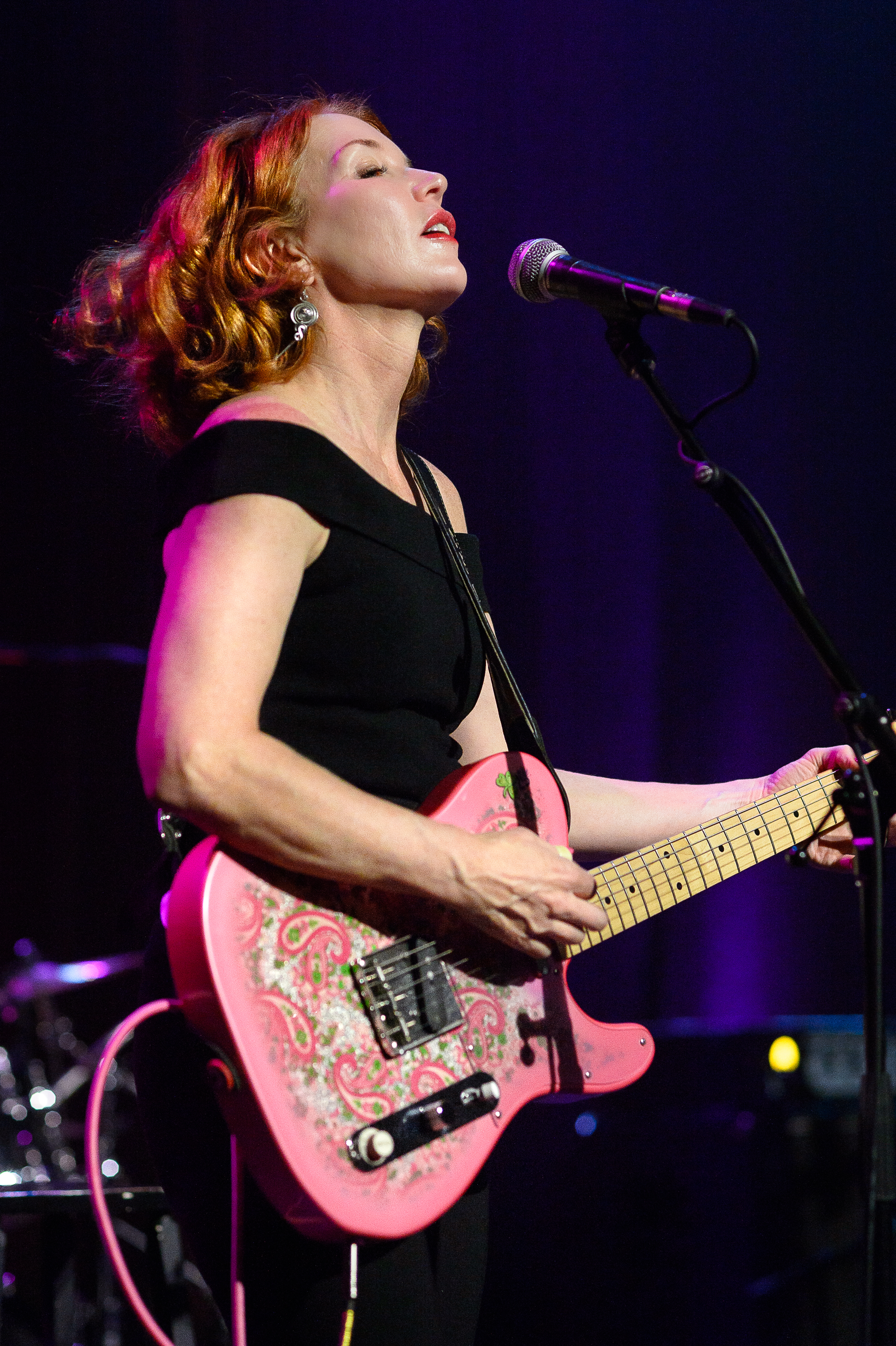
- Sue Foley Live 2024

Background information
- Born: March 29, 1968 (age 58)
- Origin: Ottawa, Ontario, Canada
- Genre: Blues
- Occupations: Musician, singer
- Instrument: Guitar
- Labels: Warner Music Canada; Koch; New West; Antone's; Shanachie; Ruf; Blind Pig
- Website: Suefoley.com

Sue Foley (born March 29, 1968) is a Canadian blues guitarist and singer/songwriter known for her Texas blues style and acoustic touch. A five-time Blues Music Award winner for Traditional Blues Female, and a Juno recipient, she has shared the stage with musicians including B.B. King and Buddy Guy. In 2024 she released One Guitar Woman: A Tribute to The Female Pioneers of Guitar which earned a 2025 Grammy Award nomination for Best Traditional Blues Album. Foley also holds a PhD in Musicology, and is the author of the forthcoming book Guitar Women, exploring the lives and legacies of trailblazing female guitarists.

== Early life ==
Foley was born in Ottawa, Ontario, and spent her early childhood in Canada. She learned to play guitar at age 13, became interested in blues music from listening to the Rolling Stones, and played her first gig at age 16. While still in high school, she played guitar with Back Alley John in the Ottawa area and together they recorded a single as The Blue Lights. After high school graduation, she relocated to Vancouver where she formed the Sue Foley Band and toured Canada.

== Career ==
In 1988–1989, the Sue Foley Band teamed with Mark Hummel to tour across the United States, Canada, and Europe as well as recording an album. The collaboration lasted a little over a year with 300 dates on the road in 1989. Clifford Antone saw Foley sitting in with Duke Robillard while the band was in Memphis for the W.C. Handy Awards that year. By the age of 21, Foley had relocated to Austin, Texas, where she began recording for Antone's Records. Her first release was Young Girl Blues.

In 2001, Foley won the Juno Award for her CD, Love Comin' Down. Over the course of her career, Foley has earned seventeen Maple Blues Awards and three Trophees de Blues de France, and multiple awards at the Blues Music Awards in Memphis, Tennessee.

In 2018, Foley released the album, The Ice Queen, which featured guest appearances by Billy Gibbons of ZZ Top and Jimmie Vaughan.

In 2024, Foley released the album One Guitar Woman, a solo acoustic tribute to the female pioneers of guitar. The album was nominated for a 2025 Grammy Award for Best Traditional Blues Album. The same year she won her fifth consecutive Koko Taylor Award (Traditional Blues Female Artist) at the 2025 Blues Music Awards ceremony.

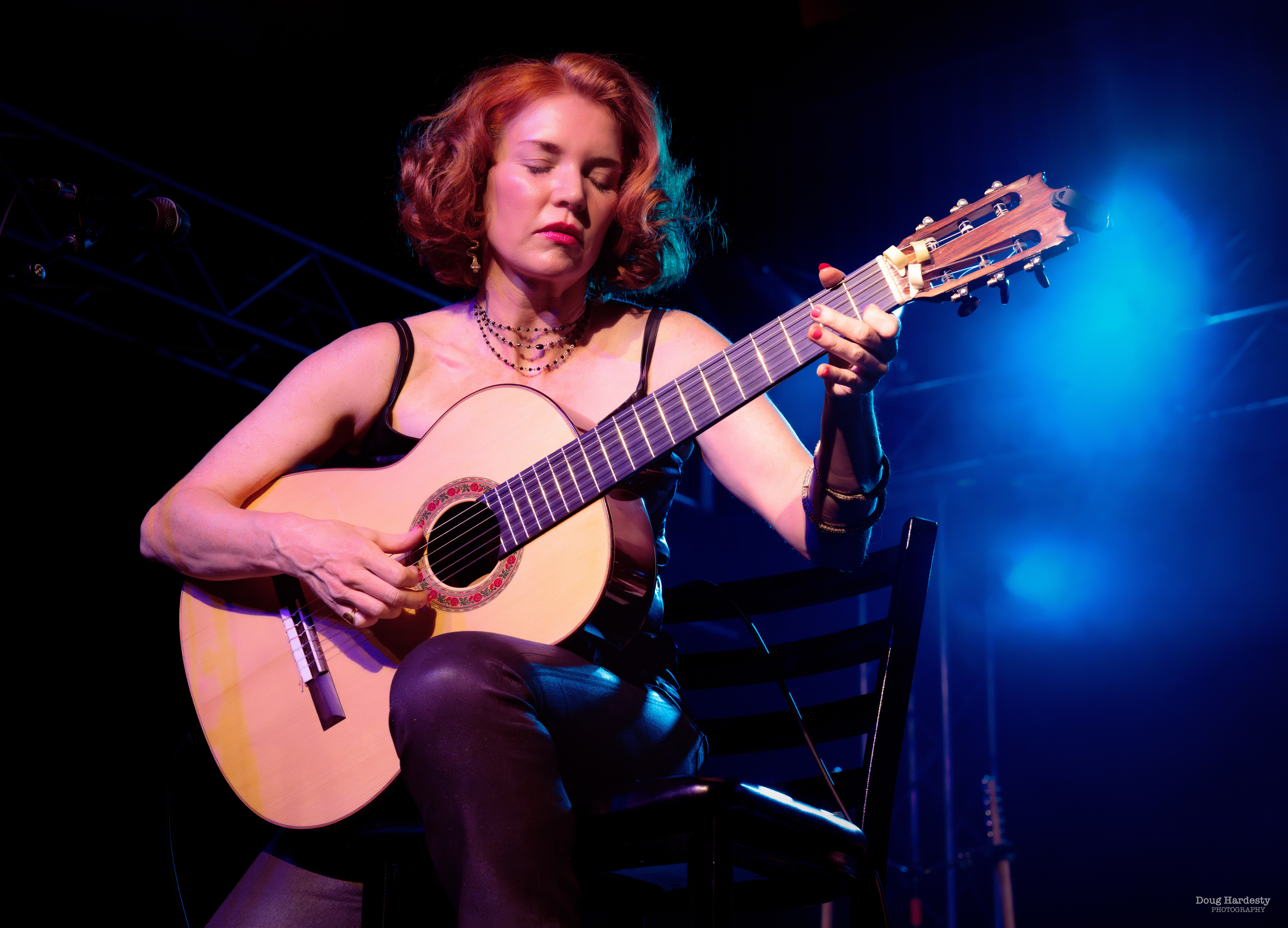
Sue Foley 2023

Sue Foley 2023

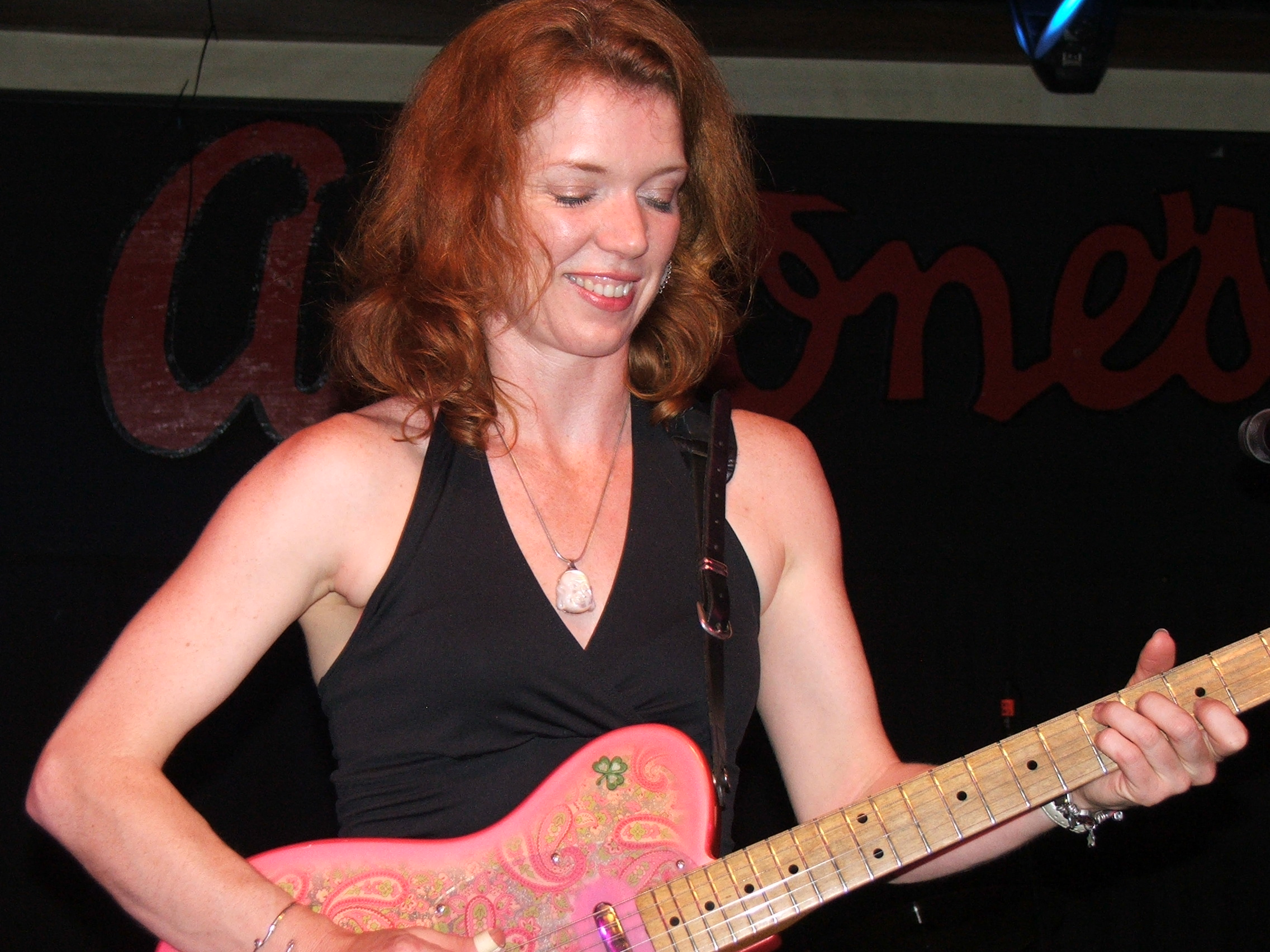
Sue Foley - Antone's in Austin, TX (2007)

== Discography ==
=== As primary artist ===
- 1992: Young Girl Blues (Antone's)
- 1993: Without a Warning (Antone's)
- 1995: Big City Blues (Antone's)
- 1996: Walk in the Sun (Antone's)
- 1998: Ten Days in November (Shanachie)
- 2000: Love Comin' Down (Shanachie)
- 2000: Back to the Blues [also released as Secret Weapon] (Antone's)
- 2002: Where the Action Is... (Shanachie)
- 2004: Change (Ruf)
- 2006: New Used Car (Ruf)
- 2018: The Ice Queen (Stony Plain 1398; Dixiefrog 8803)
- 2021: Pinky's Blues (Stony Plain 1430)
- 2023: "Live in Austin Vol.1" (Guitar Woman Records)
- 2024: One Guitar Woman, A Tribute to The Female Pioneers of Guitar

=== As primary artist on other albums and collaborations ===
- 1991: Various Artists – KLBJ FM's Local Licks Live 1990 (KLBJ) – track 15, "Walking Home"
- 1994: Various Artists – Brace Yourself! A Tribute To Otis Blackwell (Shanachie) – track 11, "Great Balls Of Fire" with Joe Ely
- 1995: Various Artists – Bluesiana Hurricane (Shanachie) featuring R&B Legends: Rufus Thomas, Bill Doggett, Jazz Legends: Lester Bowie, Bobby Watson, Rock Legends: Chuck Rainey, Will Calhoun
- 2000: Various Artists – Public Domain (Purchase) – track 3, "Going Away Blues"
- 2000: Various Artists – Dealin' With the Devil: Songs of Robert Johnson (Cannonball) – track 7, "From Four Until Late"
- 2002: The Blues: From Yesterday's Masters To Today's Cutting Edge (American Roots Songbook Series), (Shanachie, as licensed to St. Clair Entertainment)
- 2002: Various Artists – Preachin' the Blues: The Music of Mississippi Fred McDowell (Telarc) – track 8, "Frisco Line"
- 2003: Various Artists – Blues On Blonde On Blonde (Telarc) – track 2, "Most Likely You'll Go Your Way And I'll Go Mine"
- 2006: Saturday Night Blues: 20 Years, (CBC/Universal Music Group)
- 2009: Queen Bee: The Antone's Collection (Floating World) compilation
- 2007: Time Bomb (with Deborah Coleman, Roxanne Potvin) (Ruf)
- 2010: He Said She Said (with Peter Karp) (Blind Pig)
- 2012: Beyond the Crossroads (with Peter Karp) (Blind Pig)
- 2025: Antone's 50th All Stars. The Last Real Texas Blues Album (New West)

=== As guest musician on other albums ===
- 1989: Mark Hummel – Up and Jumpin' with the Sue Foley Band and guest: Charles Brown, (Rockinitus Records)
- 1994: Mark Hummel – Feel Like Rockin' (Flying Fish / Rounder)
- 1995: Wayne Hancock – Thunderstorms and Neon Signs (Dejadisc)
- 1998: Lazy Lester – All Over You (Antone's)
- 1999: The Tony D Band Featuring Special Guest Sue Foley – Live Like Hell (Diesel Management Productions)
- 2001: Lazy Lester – Blues Stop Knockin' (Antone's)
- 2003: Big Dave McLean – Blues from the Middle (Stony Plain)
- 2004: Blackie and the Rodeo Kings – Bark (True North)
- 2007: Candye Kane – Guitar'd and Feathered (Ruf Records)
- 2007: Michael Jerome Browne – Double (Borealis)
- 2007: Southside Steve Marriner – Going Up (Dog My Cat)
- 2013: Lee Holmes – Sit Down Blues (Itsa Music Co.)

== Bibliography / writing ==
- (2021-2025): Contributing writer for Guitar Player Magazine featuring articles on various female guitarists
- (2024): Contributing writer The Cambridge Companion to the Electric Guitar (Steve Waksman, Jan-Peter Herbst) Cambridge University Press
- (2026): Guitar Women Sutherland House Publishing

== Filmography / guitar instructional series ==
- 2005: Sue Foley - Live in Europe (Ruf) DVD
- 2010: Sue Foley - Guitar Woman (Alfred's Artist Series/Instructional) DVD
- 2025: Truefire Instructional Series
