= My Kind of Evil =

Studio album by JW-Jones
- Released: 2004

My Kind Of Evil is the third album by blues guitarist, singer, and bandleader JW-Jones. Released in 2004, it was produced by multi-Grammy nominee Kim Wilson (singer for The Fabulous Thunderbirds) and featured fellow Canadian Colin James on two tracks.

Professional ratings
Review scores
Source	Rating
The Penguin Guide to Blues Recordings	3/4 stars
AllMusic	3/5 stars

== Personnel ==
- JW-Jones - guitar, vocals
- Rick Rangno - trumpet
- Brian Asselin - tenor saxophone
- Steve Trecarten - tenor saxophone
- Frank Scanga - baritone saxophone
- Kim Wilson - harmonica, vocals
- Geoff Daye - organ, piano
- Nathan Morris - bass
- Bill Brennan - drums
- Colin James - vocals
- Roxanne Potvin - vocals
