= Richard Innes =

Scottish cricketer

Richard Innes (born 31 August 1953 (age 71)) was a Scottish cricketer. He was a right-handed batsman and a right-arm medium-fast bowler who played for Norfolk. He was born in Aberdeen.

Innes, who made his debut cricketing appearance for Norfolk Young Amateurs at the age of 17, made his Minor Counties Championship debut eight seasons later, where he played for Norfolk for four seasons.

Innes made his sole List A appearance in the NatWest Trophy competition of 1983, against Glamorgan. From the tailend, he scored 0 not out, and took figures of 0-34 from 11 overs with the ball.
