= Little Charlie & the Nightcats =

American band

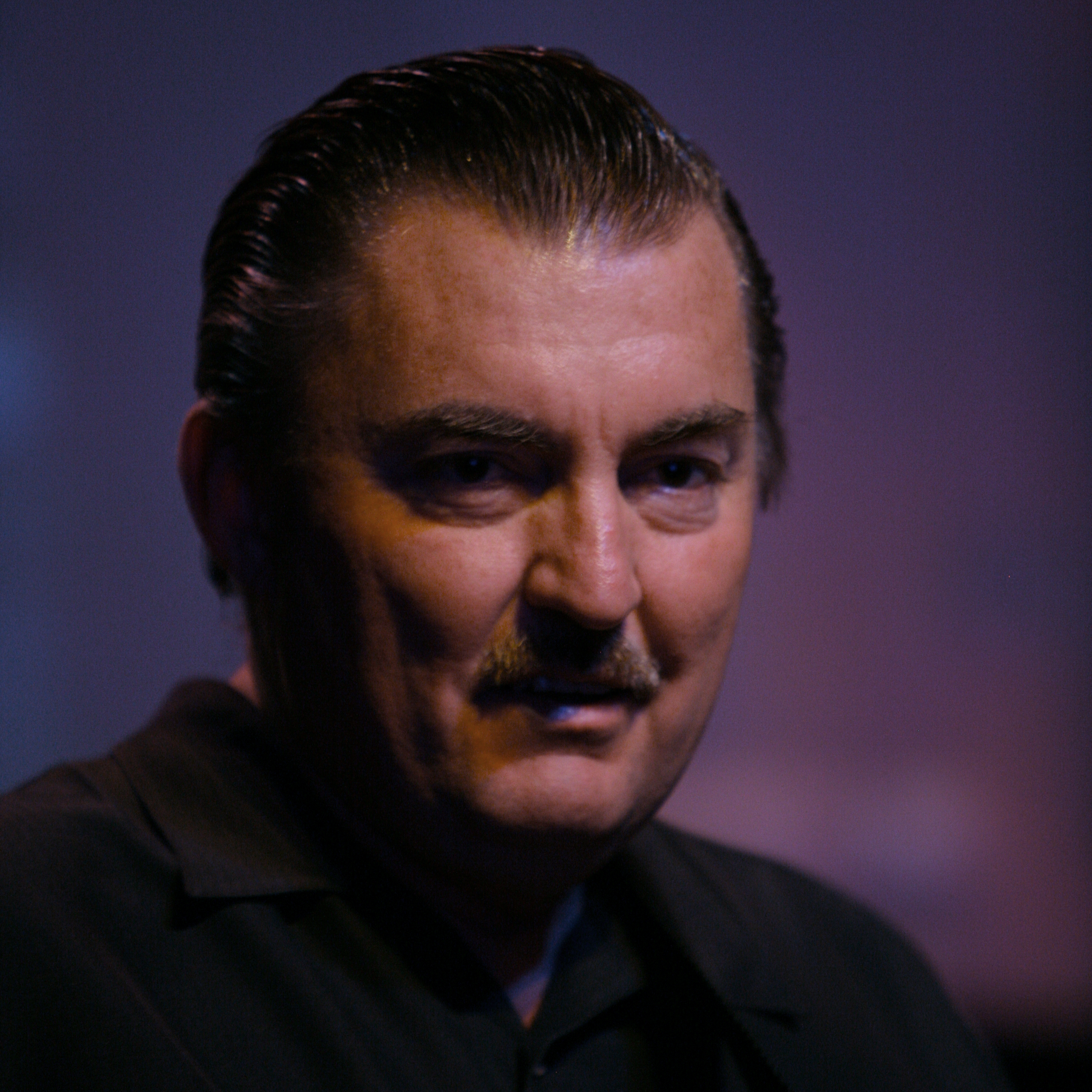
- Charles (Little Charlie) Baty in San Diego, 2007

Background information
- Origin: Sacramento, California, United States
- Genres: Electric blues, West Coast blues, jump blues, swing revival
- Instrument(s): Guitar, harmonica, bass, drums
- Years active: 1976–2008
- Labels: Alligator Records
- Past members: Charlie Baty (deceased); Jay Peterson (deceased); Liz VanHouten (Peele); Dobie Strange; Brad Lee Sexton (died 1995); Ronnie James Weber; June Core; Frankie Randall; Joey Ventittelli; Fletcher Fox; Gerald (Jerry) Eddleman; J. Hansen; Kid Andersen; Rick Estrin; Lorenzo Farrell; D'Mar(Derrick Martin)

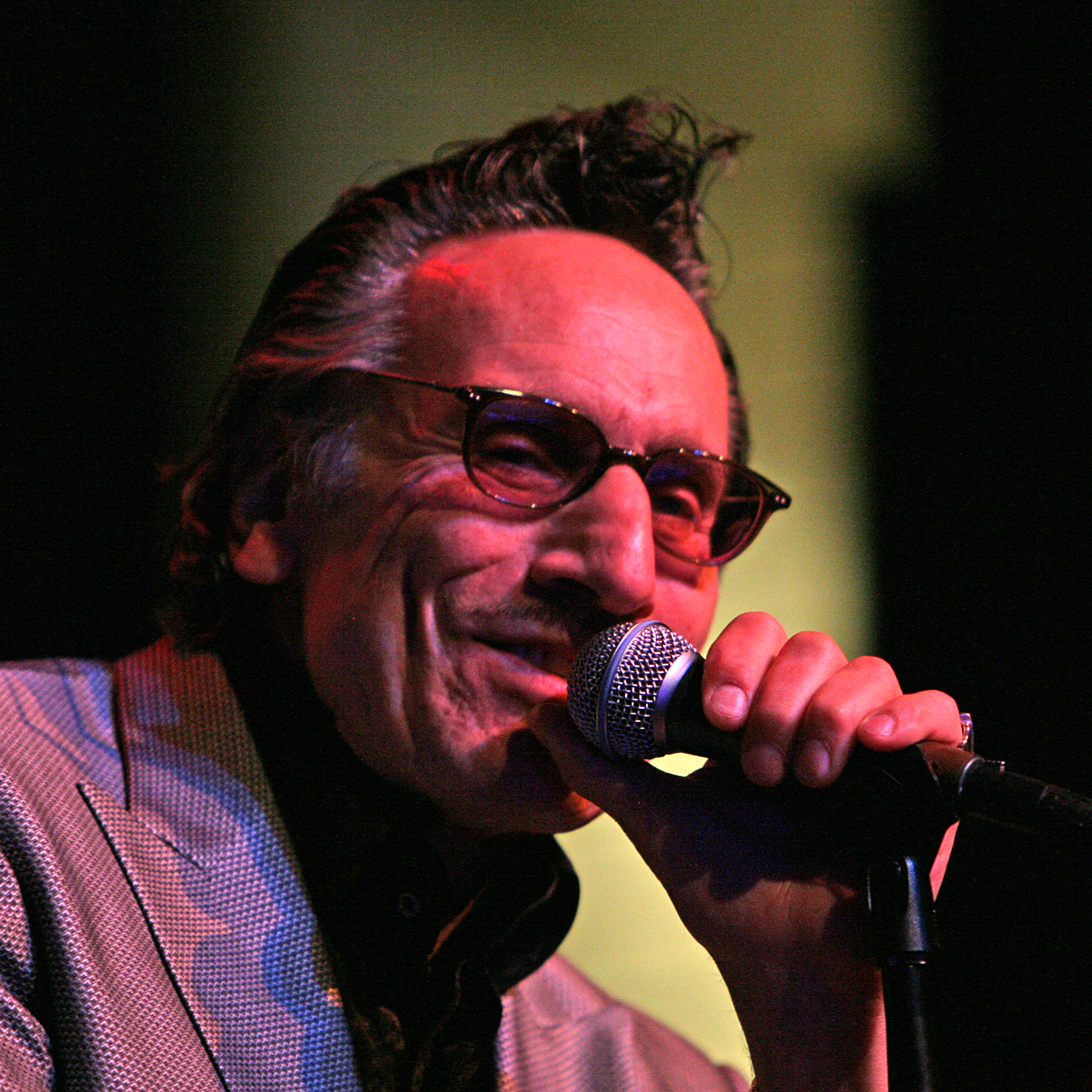
Rick Estrin in San Diego, 2007

Little Charlie & the Nightcats was an American electric blues and swing revival combo, active from 1976-2008. Several members reformed as Rick Estrin & The Nightcats.

== Biography ==
Charles Baty (1953–2020) was studying mathematics at University of California Berkeley when he and Rick Estrin (born 1949) formed Little Charlie & the Nightcats in 1976. Their first album, All the Way Crazy, was issued in 1987. It includes the songs "Poor Tarzan", "Suicide Blues" and "When Girls Do It". The following album, Disturbing the Peace (1988), included "That's My Girl", "My Money's Green", "She's Talking" and "Nervous". They began touring in the United States and internationally. They played at the San Francisco Blues Festival in 1980 and 1982, the Montreal International Jazz Festival, the San Diego Street Scene, Seattle's Bumbershoot Festival and the Juneau Jazz & Classics Festival in 2002.

Their 1993 album, Night Vision, was produced by Joe Louis Walker, who also performed on it. The album included "My Next Ex-Wife," which won a W.C. Handy Award for Song of the Year. The band's drummer, Dobie Strange, was replaced by June Core in 1996.

In early 2008, Baty announced he was entering "soft" retirement and no longer toured with the band, except for reunion tours and shows in Europe and select North American festivals. Baty performed with JW-Jones at the Mont Tremblant Blues Festival, Ottawa Bluesfest, and Piazza Blues in Bellinzona, Switzerland, in July 2009. Estrin continued with the band, which was renamed Rick Estrin & The Nightcats. Baty was replaced on guitar by Chris "Kid" Andersen (born 1980), originally from Telemark, Norway. Andersen had backed Charlie Musselwhite and Terry Hanck, and had fronted his own band.

Baty's most recent blues recording was as a guest on JW-Jones's Bluelisted (2008), an album which marked the first time in his career that he documented his harmonica playing on a recording and the first time he and another West Coast blues musician, Junior Watson, had recorded together on the same tracks.

In 2013, Estrin was nominated for a Blues Music Award in the category B.B. King Entertainer. He was nominated again in 2014 for the same award, and the ensemble was nominated for Band of the Year.

Charlie Baty died on March 6, 2020, aged 66, in Vacaville, California following a heart attack.

== Selected discography ==
Year	Title	Genre	Label
1987	All the Way Crazy	Jazz, blues	Alligator Records
1988	Disturbing the Peace	Jazz, blues	Alligator Records
1989	The Big Break	Jazz, blues	Alligator Records
1991	Captured Live	Jazz, blues	Alligator Records
1993	Night Vision	Jazz, blues	Alligator Records
1995	Straight Up!	Jazz, blues	Alligator Records
1997	Deluxe Edition (compilation)	Jazz, blues	Alligator Records
1998	Shadow of the Blues	Jazz, blues	Alligator Records
2002	That's Big!	Jazz, blues	Alligator Records
2005	Nine Lives	Jazz, blues	Alligator Records
