= Ted Leonard (Canadian musician) =

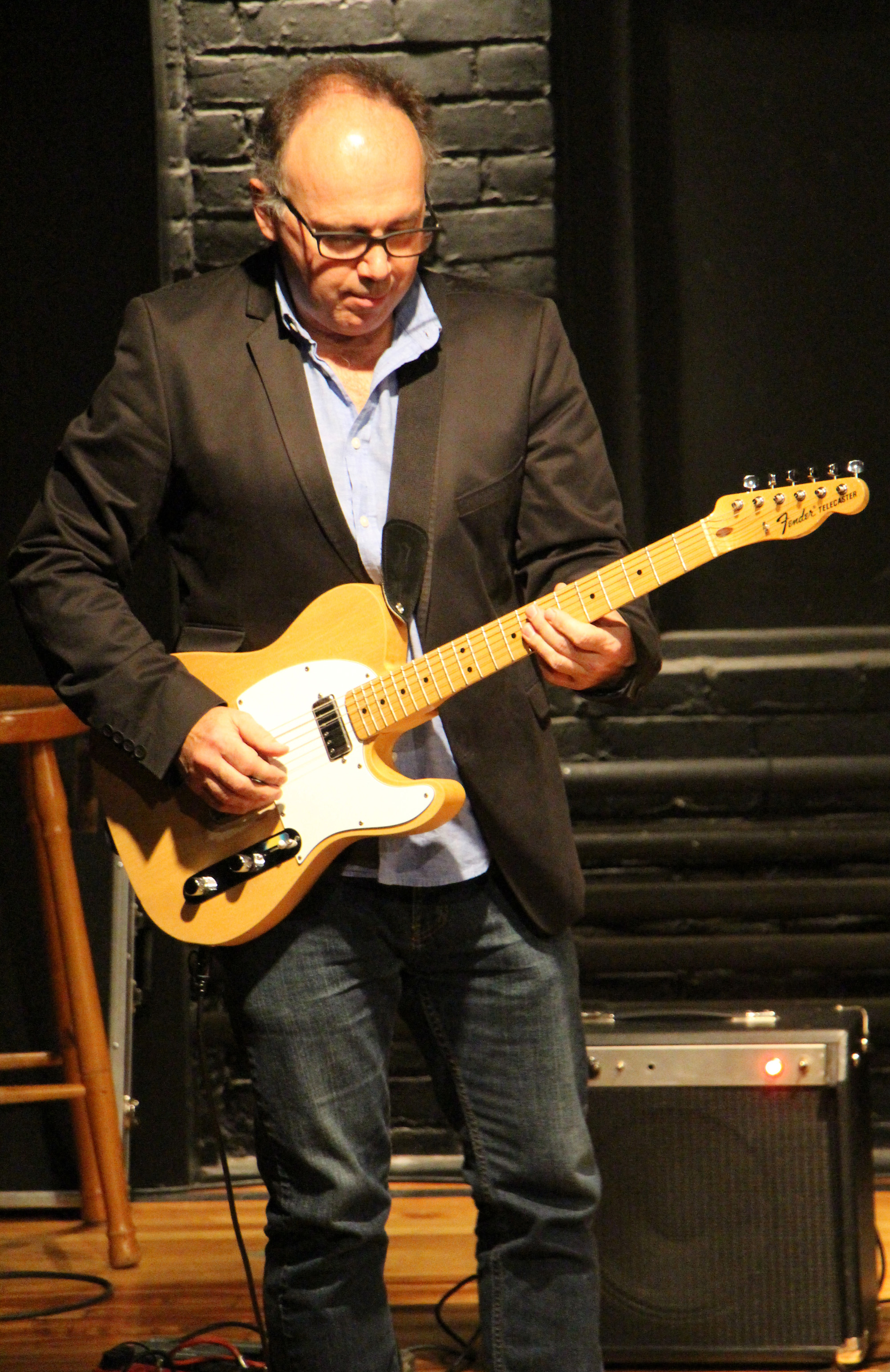
- Leonard in 2015

Background information
- Genres: Blues, Canadian blues, blues rock
- Occupations: Musician, guitarist
- Instrument: Electric guitar
- Years active: 1977–present

Ted "Teddy" Leonard is a Canadian blues musician, multi-instrumentalist, producer and vocalist. He is best known for his long standing association with the Canadian blues band Fathead and has been a working professional musician since 1977.

== Early life ==
Leonard was born in Toronto into a musical family, and was one of eleven children. His mother a veteran singer over 25 years in the Toronto Mendelssohn Choir and his father was three years a drum major at De La Salle College Catholic Secondary School, which was renamed to De La Salle College. Leonard's parents offered for him to take music instruction which he declined as he did not want to play to a set form of music curriculum, he wanted to play the music of his choice. Norm, his brother would loan him his first guitar, a Kay Archtop.

== Music career ==
=== Early career: 1977–early 1980s ===
After sitting in with a group of professional musicians at a matinee jam in London, Ontario, was the first time Leonard wanted to pursue a career as a professional musician. In the outset, he performed with a local band called Soul Sausage then later became the sideman for Juno Award winner, Morgan Davis. Leonard has shared the stage with B. B. King, Robbie Robertson, Garth Hudson and Rick Danko of The Band and played a tour with blues musician Colin Linden.

=== Kendall Wall Band: late 1980s–1990s ===
In the late 1980s after filling in many times for guitarist Mike McKenna, Leonard joined as the guitarist for the Kendall Wall Band, providing him the experience of performing with a house band at the Black Swan in Toronto, Ontario. This created the opportunity to perform with some of the well respected in blues music in Canada and Internationally.

The Kendall Wall Band arrived at a time when it was a crucial period for blues music in Canada, let alone in the city of Toronto. They provided upcoming musicians the opportunity to perform with a working band then, when International and Canadian blues musicians came to town to play the Black Swan they had the Kendall Wall Band backing them up.

Teddy performed with blues musicians from Canadian and International destinations on the short list such as Eddie Shaw, Carey Bell, Fenton Robinson, Luther "Guitar Junior" Johnson, Snooky Pryor, Big Jay McNealy, Honkin' Joe Houston, Phil Guy, Morgan Davis, Johnny V Mills and Cash McCall. Notably, Leonard also backed Hubert Sumlin alongside Morgan Davis during this time portion of his career.

=== Fathead: 1992–2008 ===
In 1992, Leonard became one of the founding members of the Fathead Canadian blues band. In 1995, he received his first award with the Fathead band, the West Coast Blues Award, for Top Canadian Blues Recording. Then in 1997 the band received both the Jazz Report Award, for Blues Group of the Year and the Maple Blues Award for Electric Act of the Year.

Leonard is a Maple Blues Award winner as guitarist of the year and a Juno Award winner with the Fathead band for their album, Blues Weather receiving both in 1999 in that same year, the Fathead band won two more awards, the Maple Blues Award for, Electric Act of the Year and the Jazz Report Award for, Blues Group of the Year. The Jazz Report Awards began in the early 1990s, also known as the Canadian Jazz Awards/National Jazz Awards were cancelled in 2010, marking the end of a national award providing recognition throughout the country to the jazz musicians.

In 2001, Leonard joined and has remained a member of The Maple Blues Revue, which was formed by Gary Kendall and Pat Carey. This eleven member group of Canadian blues musicians whom are all multiple Maple Blues Award winners or nominees, perform at the annual Maple Blues Awards Ceremony in Toronto, Ontario and have released one recording, Live at Twisted Pines.

In 2003, he received with the Fathead band the Canadian Indie Award, for Blues Recording of the Year for their song, "First Class Riff-Raff".

In 2006, Leonard left the Fathead band and embarked on a career as a freelance musician touring throughout North America and Europe performing with blues musicians such as Paul Reddick, and Pork Belly Futures.

=== 2009–present ===
In 2009, Leonard would leave a freelance career and rejoin the Fathead band. Leonard received two more awards in 2010, the first from the Great Lakes Blues Society, the Lifetime Achievement Award recognizing his involvement in Canadian blues music and The Jimmy Lewis Award, presented by the city of London, Ontario, a lifetime achievement award recognizing his long career as a blues musician.

In 2012 with the release of a greatest hits album a concert documentary video is included capturing 20 years of the members in the Fathead band, including their guitar ace Leonard. This will be the second documentary Leonard has been interviewed and involved in with the release of the recent documentary video in 2015 outlining the history of the Kendall Wall Band.

Along with his tenure with Fathead, he has recorded with Big Daddy G, Rita Chiarelli and Little Mack Simmonds. Leonard continued to perform with the Fathead band until leaving in 2013. In addition to his recorded work, Leonard continues to perform live with notable Canadian Blues acts, including The Hogtown All Stars, Chris Murphy, and The Maple Blues Band. Leonard also serves as lead guitarist for Erin McCallum, and remains in high demand as a freelance player.

== Musical styles and legacy ==
Leonard has been a guitarist in the Canadian blues and roots scene for more than 40 years, is a self-taught musician developing his own style and form of the blues music sound. He spent 18 years with the Fathead blues band and today continues a career as a freelance musician. He has contributed to the work of, and remains performing live with, other noted bands such as; The Hogtown Allstars, The Maple Blues Band, Erin McCallum, David Vest, and many more.

== Awards and recognition ==
West Coast Blues Award

- 1995 Top Canadian Blues Recording – Fathead

Jazz Report Award

- 1997 Blues Group of The Year – Fathead
- 1999 Blues Group of the Year – Fathead

Maple Blues Award

- 1997 Electric Act of The Year – Fathead
- 1999 Guitarist of the Year
- 1999 Electric Act of the Year – Fathead

Juno Award

- 1999 Best Blues Album – Blues Weather – Fathead

Canadian Indie Award

- 2003 Blues Recording of the Year – First Class Riff-Raff – Fathead

The Jimmy Lewis Award

- 2010 Lifetime Achievement

Great Lakes Blues Society Award

- 2010 Lifetime Achievement

== Discography ==
=== With Fathead ===
Studio albums

- 1995: Fathead
- 1998: Blues Weather
- 2000: Where's Your Head At?
- 2002: First Class Riff-Raff
- 2002: Livelier Than Ever!
- 2010: Where's The Blues Taking Me
- 2012: Twenty Years Deep

=== With Michael Pickett ===
- 1998: Blues Money

=== With the Maple Blues Revue ===
- 2008: Live at Twisted Pines

=== With David Vest ===
- 2012: East Meets Vest

=== With the Kendall Wall Band ===
- 2013: The Way We Was

=== With The Kat Kings ===
- 2016: Swingin' in the Swamp
