= Kendall Wall Band =

Canadian blues band

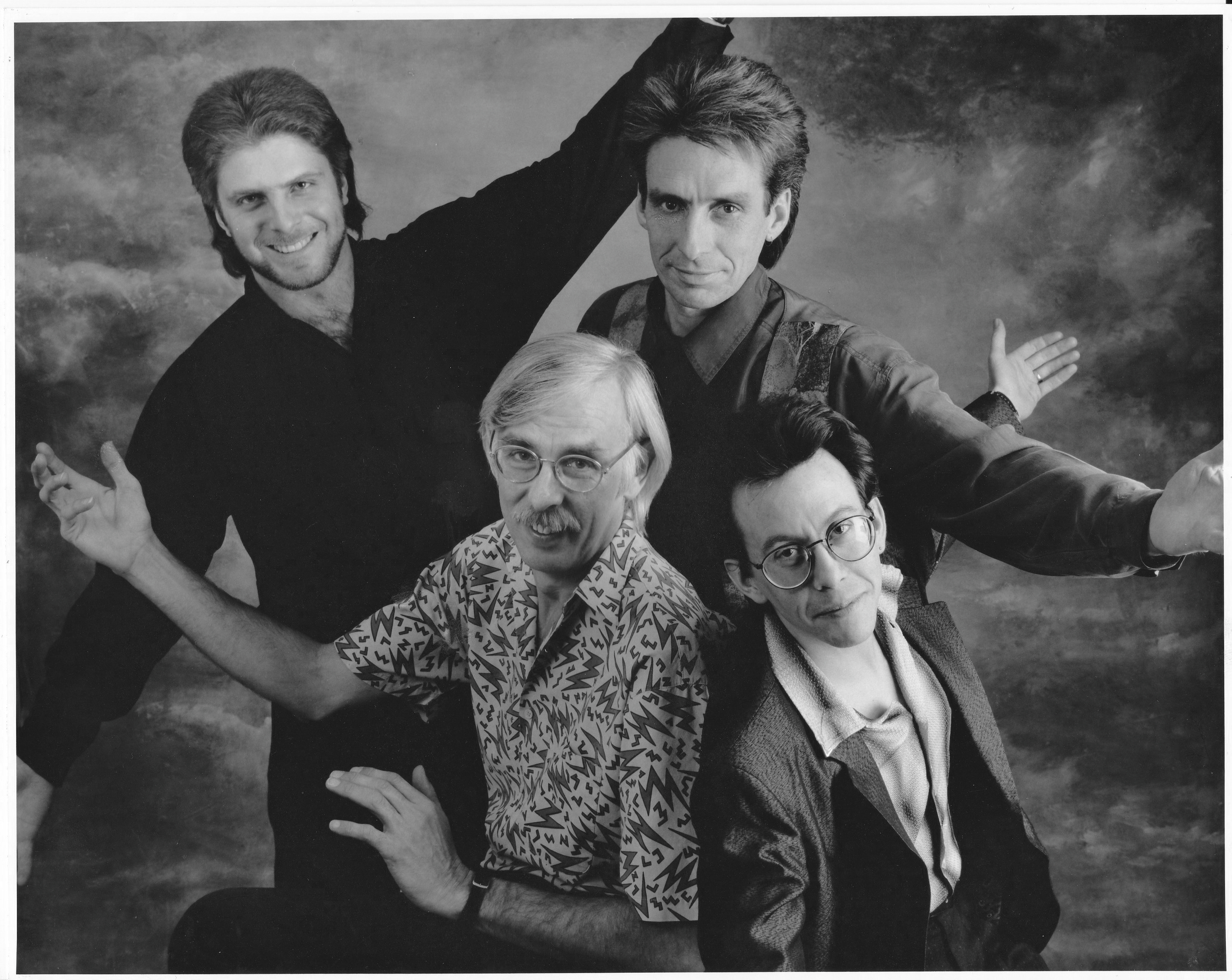
- LR: Chris Burgess, Gary Kendall, LF: Cash Wall, Jeff Baker

Background information
- Also known as: Kendall Wall Blues Band
- Genres: Blues, Canadian blues, Blues rock
- Years active: 1983 – 1993
- Past members: Cash Wall; Gary Kendall; Jeff Baker; Ted Leonard; Richard Smyth; Martin Alex Aucoin; Larry Bodnar; Duncan McBain; Bob "Cadillac Eddy" Adams; Chris Burgess; Kevin Higgins; Mike McKenna; John Cleveland Hughes
- Website: kendallwallband.com

The Kendall Wall Band originally known as the Kendall Wall Blues Band, was a Canadian blues band formed in September 1983 by award-winning Canadian bassist, vocalist, Gary Kendall and alumnus and collaborator drummer Cash Wall who was the band's co-leader and lead vocalist. Both Wall and Kendall are former members of the Downchild Blues Band which is commonly known as "the premier blues band in Canada". The addition of harmonica player Bob "Cadillac Eddy" Adams and guitarist Richard Smyth, completed the band.

== Canadian blues history ==
The Kendall Wall Band entered into the Canadian blues music scene in the early 1980s in Toronto, Ontario at a time before blues societies and organizations were popular if known about, there were no Juno Awards or Maple Blues Awards for the blues music genre, blues radio stations and shows were minimal if not non-existent in many areas.

Blues societies have flourished, most notably the Toronto Blues Society, established in 1985 and honoured as blues organization of the year at the 1986 W.C. Handy Awards in Memphis. In 1997 the society founded the Maple Blues Award, Canada's only national blues awards program. Blues categories have also been presented at the Juno Awards (beginning in 1994).

== Music career ==
=== 1983–early 1993 ===
For the next nearly 11 years the Kendall Wall Band was the house band at the Black Swan Tavern in Toronto, Ontario's East End, a feat at the time very few bands could accomplish in any genre of music let alone in the blues genre. They hosted the Saturday Afternoon Blues Matinee. Over the years the band had a baker's dozen of members, with Cash Wall, Gary Kendall and Jeff Baker the trio of the organization. Long standing guitarist Richard Smyth was followed by Mike McKenna, Ted Leonard, Kevin Higgins and Chris Burgess, with each musician providing their own flair and expertise to the growth of the band, pianist Martin Alex Aucoin and saxophonist Larry Bodnar joining the band when funding permitted.

In 1984, the Black Swan Tavern changed owners, a move that provided the Kendall Wall Band the opportunity to showcase special guest musicians and include an afternoon jam session allowing upcoming musicians the opportunity to perform with a working band making the Saturday Afternoon Blues Matinee the most popular go to destination for blues fans in Toronto. The Saturday Afternoon Blues Matinee continued to provide success for the Kendall Wall Band and the list of guest musicians was just as impressive, happening at a time when it was a crucial period for blues music in Canada, including the city of Toronto, Ontario, what commenced as an opportunity to provide a setting where musicians could jam, turned into an essential part of Toronto's blues history when international blues musicians came to town to play the Black Swan having the Kendall Wall Band backing them up.

The Kendall Wall Band saw blues musicians come to perform with them from both international and Canadian destinations of blues or the band was sought to back musicians appearing with notables such as Eddie Shaw, Carey Bell, Fenton Robinson, Luther "Guitar Junior" Johnson, Snooky Pryor, Big Jay McNealy, Honkin' Joe Houston, Phil Guy, Johnny V Mills, and Cash McCall. Club owner's and promoters started seeking the Kendall Wall Band, with their reputation now established the band had proven they could open shows, headline and provide backing for travelling blues artists.

In the second year of the band, Harmonicist, Jeff Baker replaced the Bob "Cadillac Eddy" Adams with the band accepting engagements away from the Black Swan Tavern all four members took on roles as lead vocalists with Cash Wall remaining the vocal strength. Venues the band ventured to included Toronto's Bermuda Onion and The Horseshoe Tavern, which underwent many changes in the 1980s that came in the form of music upgrades that included the genres of roots, country, blues and punk. In 1988, the Kendall Wall Blues Band performed in the new small live music venue. Blues festivals being the next step saw the band perform at the established Harbourfront's Soul 'n' Blues Festival in 1988 alongside Etta James, Little Milton, New Orleans Boogie Bill Webb, Snooky Pryor and Hock Walsh and the Pine Trio to name a few. In 1988, the band acquired veteran guitarist Mike McKenna just in time to complete a three night show at the Toronto Albert's Hall.

=== The recordings ===
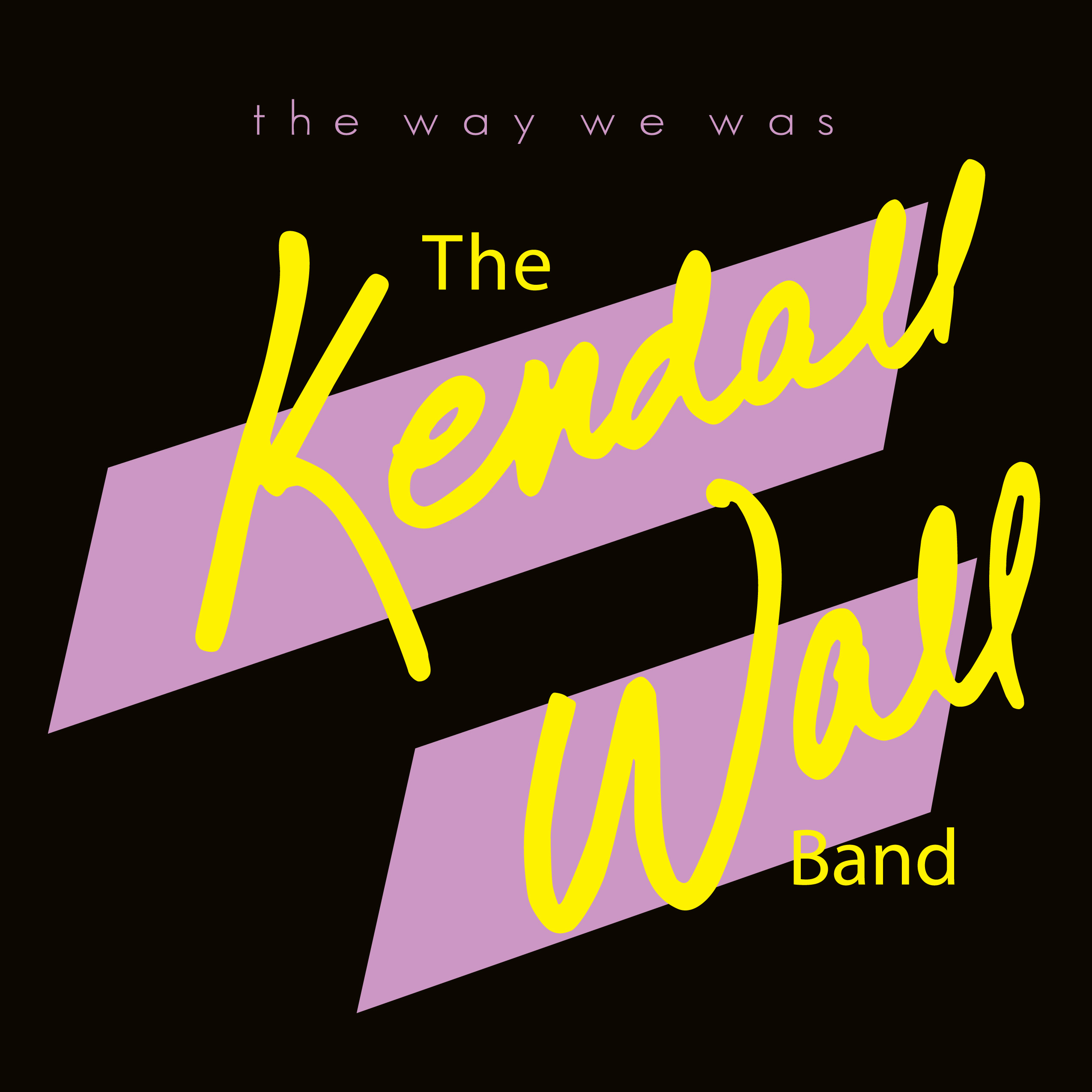

In late 1987 into early 1988, the Kendall Wall Band made two attempts at documenting their music, in a small 16 track analog recording studio in Toronto with studio sessions that stretched over a number of months, they let their songwriting take them in new directions working towards their first recording, remaining true to the traditional blues influences. The bands goals were not achieved, lack of funds, songs left unfinished with final mixes not mastered properly along with their own lack of producing experience.

The result, a substandard demo used to help book gigs for the band, the multi-track tapes went into a drawer where they were stored and forgotten about until 25 years later. With the aid of Juno award winning recording engineer L. Stu Young, in 2012 the almost lost recordings from 1987/1988 were saved, though proper editing, remixing and mastering along with the digital processes of today, The Way We Was became a reality and was released in 2013, under Kendall's label 47 Records. The logos for the album were designed by the late Cash Wall.

=== The documentary ===
In 2012, Gary Kendall began a journey to make a documentary covering the history of the Kendall Wall Band in the blues music scene in Toronto, Ontario. He enlisted writer and filmmaker Christopher Darton from Port Colborne, Ontario. Darton who works under the company name Blues Harp Productions has been a freelance writer, photographer and videographer for the past 25 years. The Way We Was: The Story of the Kendall Wall Band was Darton's feature film debut, which he started in May 2012 and completed about 14 or 15 months later. To round out this team, Darton acquired Joel Goldberg, a director and producer who made several award-winning documentaries, music videos, television shows/series and commercials.

In early 2015, Kendall and Darton began a series of campaigns with GoFundMe and the Kickstarter programs attempting to bring awareness to the Kendall Wall Band project in an attempt to raise the necessary crowdfunding required to complete the legalities of the music rights in the film. To date, efforts to raise the crowdfunding required through these methods did not produce results, with the film completed Gary Kendall decided to venture forward with the documentary which was released in December 2015.

== The band members ==
- Cash Wall returned to Springfield, Missouri leaving the music business behind. Wall succumbed to his battle with cancer in February 2009.
- Gary Kendall continued to work with a number of artists as a freelance musician and producer, returned as bassist with the Downchild band in 1995, then in 2005 formed the Gary Kendall Band. Kendall has his own independent label 47 Records, with two solo releases, Dusty and Pearl in 2004 and Feels Real Strong in 2008. Since 1999, he has been the musical director of the Maple Blues Revue.
- Jeff Baker pursued a career in Nova Scotia, in Aeronautics, while continuing to maintain a strong interest in the blues, harmonica and drums.
- Ted Leonard continued his path as a musician, with his own band the Pocket Rockets. He became one of the founding members of Fathead whom he remained with for 18 years. In 1999 he was awarded a Juno Award with the Fathead band and received a Maple Blues Award for Guitarist of the Year. In 2010 Leonard received both The Jimmy Lewis Award and the Great Lakes Society, Lifetime Achievement Award both for lifetime achievement recognizing his career as a blues musician.
- Richard Smyth continues to work as a guitar teacher in his home studio. He has one independent solo recording, Sleight of Hand.
- Mike McKenna veteran guitarist and well known band leader continued with his career.
- Martin Alex Aucoin continues as a freelance solo artist and sideman, in Toronto with one solo recording, So Far.
- Larry Bodnar, Duncan McBain, Bob "Cadillac Eddy" Adams and Kevin Higgins continued following their careers in music in Toronto.
- Chris Burgess released his first recording in 2013 with his brother Tyler after forming The Burgess Bros.
- John Cleveland Hughes in the last four months of the band's existence, died in 2010.

== Discography ==
=== Studio album ===
- 2013: The Way We Was (re-issue of the almost lost studio recordings from 1987 to 1988)

== Documentary ==
=== Film ===
- 2013: Trailer for the Documentary: The Way We Was - Chris Darton
- 2015: The Way We Was: The Story of The Kendall Wall Band - Chris Darton
