= Nightfly =

Nightfly may refer to:

- The Nightfly, the first solo album by Steely Dan co-founder Donald Fagen
- Nightfly (band), a short-lived British rock band

== See also ==
- Night Flight (disambiguation)
- Night Flyer (disambiguation)
- Night flying restrictions
