= Pat Carey (musician) =

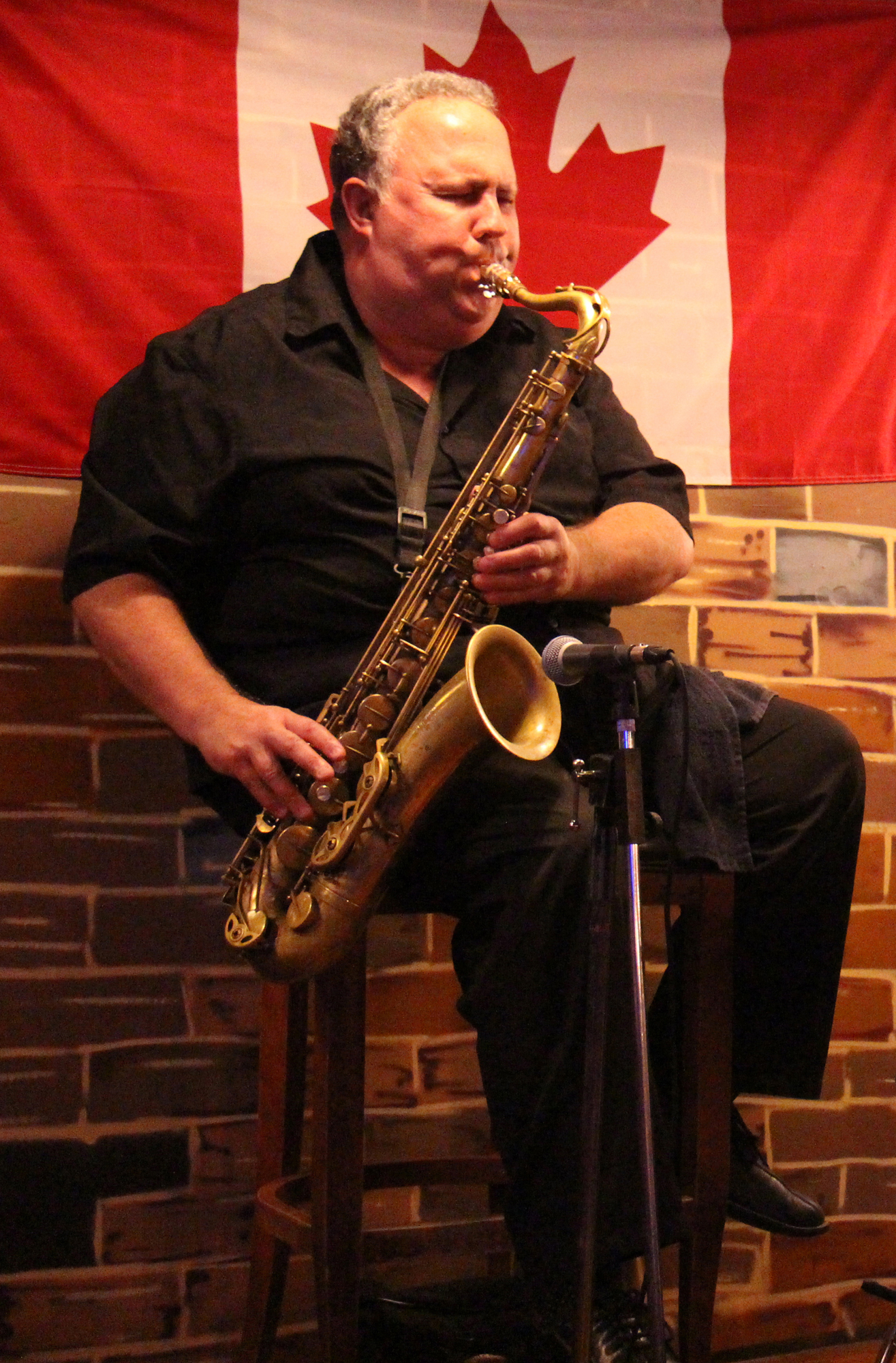

Background information
- Genres: Blues, Jazz, Canadian jazz, Canadian blues
- Occupations: Musician, music education, saxophonist, vocalist
- Instruments: Saxophone, clarinet
- Years active: 1980s–present
- Label: Iridescent Music
- Website: patcarey.ca

Patrick Leonard Carey (born 1960) is a Canadian baritone and tenor saxophonist, clarinetist, vocalist and is best known for his longstanding association with the Downchild Blues Band.

== Early life ==
Pat Carey, originally from The Pas, Manitoba, was born into a musical family. At the age of six he began his early musical learning studying the piano, which lead him to start learning the saxophone by age thirteen. He earned a degree in music, with a Major in Performance from the University of Manitobafrom 1977 to 1982. Carey during those years went on to perform with the Winnipeg Symphony Orchestra sharing the stage with many of the visiting jazz greats.

== Music career ==
=== Early career: 1982–1990s Studio musician to Downchild ===
In 1979, Carey partnered with Tom Jestadt, noted Canadian drummer and formed the Pat Carey and Tom Jestadt Jazz Quartet. Carey then joined Rocki Rolletti, the group went on to win the TransCanada Rock Contest in 1982 which secured them a recording session with producer Bob Ezrin. Working for many years as a studio musician, Carey made several recordings for CBC TV, CBC RADIO, CKY TV and CKND TV. While still a member of the Rocki Rolletti, he opened for the Reunion of The Guess Who. Carey found himself being featured on numerous jingles, radio and TV shows for CBC, CTV and Global Television. In 1984 Carey moved to Toronto, Ontario where he has continued as a working musician and music educator. In 1984 he performed with George Olliver and the Gang Buster, Tony Flaim and with Hock Walsh of Downchild. From 1984 - 1989, he was the Entertainment Director for Madame’s Restaurant in Toronto. In 1985 Carey joined the Downchild Blues Band and has continued to play and record with the band since that time, in addition to contributing to the work of other musicians. While with Downchild, Carey remained a member of the Labatt Double Blues Band from 1986 until 1989. Then with the elite of what Carey considered to be the prime pick of musical talent, he fulfilled his dream of sharing his musical skills in the forming and leading of his own band, the Jazz Navigators.

=== 1990s–Early 2000s Awards ===
Carey is a multiple Maple Blues Award winner, as horn player of the year and a multiple Juno Award winner. His distinguished musical career was so honoured by the Juno Awards as early as 1992 and with the Maple Blues Award beginning in 1999. Carey has remained a member of The Maple Blues Revue, which was formed by both Carey and Gary Kendall. This eleven member group of Canadian blues musicians whom are all multiple Maple Blues Award winners or nominees, perform at the annual Maple Blues Awards Ceremony in Toronto, Ontario as the Maple Blues Band and have released one recording, Live at Twisted Pines.

=== 2000s–Jazz Navigators to Producer ===
Over the years, Carey has been an integral part of many Canadian recordings, he co-produced three of Downchild's CD's, with Come On In being nominated in 2004 for a Juno Award. Carey and the Jazz Navigators recorded their first CD Starlight in 2002, in 2007 followed the release of their second CD South By Southeast and in 2008 they released Jumpin in Jersey. In addition to his recordings, Carey has performed with Sarah Vaughan, Tony Bennett, Mel Torme, Buddy Guy, Sam Moore, Little Anthony, The Drifters, Tommy Roe, Ron Hynes, Powder Blues Band, Dan Aykroyd, Junior Watson, Steamboat Willie, Lesley Gore, Colin James, Lionel Hampton just to name a few, as well as in Israel and Cypress for the Canadian Armed Forces and toured in Europe, North America and Scandinavia. Carey has recorded with Downchild, Gary Kendall Band, Maple Blues Revue, Kenny 'Blues Boss' Wayne, Rita Chiarelli, Raoul and The Big Time, Heidi Lange, Ray Edge, Fathead, New Millennium Orchestra, amongst others. When not performing with Downchild, Carey continues to perform with local bands, the Hogtown All Stars, Lou Pinto, Maple Blues Revue, Raoul and the Big Time, Sophia Perlman and the Vipers, Chuck Jackson's Allstars and Bradley and the Bouncers.

=== The documentary ===
In 2012, Carey was involved in a live concert documentary that was produced outlining the 40-year career of the Downchild Blues Band. Through their musical legacy Downchild, had a huge impact on Canadian and American culture, influencing a new generation of young musicians including Colin James, Jeff Healey and many more to continue the blues tradition in Canada. Downchild was the inspiration for actor Dan Aykroyd’s Blues Brothers phenomenon.

== Musical styles and legacy ==
A diverse group of Canadian musicians and business people formed the Iridescent Music Company, in 2002, which Carey became the President and Director of Music Production and Promotion Jazz and Blues.

== Awards and recognition ==
Q107 Toronto Music Awards

- 1989 Best Toronto Blues Group – Downchild

Jazz Report Award

- 1998 Blues Group of The Year – Downchild

Juno Award

- 1992 Best Roots or Traditional Album - Saturday Night Blues - Downchild (Various Artists)
- 2006 Blues Album of the Year - Let it Loose - Kenny "Blues Boss" Wayne
- 2014 Blues Album of the Year - Can You Hear The Music - Downchild

Maple Blues Award

- 1999 Horn Player of The Year
- 2000 Horn Player of the Year
- 2001 Horn Player of the Year
- 2002 Horn Player of the Year
- 2004 Horn Player of the Year
- 2005 Recording of the Year - Come on In - Downchild
- 2005 Electric Act of the Year - Downchild
- 2005 Entertainer of the Year - Downchild
- 2006 Entertainer of the Year - Downchild
- 2007 Horn Player of the Year
- 2008 Horn Player of the Year

== Discography ==
=== With Downchild Blues Band ===
Studio albums

- 1987: Its Been So Long/Ready To Go
- 1989: Gone Fishing
- 1994: Good Times Guaranteed
- 1997: Lucky 13
- 2003: Body of Work
- 2004: Come On In
- 2007: Live at the Palais Royale (co-producer)
- 2009: I Need A Hat (co-producer)
- 2012: Toronto Blues Now
- 2013: Can Your Hear The Music (co-producer)

Compilations

- 1998: A Case of The Blues: The Best of Downchild Blues Band
- 2000: A Matter of Time - The Downchild Collection
- 2003: Body of Work - The Downchild Collection Volume 2

=== With The Jazz Navigators ===
- 2002: Starlight
- 2007: South by Southeast
- 2008: Jumpin In Jersey

=== With Rita Chiarelli ===
- 1994: Just Getting Started
- 2004: No-One To Blame

=== With Chuck Jackson's Big Bad Blues Band ===
- 1999: A Cup of Joe
- 2012: True North Essentials

=== With Chuck Jackson & The Allstars ===
- 1999: Significant Sundays Series - Vol.1
- 2006: Comfy Cosy

=== With Gary Kendall ===
- 2004: Dusty and Pearl
- 2008: Feels Real Strong

=== Maple Blues Revue ===
- 2009: Live at Twisted Pines

=== Raoul and The Big Time ===
- 2009: You My People
- 2014: Hollywood Blvd

=== With Other Artists ===
- 1992: Canadian Blues Masters
- 1994: Sunburst - Joe Mavety
- 1995: 10th Anniversary Sampler - Blue Wave
- 1995: Toronto Blues Society - Toronto Blues Society
- 1995: Part.1 Moksha - New Millennium Orchestra
- 1996: 20 Years of Stoney Plain - Stoney Plain
- 1996: Bin So Long - Mark Burkholder With Little Wingz
- 1997: Penny For Your Thoughts - Kelly Gale
- 1999: Legends Of The Blues Vol. 1 - Famous Dave’s
- 1999: Down in the Groove - Jack de Keyzer
- 2000: Let’s Return To Love - The Unity Band
- 2000: Topless - Big Daddy G
- 2000: Righteous - Danny Brooks
- 2000: Amore - Ginny Lynn
- 2000: 15th Anniversary Sampler - Blue Wave
- 2000: Where's Your Head At? - Fathead
- 2000: Mr. Rock N' Soul - Curley Bridges
- 2000: Guitar Romp - Brian Gauci
- 2001: My Kind of Blues - Sunny Fournier
- 2002: An Electro-Fi Christmas Blues Collection - Santa’s Got Mojo
- 2003: Harpspace - Mark Stafford
- 2003: At Least I Had A Life - Doug Peart Blues Machine
- 2004: Tell Mama - Heather Katz
- 2004: Corporate Slave - Coldsweat
- 2004: Take Me - Maria Aurigema
- 2004: A Little Bit of Sugar - Angela Scappatura
- 2004: Coming From The Old School - Sam Myers
- 2005: Soul Connection - Ray Edge
- 2005: Try To See Me Like That - Elyssa Mahoney
- 2005: The Doug Peart Blues Machine - The Doug Peart Blues Machine
- 2006: Got To Get Over You - L’il Dave Thompson
- 2006: Musical Poetry Volume 2 - Phil Ball
- 2006: Bonestown Awful - Bradley and The Bouncers
- 2006: Steppin’ Out Of Blue Monday - Jimmy Cavallo, Pat Carey, Johnny Pennino
- 2006: Zwigg Fusion - Rob Zwicker
- 2006: Something So Right - Chris Kenny
- 2007: Once Smitten - Sophia Perlman and The Vipers
- 2007: Blue Sneakers - Steve Grisbrook
- 2008: Brand New Lonesome - Joanne Mackell
- 2009: Later -Heidi Lange
- 2010: Stealing Genius - Ron Hynes
- 2011: Bluebird Motel - Rob Young
- 2011: The Vipers
- 2012: Ballroom Stars Vol. 4 - Pat Carey and Jimmy Cavallo
- 2012: Live Jake at The Drake - Big Rude Jake and The Jump City Crusaders
- 2013: Highway 69 - The Burgess Brothers
- 2014: Musical Poetry Volume 3 - Hip Hip Hourray/Phil Ball
- 2014: Hollywood Blvd - Raoul and The Big Time
- 2015: The Soul Station Vol. 2: The Songs of Curtis Mayfield: A Tribute - Jarvis Church
- 2015: Leighton Life - Tom Leighton
- 2016: Devestatin' Rhythm - David Vest
- 2016: Blues Country - Diana Braithwaite and Chris Whiteley
