= Jesse Anderson (musician) =

American blues singer-songwriter (1940–2014)

Octiver Jesse Anderson (August 21, 1940 – July 3, 2014), also known by the nickname "Ow-Wow", was an American blues singer-songwriter and musician, perhaps best known for his 1970 song, "I Got a Problem".

Anderson was born in Paris, Arkansas, in 1940, and he grew up in Tulsa, Oklahoma. By the age of 14, he had moved with his family to Wichita, Kansas. At age 16, Anderson went to Muskogee, Oklahoma, where he joined soul singer Willie Wright. Anderson was a self-taught musician, and he learned to play guitar and saxophone.

The song "I Got a Problem", written by Anderson and Gene Barge, was issued as a single in 1970, with "Mighty Mighty" on the B-side. The single appeared on the U.S. Billboard R&B chart, peaking at No. 35 that year. It also charted on the Billboard Hot 100 peaking at No. 95.

His next singles, "Women's Liberation" b/w "Ow, Wow Man" (written by Anderson and Barge), and "Let Me Back In" b/w "Readings in Astrology" did not chart. The song, "Readings in Astrology", was written and recorded by soul singer Curtis Mayfield. Anderson wrote and co-wrote many songs, among them was "Somebody Loan Me a Dime", written along with Fenton Robinson and Melvin Collins.

During his career, Anderson toured with B. B. King, Etta James, and Otis Rush.

In his later years, Anderson suffered with diabetes and cancer. He died in Wichita on July 3, 2014, at the age of 73. Anderson is one of 19 African American musicians interviewed and written about by Patrick Joseph O'Connor in the book Wichita Blues: Music in the African American Community, published by the University Press of Mississippi in September 2024.
