= Night Flight =

Night Flight or Nightflight may refer to:

- a flight during the night, see red-eye flight

== Music ==
- Night Flight (Yvonne Elliman album), 1978
- Night Flight (Justin Hayward album), 1980
- Night Flight (Gil Fuller album), 1965
- Night Flight, Op. 19, a 1964 tone poem by Samuel Barber
- Nightflight (Gábor Szabó album), 1976
- Nightflight (Budgie album), 1981
- Nightflight (Fenton Robinson album), 1984
- Nightflight (Kate Miller-Heidke album), 2012
- "Night Flight" (song), a 1975 Led Zeppelin song

== Other ==
- Night Flight (novel), a 1931 novel by Antoine de Saint Exupéry
- Night Flight (1933 film), starring Clark Gable, based on the novel
- Night Flight (2014 film), a South Korean film
- Night Flight (TV series), a television program on the USA Network, first airing in 1981
  - Night Flight Plus, a video-on-demand service centered on the Night Flight series
- Night Flight (night club), a Moscow strip club
- Nightflight (Transformers), a member of the Micromasters
- Night Flight (radio broadcasting), a former radio broadcasting series on BFBS Germany by Alan Bangs from 1975 to 1989
- Nachtflug (radio broadcasting), a former German radio broadcasting series on 1Live by Alan Bangs in 1995
- Nightflight (radio broadcasting), a former German radio broadcasting series on DRadio Wissen by Alan Bangs from 2010 to 2013

== See also ==
- Volo di notte (Night Flight), an opera adaptation of Saint Exupéry's book by Luigi Dallapiccola
- "Nite Flights" (song), a 1978 song by The Walker Brothers
- Night rating, which permits a pilot to fly at night
