= Night Flyer =

Night Flyer or Night Flier may refer to:

- Night Flyer: The Singer Songwriter Collection, a compilation album by American guitarist Tony Rice
- The Night Flier, a 1988 horror short story by Stephen King
- The Night Flier (film), a 1997 horror film based on the story by Stephen King
- The Night Flyer (film), a 1928 American silent drama film

== See also ==
- Night Flight (disambiguation)
- Nightflyers
