= Fathead (band) =

Canadian blues band

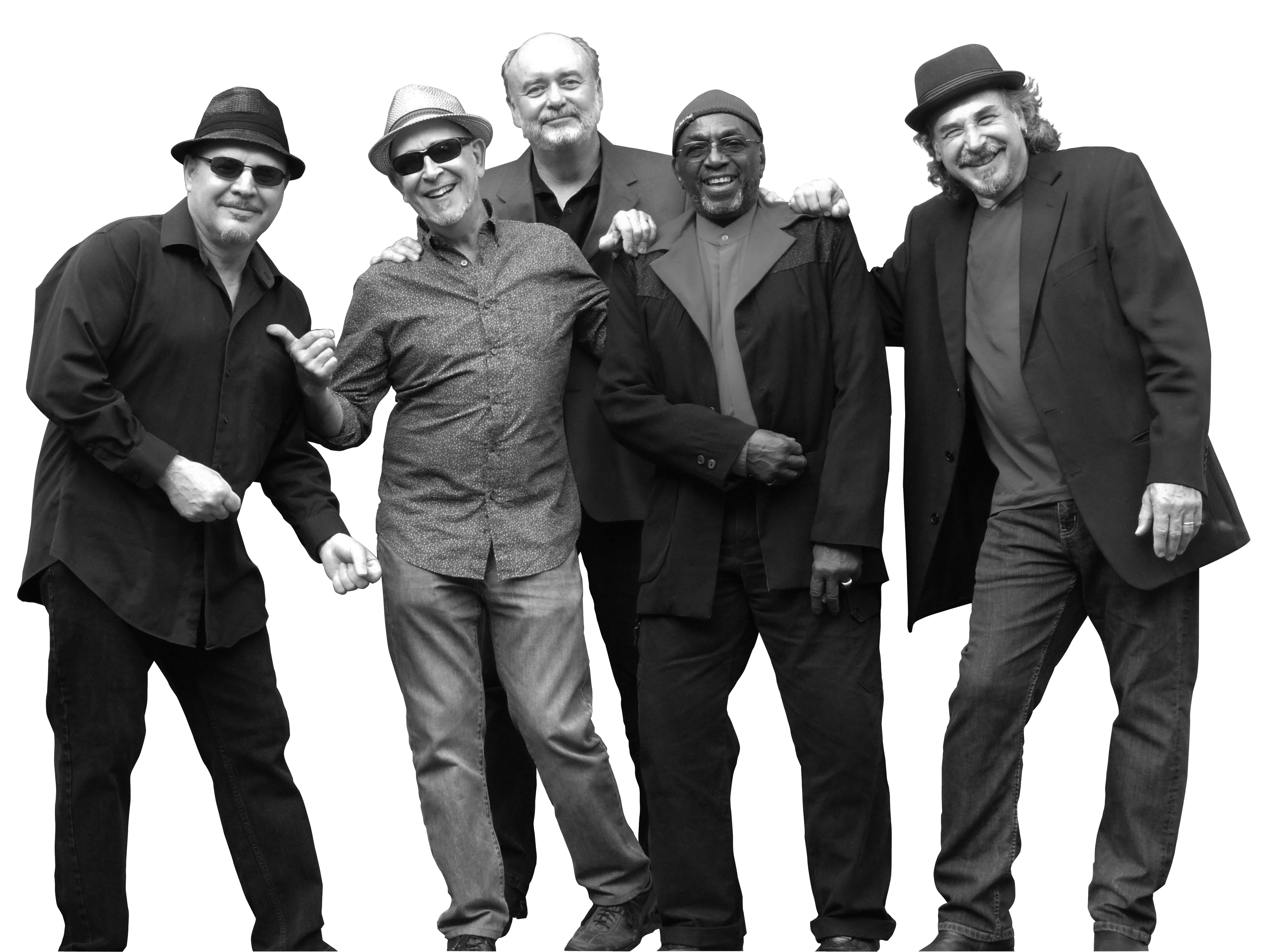
- L-R: Papa John King, Bucky Berger, Bob Tunnoch, John Mays, Al Lerman

Background information
- Genres: Blues, Canadian blues
- Years active: 1992–2016
- Label: Electro-Fi Records
- Past members: Bucky Berger; Mike Fitzpatrick; Tony Flaim; Chuck Keeping; Papa John King; Ted Leonard; Al Lerman; John Mays; Darran Poole; Bob "Omar" Tunnoch; Hayden Vialva; Ed White
- Website: fathead.biz

Fathead was a Canadian multiple Juno Award and Maple Blues award-winning blues band, founded by Al Lerman and originally formed with members Mike Fitzpatrick, Ted Leonard, John Mays and Bob Tunnoch.

== Biography ==
Fathead, originally from Havelock, Ontario, and Toronto, Ontario, were a working band from 1992 until 2016. They are multiple Juno Award and Maple Blues Award winners. Their distinguished musical career was so honoured by the Juno Awards as early as 1999 and again in 2008. They were awarded their first Maple Blues Award as early as 1997 for Electric Act of the Year. Fathead came together in the late 1980s with no intention of becoming a permanent band; they were a pick up gig. Lerman worked for close to a year with a variety of musicians. When he noticed it was the same musicians coming out to play each time, they all realized they were onto something. They became the long-standing members of the newly formed band in 1992, which Lerman named Fathead after a recording he had by David Fathead Newman.

== Musicians ==
John Mays (born 1941) in Georgia grew up with southern Gospel music. In the 1950s he began singing Doo-wop on the streets of New York City. He entered the rhythm and blues club scene in the 1960s then graduated to Soul and Funk as a member of The Insiders in the 1970s while touring with James Brown. In 1978, he came to Toronto, Ontario, to stay. At that time he was still performing all styles of music and was the co-founder of The Bleeker Street Band prior to becoming the lead vocalist for Fathead in 1992, returning to his devotion of the blues, deep soul and gospel. In 2011, on his 70th birthday, Mays released his only solo album, I Found a Love. Mays remained with the Fathead band for twenty four years until his death in 2016, in that time he was awarded six Maple Blues Awards for Male Vocalist of the Year and in 1995 the West Coast Blues Award for Best Male Vocalist.

Al Lerman (born 1954) founder and organizer of the Fathead band is a multi-instrumentalist, playing the harmonica, tenor saxophone and guitar as well as being a singer and songwriter. He was influenced by Sonny Terry and Brownie McGhee, whom he went to see in multiple performances, commencing at the age of eleven. An elementary school music class would blossom a lifelong desire to play the blues. Lerman then began seeking out many of his musical heroes, receiving advice and being fortunate to sit in and play with blues legends such as Muddy Waters, Willie Dixon, Sunnyland Slim, and many more. He became friends with Chicago harmonica player Carey Bell who mentored him on the harmonica, in live performances, Lerman regularly plays with a rack-mounted harmonica.

Bob "Omar" Tunnoch bassist for the Fathead band is a musician, songwriter, and visual artist. Along with band leader Al Lerman he has penned and co-written many of Fathead's songs. He was a member of influential bands in Toronto, Ontario, being Whiskey Howl and Wooden Teeth. During his musical career he has also performed with John Lee Hooker, Etta James, and Paul Butterfield. Tunnoch is also an award-winning Canadian artist and member of the Society of Canadian Artists.

Ted Leonard was born into a musical family in Toronto, Ontario and became one of the original members of the Fathead band, remaining until 2006. In 2006, Leonard decided to embark on a career as a freelance musician permitting him to tour throughout North America and Europe with musicians Mark "Bird" Stafford, Paul Reddick, Johnny Max, and Pork Belly Futures. He left a freelance career in 2009 and rejoined the Fathead band which he remained with until 2013, when he again decided to leave and remains to this day in a freelance career. In total Leonard spent eighteen years with the Fathead band and in that time he received a Maple Blues Award in 1999 as Guitarist of the Year and in 2010 the Lifetime Achievement Award from the Great Lakes Blues Society and the Jimmy Lewis Award, presented by the city of London, Ontario, for his long career as a blues musician.

Bucky Berger, originally performed with the band Rough Trade, which was formed by vocalist Carole Pope and Kevan Staples in 1968. Berger was the drummer with the band from 1978 to 1982, when he left to pursue a freelance career before joining the Fathead band in 2007. Over a long career, he has played and/or recorded with Chilliwack, David Wilcox, Danny Brooks, Curley Bridges, Elvin Bishop, Eddie Cleanhead Vinson, Maria Muldaur and many others. Berger spent nine years with the Fathead band, and received a Maple Blues Award in 2009 for Drummer of the Year.

Papa John King, joined Fathead in 2013 as their guitarist replacing Ted Leonard. He has performed with many notable musicians over the years Ian Hunter, B.B. King, Willie Dixon, Jimmy Page, and Mick Taylor just to name a few. In 1983, King was recruited by British blues artist Long John Baldry, whom he remained with over 20 years permitting him to travel internationally, in the United States and across Canada. In the early years, King played in influential bands in Toronto, Ontario, including Hott Roxx and Hogtown Heroes, as well as being the regular guitarist for blues musicians Rita Chiarelli and Danny Brooks. King was the house guitarist at the now closed famed Club Bluenote in Toronto, Ontario, where he backed such artists as Martha Reeves, Screamin' Jay Hawkins, and Solomon Burke.

== Band ==
Before the official formation of the Fathead band in 1992, Al Lerman contacted musicians to see who wanted to come and perform at gigs as a band. During which time Tony Flaim, whose associations included the Cameo Blues Band and the Downchild Blues Band, joined as lead vocalist, he continued until returning to the Downchild Blues Band as their lead vocalist in 1986.

In terms of blues styles, the quintet uses uptempo Chicago blues blended with the sound of Mississippi Delta blues creating its own unique and contemporary sound. Most of the songs are blues originals, generally co-written by Lerman and bass player Bob "Omar" Tunnoch. Throughout the band's 24-year career they had several members, with Al Lerman, John Mays and Bob Tunnoch the trio of the organization. Long standing guitarist Ted Leonard was followed by Darran Poole in 2006, Leonard returned to replace Poole in 2009. Leonard left again with guitarist Papa John King replacing him in 2013. The band has had a succession of drummers, being Mike Fitzpatrick, Ed White, Chuck Keeping, Hayden Vialva and Bucky Berger. Drummer Ed White as a member of Fathead, received a Maple Blues Award as Drummer of The Year, in 2000.

John Mays, Al Lerman and Ted Leonard joined and remained members of The Maple Blues Revue. This eleven member group of Canadian blues musicians whom are all multiple Maple Blues Award winners or nominees, perform at the annual Maple Blues Awards Ceremony in Toronto, Ontario as the Maple Blues Band and have released one recording, Live at Twisted Pines.

The band's first album, Fathead, was released independently in 1995. The band thereafter signed with Electro-Fi Records in 1998 a Toronto-based label specializing in blues music releases. Electro-Fi Records released all the band's albums with the exception of Livelier Than Ever! which Electro-Fi did not want to produce, Fathead released the album independently in 2002.

Throughout its career, the band has won multiple awards. Two of the band's albums, Blues Weather (1999) and Building Full of Blues (2008) received the Juno Award for Best Blues Album.

== Band members ==
- John Mays lead vocalist succumbed to his battle with cancer in December 2016.
- Al Lerman recently released the Slow Burn album and has continued gigging both as a solo musician and as the Al Lerman Band.
- Bucky Berger is performing with the James Anthony Band and various other artists.
- Papa John King is involved in classic Motown music including Music and Theatre Shows.
- Bob "Omar" Tunnoch continues painting great art and performing with the Rootbone band among other projects.
- Ted Leonard continued his path as a freelance musician performing with various bands and with his own band the Pocket Rockets.
- Tony Flaim had a fatal heart attack March 2000.
- Mike Fitzpatrick continues to this day as the drummer for the Downchild Blues Band and performing with The Hogtown AllStars and the BG Rhythm Section.
- Chuck Keeping continued his path as a drummer and instructor and is presently a member of the Big Wreck band.
- Darran Poole continues performing with the Gary Kendall Band which he has been with since its inception in 2005 along with his own recently formed band, RootBone.

== Awards and recognition ==
West Coast Blues Award

- 1995 Top Canadian Blues Recording
- 1995 Best Male Vocalist - John Mays

Jazz Report Award

- 1997 Blues Group of The Year
- 1999 Blues Group of the Year

Maple Blues Award

- 1997 Electric Act of The Year
- 1999 Guitarist of the Year - Ted Leonard
- 1999 Electric Act of the Year
- 2000 Drummer of the Year - Ed White
- 2001 Male Vocalist of the Year - John Mays
- 2002 Male Vocalist of the Year - John Mays
- 2004 Male Vocalist of the Year - John Mays
- 2008 Male Vocalist of the Year - John Mays
- 2009 Male Vocalist of the Year - John Mays
- 2009 Drummer of the Year - Bucky Berger
- 2010 Male Vocalist of the Year - John Mays

Juno Award

- 1999 Best Blues Album – Blues Weather
- 2008 Blues Album of the Year - Building Full of Blues

Canadian Indie Award

- 2003 Blues Recording of the Year - First Class Riff-Raff

The Jimmy Lewis Award

- 2010 Lifetime Achievement - recognition of his career as a blues musician - Ted Leonard

Great Lakes Blues Society Award

- 2010 Lifetime Achievement - involvement in Canadian blues music - Ted Leonard

== Discography ==
Studio albums

- 1995: Fathead
- 1998: Blues Weather
- 2000: Where's Your Head At?
- 2002: First Class Riff-Raff
- 2002: Livelier Than Ever!
- 2007: Building Full of Blues
- 2010: Where's The Blues Taking Me
- 2012: Twenty Years Deep: The Very Best of Fathead 1992–2012
- 2014: Fatter Than Ever
