= Nightflight (Fenton Robinson album) =

Studio album by Fenton Robinson
- Released: 1984
- Genre: Blues
- Label: Alligator
- Producer: Fenton Robinson, Dick Shurman

Fenton Robinson chronology
I Hear Some Blues Downstairs (1977)	Nightflight (1984)	Special Road (1989)

Nightflight is an album by the American musician Fenton Robinson, released in 1984. It was first released in the Netherlands, under the title Blues In Progress. Robinson supported the album with a North American tour.

== Production ==
The album was produced by Robinson and Dick Shurman. Robinson crooned and played jazz-influenced guitar on some of the album's songs. Junior Wells played harmonica on "Can't Hold Out Much Longer". Many of the songs describe situations set on the south side of Chicago. "Sinner's Prayer" is a cover of the Lowell Fulson song.

== Critical reception ==
Professional ratings
Review scores
Source	Rating
AllMusic	3/5 stars
Robert Christgau	B
MusicHound Blues: The Essential Album Guide	4/5 stars
The Penguin Guide to Blues Recordings	3/4 stars

The New York Times called Nightflight one of the best blues albums of 1984, writing that Robinson's "guitar style has evolved from the aggressive, sharp attack of his 1950's Duke recordings to an understated, brooding, behind-the-beat approach, as if trying to push the pulse of the music." Robert Christgau, in a roundabout way, praised Robinson's guitar playing while being less enthusiastic about his vocal style. The Pittsburgh Press said that "the horn-backed arrangements add punch to Robinson's melodic guitar lines throughout."

The Lansing State Journal determined that the album "sounds like the work of other big-bodied hollow-body-guitar players." The Daily Press considered Nightflight to be the best blues album of 1984, writing that "Fenton is still the most underrated blues guitarist in the country." The Morning Call opined that Robinson's "mellifluous voice melts easily with his controlled lead guitar work." The Los Angeles Times labeled Nightflight "a satisfying collection of sophisticated modern blues."

AllMusic deemed the album "another easy-going trip to the mellower side of contemporary blues."

== Track listing ==
No.	Title	Length
1.	"I Found Out Yesterday"
2.	"Slow Walking"
3.	"Can't Hold Out Much Longer"
4.	"Nightflight"
5.	"The Feeling Is Gone"
6.	"Laundry Man"
7.	"Crazy, Crazy Lovin'"
8.	"I Lost My True Love"
9.	"Schoolboy"
10.	"Sinner's Prayer"
