= Night Flight (night club) =

Night Flight is a nightclub, strip club, and restaurant in Moscow located on Tverskaya Street, close to the Red Square.
