= Somebody Loan Me a Dime =

Studio album by Fenton Robinson
- Released: 1974
- Genre: Blues
- Length: 42:37
- Label: Alligator
- Producer: Bruce Iglauer

Fenton Robinson chronology
Monday Morning Boogie and Blues (1972)	Somebody Loan Me a Dime (1974)	I Hear Some Blues Downstairs (1977)

Somebody Loan Me a Dime is a 1974 studio album by blues singer and guitarist Fenton Robinson, his debut under the Alligator Records imprint. Blending together some elements of jazz with Chicago blues and Texas blues, the album was largely critically well received and is regarded as important within his discography. Among the album's tracks is a re-recording of his 1967 signature song, "Somebody Loan Me a Dime". It has been reissued multiple times in the United States and Japan, including with bonus tracks.

== Critical reception ==
Professional ratings
Review scores
Source	Rating
AllMusic	5/5 stars
Christgau's Record Guide	B+
The Penguin Guide to Blues Recordings	4/4 stars
DownBeat	5/5 stars

The album overall received good reception by critics and is described by the 1993 The Big Book of Blues as "essential listening." AllMusic in its review characterized the album as "one of the most subtly satisfying electric blues albums of the '70s". New York based WGMC blue radio host Jeff Harris describes the album as "one of the era’s true masterpieces", Robinson's "pinnacle".

Village Voice Robert Christgau offers some dissent; though he graded the album a B+ overall, indicated that Robinson's voice (though well utilized) lacked power, his songs lacked hooks (aside from "Gotta Wake Up") and his music was "stylish and thoughtful" but restrained. AllMusic's Bill Dahl, by contrast, praised Robinson for the power of several composition and focused particularly on his voice, a "deep, rich baritone [that] sounds more like a magic carpet than a piece of barbed wire," indicating that Robinson "speaks in jazz-inflected tongues, full of complex surprises." Harris, too, pays particular attention to Robinson's voice, which he describes as "a thing of beauty, a deep, rich baritone that glides along and is a perfect counterpoint to his elegant guitar work." Robert Rusch in a highly positive Downbeat review points out: "There is more here than just non-descript blues. There is a tradition and taste, but most important, there is a compelling individuality of style and delivery."

== Music ==
The album includes a new recording of "Somebody Loan Me a Dime", that Robinson had originally released in 1967 for the Palos label. The song is regarded as Robinson's signature piece and his best-known number. In 1969, Boz Scaggs popularized the song with rock audiences, when he recorded it with Duane Allman on lead guitar for his second album. Although Scaggs is listed as the songwriter on the original album, later reissues credit Robinson. The title song serves as the background music during the opening scenes of the movie The Blues Brothers, a movie responsible for revitalizing Aretha Franklin's career.

Jeff Harris identifies as among Robinson's influences on the album B.B. King and T-Bone Walker, "but with a strong jazzy inflection and plenty of grit". All About Jazz, concurring with those influences, places the musician on "the smoother side" of the genre of Chicago blues with some elements of Texas blues.

== Release history ==
The album was Robinson's debut for the Alligator Records label, the first of three for the label. (For his second, I Hear Some Blues Downstairs, Robinson was nominated for a Grammy Award.) Prior to his contract with Alligator, Robinson had encountered difficulties finding a studio home for his music. The album has been subsequently reissued a number of times by Alligator in the U.S. and internationally by Japanese labels Pony Canyon and P-Vine. The 2001 P-Vine re-issue includes two bonus tracks: "I Hear Some Blues Downstairs" (4:16) and "As the Years Go Passing By" (4:49).

== Track listing ==
Except where otherwise noted, all tracks composed by Fenton Robinson

1. "Somebody Loan Me a Dime" – 2:54
2. "The Getaway" – 4:17
3. "Directly from My Heart to You" (Little Richard) – 4:17
4. "Going to Chicago" (Traditional) – 3:46
5. "You Say You're Leaving" (Big Joe Williams) – 3:15
6. "Checking on My Woman" – 3:23
7. "You Don't Know What Love Is" – 3:50
8. "I've Changed" – 4:23
9. "Country Girl" (Rudy Toombs) – 4:55
10. "Gotta Wake Up" – 4:25
11. "Texas Flood" (Larry Davis, Don Robey, Joseph Wade Scott) – 4:12

== Personnel ==
- Fenton Robinson – guitar, vocals
- Dave Baldwin – tenor saxophone
- Cornelius Boyson – bass guitar
- Elmer Brown – trumpet
- Tony Gooden – drums
- Bill Heid – keyboards
- Norval D. Hodges – trumpet
- Bill McFarland – trombone
- Mighty Joe Young – guitar
- Bruce Iglauer – record producer
