= Danny Brooks =

Canadian musician and author

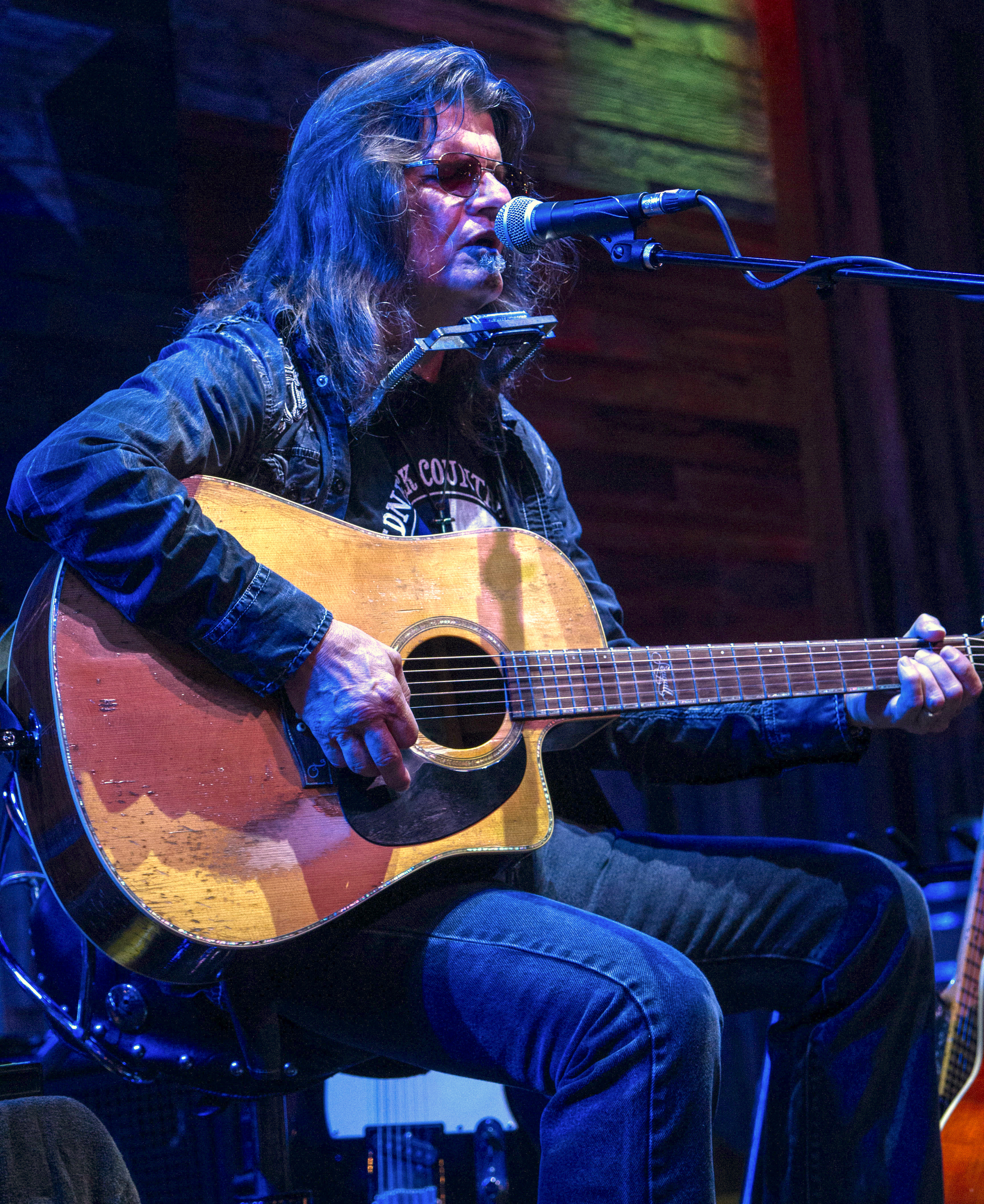
- Brooks in 2015

Background information
- Born: Daniel G. P. Middlebrook; December 16, 1951 (age 74); Mount Dennis, Ontario, Canada
- Origin: Mount Dennis, Ontario, Canada
- Genres: Blues, gospel
- Occupations: singer, songwriter, author
- Instruments: guitar, slide guitar, harmonica, vocals
- Years active: 1970s – present
- Labels: HIS House Records, (Past labels Duke Street MCA, Rockin' Camel Music)
- Website: www.dannybrooksmusic.com

Danny Brooks (born Daniel G. P. Middlebrook on December 16, 1951) is a blues and Memphis-style R&B musician, singer-songwriter and author now living in Llano, Texas, United States. He performs with a full band as Danny Brooks and The Rockin' Revelators, Danny Brooks & The Austin Brotherhood or Danny Brooks & The Memphis Brothers.

== Musical career ==
Brooks is known as a blues and gospel blues artist. His music reflects influences drawn from bluegrass, country and R&B. He has released nine albums in his more than 30 years as a performer. Brooks and his band have performed at blues festivals across North America, including at the Austin City Limits Music Festival, the Distillery Blues Festival and the Beaches International Jazz Festival in Toronto, Ottawa Bluesfest, and the Back to the Blues festival in Chilliwack (near Vancouver, British Columbia). In addition he has appeared on CBC Radio One, CBC Radio 2, CFRB radio Toronto, Open Mike with Mike Bullard, and on 100 Huntley Street. He has also made guest appearances on albums by the Mighty Jeremiahs and Taildragger.

Brooks has been in the music business since the early 1970s, having played in blues, country, hard rock and rhythm and blues bands. He had an early introduction to public ministry when his father had Danny, his brother and his sister stand at street corners in Toronto repeating scripture verses. After a rough life and a season of rebellion he was sent to prison for a short stretch in 1972. Brooks attributes his skill in writing music to the time he spent in prison. In 1987, three months after his release from the Donwood Institute in Toronto where he was treated for alcohol and drug addiction, he came to his faith. Donwood Institute He's been active in prison ministry since 1991. In 1991 Danny Brooks was nominated for the Juno Award for Most Promising Male Vocalist.

In 2000 he released his first all-Gospel CD titled: Righteous, a project which began when he first introduced gospel songs to his performance at a Toronto club in December 1999. In 2000 he also put together a successful gospel revue, the NorthernBlues Gospel Allstars, with well-known musicians Amoy Levy, Ceceal Levy, Hiram Joseph, and John Finley. That effort resulted in the 2002 album Saved!, which earned a 2003 Juno nomination. Danny Brooks and The Rockin' Revelators' most recent project was to complete the Soulsville trilogy of albums, honouring the music of Memphis, Tennessee: Souled Out 'n Sanctified (2004), Rock This House (2005), and Live at the Palais Royale (2009). The third installment of the Soulsville Trilogy was dedicated to the memory of long-time friend, and producer/artist on Soulsville "Souled Out n' Sanctified" and Soulsville "Rock This House" Richard Bell.

Recently Brooks was included in a project by Garth Hudson (The Band) entitled "Canadian Celebration of The Band" which was released November 2010, distributed in Canada by Sony. Along with Garth Hudson, the CD included Neil Young, Bruce Cockburn, The Sadies, Mary Margaret O'Hara, Peter Katz and the Curious, Suzie McNeil, Cowboy Junkies, Kevin Hearn and Thin Buckle, Blue Rodeo, The Road Hammers, Raine Maida, Chantal Kreviazuk, Hawksley Workman, Great Big Sea, The Trews, Ian Thornley and Danny Brooks and The Rockin' Revelators.

October 2012 saw the release of Brooks first effort since moving south to Llano, Texas. The album Texassippi Soul Man is a mix of soul, blues, gospel, rock and country ... further entrenching Brooks as a diverse and evolving artist in the roots music genre. The album was produced by ex-Mink DeVille guitarist Louis X. Erlanger and mixed by Canadian bass player/producer Alec Fraser ex-Jeff Healey Band.

== Discography ==
- After the Storm (Unidisc/Duke Street/MCA, 1990)
- Rough Raw & Simple (Duke Street/MCA, 1993)
- It's A Southern Thing (Southern Jule, 1998, review)
- Righteous (live at the Southside Shuffle) (HIS House Records, 2000)
- Soulsville: Souled Out 'n Sanctified (HIS House Records, 2004)
- Soulsville: Rock This House (HIS House Records, 2005, review)
- No Easy Way Out (Rockin' Camel Music, 2007, review)
- Soulsville: Live at the Palais Royale (HIS House Records, 2009, review)
- Texassippi Soul Man (HIS House Records, 2012, review)
- This World Is Not Your Friend (HIS House Records, 2015, review)

=== Books ===
- Miracles for Breakfast: How Faith Helped Me Kick My Addictions (John Wiley & Sons, 2008)

=== Collaborations ===
- guitar and vocals on the Northern Blues Gospel Allstars' Saved! (NorthernBlues Music, 2002)

=== Appearances ===
- backing vocals on The Mighty Jeremiahs' album Mighty Jeremiahs (2006, review)
- backing vocals on the Taildraggers' album Skeptictank (2006)
- Rock n Roll to Feed the Soul (Production Sampler Vol. 1) (Ear X-tacy/Paradigm Shift, 2005, review)
- performed "Forbidden Fruit" on Garth Hudson's Canadian Celebration of The Band (Curve Music, 2010, reviews)

=== Songs in other projects ===
- Saved!, "24/7/365", "Righteous Highway", and "Still Standing Tall" (NorthernBlues Music, 2002)

== Awards and recognition ==
Blues Hall of Fame

- 2009 Blues Ambassador to Ontario, Canada

CGMA Covenant Awards

- 2006 nominee, Best Jazz/Blues Album of the Year: Soulsville: Rock This House

Independent Music Awards

- 2008 nominee, Favourite Blues Artist/Group or Duo of the Year

International Songwriting Competition (ISC)

- 2003 Runner-up, Gospel/Christian: "Nobody Knows You Like The Lord"
- 2003 Semi-Finalist, Blues: "Soulsville"
- 2003 Semi-Finalist, Gospel/Christian: "Souled Out 'n Sanctified"
- 2004 Honorable Mention, Blues: "Righteous Highway"
- 2004 Honorable Mention, Gospel/Christian: "Glory Hallelujah"
- 2005 Semi-Finalist, AAA/Roots/Americana: "Hold On"

Juno Awards

- 1991 nominee, Most Promising Male Vocalist
- 2003 nominee, Contemporary Christian/Gospel Album of the Year: NorthernBlues Gospel Allstar Chorus, Saved!

Maple Blues Awards

- 2002 nominee, Male Vocalist of the Year
- 2004 nominee, Male Vocalist of the Year
- 2005 nominee, Male Vocalist of the Year
- 2007 four nominations, including: Male Vocalist of the Year, Recording of the Year: No Easy Way Out, Songwriter of the Year, and the Blues With A Feeling Award (Lifetime Achievement)
- 2008 two nominations, including: Male Vocalist of the Year, and the Blues With A Feeling Award (Lifetime Achievement)
- 2009 nominee, Blues With A Feeling Award (Lifetime Achievement)
- 2010 nominee, Blues With A Feeling Award (Lifetime Achievement)

National Association of Rhythm and Blues Dee Jays (NARB)

- 2005 #1 Song: "Other Side Of The Cloud"
- 2008 #5 Song: "Ain't That The Truth"

Shai Awards (formerly the Vibe Awards)

- 2007 Best Jazz/Blues Album Of The Year: Soulsville: Rock This House

== See also ==
- Canadian blues
