= Gary Kendall =

Canadian bassist, vocalist and band leader

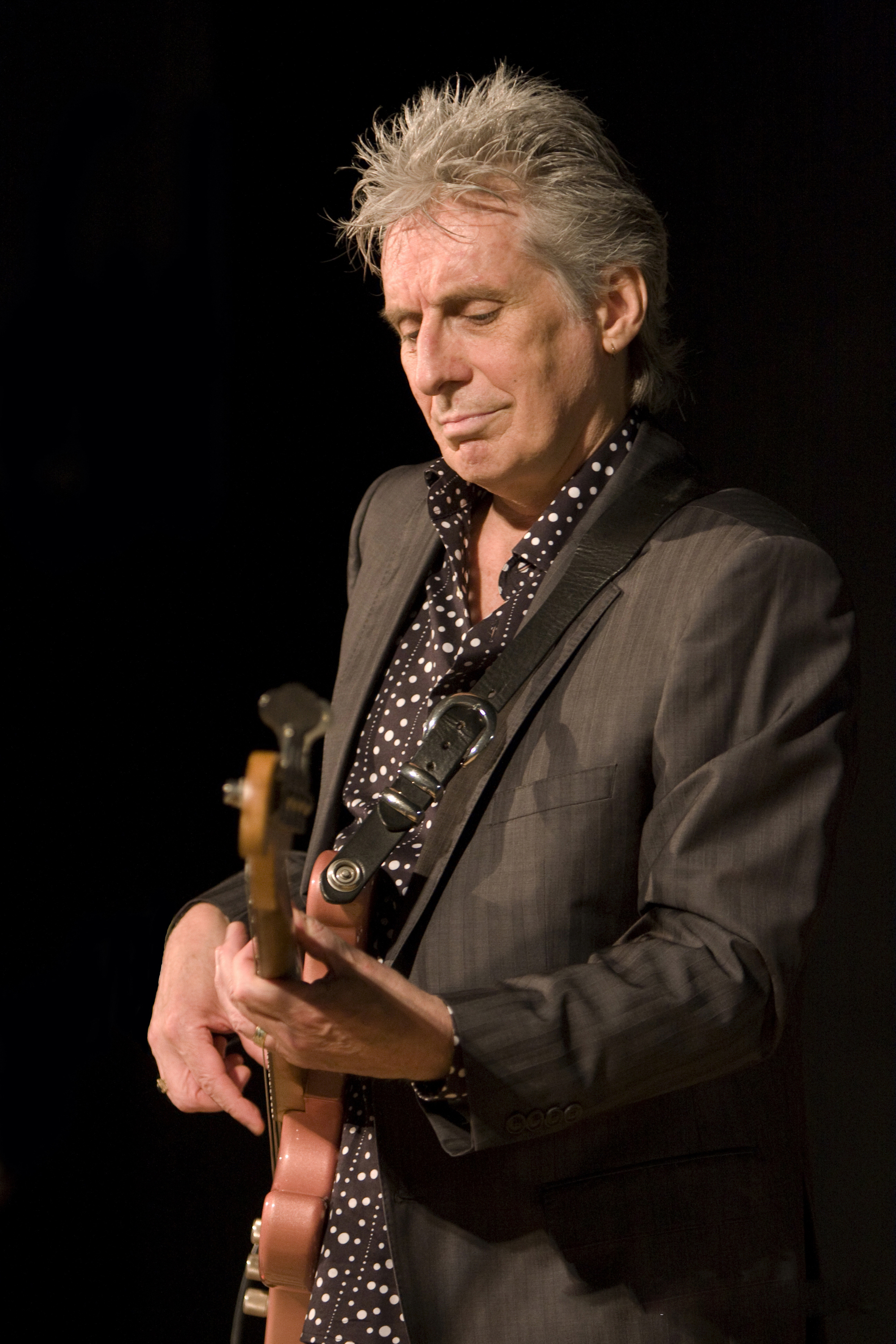

Background information
- Genres: Blues, Canadian blues, blues rock
- Occupations: Musician, musical director, band leader, bassist, songwriter, vocalist
- Instrument: Bass guitar
- Years active: 1960s–present
- Label: 47 Records
- Website: garykendall.com

Gary Kendall is a Canadian bassist, vocalist and band leader, best known for his longstanding association with the Downchild Blues Band and co-creator of the Kendall Wall Band.

== Biography ==
Gary Kendall, originally from Thunder Bay, Ontario, has been a working musician since the late 1960s. He is a multiple Maple Blues Award winner as bassist of the year and a Juno Award winner with the Downchild Blues Band. His distinguished musical career was so honoured by the Maple Blues Awards as early as 1993 and a Juno Award in 2014. Since 1999, Kendall has acted as the musical director of the Maple Blues awards program.

Kendall played with the Downchild Blues Band during the 1979–1983 period. With fellow Downchild alumnus Cash Wall, Kendall subsequently formed the Kendall Wall Band, which was well known in Toronto and area during the 1980s and early 1990s. As the house band at Toronto's Black Swan Tavern, the Kendall Wall Blues Band played with such blues musicians as A.C. Reed, Pinetop Perkins, Eddy Clearwater, Tinsley Ellis, Little Willie Littlefield, Chubby Carrier, Bernard Allison, Eddie C. Campbell, Lefty Dizz, Eddie "Cleanhead" Vinson, Eddie Shaw, Carey Bell, and Fenton Robinson.

Kendall has also performed with such artists as Snooky Pryor, Luther "Guitar Junior" Johnson, Big Jay McNeeley, Bob Margolin, Big Dave McLean, Duke Robillard, Morgan Davis, Zora Young, and Phil Guy. He has recorded with Downchild, The Gary Kendall Band, The Maple Blues Revue, Son Roberts, Ray Edge, David Vest, Chris Murphy, Little Bobby & The Jumpstarts, Peter Schmidt & Shane Scott, Brian Blain, and Maria Aurigema.

From 1994 to 2010, Kendall was the talent buyer/publicist for the Silver Dollar Room, one of Toronto's best known blues bars, which has operated continuously, in various formats, since 1958.

Kendall rejoined Downchild in 1995 and has continued to play and record with the band since that time, in addition to contributing to the work of other musicians and leading his own band, The Gary Kendall Band. Kendall performs with noted bands as the Hogtown All Stars, The Mighty Duck Blues Band, The Swingin’ Blackjacks, and Big Groove. His association as musical director of the Maple Blues Awards resulted in the formation of the Maple Blues Band, with which Kendall continues to be associated and to tour.

== Documentary ==
In 2012, Kendall was involved in a live concert documentary that was produced outlining the 40-year career of the Downchild Blues Band. Through their musical legacy Downchild, had a huge impact on Canadian and American culture, influencing a new generation of young musicians including Colin James, Jeff Healey and many more to continue the blues tradition in Canada.

Downchild was the inspiration for actor Dan Aykroyd's Blues Brothers phenomenon. This will be the second documentary Kendall has been interviewed and involved with, in 2015 Kendall released a documentary about the Kendall Wall Band, the band he co-created with the late Cash Wall. This documentary outlined the band arrived at a time when it was a crucial period for blues music in Canada, let alone in the city of Toronto. They provided upcoming musicians the opportunity to perform with a working band then, when International and Canadian blues musicians came to town to play the Black Swan they had the Kendall Wall Band backing them up.

== Awards and recognition ==
Blues with a Feeling Award

- 1993 Toronto Blues Society – Honouring distinguished career

Maple Blues Award

- 1997 Bassist of The Year
- 1999 Bassist of The Year
- 2000 Bassist of The Year
- 2002 Bassist of The Year
- 2005 Bassist of The Year
- 2007 Bassist of The Year
- 2012 Bassist of The Year
- 2013 Bassist of The Year
- 2023 Bassist of The Year

Jazz Report Award

- 1998 Blues Group of The Year – Downchild

Keeping The Blues Alive Award

- 2002 Thunder Bay Blues Society

Thunder Blues Award

- 2002 City of Thunder Bay

Juno Award

- 2014 Blues Album of the Year – Can You Hear The Music – Downchild

Hammer Blues Award

- 2015 Ensemble of the Year – The Mighty Duck Blues Band

== Discography ==
With The Maple Blues Band

- 2023: Let`s Go-Cordova Bay Records

=== With The Downchild Blues Band ===
Studio albums

- 1979: We Deliver
- 1980: Road Fever
- 1980: Double Header (double album re-issue Straight Up/We Deliver)
- 1981: Blood Run Hot (with Spencer Davis)
- 1982: But I’m on the Guest List
- 1988: We Deliver/Straight Up (double album re-issue)
- 1997: Lucky 13
- 2004: But I'm on the Guest List (re-issue)
- 2004: Blood Run Hot (re-issue)
- 2004: We Deliver (re-issue)
- 2004: Come On In
- 2007: Live at the Palais Royale
- 2009: I Need A Hat
- 2013: Can You Hear The Music
- 2017: Something I've Done
- 2020: 50th Anniversary, Live At The Toronto Jazz Festival

Compilations

- 1998: A Case of The Blues – The Best of Downchild
- 2000: A Matter of Time – The Downchild Collection
- 2003: Body of Work – The Downchild Collection Volume 2

=== Solo ===
- 2004: Dusty and Pearl
- 2021: Dusty & Pearl Revisited Volume One

=== With the Gary Kendall Band ===
- 2008: Feels Real Strong

=== With the Maple Blues Revue ===
- 2008: Live at Twisted Pines

=== With the Kendall Wall Band ===
- 2013: The Way We Was (re-issue of the almost lost studio recordings from 1987 to 1988)

=== With other artists ===
- 1999: Blowin' The Horn – Chris Murphy – (Co-producer/with Michael Fonfara)
- 2001: Tickets in the Glove Box – Little Bobby and The Jumpstarts
- 2002: Live at Healey's – Jeff Healey & Friends
- 2003: Blues Approved – Peter Schmidt and Shane Scott
- 2004: I'm A Happy Guy – Chris Murphy
- 2004: Take Me – Maria Aurigema
- 2005: 20 Years – Toronto Blues Society
- 2005: Overqualified for the Blues – Brian Blain
- 2005: Soul Connection – Ray Edge – (Producer)
- 2007: 4 On The Floor – David Owen – (Producer)
- 2011: Tell That Story – Son Roberts
- 2012: East Meets Vest – David Vest – (co-producer)
- 2014: Roadhouse Revelation – David Vest – (co-producer)
- 2014: Collective Blues Agreement – Tobin Spring
- 2014: Long Way Home – Maria Aurigema
- 2015: Our Sunday Best – Braithwaite and Whiteley
- 2015: Livin` Life – David Owen (Producer)
- 2016: Devestatin` Rhythm – David Vest (co-producer)
- 2016: The Long Road Home – Rootbone
- 2016: Blues Country – Braithwaite & Whiteley
- 2017: Duck Soup – The Mighty Duck Blues Band
- 2018: Say It Judy Brown (co-producer)
- 2020: I'm Not Fifty Anymore-Brian Blain
- 2021: Instramentalz (compilation) feat. The Maple Blues Band, Chris Murphy, The Gary Kendall Band (producer)
- 2022: "Hog Wild"-The Hogtown Allstars (bassist, songwriter, co-producer)
- 2023: "Let`s Go"-The Maple Blues Band (bassist, band leader, musical director, composer, producer)
- 2026: "Never Tire, Never Stop"-The Swingin` Blackjacks (bassist, co-producer)
