= Fenton Robinson =

American blues singer and guitarist (1935–1997)

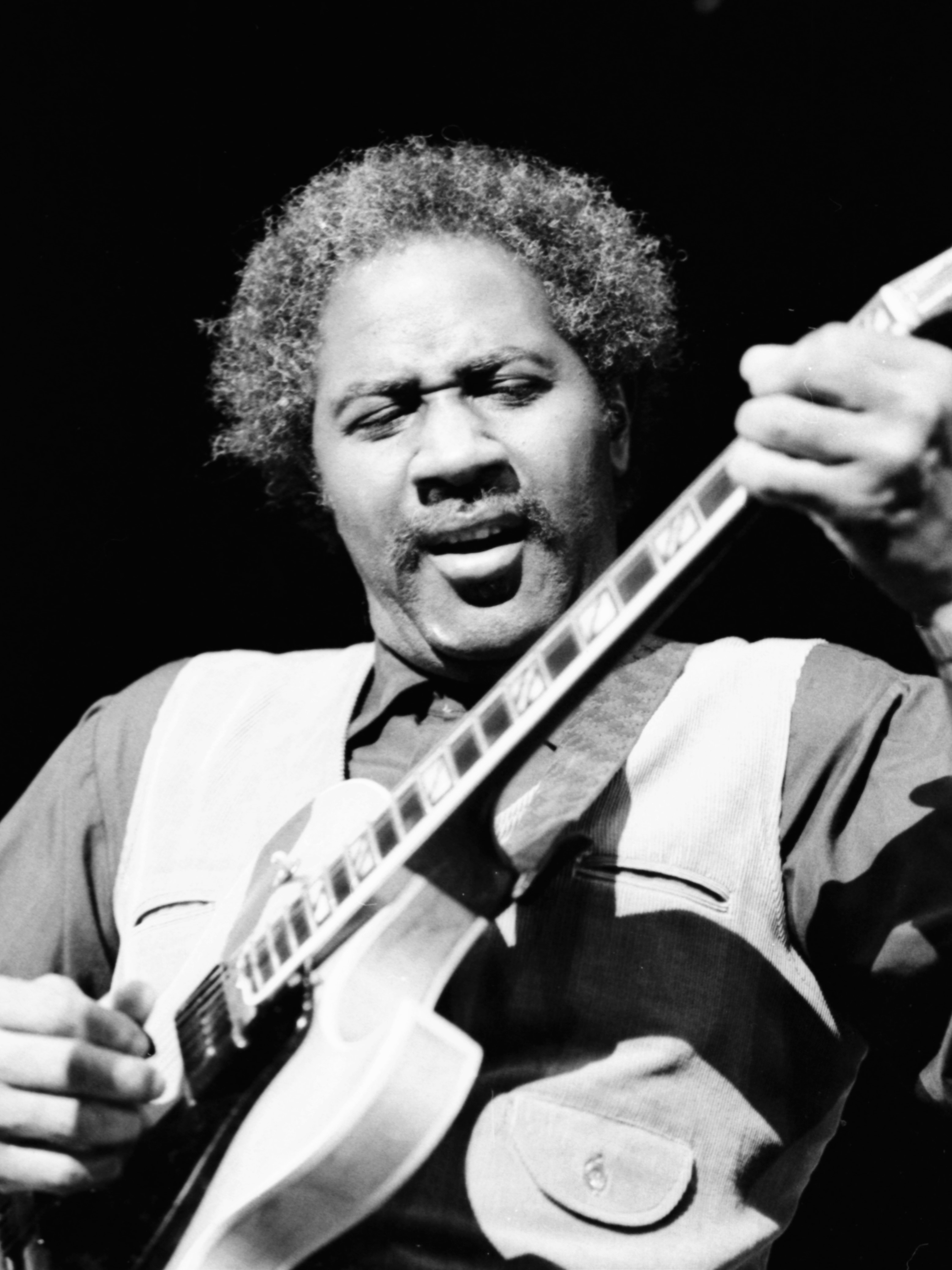
- 1979

Background information
- Born: Fenton Lee Robinson; September 23, 1935; Greenwood, Mississippi, United States
- Died: November 25, 1997 (aged 62) Rockford, Illinois, United States
- Genres: Blues
- Occupations: Singer, guitarist
- Years active: 1957–1997

Fenton Lee Robinson (September 23, 1935 – November 25, 1997) was an American blues singer and exponent of the Chicago blues guitar. In 2023, he was inducted in the Blues Hall of Fame.

== Biography ==
Robinson was born near Greenwood, Mississippi. He left home at the age of 18 and moved to Memphis, Tennessee, where he recorded his first single "Tennessee Woman" in 1957. In 1959, he made his first recording of "As the Years Go Passing By", later recorded by several other blues artists. He settled in Chicago in 1962. He recorded his signature song, "Somebody Loan Me a Dime", in 1967 for the Palos label, the nationwide distribution of which was aborted by a freak snowstorm that hit Chicago. A cover version was recorded by Boz Scaggs in 1969, but the song was misattributed, and legal battles ensued. It has since become a blues standard, being "part of the repertoire of one out of every two blues artists", according to the Encyclopedia of Blues (1997).

Robinson re-recorded the song for the critically acclaimed album Somebody Loan Me a Dime in 1974, the first of three he recorded for Alligator Records. Robinson was nominated for a Grammy Award for the second, 1977's I Hear Some Blues Downstairs, which contained a rerecording of "As the Years Go Passing By". Robinson's third album for Alligator, Nightflight, was released in 1984.

Robinson played guitar on Larry Davis' original recording of "Texas Flood". Davis later became a guitar player, but for "Texas Flood" Robinson provided the distinctive guitar parts, with Davis on vocals and bass, keyboardist James Booker on piano, David Dean on tenor saxophone, Booker Crutchfield on baritone saxophone and an unknown drummer.

In 1969 Robinson was arrested and imprisoned for involuntary manslaughter in connection with an automobile accident. Paroled after nine months, he continued playing in Chicago clubs and later taught guitar.

Robinson died of complications from brain cancer, in Rockford, Illinois. In 2014 the Killer Blues Headstone Project placed a headstone for Fenton Robinson at Booker Cemetery in Marks, Mississippi.

His signature song, "Somebody Loan Me a Dime", was used in the film The Blues Brothers; the song is playing on the radio when Jake (John Belushi) is being transported and paroled.

== Discography ==
- Monday Morning Boogie & Blues (1972), Seventy Seven Records; Sunset Blvd Records
- The Getaway (1973), Seventy Seven
- Somebody Loan Me a Dime (1974), Alligator
- I Hear Some Blues Downstairs (1977), Alligator
- Blues In Progress (AKA Nightflight) (1984), Black Magic; Alligator
- Special Road (1989), Black Magic; Evidence

== See also ==
- List of blues musicians
- List of Chicago blues musicians
- List of Texas blues musicians
- List of electric blues musicians
- Chicago Blues Festival
