= Pocket Full of Holes =

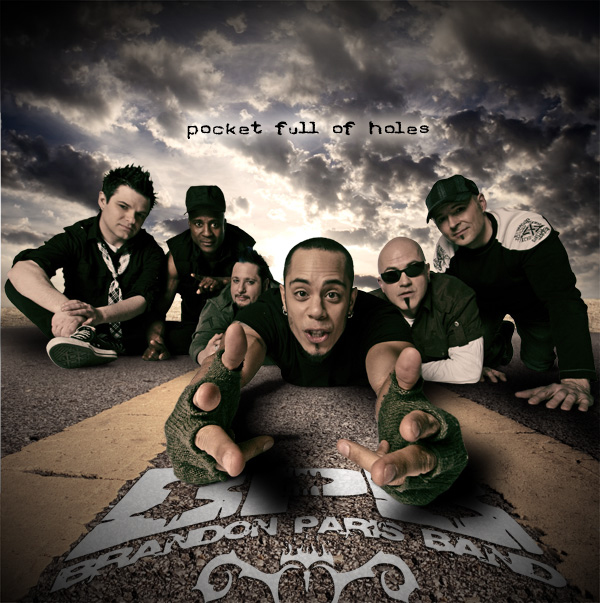

Studio album by Brandon Paris Band
- Released: December 1, 2008
- Recorded: 2008
- Genre: pop, rock, Reggae
- Length: 46:08
- Label: Independent
- Producer: Brandon Paris Band and Sheldon Zaharko

Pocket Full of Holes is an album independently released in Canada on December 1, 2008, in hopes of a big follow up to the Brandon Paris Band's breakthrough album On My Own. On November 3, 2008, Brandon Paris Band independently released their first single, "Say Goodbye" from the album to radio. "Say Goodbye", mixed by Mike Fraser (AC/DC; Hedley) and mastered by Adam Ayan.

Additional credits on Pocket Full of Holes include Jeff Dawson, and Sheldon Zaharko, at Vancouver's Factory Studios.

== Track listing ==
1. "Say Goodbye" – 3:41
2. "Drownin" – 4:04
3. "Can't Hate You" – 3:27
4. "Lust Break (interlude)" – 0:55
5. "Falling in Lust" – 3:39
6. "Twisted" – 2:52
7. "The Fool" – 4:16
8. "Pocket Full of Holes" – 4:42
9. "Superhated" – 3:29
10. "Voice Inside My Head" – 3:39
11. "Masquerade" – 3:31
12. "Never Get Enough" – 3:29
13. "Don't Fade" – 4:24

== Singles ==
Single information
"Say Goodbye"
- Released: December, 2008 (Canada)

=== Personnel ===
- Brandon Paris – Vocals
- Dagriff– Reggae Vocals
- Chris Murray Driver – Drums
- Marc Gladstone– Keys and background vocals
- Bryan Jasper– Guitar
- Brian Sanheim– Bass and background vocals
