= Beloved Arise =

Christian nonprofit

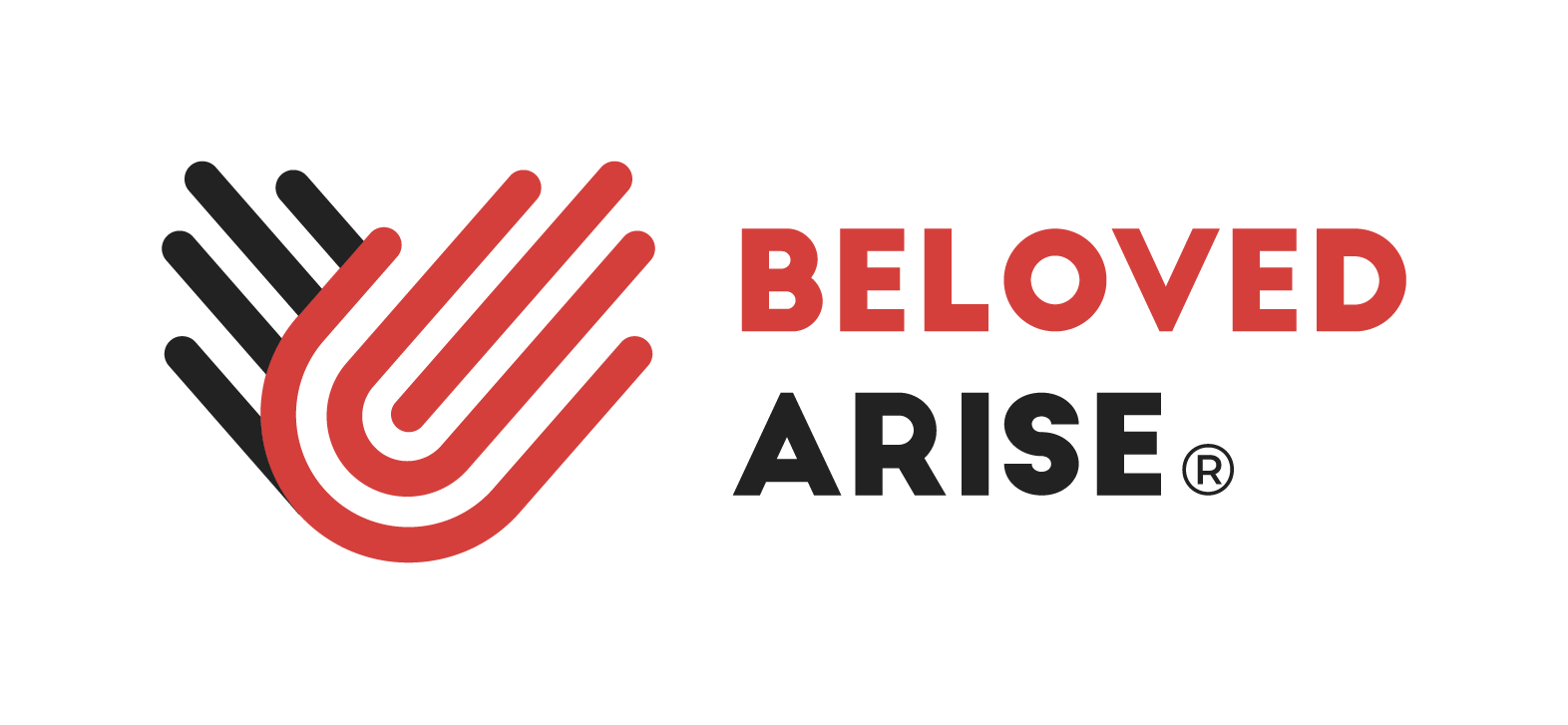
- Formation: February 14, 2020; 6 years ago
- Founder: Jun Love Young
- Headquarters: Seattle, Washington, United States
- Website: belovedarise.org

Beloved Arise is an American nonprofit based in Seattle whose mission is to celebrate and empower LGBTQ youth of faith from various religious traditions. The multi-faith organization develops resources, youth programs, and communities that empower youth to embrace both their faith and their queer identity.

== History ==
Beloved Arise was founded by Jun Love Young on February 14, 2020. Young was driven to found the organization when he faced opposition from his faith communities for coming out as gay. The non-profit was initially focused on providing resources for LGBTQ youth from Christian backgrounds. However, in 2022 Beloved Arise broadened its scope to support LGBTQ youth from all religious traditions.

On June 30, 2020, Beloved Arise proclaimed the first Queer Youth of Faith Day, which included an hour-long livestream with speakers from multiple religious traditions.

In early June 2021, the group released Serenade, an album of "love songs for LGBTQ youth of faith". The album included 10 original songs and was produced by Kyle and Gretta Miller of Tow'rs. Participating musicians included Alex Blue, Courier, Corey Kilganon, Gattison, Ella Sharp, iiwa, Mel Rottman, Tyson Motsenbocker, Tim Be Told, and Tow'rs.

In 2022 the group founded the Youth Ambassador program, which aims to share the stories of religious LGBT young people. The initial youth ambassadors came from Jewish, Mormon, Presbyterian, and Southern Baptist backgrounds. Two of Beloved Arise's youth ambassadors have been featured on GLAAD's annual 20 Under 20 list.

As of 2022, the group had a combined 45,000 followers on Instagram and TikTok.

== Activity ==
Beloved Arise hosts Queer Youth of Faith Day, an annual event that celebrates and champions LGBTQ+ youth of faith. Held on June 30, the event includes participants from a variety of faiths and religious backgrounds. The organization also holds an essay contest in connection with the event.

The organization has also established a mentorship program which allows youth to connect with older mentors that share their religious and LGBTQ identity.
