= Brandon Paris Band =

Canadian rock band

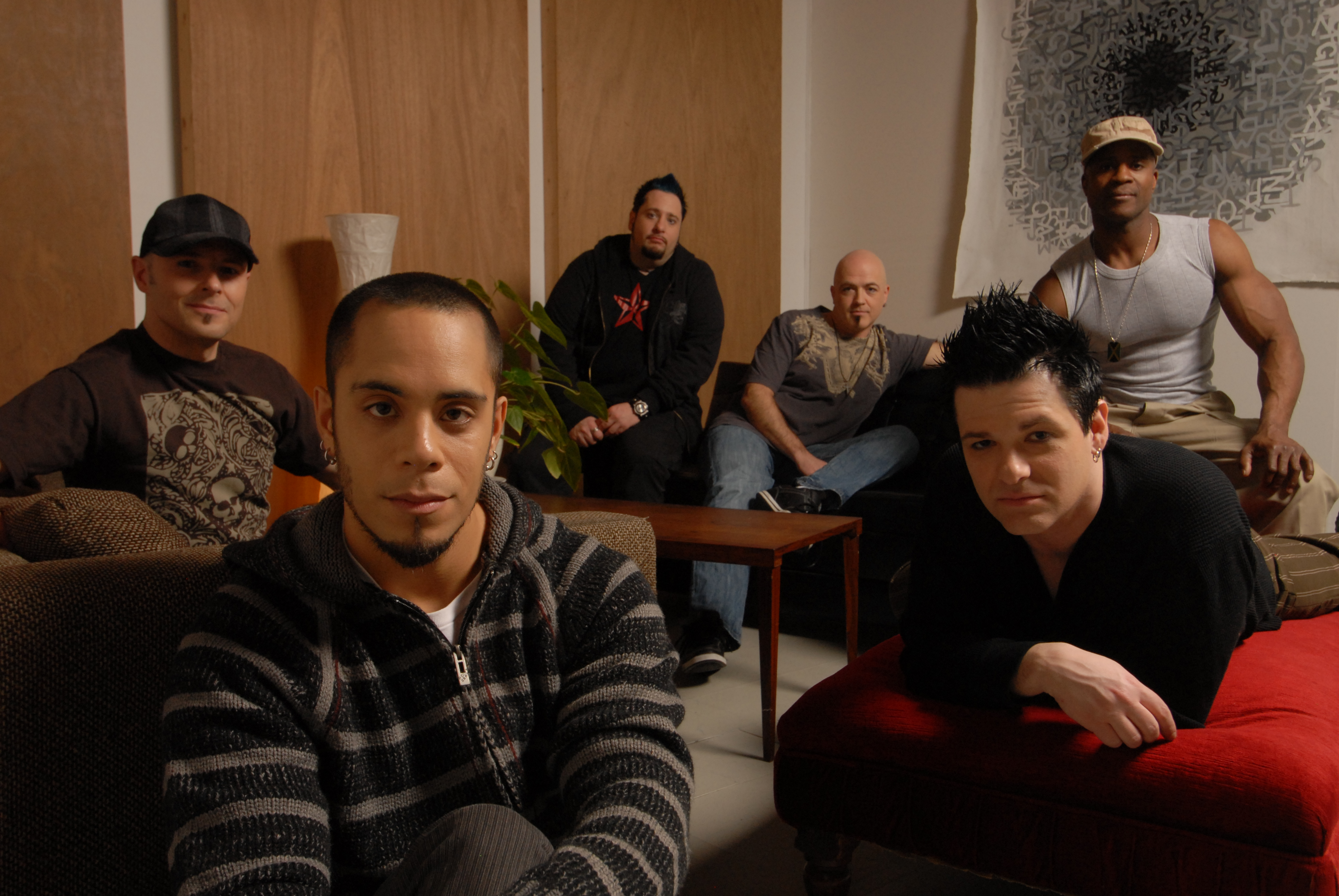

Background information
- Origin: Vancouver, British Columbia, Canada
- Genres: rock, pop, reggae
- Years active: 2002–2010
- Label: Koch Entertainment
- Members: Brandon Paris; Dagriff; Marc Gladstone; Chris Murray Driver; Bryan Jasper; Brian Sanheim; Dave Devindisch; Greg Ellis
- Website: brandonparis.com (defunct)

Brandon Paris Band was a Canadian rock band from Vancouver, British Columbia, formed by Brandon Paris in 2002. The band performed a fusion of pop, rock, reggae, punk, and soul. They gained popularity in Canada before signing with Koch Entertainment in January 2006. They released their first song Rewind and Start Again in March 2006, from their debut album titled On My Own which, after a few months, peaked at No. 17 on the Canadian CHR charts. The second single almost reached Top 40 at No. 53 CHR. Topping off an already exceptional year, Brandon Paris Band was nominated for Best New Group or Solo Artist (CHR) in 2006 by the Canadian Radio Music Awards in the spring of 2007.

== History ==
In 2002, Dave Devindisch (former bassist of the Vancouver band DDT) approached Paris at a concert to ask if Paris would be interested in recording a demo at his home studio. Brandon agreed, and soon after Dave and Brandon formed a two-man band playing at local venues.

In 2003, Paris decided to record a full album with Ninjabeatz Studios in Burnaby, British Columbia, where reggae artist Dagriff was recording his solo album. Paris asked Dagriff if he would be interested in collaborating on one song from the album he was recording. Soon after, Dagriff joined the band and became a huge influence on the band's music. Dagriff was eventually featured on more than half the album, which took over two full years to complete.

In 2004, Greg Ellis was asked if he would play guitar on a couple of songs for the album and later also joined the band. In 2005, Chris Murray Driver, who was friends with Dave Devindisch, joined the band, and only a few months later talked his friend Marc Gladstone (keyboards) into joining. Both Marc and Chris are former members of the band Doug and the Slugs.

In spring 2005, Paris tried to release the songs independently to radio with no success. A few months later he approached Vancouver-based record producer Troy Samson of Hipjoint Productions (Moka Only, Kreesha Turner, Snoop Dogg) and Jeff Dawson (State of Shock, Kelly Rowland, Daniel Powter, Marcy Playground), to rework six of the original recordings. This took the project to a new level. Paris changed the band's name to Brandon Paris Band and decided they were ready to shop their debut album now titled On My Own.

In January 2006, Brandon Paris Band signed a deal with Koch Entertainment just days after sending their album to record labels across Canada. Their debut album's first single, "Rewind and Start Again", was a huge success on commercial radio after being released on March 13, 2006. The song climbed up to the Top 20 on the Canadian CHR charts (tracked by Radio & Records (Billboard Information Group)). "Somebody to Hold" was also well received in many cities, peaking at No. 53. One month later, Koch Entertainment released "Give Me a Reason"; it peaked at No. 77 on CHR. Topping off an already exceptional year, in spring 2007, Brandon Paris Band was nominated for Best New Group or Solo Artist (CHR) by the Canadian Radio Music Awards.

In January 2007, Ellis and Devindisch were replaced by Bryan Jasper on guitar and Brian Sanheim on bass.

On November 3, 2008, Brandon Paris Band independently released their first single called "Say Goodbye" from their second album titled Pocket Full of Holes to radio. Say Goodbye, mixed by Mike Fraser (AC/DC; Hedley) and mastered by Adam Ayan (Rolling Stones; Linkin Park), received airplay across Canada, on reporting stations, digital stations and satellite. Additional credits on Pocket Full of Holes were recorded at Vancouver's Factory Studios; additional credits include Jeff Dawson (State of Shock, Kelly Rowland, Daniel Powter, Marcy Playground; State of Shock) and Sheldon Zaharko (Billy Talent). To add to the success of "Say Goodbye", a video was filmed for the song which was directed, shot and edited by Paris with a $4.00 budget. The band put the video on iTunes and received so much attention that it was mentioned on radio stations across Canada and was played on Much Music.

Pocket Full of Holes was released in Canada in December 2008 and the band toured to support it. In late 2010, Brandon Paris Band became the band Abandon Paris with new lead singer Scott Jackson.

== Discography ==
=== Albums ===
- On My Own (October 3, 2006)
- Pocket Full of Holes (December 1, 2008)

=== Singles ===
Year	Title	Chart Positions		Album
Year	Title	^{CAN CHR}	^{CAN HOTAC}	Album
2006	"Rewind and Start Again"	17	–	On My Own
2006	"Somebody to Hold"	53	–	On My Own
2006	"Give Me a Reason"	77	–	On My Own
2008	"Say Goodbye"	–	–	Pocket Full of Holes

== Members ==
- Brandon Paris – lead vocals
- Dagriff – reggae/lead vocals
- Marc Gladstone – keys and backing vocals
- Chris Murray Driver – drums
- Bryan Jasper – guitar
- Brian Sanheim – bass and backing vocals
- Dave Devindisch – bass and backing vocals
- Greg Ellis – guitar

== Band member timeline ==
The initial band members were (based on available information):

== Nominations ==
- Best New Group CHR in 2006
