= Brandon Paris =

Canadian singer and songwriter (born 1971)

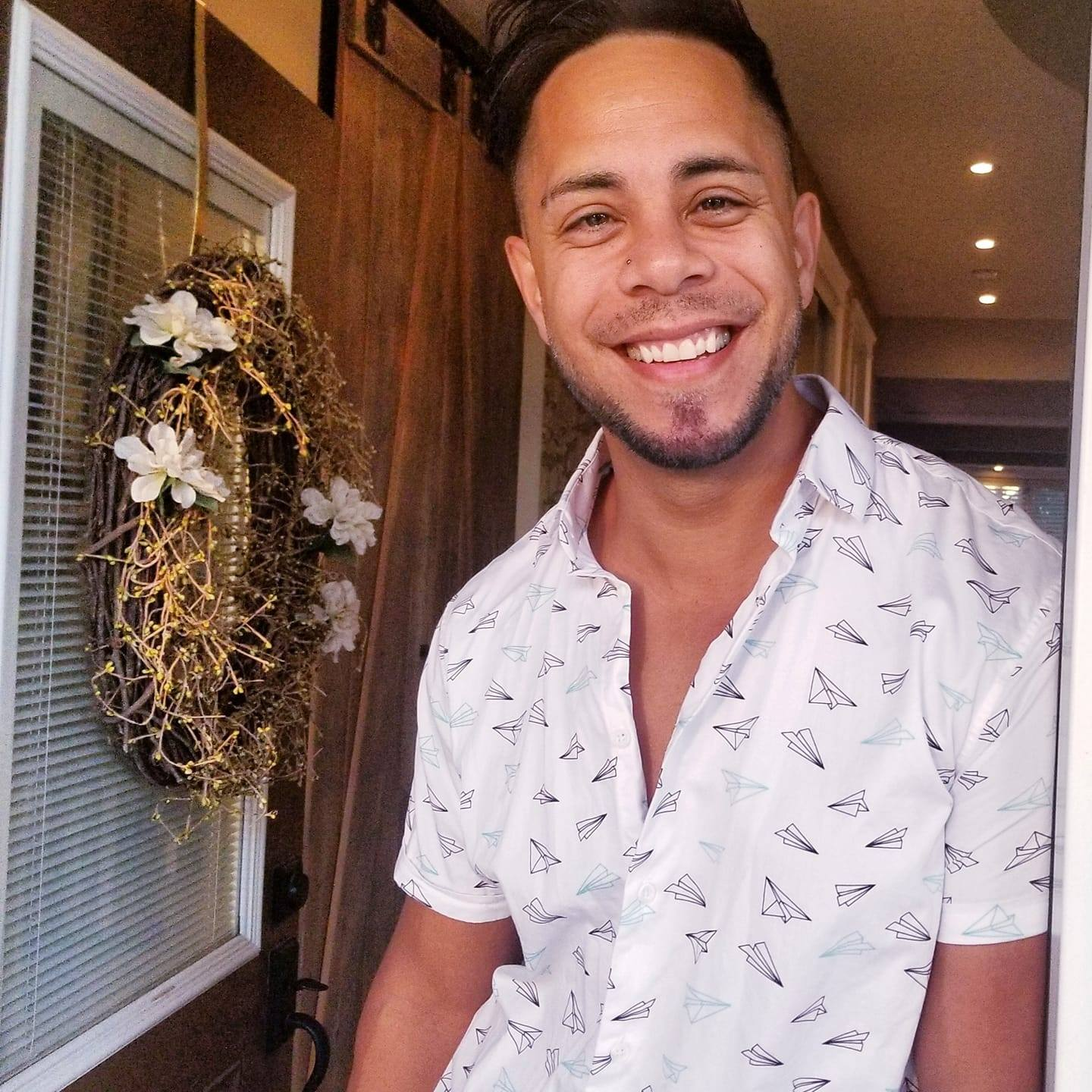

Background information
- Born: 1971 (age 54–55)
- Origin: Winnipeg, Manitoba, Canada
- Genres: Rock, Pop
- Occupations: Singer, bartender, web designer,
- Years active: 1999–present
- Labels: Koch Entertainment, Nevada Records

Brandon Paris is a Canadian singer and song-writer, and former front man for the Brandon Paris Band.

== Early life ==
Paris was born in Winnipeg, Manitoba, and grew up in a middle-class household. His family has a diverse background: his mother came from Singapore (her mother was Portuguese and father was French), while his father had roots in Trinidad and Tobago (his mother was Scottish and French and father was Chinese and Black). When his father's business faced adversity, his parents relocated to British Columbia, leaving Paris and his brother under the care of their grandmother.

During his time in high school, Paris struggled with depression, which he attributed to early-childhood abuse. After graduating from high school, he opted to study Criminology with the goal of becoming a police officer. However, he veered off this path to create his own business called Express Clothing. He kickstarted this venture by selling T-shirts out of the trunk of his car, and it quickly gained popularity. The clothing line even managed to secure a spot in the collections of some prominent Canadian apparel companies, including Below The Belt and Bootleggers, with stores spanning across Canada. Despite this success, Paris faced difficulties in keeping up with the rising demands for production, leading to the eventual closure of his business.

In 1994, Paris joined his father's multimedia enterprise situated in Surrey, British Columbia. Over the ensuing seven years, he engaged in video editing and 3D animation roles on platforms such as Lightwave 3D, Maya and multimedia editing software such as Media 100, Avid, and Adobe Premiere. His creative output encompassed the creation of 100s of projects including corporate marketing and training videos, television commercials, and music videos.

== 1999–2006: Music career and debut album ==
In 1999, Paris moved to Long Beach, California, with $7,000 cash and hopes of putting together a band. He took vocal lessons and educated himself on the music industry but was not successful. He ran out of money and illegally obtained a green card, but was caught and deported back to Canada. While working at a Vancouver nightclub, he learned how to play the guitar, wrote songs, and took vocal lessons with Patricia Dahlquist. He started writing and performing his own songs and spent two years producing a self-financed album. This album did not meet with success but, in 2002, Paris was approached by bass player Dave Devindisch, who asked if he would be interested in recording a demo. Paris and Devindisch formed a two-man band and spent a year playing at local venues. In 2003, they met the Jamaican singer-songwriter DaGriff, who joined the band; he was followed by guitarist Greg Ellis and former Doug and the Slugs members, drummer Chris Murray Driver and keyboardist Marc Gladstone.

In 2005, Paris approached Vancouver record producers Troy Samson of Hipjoint Productions (Moka Only, Kreesha Turner, Snoop Dogg), and Jeff Dawson (State of Shock, Kelly Rowland, Daniel Powter), to rework six of the original recordings.

In January 2006, the newly-named Brandon Paris Band signed a deal with Koch Entertainment just days after sending out the album, titled On My Own, to record labels across Canada. The album's first single, Rewind and Start Again, was released on March 13, 2006, and was a huge success on commercial radio, climbing to the top 20 on the Canadian CHR charts (tracked by Radio & Records (Billboard Information Group)). The album's second single, Somebody to Hold, peaked at No. 53 on CHR (tracked by Radio & Records(Billboard Information Group)). A month later, in an attempt to get better results, Koch Entertainment released a third single, Give Me a Reason, but it was not enough to push the album further. However, in 2007, the band was nominated for Best New Group or Solo Artist (CHR) by the Canadian Radio Music Awards.

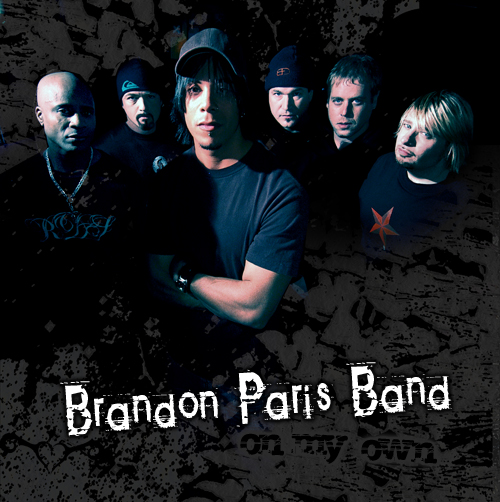
On My Own, Debut Album, 2006

== 2008: Second album ==
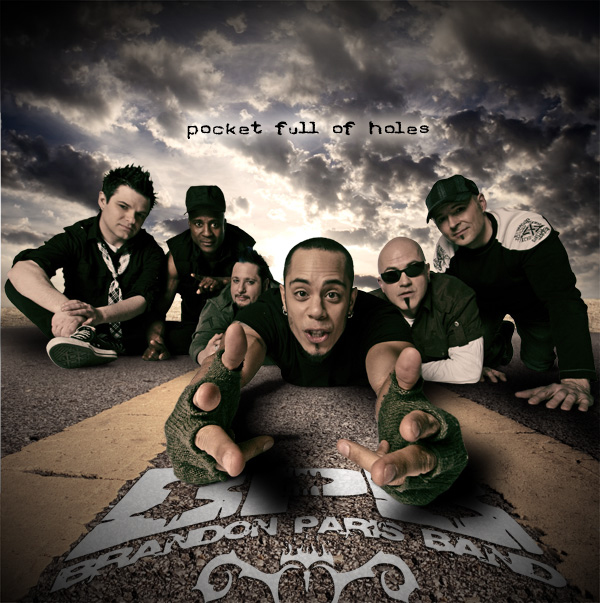
CD cover of Brandon Paris Band's second album.

In 2007, Ellis and Devindisch were replaced by Bryan Jasper on guitar and Brian Sanheim on bass, and Paris starting writing songs for the band's second album, Pocket Full of Holes. On this album, lyrics on every song are written by Brandon with two songs ("Masquerade" and "Twisted") co-written with Dagriff, one song ("Don't Fade") co-written with Marc Gladstone, and one song ("Voice Inside My Head") co-written with the entire band. All music was written by Bryan Jasper, with additions and changes by the rest of the band, except for "Don't Fade", "Voice Inside My Head", and "Never Get Enough".

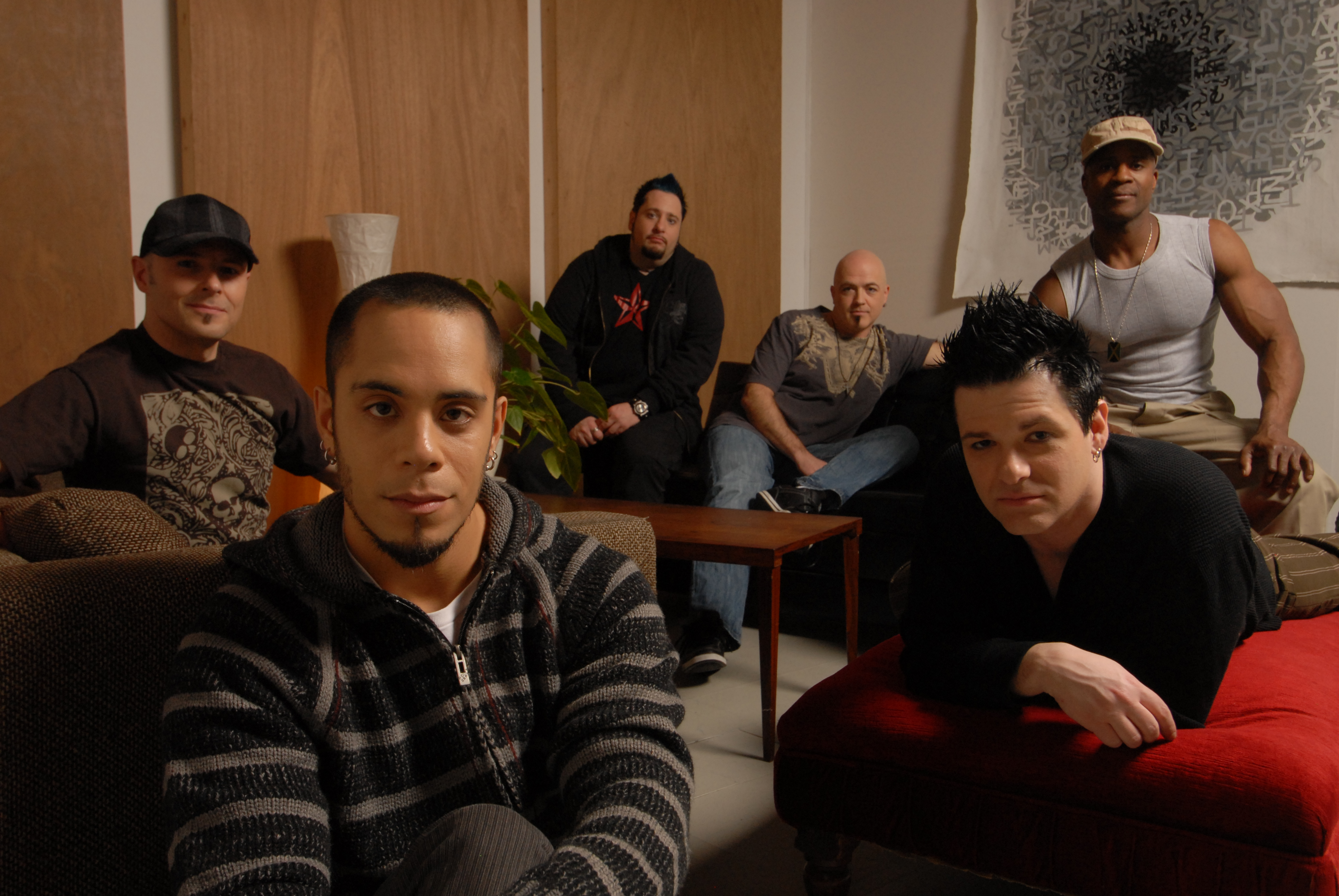
From left: Brian Sanheim (bass), Brandon Paris, Chris Murray Driver, Marc Gladstone, Bryan Jasper and Dagriff, February 8, 2008

Additional credits include Jeff Dawson, Sheldon Zaharko (Salteens, Billy Talent, Smugglers, New Pornographers, Barney Bentall, Ridley Bent), and Joao Carvalho (Hedley, Alexisonfire, Protest the Hero, David Usher, Matthew Good, Holly McNarland).

Pocket Full of Holes was independently released in Canada on December 1, 2008. The album's first single, "Say Goodbye", mixed by Mike Fraser (AC/DC; Hedley) and mastered by Adam Ayan (Rolling Stones; Linkin Park), received airplay across Canada, including reporting stations, digital stations and satellite. Its accompanying video was directed, shot and edited by Paris on a $4.00 budget.

In late 2010, Paris exited the band and the remainder of the band reformed into a new band called Abandon Paris.

== Discography ==
- 2006: On My Own
- 2008: Pocket Full of Holes
