= Money Honey =

Money Honey may refer to:

== Music ==
- "Money Honey" (Clyde McPhatter and The Drifters song), 1953
- "Money Honey" (Bay City Rollers song), 1976
- "Money, Honey", a song by Luv' from their 1979 LP Lots of Luv'
- "Money Honey", a song by Alexia from her 2001 album Mad for Music
- "Money Honey", a song by State of Shock from their 2007 album Life, Love & Lies
- "Money Honey", a song by Lady Gaga from her 2008 album The Fame

== Other uses ==
- "Money Honey", the first electromechanical slot machine created in 1964, developed by Bally Technologies
- Money Honey, a nickname for Maria Bartiromo during her work with the CNBC finance news channel
