= Letters to Lost Loves =

Studio album by Tyson Motsenbocker
- Released: March 4, 2016
- Genre: Alternative rock, Christian rock, Christian alternative rock, folk, indie rock, indie folk, folk rock
- Length: 42:48
- Label: Tooth & Nail

Letters to Lost Loves is the first studio album by the Tyson Motsenbocker. Tooth & Nail Records released the album on March 4, 2016.

== Critical reception ==
Professional ratings
Review scores
Source	Rating
CCM Magazine	5/5 stars
Jesus Freak Hideout	4/5 stars 3.5/5 stars

Awarding the album five stars for CCM Magazine, Matt Conner states, "It plays like a score to a movie you’ve never seen but would love to watch. A true gem for Tooth & Nail." Christopher Smith, rating the album three and a half stars at Jesus Freak Hideout, writes, "Letters To Lost Loves is a promising start for a talented artist." Giving the album four stars from Jesus Freak Hideout, Michael Weaver says, "Tyson still provides a solid musical product here."

== Track listing ==
No.	Title	Writer(s)	Length
1.	"In Your Name"	Michael Richard Edel, Tyson Jay Motsenbocker	5:19
2.	"Can't Come Home Again"	Edel, Motsenbocker	4:36
3.	"Evangeline"	Edel, Motsenbocker	3:45
4.	"Always"	Edel, Motsenbocker	4:45
5.	"Honest"	Edel, Motsenbocker	3:55
6.	"House in the Hills"	Edel, Motsenbocker	4:46
7.	"I Still Have to Go"		4:10
8.	"Lost"	Edel, Motsenbocker	3:01
9.	"Folded"	Edel, Motsenbocker	3:57
10.	"The Passage"	Edel, Motsenbocker	6:22
Total length:			42:48
