= Guilty by Association (album) =

Guilty By Association

Studio album by State of Shock
- Released: June 19, 2007 Canada
- Genre: Alternative rock Post-grunge; Pop/Rock
- Label: Sextant, Cordova Bay Records

State of Shock chronology
Guilty By Association (2007)	Life, Love & Lies (2007)

Guilty by Association is the debut studio album by State of Shock. This album was only released in Canada. The album includes the singles "Wish I Never Met You","If I Could", and "So Many Times". CD art design by Bobby James.

== Track listing ==
1. "Sound Track Of Our Lives"
2. "Whatchya Gonna Do"
3. "Wish I Never Met You"
4. "If I Could"
5. "Song I Scream"
6. "This is Why"
7. "Living Unaware"
8. "Sh*t Talker"
9. "Breath Again"
10. "So Many Times"
11. "So What"
12. "Rollin"

== Band members ==
- Cameron Melnyk: Vocals
- Alison Toews: Bass
- Jesse Wainwright: Guitar, Vocals
- Johnny Philippon: Drums
- Simon Clow (Kadooh): Guitar
