= On My Own (Brandon Paris Band album) =

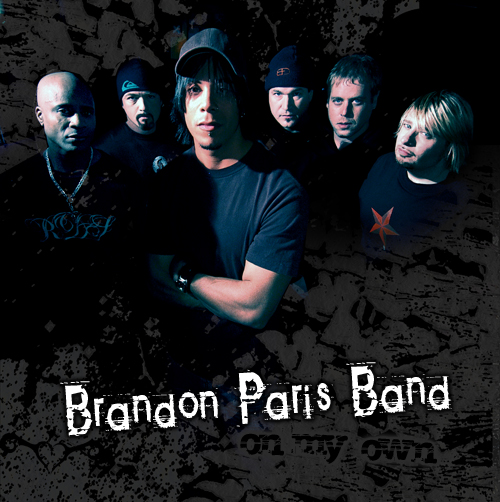

Studio album by Brandon Paris Band
- Released: (Canada) October 3, 2006
- Recorded: 2005
- Genre: Pop, rock, reggae
- Length: 37:02
- Label: Koch Entertainment/Nevada
- Producer: Brandon Paris/Troy Sampson

On My Own is Brandon Paris Band's first studio album. It includes the hit single, "Rewind and Start Again". Their debut album's first single, "Rewind and Start Again", was a huge success on commercial radio after being released on March 13, 2006. The song climbed up to top 20 on the Canadian CHR charts (tracked by Radio & Records (Billboard Information Group)). The second single, "Somebody to Hold" was also well received in many cities. It peaked at #53. Koch Entertainment, Brandon Paris Band's record label, decided to release "Give Me a Reason" only a month after the release of 'Somebody to Hold', in hopes of getting better results, but to their dismay it was not enough to reach top 40 status. "Give Me a Reason" peaked at #77 CHR. Brandon Paris Band was nominated for Best New Group or Solo Artist (CHR) by the Canadian Radio Music Awards in spring of 2007.

Vancouver-based record producer Troy Samson of Hipjoint Productions (Moka Only, Kreesha Turner, Snoop Dogg) and Jeff Dawson (State of Shock, Kelly Rowland, Daniel Powter, Marcy Playground) co-produced 6 of the songs on the album with Brandon Paris. Brandon Paris wrote all the lyrics and music for this album except the Reggae lyrics, which was written by Dagriff, a member of the band. The remaining 6 songs were recorded at Ninjabeatz Studios in Burnaby, BC, Canada. Songs produced by Brandon Paris. All the songs were mastered by Jamie Sitar of Suite Sound Labs(Armchair Cynics, Bif Naked, Treble Charger), Vancouver, BC.

== Track listing ==
1. "Give Me a Reason" – 3:19
2. "Rewind and Start Again" – 3:20
3. "Beatbox Interlude " – 0:51
4. "Somebody to Hold" – 3:02
5. "On My Own" – 4:10
6. "Suicide To My Mind " – 3:18
7. "Bin A While" – 3:35
8. "Abuse" – 3:50
9. "Dying Inside" – 4:41
10. "Somebody To Hold(AC)" – 3:48
11. "Run Away" – 3:19

== Singles ==
Single information
"Rewind and Start Again"
- Released: May, 2006 (Canada)
- Chart position:
  - #17 Canada
"Somebody to Hold"
- Released: July, 2006 (Canada)
- Chart position:
  - #53 Canada
"Give Me a Reason"
- Released: August, 2006 (Canada)
- Chart position:
  - #77 Canada

== Personnel ==
- Brandon Paris – vocals
- Dagriff – reggae vocals
- Chris Murray Driver – drums
- Marc Gladstone – keys and background vocals
- Bryan Jasper – guitar
- Brian Sanheim – bass and background vocals
