= Tow'rs =

American folk band

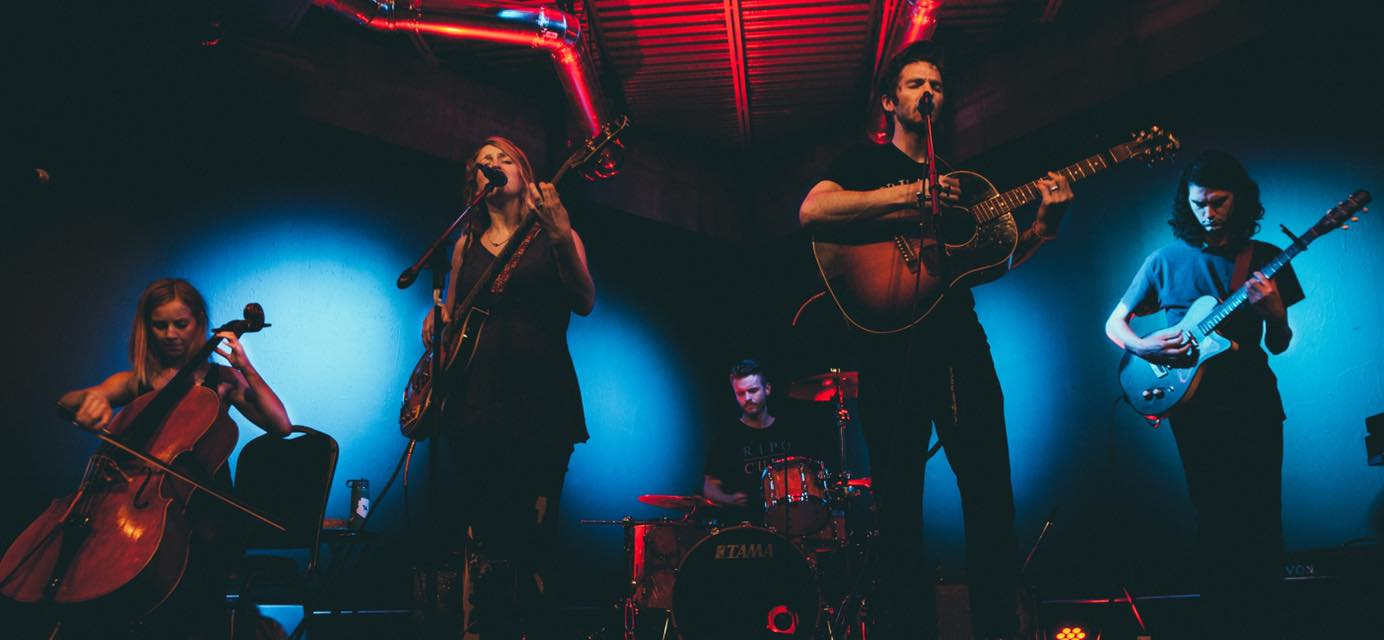
- Tow'rs performing in 2017

Background information
- Origin: Flagstaff, Arizona, United States
- Genres: American folk, indie folk, folk rock
- Years active: 2014–present
- Labels: Tow'rs, Tone Tree
- Members: Kyle Miller; Greta Miller; Dan Baggle; Kyle Keller; Emma Riebe
- Past members: Kory Miller
- Website: www.towrsmusic.com

Tow'rs is an American folk band based out of Flagstaff, Arizona. The band includes Gretta and Kyle Miller, drummer Dan Bagle, guitarist Kyle Keller, and cellist Emma Riebe. Kyle Miller's brother, Kory, also previously performed with the band as a drummer.

== History ==
Kyle and Gretta Miller met in 2008 while they were students at Northern Arizona University. They began writing music and performing at a local nondenominational Christian church. The couple married in 2012 and formed Tow'rs in 2014. Keller and Riebe were recruited through mutual friends from NAU.

In 2021 the band contributed a single, "Love Who You Love", to Serenade, an album they co-produced with other LGBTQ-affirming artists and Beloved Arise, an organization which aims to support religious LGBTQ youth. The single was inspired both by a drag show the Millers attended and a poem by Hafez about God being in drag.

== Views ==
The band's music initially used explicit references to Christianity in their lyrics, but they slowly moved away from explicit references in more recent works. Some of the band's members are agnostic or atheist. Gretta and Kyle have expressed discomfort with Christian nationalism, and have expressed support of LGBTQ rights.

== Discography ==
=== Albums ===
- Tow'rs (2014)
- The Great Minimum (2015)
- Grey Fidelity (2017)
- New Nostalgia (2019)
- The Holly and the Ivy (2020)
- Joy Alchemy (2023)

== Awards ==
- 2015 Viola Awards, Emerging Artist
- 2016 Viola Awards Nominee, Excellence in the Performing Arts for The Great Minimum
- 2021 Viola Awards, Excellence in Music for The Holly and the Ivy
- 2022 Viola Awards, Excellence in Collaboration for Serenade
