= Paul deLay =

American vocalist & harmonicist (1952–2007)

- Born: Paul Joseph deLay; January 31, 1952; Portland, Oregon, United States
- Died: March 7, 2007 (aged 55) Portland, Oregon, United States
- Genres: Blues
- Occupations: Musician, singer-songwriter
- Instruments: Harmonica, voice
- Years active: c. 1970–2007
- Formerly of: Paul deLay Blues Band

Paul Joseph deLay (January 31, 1952 – March 7, 2007) was an American blues vocalist and harmonicist.

== Life and career ==
Paul deLay was born in Portland, Oregon, United States.

His musical career started in the early 1970s with a band called "Brown Sugar", which played numerous West Coast gigs. A picture sleeve 7" EP was released in 1974. In 1976, he and guitarist Jim Mesi formed the Paul deLay Blues Band, which performed well into the 1980s. The band also recorded several albums during that time.

By the late 1980s, deLay was suffering from alcohol and cocaine addiction. In January 1990, he was arrested for drug trafficking, and served a 41-month prison sentence. He performed in prison in Walla Walla with Michael Morey of Seattle's Alleged Perpetrators on bass. While he was incarcerated, his band continued without him, performing as the "No deLay Band" and featuring longtime Portland blueswoman Linda Hornbuckle as lead vocalist in lieu of deLay. Upon his release from prison, deLay (now clean and sober) rejoined the band and recorded a series of critically acclaimed albums.

In 2002, deLay assembled the final version of his band, with David Vest sharing lead vocals and playing piano, Peter Dammann on guitar, and Jeff Minnick on drums, and Dave Kahl on bass. A live CD featuring this lineup was released in 2007, entering the Top Ten on Billboard's national blues chart.

Paul deLay continued touring and recording until his final illness. In March 2007, after returning to Portland from a gig in Klamath Falls, Oregon, deLay felt ill and sought medical treatment. It was discovered that he was suffering from end-stage leukemia; he soon lapsed into a coma from which he would not recover. He died in Portland on March 7, 2007, aged 55.

An outgrowth of the memorial concerts is an annual event, a benefit for a scholarship at Ethos, a non-profit, Portland-based music education program, in deLay's name.

== Awards and achievements ==
Over his career, deLay received a W.C. Handy Award for best instrumentalist, a recording of the year award from the Portland Music Association, and several awards from the Cascade Blues Association.

== Discography ==
- 1974: Brown Sugar Blues Band [7-inch EP]
- 1982: Teasin'
- 1984: American Voodoo
- 1985: The Paul DeLay Band
- 1988: Burnin'
- 1990: You're Fired! The Best of the Paul DeLay Band (compilation of American Voodoo and The Paul DeLay Band)
- 1991: The Other One
- 1992: Paulzilla
- 1996: Take It From The Turnaround (compilation of The Other One and Paulzilla)
- 1996: Ocean of Tears
- 1998: Nice & Strong
- 1999: DeLay Does Chicago
- 2001: Heavy Rotation
- 2007: The Last of the Best: Live Recordings by the Paul DeLay Band
- 2017: Live at Notodden '97
