= Cordova Bay Records =

Canadian independent record label

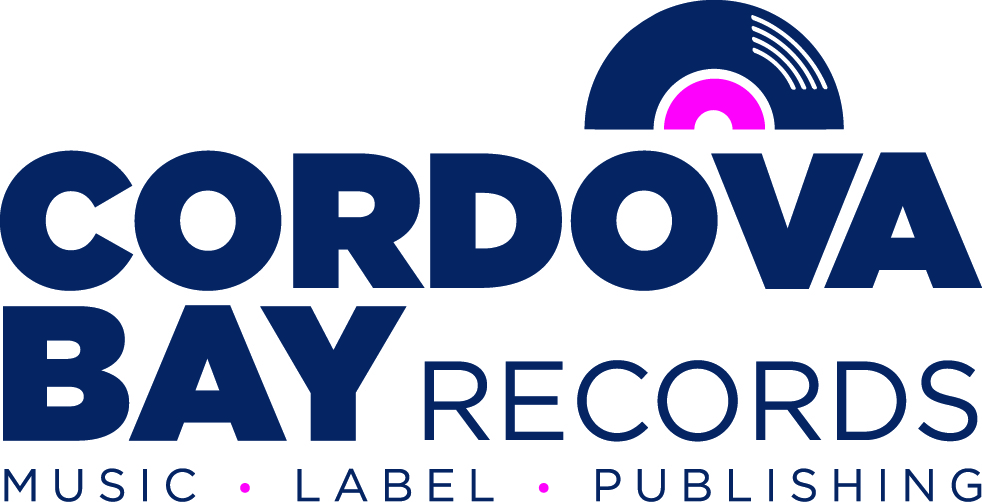
- Parent company: Cordova Bay Entertainment Group
- Founded: 1999
- Founder: Michael Burke
- Distributors: Fontana North Distribution; Believe Digital
- Genre: Various
- Country of origin: Canada
- Location: Victoria, British Columbia
- Official website: cordovabay.com

Cordova Bay Records is an independent record label in Victoria, British Columbia. The label operates in conjunction with Cordova Bay Music Publishing under the parent company Cordova Bay Entertainment Group. The company was founded by Michael Burke in 1999 and touts itself as an artist-oriented label.

== History ==
Cordova Bay Entertainment Group was founded by Michael Burke, who grew up in the Toronto suburb of Don Mills during the 1960s. It was there that he attended classes with the likes of writer and musician Paul Quarrington, renowned double bassists Roberto Occhipinti and Joel Quarrington, classical guitarist Norbert Kraft and pop singer Dan Hill. Later, Burke performed the role of manager for many of his talented friends, setting up gigs and acquiring studio time.

Burke also happened to be a technical wizard In 1981, Burke quit his night job in the music business to spend the next two decades focusing on his career in computer technology, which turned out to be very lucrative. By 1998, Burke had moved to Victoria, British Columbia was ready to return to the music business and continue the career he had put on hold seventeen years earlier. By 1999, Cordova Bay Entertainment Group was up and running.

In its early years, Cordova Bay Records associated with Ragged Pup Records to put out albums by several artists on the Ragged Pup label, including David Gogo, Bill Bourne, Wyckham Porteous, and Doug Cox. Later Cordova Bay Records acquired several Ragged Pup artists and released their albums on the Cordova Bay label.

Artists who had albums released by Cordova Bay Records between 1999 and 2005 include David Gogo, Wyckham Porteous, Bill Bourne, Tony Quarrington, Fan Tan Alley, Joe Hall, and Jeffery Sez. For artists represented by Cordova Bay Records after 2005, see the section on Artists below.

Cordova Bay Entertainment Group also created a UK branch (Cordova Bay UK) that released albums in the United Kingdom, including Sam Roberts - Chemical City, Michael Kaeshammer - Tell You How I Feel and No Strings Attached, and The Puentes Brothers - Morumba Cubana. Cordova Bay UK also invested in renowned UK label, Fierce Panda Records, who are credited with releases by bands including Coldplay, Art Brut, The Blackout, Keane, Death Cab for Cutie, The Polyphonic Spree, Placebo, and Shitdisco, among many others.

In 2006, Cordova Bay Entertainment Group and Fierce Panda Records launched a Canadian branch of Fierce Panda, known as Fierce Panda Canada. Fierce Panda Canada released albums by UK artists iLiKETRAiNS, My Architects, Capdown, Make Good Your Escape, and Shitdisco. In 2016 Canadian band The Velveteins joined the Fierce Panda Canada roster, followed by Chersea in 2017, and The Tourist Company in 2019.

== Gold and platinum certifications ==
State of Shock Too Pretty (Single) April 2010

Country	Certification	Sales/shipments
Canada	Gold	20,000

State of Shock Best I Ever Had (Single) November 2008

Country	Certification	Sales/shipments
Canada	Platinum	40,000

State of Shock Money Honey (Single) May 2009

Country	Certification	Sales/shipments
Canada	2× Platinum	80,000

State of Shock Life, Love & Lies (Album) April 2011

Country	Certification	Sales/shipments
Canada	Gold	50,000

Raghav Fire (Single) September 2011

Country	Certification	Sales/shipments
Canada	Gold	40,000

Karl Wolf Amateur at Love (Single) April 2017

Country	Certification	Sales/shipments
Canada	Gold	40,000

== Awards and honors ==
=== Juno Awards ===
The Juno Awards are presented by the Canadian Academy of Recording Arts and Sciences. Cordova Bay Records artists have been nominated for a total of 5 Juno Awards since 2003. Bill Bourne's album Sally's Dream was also nominated for an award in 1999 - it was released by Ragged Pup Records (later acquired by Cordova Bay Records).

Year	Nominee / work	Award	Result
1999	Bill Bourne Sally's Dream	Best Roots & Traditional Album: Solo	Nominated
2003	David Gogo Live at Deer Lake	Blues Album of the Year	Nominated
2007	David Gogo Acoustic	Blues Album of the Year	Nominated
2008	State of Shock	New Group of the Year	Nominated
2008	Bob Lanois Snake Road	Instrumental Album of the Year	Nominated
2011	Raghav So Much feat. Kardinal Offishall	R&B/Soul Recording of the Year	Nominated
2012	David Gogo Soul Bender	Blues Album of the Year	Nominated
2014	David Gogo Come On Down	Blues Album of the Year	Nominated
2016	David Gogo Vicksburg Call	Blues Album of the Year	Nominated

=== Western Canadian Music Awards ===
The Western Canadian Music Awards is an annual awards ceremony for music in the western portion of Canada, that originated in its current form in 2003. The awards are provided by the Western Canada Music Alliance, which consists of five Member groups from Alberta, Saskatchewan, Manitoba, British Columbia and Yukon.

Year	Nominee / work	Award	Result
2007	David Gogo Acoustic	Outstanding Blues Recording	Nominated
2007	Bill Bourne Boon Tang	Outstanding Roots Recording - Solo	Nominated
2008	State of Shock Life, Love & Lies	Outstanding Rock Recording	Won
2008	Wyckham Porteous 3 AM	Outstanding Roots Recording - Solo	Nominated
2012	David Gogo Soul Bender	Blues Recording of the Year	Won
2014	David Gogo Come On Down	Blues Recording of the Year	Nominated
2015	WiL El Paseo	Roots Solo Recording of the Year	Nominated
2016	David Gogo Vicksburg Call	Blues Artist of the Year	Nominated
2018	Bend Sinister The Other Way	Recording of the Year	Nominated
2018	Bend Sinister	Rock Artist of the Year	Nominated

=== Canadian Indie Awards ===
The INDIE Music Awards happen every March in Toronto as part of Canadian Music Week.

Year	Nominee / work	Award	Result
2008	State of Shock Money Honey	Single of the Year	Won
2008	David Gogo Acoustic	Blues Album of the Year	Nominated
2012	David Gogo	Blues Artist of the Year	Nominated
2012	Raghav Fire	Single of the Year	Nominated

=== Canadian Radio Music Awards ===
The Canadian Radio Music Awards are an annual series of awards presented by the Canadian Association of Broadcasters that are part of Canadian Music Week.

Year	Nominee / work	Award	Result
2008	State of Shock Money Honey	Best New Group (ROCK)	Won
2008	State of Shock Money Honey	Best New Group (CHR)	Won
2011	Raghav So Much	Dance/Urban/Rhythmic	Nominated
2012	Raghav Fire	CHR	Nominated
2012	Raghav Fire	HOT AC	Nominated

=== Canadian Music and Broadcast Industry Awards ===
The Canadian Music and Broadcast Industry Awards happen every March in Toronto as part of Canadian Music Week.

Year	Nominee / work	Award	Result
2009	Cordova Bay Records	Canadian Independent Label of the Year	Nominated

=== Maple Blues Awards ===
The Maple Blues Awards are Canada's blues awards, "honouring the finest in Canadian blues". They are the only comprehensive national best in blues awards program. The program's goal is to promote blues music across Canada, and to recognize outstanding achievement. The Maple Blues Awards have been presented by the Toronto Blues Society since their inception in 1997.

Year	Nominee / work	Award	Result
2002	David Gogo	Guitarist of the Year	Won
2003	David Gogo	Entertainer of the Year	Nominated
2003	David Gogo	Electric Act of the Year	Nominated
2003	David Gogo	Guitarist of the Year	Nominated
2003	David Gogo	Songwriter of the Year	Nominated
2003	David Gogo Skeleton Key	Recording of the Year	Nominated
2004	David Gogo	Entertainer of the Year	Nominated
2004	David Gogo	Guitarist of the Year	Won
2005	David Gogo	Electric Act of the Year	Nominated
2009	David Gogo	Electric Act of the Year	Nominated
2010	David Gogo	Electric Act of the Year	Nominated
2011	David Gogo	Guitar Player of the Year	Nominated
2011	David Gogo	Electric Act of the Year	Nominated
2012	David Gogo	Guitar Player of the Year	Nominated
2013	David Gogo	Guitar Player of the Year	Nominated
2013	David Gogo	Electric Act of the Year	Nominated
2014	David Vest	Piano/Keyboard Player of the Year	Won
2015	David Gogo	Guitarist of the Year	Nominated
2015	David Gogo	Entertainer of the Year	Nominated
2015	David Vest	Piano/Keyboard Player of the Year	Won
2016	David Gogo	Electric Act of the Year	Nominated
2016	David Gogo	Guitarist of the Year	Nominated
2016	David Gogo Vicksburg Call	Recording/Producer of the Year	Nominated
2017	David Gogo	Guitarist of the Year	Won

=== Canadian Folk Music Awards ===
The Canadian Folk Music Awards are an annual music awards ceremony, presenting awards in a variety of categories for achievements in both traditional and contemporary folk music, and other roots music genres, by Canadian musicians. The awards program was created in 2005 by a group of independent label representatives, folk music presenters, artists and enthusiasts, to celebrate and promote Canadian folk music.

Year	Nominee / work	Award	Result
2008	Wyckham Porteous 3 AM	Contemporary Singer of the Year	Nominated
2008	Wyckham Porteous 3 AM	English Songwriter of the Year	Nominated
2008	Wyckham Porteous 3 AM	Solo Artist of the Year	Nominated

=== West Coast Music Awards ===
The West Coast Music Awards were an annual music awards ceremony, presenting awards to musicians from British Columbia and the Yukon. In 2003, the West Coast Music Awards combined with Alberta, Saskatchewan, and Manitoba to form the Western Canadian Music Awards.

Year	Nominee / work	Award	Result
2000	David Gogo	Musician of the Year	Won
2002	Wyckham Porteous sexanddrinking	Best Indie Release	Nominated
2002	Wyckham Porteous sexanddrinking	Best Folk Release	Nominated
2002	Wyckham Porteous	Musician of the Year	Nominated

== Artists ==
Current Roster:

- Karl Wolf
- Bend Sinister
- Rykka
- Tilsen
- David Gogo
- Sam Weber
- WiL

Historical Roster:

- Acres Of Lions
- Austin Belle
- Bill Bourne
- City Walls
- Mike Edel
- David Gogo
- Krome
- Bob Lanois
- Steph Macpherson
- Me and Mae
- Porkbelly Futures
- Wyckham Porteous
- Paul Quarrington
- Raghav (Canada Only)
- State Of Shock
- Isobel Trigger
- Vince Vaccaro
- David Vest
- Sam Weber

== Affiliates ==
Cordova Bay Entertainment Group, Inc. consists of two main parts - Cordova Bay Records and Cordova Bay Music Publishing, and also includes Quarrington Worthy Music Publishing and Cordova Bay Music Publishing II.

The company also has equity involvement and partnerships with the following affiliates:

'MapleCore Ltd.

- Maple Music Recordings
- Fontana North Distribution
- Open Road Recordings
- MapleMusic.com
- TicketBreak

Fierce Panda Records

Fierce Panda Canada

Flying Colours Label Services

The Mobile Cartel

Infinity Mastering Facility
