= David Vest =

- Born: November 2, 1943 (age 82); Huntsville, Alabama, United States
- Origin: Birmingham, Alabama
- Genres: Blues
- Occupation(s): Musician, singer-songwriter
- Instrument: Piano
- Years active: 1957–present
- Labels: Cordova Bay Records
- Website: www.davidvest.ca

David Vest (born November 2, 1943) is an American blues piano player and songwriter from Huntsville, Alabama, United States. Vest is currently signed to the Canadian Independent label, Cordova Bay Records, and lives in Victoria, British Columbia, Canada.

== History ==
Vest was born in 1943, and grew up in Birmingham, Alabama, United States. He learned to a play on a used piano his grandmother had delivered to their house in West End, a few blocks away from Ensley's Tuxedo Junction.

He played his first paying gig at the age of 14. He has worked professionally as a pianist from the age of 15, since 1957. In the 1960s Vest played seven nights a week at Pappy's Club with Jerry Woodard and The Esquires. On New Year's Day 1962 he opened for Roy Orbison. He backed Big Joe Turner in the 1960s and later toured with Jimmy T99 Nelson, Floyd Dixon, and Lavelle White, as well as the rockabilly group Bill Black's Combo. David Vest was also the co-leader of the Paul deLay Band.

He currently lives in Victoria, British Columbia, Canada, with his wife.

== Awards and achievements ==
David Vest was voted 2012 Maple Blues Keyboard/Piano Player of the Year by The Toronto Blues Society. His 2012 album East Meets Vest, was also nominated for Maple Blues Recording Of The Year.

Vest has received five Muddy Awards from the Cascade Blues Association, including the Best Keyboard Player. He has also played piano on Bill Johnson's JUNO-nominated album Still Blue and on David Gogo's 2014 JUNO-nominated record Come On Down.

His 2014 album Roadhouse Revelation charted on the !earshot (NCRA) national Top 50 at number 24 on the week of June 10, 2014. The release also charted at number one on the Roots Music Report Chart.

== Solo discography ==
- 2003 Way Down Here (Ark-O-Matic)
- 2005 Serve Me Right to Shuffle (Ark-O-Matic)
- 2010 Rock A While (Ark-O-Matic)
- 2012 East Meets Vest (Ark-O-Matic)
- 2014 Roadhouse Revelation (Cordova Bay Records)
