= David Gogo =

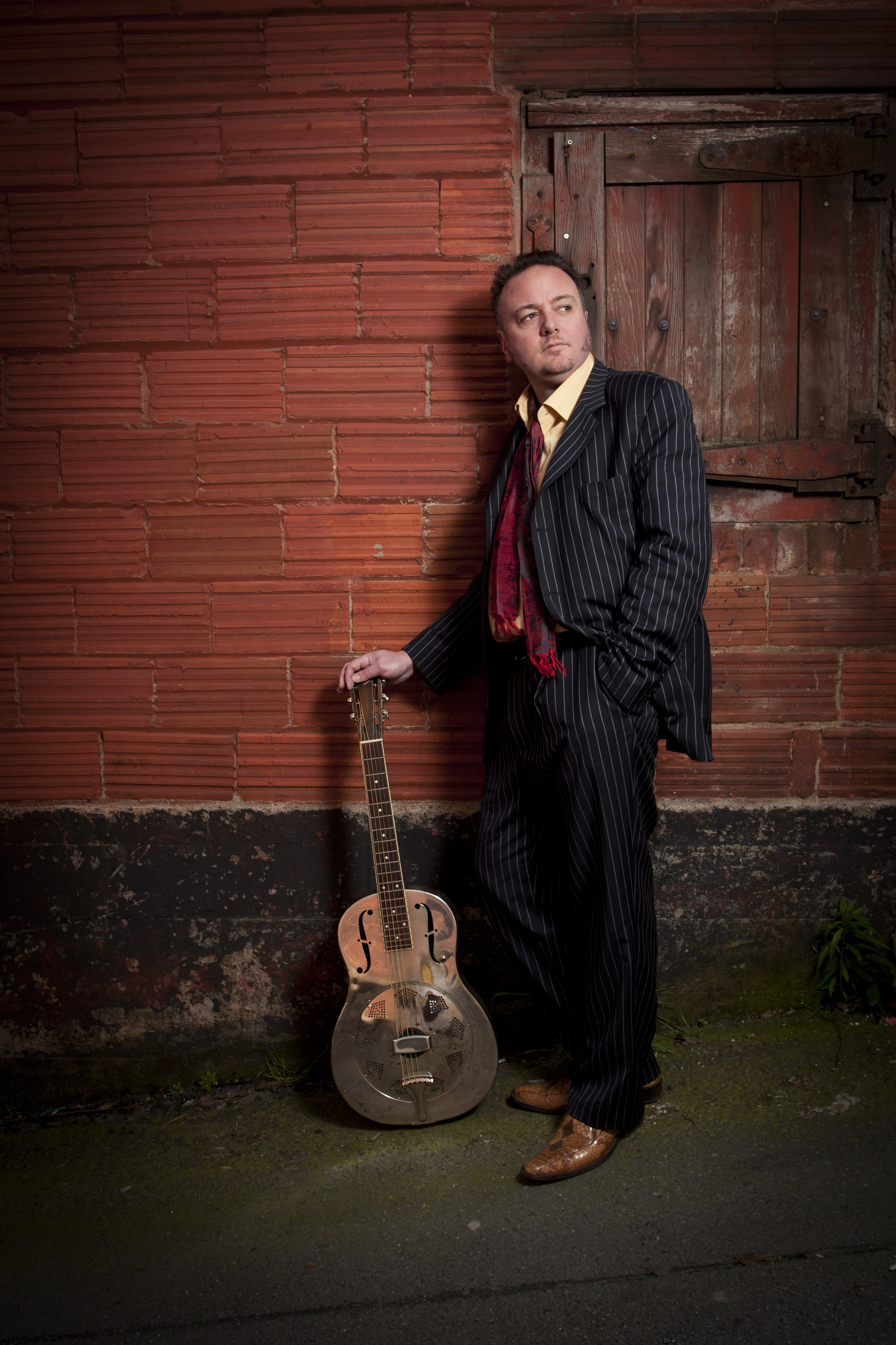
- David Gogo 2011

Background information
- Born: March 18, 1969 (age 57)
- Origin: Nanaimo, British Columbia, Canada
- Genres: Blues; Rock
- Instrument: Guitar
- Labels: Cordova Bay Records, Dixiefrog Records (France)
- Website: www.davidgogo.com

David Gogo (born March 18, 1969), is a Canadian blues guitarist, singer-songwriter and bandleader who is currently signed to the independent Cordova Bay Records label. He was formerly signed to EMI Records. Between 1994 and 2024, he released 16 solo albums. As of 2014, his touring band includes a Hammond organ/piano player, an electric bass player (with a five-string bass) and a drummer.

David Gogo is the cousin of Trooper keyboardist Paul Gogo, Marie Gogo singer and member of Jerry Alfred And The Medicine Beat, and singer/songwriter John Gogo.

== History ==
Gogo was born in Nanaimo, British Columbia, Canada, and received his first guitar at the age of five. At the age of 15, he met Stevie Ray Vaughan backstage at the Royal Theatre in Victoria, British Columbia and was encouraged by the blues legend to pursue a career in blues. By the age of 16, he was getting regular work as a musician. Gogo formed a band called The Persuaders, which eventually opened for blues performers such as Johnny Winter, Buddy Guy and Albert Collins. After a European tour supporting The Fabulous Thunderbirds, Gogo signed a solo record deal with EMI Records. He soon after performed at the Montreux Jazz Festival with the likes of B.B. King, Otis Rush and Blues Traveler. He also guested on Tom Cochrane's Mad Mad World album while working on material for his upcoming debut album. The album David Gogo received a nomination for a Juno Award.

Despite its many successes, Gogo's debut album was never released in the United States, and Gogo made the decision to leave EMI Records in order to pursue his passion for the blues. His next album, Dine Under the Stars, was released in Europe by French label Dixiefrog Records. He also signed with Canadian Independent label Ragged Pup/Cordova Bay Records. Several successful European tours and American blues festival appearances followed, as well as the albums Change of Pace (a rock-oriented blues album) and Bare Bones (an acoustic blues album) in 2000. Gogo was named Musician of the Year at the 1999/2000 West Coast Music Awards.

Halfway to Memphis was released by Cordova Bay Records and Dixiefrog Records (Europe) in 2001. The first single from the album, Skeleton Key, a blues-inspired rendition of the song "Personal Jesus" by Depeche Mode, was released in the summer of 2002. Gogo's version of Personal Jesus earned him an award for Guitarist of the Year at the Maple Blues Awards for 2002.

The special Live At Deer Lake: Official Bootleg Series - Volume 1 is a live recording of songs mostly found on Skeleton Key. The recording was made for broadcast on Vancouver's Rock 101 by blues DJ Norm Casler (Storman Norman) at the 2002 Burnaby Blues Festival in Deer Lake Park. Due to popular demand, the recording was released as an album in 2003. The album was nominated for a 2004 Juno Award in Canada.

Gogo's eighth album, entitled Vibe, is a compilation of original songs written with Tom Wilson, Craig Northey (Odds/Colin James) and John Capek. Vibe was released in 2004 and showcases Gogo's vocal strengths and guitar skills on songs such as "I'll Do Anything" and "300 Pound Shoes". Jeff Healey made a guest appearance with a guitar solo on "She's All Right".

In 2004 Gogo also made a guest appearance on Bob Walsh's album Bob Walsh Live – A Canadian Blues Rendez-Vous. He also received his second Guitarist of the Year award at the Maple Blues Awards in 2004.

In 2006, Gogo released another acoustic blues album as part of his Bootleg Series. Acoustic: Official Bootleg Series - Volume 2 features the rich tones of Gogo's 1930 National Steel guitar as well as his 1915 Gibson and a modern-day 12-string. Acoustic was nominated for a Juno Award for Blues Album of the Year.

In 2008, Gogo's music was featured in the Steven Seagal movie, Kill Switch.

Gogo's tenth album was recorded in his own home in Nanaimo, British Columbia with the sights of the 160-acre Christmas tree farm and forest that make up the Gogo family compound to inspire him. Different Views was produced by Juno-nominated producer Russell Broom (Jann Arden, Sam Roberts, The Dudes) with guests Shaun Verrault (Wide Mouth Mason), roots diva Carolyn Mark, and jazz great Phil Dwyer. Different Views was released in July 2009.

In June 2011, David Gogo released his eleventh album, titled Soul Bender, named after the Fulltone guitar pedal of the same name. Soul Bender is a combination of original songs and covers, including "The Changeling" by The Doors and "The Way You Make Me Feel" by Michael Jackson. The album was nominated for JUNO Award (Blues Album of the Year), a SiriusXM INDIES Award (Blues Recording of the Year), and won "Blues Recording of the Year" at the 2012 Western Canadian Music Awards.

Gogo's next project was a Christmas album, titled Christmas With The Blues. It was released on November 13, 2012 and features seven blues-inspired standards and two originals and is a blend of traditional blues with a few hints of roots, gospel and rock ‘n roll. Sitting in on the recording were Canadian musicians Bill Hicks, David Vest, Phil Dwyer, Shawn Hall, Tina Jones, and Camille Miller. Despite living on a Christmas Tree Farm, Gogo wasn't originally enthused about the idea of making a Christmas album, but while listening to some old Christmas classics from the 1940s, 1950s, and 1960s, he discovered a lot of blues-based songs that are the basis of this album.

In July 2013, David Gogo released his 13th album, Come On Down. The aptly titled album features twelve diverse tunes; six reinvented yet classic covers and six originals inspired by a pilgrimage he did along the "Blues Trail" in Memphis, Mississippi and Alabama. Musicians including Rick May, David Vest, Shawn Hall (Harpoonist & The Axe Murderer), Billy Hicks, and Tina Jones appear on the album. The album was nominated for a Juno award in the category of Blues Album of the Year.

In September 2015, David Gogo released his 14th album, Vicksburg Call. The album features ten songs; six originals and four covers, and was recorded with producer Rick Salt in Nanaimo, British Columbia. Vicksburg Call was recorded with Gogo's backing band, featuring Bill Hicks on drums and Jay Stevens on bass. The album also features guest appearances by Shawn Hall (of Harpoonist & The Axe Murderer), and Kim Simmonds (of Savoy Brown).

== Discography ==
=== Solo ===
- 1994 David Gogo (Capitol/EMI)
- 2000 Dine Under the Stars (Ragged Pup/Cordova Bay Records)
- 2000 Bare Bones (Ragged Pup/Cordova Bay Records)
- 2000 Change of Pace (Cordova Bay Records)
- 2001 Halfway to Memphis (Cordova Bay Records)
- 2002 Skeleton Key (Cordova Bay Records)
- 2003 Live At Deer Lake: Official Bootleg Series Vol. 1 (Cordova Bay Records)
- 2004 Vibe (Cordova Bay Records)
- 2006 Acoustic: Official Bootleg Series Vol. 2 (Cordova Bay Records)
- 2009 Different Views (Cordova Bay Records)
- 2011 Soul-Bender (Cordova Bay Records)
- 2012 Christmas With The Blues (Cordova Bay Records)
- 2013 Come On Down (Cordova Bay Records)
- 2015 Vicksburg Call (Cordova Bay Records)
- 2018 17 Vultures (Cordova Bay Records)
- 2021 Silver Cup (Cordova Bay Records)
- 2024 YEAH! (Cordova Bay Records)

=== Compilation inclusions ===
- 2006 Saturday Night Blues: 20 Years (CBC)

== Awards and accolades ==
=== Juno Awards ===
The Juno Awards are presented by the Canadian Academy of Recording Arts and Sciences.

Year	Nominee / work	Award	Result
1995	David Gogo	Best New Solo Artist	Nominated
2003	David Gogo Live at Deer Lake	Blues Album of the Year	Nominated
2007	David Gogo Acoustic	Blues Album of the Year	Nominated
2012	David Gogo Soul Bender	Blues Album of the Year	Nominated
2014	David Gogo Come On Down	Blues Album of the Year	Nominated

=== Maple Blues Awards ===
The Maple Blues Awards are Canada’s blues awards, "honouring the finest in Canadian blues". They are the only comprehensive national best in blues awards program. The program's goal is to promote blues music across Canada, and to recognize outstanding achievement. The Maple Blues Awards have been presented by the Toronto Blues Society since their inception in 1997.

Year	Nominee / work	Award	Result
2002	David Gogo	Guitarist of the Year	Won
2003	David Gogo	Entertainer of the Year	Nominated
2003	David Gogo	Electric Act of the Year	Nominated
2003	David Gogo	Guitarist of the Year	Nominated
2003	David Gogo	Songwriter of the Year	Nominated
2003	David Gogo Skeleton Key	Recording of the Year	Nominated
2004	David Gogo	Entertainer of the Year	Nominated
2004	David Gogo	Guitarist of the Year	Won
2005	David Gogo	Electric Act of the Year	Nominated
2009	David Gogo	Electric Act of the Year	Nominated
2010	David Gogo	Electric Act of the Year	Nominated
2011	David Gogo	Guitar Player of the Year	Nominated
2011	David Gogo	Electric Act of the Year	Nominated
2012	David Gogo	Guitar Player of the Year	Nominated
2013	David Gogo	Guitar Player of the Year	Nominated
2013	David Gogo	Electric Act of the Year	Nominated
2015	David Gogo	Guitar Player of the Year	Nominated
2015	David Gogo	Electric Act of the Year	Nominated
2015	David Gogo	Entertainer of the Year	Nominated

=== Canadian Indie Awards ===
The INDIE Music Awards happen every March in Toronto as part of Canadian Music Week.

Year	Nominee / work	Award	Result
2008	David Gogo Acoustic	Blues Album of the Year	Nominated
2012	David Gogo	Blues Artist of the Year	Nominated

=== Western Canadian Music Awards ===
The Western Canadian Music Awards is an annual awards ceremony for music in the western portion of Canada, that originated in its current form in 2003. The awards are provided by the Western Canada Music Alliance, which consists of five Member groups from Alberta, Saskatchewan, Manitoba, British Columbia and Yukon.

Year	Nominee / work	Award	Result
2007	David Gogo Acoustic	Outstanding Blues Recording	Nominated
2012	David Gogo Soul Bender	Blues Recording of the Year	Won
2014	David Gogo Come On Down	Blues Recording of the Year	Nominated

=== Great Canadian Blues Award ===
The CBC Radio's Saturday Night Blues established The Great Canadian Blues Awards in 1990. The program presents an annual Great Canadian Blues Award to the year's best Canadian blues musician. At the time it was created, the Great Canadian Blues Award was the only official recognition for Canadian blues artists. This award pre-dates the blues Juno, the Maple Blues Awards, and many other regional awards.

Year	Nominee / work	Award	Result
2004	David Gogo	Best Canadian Blues Musician	Won

=== West Coast Music Awards ===
The West Coast Music Awards were an annual music awards ceremony, presenting awards to musicians from British Columbia and the Yukon. In 2003, the West Coast Music Awards combined with Alberta, Saskatchewan, and Manitoba to form the Western Canadian Music Awards.

Year	Nominee / work	Award	Result
2000	David Gogo	Musician of the Year	Won
