= Mike Edel =

Canadian folk musician

- Born: Michael Richard Edel; December 18, 1985 (age 40); Linden, Alberta
- Origin: Victoria, British Columbia
- Genres: Folk, pop, rock, indie folk, folk pop indie rock, folk rock
- Occupation: Musician
- Instruments: Vocals, guitar, piano, bass, banjo
- Years active: 2008–present
- Labels: Cordova Bay, Pennant, Pop-up Records
- Website: mikeedel.com

Michael Richard Edel (born December 18, 1985) is a Canadian folk musician, guitarist, and songwriter.

He has released four studio albums, The Last of Our Mountains (2011), India, Seattle (2015), Thresholds (2019), and En Masse (2020). Edel has also released two extended plays, Hide from the Seasons (2008) and The Country Were I Came From (2012).

Edel has over six million streams across various platforms. His music has been featured on ABC's American Idol, CBC Radio, and SiriusXM.

== Career ==
=== 2008 - 2011: Career Beginnings, Hide from the Seasons, and The Last of our Mountains ===
Edel's music career began with the release of the 5 song EP Hide from the Seasons in 2008.

The single The Country Where I Came From was voted best single by the Victoria Times Colonist in 2012.

=== 2012 - 2016: India, Seattle ===
His second studio album, India, Seattle (2015), was released by Cordova Bay Records. The album was recorded primarily with Colin Stewart, who also worked with Dan Mangan and The New Pornographers. The album draws from Mike Edel's life experiences to create "folksy rock" music. Many of the songs were inspired by Edel's upbringing in rural Alberta, such as The Closer, which tells the story of watching his brother's baseball game as a young child, and Julia, which mentions Calgary by name. Other songs on the album, such as Blue Above the Green are inspired by his subsequent time living in Victoria.

=== 2017 - 2021: Thresholds and En Masse ===
Thresholds, Edel's third studio album, was released in 2019.

His fourth studio album, En Masse, saw contributions from Andy Park and Marcus Paquin. The album explores genres like "exuberant pop and more melancholic rock", according to Exclaim.

His 2018 single, Finish Line, was produced by Chris Walla, formerly of Death Cab for Cutie. The single was featured on American Idol in 2019.

In April 2021, Edel suffered from a stroke while he was on tour with his wife.

=== 2022 - Present: Casseroles & Flowers ===
Edel's fifth album, Casseroles & Flowers, was released in the summer of 2022 by his record label, Pennant (stylized as PENNANT). The album was written and recorded while Edel was recovering from a stroke he suffered on tour in April 2021. It is the first record he self-produced and mixed. The album recounts experiencing the stroke as well as his dream of living in a converted van and touring North America. Most of the album was written from a hospital bed in between hours of rehab appointments each day.

Casseroles & Flowers is accompanied by a documentary, recounting Edel's experiences over the previous year.

On February 7, 2023, Mike released a cover of Fleetwood Mac's 'Little Lies' on various digital platforms. The single is self-produced, with Mike playing all instruments.

== Personal life ==
Michael Richard Edel was born on December 18, 1985, in Linden, Alberta, where he lived for 18 years, before he relocated to Victoria, British Columbia. He now lives in Bellingham, WA.

== Discography ==
Studio albums

- The Last of Our Mountains (January 2011, Independent)
- India, Seattle (April 14, 2015, Cordova Bay)
- Thresholds (March 1, 2019, Popup-records)
- En Masse (2020)
- Casseroles & Flowers (upcoming, 2022, Pennant Publishing)

EPs

- Hide from the Seasons (June 2008, Independent)
- The Country Where I Came From (September 2012, Independent)
