= Tyson Motsenbocker =

American singer

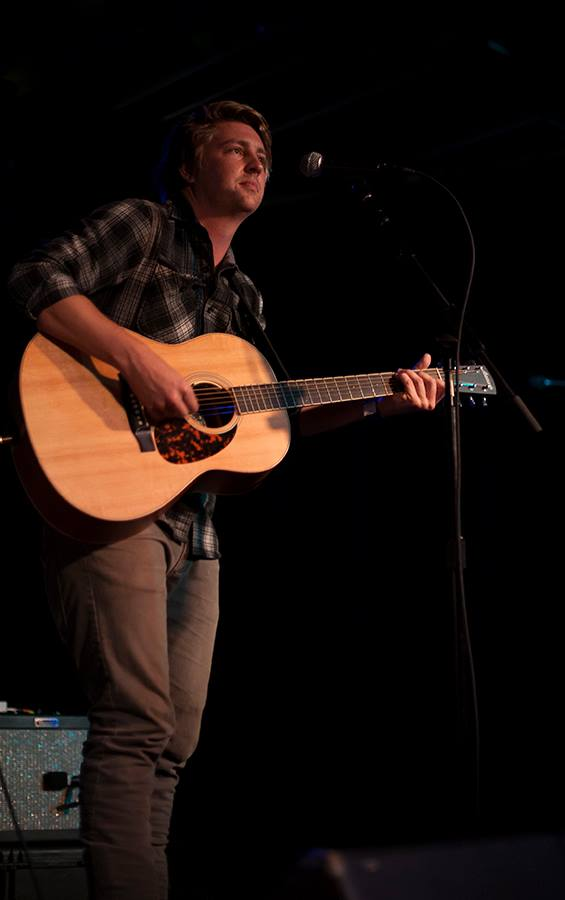
- Tyson Motsenbocker

Background information
- Born: Tyson Jay Motsenbocker; April 26, 1986 (age 40); Wenatchee, Washington
- Origin: San Diego, California
- Genres: Singer-songwriter
- Occupations: Singer, songwriter, guitarist
- Instruments: Vocals, guitar
- Years active: 2010–present
- Label: Tooth & Nail
- Website: tysonmotsenbocker.com

Tyson Jay Motsenbocker (born April 26, 1986) is an American songwriter and guitarist. He has released four studio albums, 2016's Letters to Lost Loves, 2020's Someday I'll Make It All Up to You, 2022's Milk Teeth, and 2025's Modern Worries, all three with Tooth & Nail Records.

== Early years and background ==
Tyson Jay Motsenbocker was born on April 26, 1986, in Wenatchee, Washington, while he was raised in Pullman, Washington, by his parents William "Bill" and Jeanne Motsenbocker. He has a sibling, Jaimie Motsenbocker. Motsenbocker is a graduate of Whitworth University in Spokane, Washington, where he graduated in 2009 with his baccalaureate in English. He now resides in San Diego, California.

== Music history ==
His music recording career began in 2010, with the extended play, Until It Lands. The subsequent extended play, Rivers and Roads, was independently released in 2013. He released, Letters to Lost Loves, on March 4, 2016, with Tooth & Nail Records. Much of the content and songwriting for Letters to Lost Loves was created during a month long walk he took from his home in San Diego to the Golden Gate Bridge in San Francisco. Motsenbocker followed up his debut album with two additional extended play albums in 2017, Almira and A Kind Invitation also with Tooth & Nail Records.

On February 14, 2020, he released his sophomore full-length album, Someday I'll Make It All Up to You.

On July 13, 2022, Tyson released "Carlo Rossi (Love in the Face of Great Danger", the first single from his third album Milk Teeth which was released September 23, 2022.

On May 10, 2024, Motsenbocker released a cover of Mazzy Star’s 1993 hit “Fade Into You,” marking the beginning of a six-song cover project of singles released over the next five months culminating into the EP named Songs I’ve Always Liked And Will Never Admit.

On October 24, 2025, Motsenbocker released Modern Worries.

== Discography ==
Studio albums

- Letters to Lost Loves (March 4, 2016)
- Someday I'll Make It All Up to You (February 14, 2020)
- Milk Teeth (September 23, 2022)
- Modern Worries (October 24, 2025)
