= Life, Love & Lies =

Studio album by State of Shock
- Released: June 19, 2007
- Recorded: 2006–2007
- Genre: Alternative rock, pop rock
- Label: Cordova Bay Records
- Producer: Jeff Dawson

State of Shock chronology
Guilty by Association (2004)	Life, Love & Lies (2007)	Rock N' Roll Romance (2011)

Singles from Life, Love & Lies
- 1. "Money Honey" Released: June 2007; 2. "Hearts That Bleed" Released: October 4, 2007; 3. "Best I Ever Had" Released: June 2008; 4. "Too Pretty" Released: 2009

Life, Love & Lies is the second studio album by Canadian rock band State of Shock. The album includes their single, "Money Honey". Life, Love & Lies was produced by Canadian Producer Jeff Dawson. The photography on the album was done by Erich Saide. The second single was announced on the band's official website on October 4, 2007, as "Hearts That Bleed". In 2008 State of Shock re-released the album in the U.S. This version included both a brand new song titled "When Did Love Leave" and a re-recorded version of "Rollin", a song from their previous album Guilty By Association. In April 2011, the album was certified gold by the CRIA.

== Track listing ==
1. "Life, Love & Lies" - 3:50
2. "Hearts That Bleed" - 3:10
3. "Too Pretty" - 3:34
4. "Best I Ever Had" - 3:45
5. "Day After Day" - 3:39
6. "Money Honey" - 3:17
7. "Honeymoon's Over" - 3:06
8. "Different Day" - 4:05
9. "Stupid" - 2:35
10. "Pieces of You" - 3:48
11. "Rollin" - 3:53 (US)
12. "When Did Love Leave" - 3:28 (US)

== Singles ==
- "Money Honey" (2007)
- "Hearts That Bleed" (2007)
- "Best I Ever Had" (2008)
- "Too Pretty" (2009)
- "Different Day" (2009)
