= State of Shock (band) =

Canadian rock band

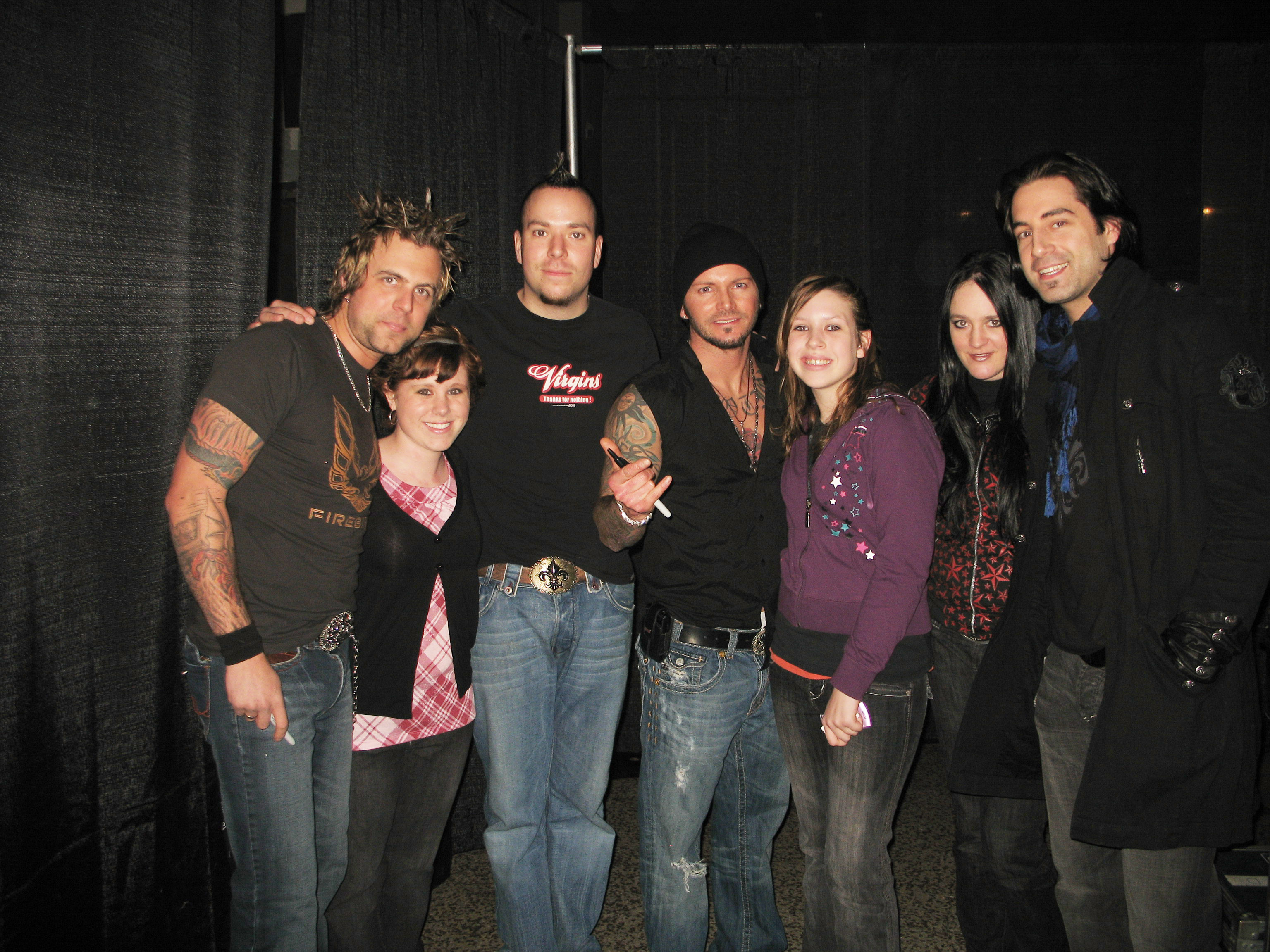
- Left to right:Jesse Wainwright, fan, Simon Clow, John Philippon, fan, Alison Toews, Cameron Melnyk

Background information
- Origin: Vancouver, British Columbia, Canada
- Genres: Alternative rock Pop rock
- Years active: 1999–present
- Labels: Cordova Bay Records (2005–present); IODA (2004–2005)
- Members: Cameron Melnyk; Alison Toews; Jesse Wainwright; Simon Clow; John Philippon

State of Shock is a Canadian band from Vancouver, British Columbia. Formed by Jesse Wainwright and Johnny Philippon, they made their debut in June 2004 with their album Guilty by Association after winning CFOX-FM's Seeds contest, and won Favourite New Group of the Year at the 2005 Canadian Music Awards.

They became better known in early 2007, with the release of their album Life, Love & Lies. Included in the album was their successful debut single, "Money Honey", which won the band a Juno Award nomination for New Group of the Year, two Canadian Radio Music Awards in the category of Best New Group for both rock and CHR formats, as well as a Canadian Indie Music Award for Favourite Single of the Year. The single eventually reached the double platinum sales mark for digital sales in Canada and stayed on Billboard's Canadian Hot 100 chart for nearly a year. With their second single "Hearts that Bleed", the band enjoyed a top-ten slot at MuchMusic and rock radio. During the summer of 2007, State of Shock went on a Canada-wide tour supporting bands such as Nickelback and Puddle of Mudd, and opening for Aerosmith in front of 27,000 people at Sarnia Bayfest.

State of Shock released their third studio album, Rock N' Roll Romance, on 20 September 2011. Both albums were produced by Jeff Dawson and mixed by Mike Fraser.

In 2014, Jesse Wainwright (guitar, backing vocals) teamed up with country singer Stacey McKitrick as a new country duo, Austin Belle, with Kadooh (Simon Clow) playing guitar for Austin Belle's live shows.

== Band members ==
- Cameron Melnyk: lead vocals
- Alison Toews: bass, backing vocals
- Jesse Wainwright: guitar, backing vocals
- Simon Clow (Kadooh): guitar, backing vocals
- Johnny Philippon: drums

== Discography ==
=== Albums ===
Title	Date of Release	Label	CAN	U.S.
Guilty by Association	2004; 2007	IODA Cordova Bay Records	-	-
Life, Love & Lies	19 June 2007; 28 October 2008	Cordova Bay Records; Universal Republic	-	-
Rock N' Roll Romance	20 September 2011	Universal Canada	-	-

=== Singles ===
Year	Song	Chart Positions	Album
Year	Song	CAN	Album
2004	"Wish I Never Met You" ^{1}	—	Guilty by Association
2004	"If I Could" ^{1}	—	Guilty by Association
2005	"So Many Times" ^{1}	—	Guilty by Association
2007	"Money Honey"	8	Life, Love & Lies
2007	"Hearts That Bleed"	40	Life, Love & Lies
2008	"Best I Ever Had"	25	Life, Love & Lies
2008	"Too Pretty"	27	Life, Love & Lies
2009	"Different Day"	—	Life, Love & Lies
2011	"Have a Nice Day"	—	Rock N' Roll Romance
2011	"Runaway"	—	Rock N' Roll Romance
2011	"Wish I Woulda Wowed U"	—	Rock N' Roll Romance

^{1} Weren't produced into physical singles, but music videos were made for them.

== Awards ==
=== Canadian Radio Music Awards ===
- Best Rock song (for "Money Honey") – Winner
- Best Contemporary hit radio song (for "Money Honey") – Winner
- Best Hot Adult Contemporary song (for "Money Honey") –
- Independent Single of the Year (money honey) – Winner – (beat out Feist)
- Western Canadian Rock Recording of the Year 2008 – Winner

=== 2008 Juno Awards ===
- Best New Group of the Year – Nominated

=== Independent Music Awards ===
- Hard Rock/Metal Album of the year (Life, Love, and Lies) – Nominated

== Television appearances ==
In 2008, State of Shock appeared on the show About a Girl, playing their single "Money Honey".
